= Allein Gott in der Höh sei Ehr =

Hymn composed by Nikolaus Decius

- Lutheran hymn
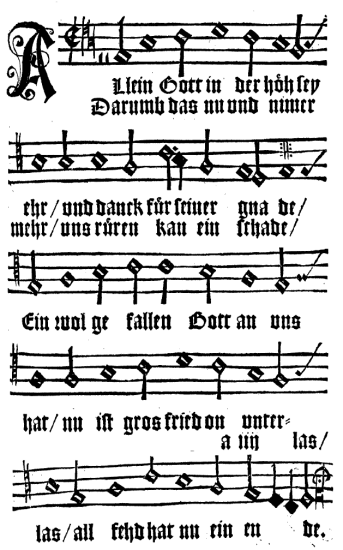
- Print in Johann Spangenberg's Kirchengesenge Deudtsch, Magdeburg 1545
- English: All glory be to God on high
- Catalogue: Zahn 4457
- Text: by Nikolaus Decius
- Language: German
- Based on: Gloria
- Melody: by Decius
- Published: 1531
- EG 179, GL 170

"Allein Gott in der Höh sei Ehr" (Alone to God in the highest be glory) is an early Lutheran hymn, with text and melody attributed to Nikolaus Decius. With the reformers intending church service in German, it was intended as a German version of the Gloria part of the Latin mass, used in almost every service. Decius wrote three stanzas, probably in 1523, while a fourth was added, probably by Joachim Slüter.

"Allein Gott in der Höh sei Ehr" is included in many German hymnals, including the current Protestant hymnal Evangelisches Gesangbuch and (in three stanzas) in the Catholic hymnal Gotteslob. Catherine Winkworth translated it to "All glory be to God on high".

== History ==
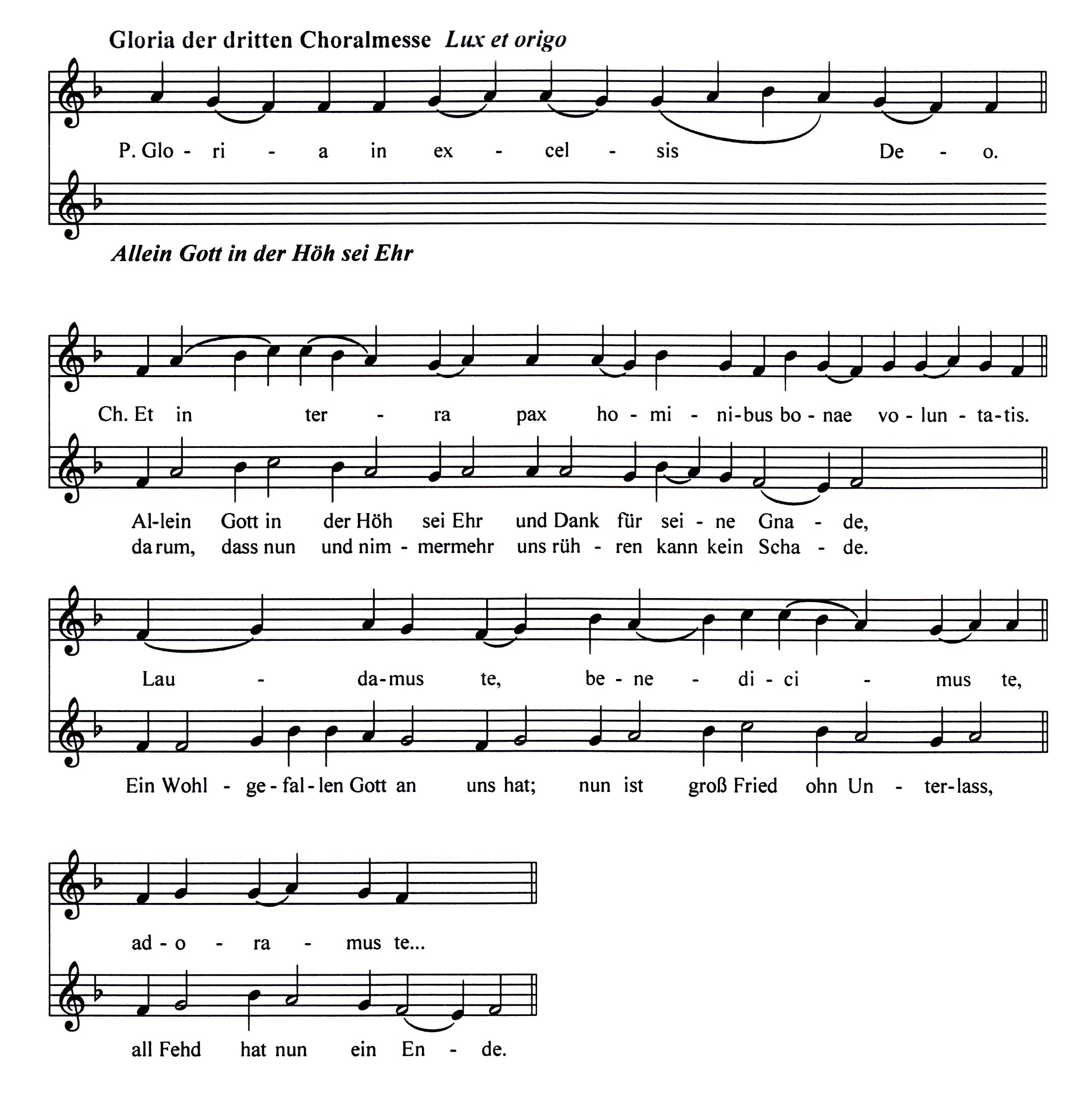
From the Easter mass

With the Reformation, the traditional Latin of Christian church services was changed to German. "Allein Gott in der Höh sei Ehr" is a paraphrase of the Latin Gloria from the mass liturgy. The oldest prints of the hymn do not mention an author, but it is believed that it was written in Low German by Nikolaus Decius in 1523, which makes it one of the earliest songs of the Reformation. The melody, Zahn No. 4457, is adapted from the Gloria of the mass for Easter in Gregorian chant, Lux et origo (GL 114).

=== Early publications ===
"Aleyne God yn der Höge sy eere" is the first Low German version of the later "Allein Gott in der Höh sei Ehr" published in Joachim Slüter's Geystlyke leder (Rostock, 1531). The first print in High German appeared in a hymnal by Valentin Schumann in Leipzig in 1539. The text and melody of the hymn were published together for the first time in Johann Spangenberg's Kirchengesenge Deudtsch (Magdeburg 1545).

=== Authorship ===
In 17th-century Leipzig hymnals the German text of "Allein Gott in der Höh sei Ehr" was attributed to Nikolaus Selnecker. In his church history of Braunschweig, published in five volumes between 1707 and 1720, Philipp Julius Rehtmeyer refers to a Latin document from 1600, which named Decius as the author of text and melody of both "Allein Gott in der Höh sei Ehr" and "O Lamm Gottes, unschuldig". The creation of hymns by Decius is dated 1522/23, before the first publications of hymns by Martin Luther (1524): thus these hymns belong to the earliest of the Reformation.

== Text and translation ==
"Allein Gott in der Höh sei Ehr" is in four stanzas of seven lines each. The following text is taken from the Protestant hymnal Evangelisches Gesangbuch which has the hymn as EG 179. The Catholic hymnal Gotteslob has only the first three stanzas, as GL 170, and a slight change in the rhythm. Both hymnals note 1523 as the year of writing. Catherine Winkworth translated the hymn to "All glory be to God on high, who hath our race befriended", which appears in 95 hymnals.

Decius

Allein Gott in der Höh sei Ehr
und Dank für seine Gnade,
darum dass nun und nimmermehr
uns rühren kann kein Schade.
Ein Wohlgefalln Gott an uns hat;
nun ist groß Fried ohn Unterlass,
all Fehd hat nun ein Ende.

Wir loben, preisn, anbeten dich;
für deine Ehr wir danken,
dass du, Gott Vater, ewiglich
regierst ohn alles Wanken.
Ganz ungemessn ist deine Macht,
allzeit geschieht, was du bedacht.
Wohl uns solch eines Herren!

O Jesu Christ, Sohn eingeborn
des allerhöchsten Vaters,
Versöhner derer, die verlorn,
du Stiller unsres Haders,
Lamm Gottes, heilger Herr und Gott:
nimm an die Bitt aus unsrer Not,
erbarm dich unser. Amen.

O Heilger Geist, du höchstes Gut,
du allerheilsamst' Tröster:
vor Teufels G'walt fortan behüt,
die Jesus Christ erlöset
durch große Mart'r und bittern Tod;
abwend all unsern Jamm'r und Not!
Darauf wir uns verlassen.

Winkworth

All glory be to God on high,
Who hath our race befriended!
To us no harm shall now come nigh,
The strife at last is ended.
God showeth His good will to men,
And peace shall reign on earth again;
O thank Him for His goodness!

We praise, we worship Thee, we trust,
And give Thee thanks forever,
O Father, that Thy rule is just
And wise, and changes never.
Thy boundless pow'r o'er all things reigns,
Done is whate'er Thy will ordains:
Well for us that Thou rulest.

O Jesus Christ, Thou only Son
Of God, Thy heav'nly Father,
Who didst for all our sins atone
And Thy lost sheep dost gather.
Thou Lamb of God, to Thee on high
From out our depths we sinners cry,
Have mercy on us, Jesus!

O Holy Ghost, Thou precious Gift,
Thou Comforter unfailing,
O'er Satan's snares our souls uplift
And let thy pow'r availing
Avert our woes and calm our dread.
For us the Saviour's blood was shed;
We trust in Thee to save us.

== Hymn tune and musical settings ==
=== Organ settings ===
As a hymn usually sung every Sunday, "Allein Gott in der Höh sei Ehr" was often the basis for chorale preludes. Among those by Johann Sebastian Bach there are three in Clavier-Übung III (BWV 675, BWV 676 and BWV 677), and three others in the Great Eighteen Chorale Preludes (BWV 662, BWV 663 and BWV 664), and BWV 711 in Kirnberger Chorale Preludes. Other composers from the 18th century or earlier set the hymn tune for organ including Wilhelm Friedemann Bach, Georg Böhm, Christian Geist, Johann Peter Kellner and Melchior Schildt.

Max Reger composed two chorale preludes, the first of his 52 chorale preludes, Op. 67 in 1902, and No. 2 of his 30 small chorale preludes, Op. 135a, in 1914. Charles Tomlinson Griffes wrote an organ piece in 1910. Sigfrid Karg-Elert included a setting as No. 23 of his 66 Chorale improvisations for organ, published in 1909. Ernst Pepping used it for the Gloria of his Deutsche Choralmesse, a six-part setting of 1928. Contemporary organ settings were written by Aivars Kalējs, among others.

=== Vocal settings ===
Bach set the hymn as a four-part chorale, (BWV 260).

He used the melody in four of his extant cantatas. He included the hymn in Auf Christi Himmelfahrt allein, BWV 128 for the Feast of the Ascension. He used the first stanza of the hymn "Der Herr ist mein getreuer Hirt", a paraphrase of Psalm 23 by Cornelius Becker published in 1602, as the third movement of Ich bin ein guter Hirt, BWV 85 and the closing chorale of Du Hirte Israel, höre, BWV 104, with the tune of "Allein Gott in der Höh sei Ehr". Similarly, he used a 1530 paraphrase of Psalm 23 by Wolfgang Meuslin as the base of the chorale cantata Der Herr ist mein getreuer Hirt, BWV 112.

Felix Mendelssohn included a setting of the hymn in his oratorio Paulus, as No. 3, the first chorale, following the overture and a chorus.
