= 66 Chorale improvisations for organ =

The 66 Chorale improvisations for organ, Op. 65, were composed by Sigfrid Karg-Elert between 1906 and 1908, and first published in six volumes in 1909. The composition was dedicated to "the great organist Alexandre Guilmant".

== Volumes ==
=== Volume 1. Advent, Christmas ===
1. Oh remain with your grace – Christ that is my life ("Ach bleib mit deiner Gnade" – "Christus der ist mein Leben")
2. From the depth of my heart ("Aus meines Herzens Grunde")
3. All depends on our possessing ("Alles ist an Gottes Segen")
4. It is our salvation come here to us ("Es ist das Heil uns kommen her")
5. Be joyful, my soul ("Freu dich sehr, o meine Seele")
6. Praise be to You, Jesus Christ ("Gelobet seist du, Jesu Christ")
7. Praise God the Lord, Ye Sons of Men ("Lobt Gott, ihr Christen allzugleich")
8. Open Wide the Gates ("Macht hoch die Tür")
9. With strength, o people – From God shall naught divide me ("Mit Ernst, o Menschenkinder" – Von Gott will ich nicht lassen")
10. From heaven above ("Vom Himmel hoch" – "Dies ist der Tag, den Gott gemacht")
11. How shall I receive Thee ("Valet will ich dir geben" – "Wie soll ich dich empfangen")

=== Volume 2. Passiontide ===
12. On the waters of Babylon ("An Wasserflüssen Babylon" – "Ein Lämmlein geht und trägt die Schuld")
13. Lord Jesus Christ, turn to us ("Herr Jesu Christ, dich zu uns wend)"
14. Lord and Elder of the Christians ("Herr und Ältster deiner Kreuzgemeinde")
15. Lord, Thee I love with all my heart ("Herzlich lieb hab ich dich, o Herr")
16. My longing is unbounded (O sacred head now wounded) ("Herzlich tut mich verlangen" – "O Haupt voll Blut und Wunden")
17. Alas, dear Lord, what law then hast Thou broken ("Herzliebster Jesu, was hast du verbrochen")
18. I want to love you, my strength ("Ich will dich lieben, meine Stärke")
19. I thank Thee already through Thy Son ("Ich dank dir schon durch deinen Sohn")
20. Oh Lamb of God, innocent ("O Lamm Gottes, unschuldig")
21. Oh world, I must leave you ("O Welt, ich muss dich lassen")
22. Should I not sing to my God – Let us with Jesus go ("Sollt ich meinem Gott nicht singen" – "Lasset uns mit Jesu ziehen")

=== Volume 3. New Year's Day, Easter and other festive days ===
23. All Glory be to God on high ("Allein Gott in der Höh sei Ehr – Gloria in excelsis Deo")
24. To You, to You, God, will I sing ("Dir, dir, Jehova, will ich singen")
25. On earth has dawned this day of days ("Erschienen ist der herrlich Tag")
26. Jesus, help to triumph, you Prince of life ("Jesu, hilf siegen, du Fürste des Lebens")
27. Jesus, my confidence ("Jesu, meine Zuversicht")
28. Praise the lord oh my soul ("Lobe den Herren, o meine Seele")
29. Deal with me, God, according to your kindness ("Machs mit mir, Gott, nach deiner Güt")
30. After an examination of short days ("Nach einer Prüfung kurzer Tage")
31. Now let us to God, the Lord ("Nun lasst uns Gott dem Herren")
32. Strive right, when God calls ("Ringe recht, wenn Gottes Gnade")
33. Wake up, calls the voice ("Wachet auf, ruft uns die Stimme")

=== Volume 4. Ascension Day, Whitsuntide ===
34. Ah, God and Lord – Draw us to Thee ("Ach Gott und Herr" – "Zeuch uns nach dir")
35. God of the heavens and the earth ("Gott des Himmels und der Erden" – Komm, o komm du Geist des Lebens")
36. Lord what you will (On Christ's Ascension) ("Herr, wie du willst", Christi Himmelfahrt)
37. I thank Thee, dear Lord ("Ich danke dir, lieber Herre" – "O komm, du Geist der Wahrheit")
38. Jesus, my joy ("Jesu, meine Freude")
39. Come Holy Ghost, Lord God ("Komm, Heiliger Geist, Herre Gott")
40. Oh that I had a thousand tongues ("O, dass ich tausend Zungen hätte" – "Wer weiß, wie nahe mir mein Ende")
41. Oh Deliverer from Bondage ("O Durchbrecher aller Bande")
42. Oh eternity, thou thunderous word ("O Ewigkeit, du Donnerwort")
43. Oh God, you righteous God ("O Gott, du frommer Gott", 1st version)"
44. How bright shines the morning star ("Wie schön leuchtet der Morgenstern - O heiliger Geist, kehr bei uns ein)"

=== Volume 5. Reformation, Day of Penance, Communion ===
45. Out of the depths I cry to thee ("Aus tiefer Not schrei ich zu dir")
46. Christ, O lamb of God ("Christe, du Lamm Gottes")
47. A mighty fortress is our God ("Ein feste Burg ist unser Gott")
48. Jerusalem, you grand city ("Jerusalem, du hochgebaute Stadt" )
49. My Jesus I will not leave ("Meinen Jesum lass ich nicht")
50. O Gott, du frommer Gott (2nd version)
51. Adorn yourself, o dear soul ("Schmücke dich, o liebe Seele")
52. Should it sometimes seem alike - "Sollt es gleich bisweilen scheinen"
53. "Straf mich nicht in deinem Zorn" – "Tretet her zum Tisch des Herrn"
54. "Werde munter, mein Gemüte" – "Herr, du hast für alle Sünder"
55. "Wer weiß, wie nahe mir mein Ende"

=== Volume 6. Confirmation, Wedding, Baptism, harvest celebration ===
56. Jesus, lead on – Soul's Bridegroom, Jesus, God's Lamb ("Jesu, geh voran" – Seelenbräutigam, Jesu, Gottes Lamm")
57. Dear Jesus, we are here ("Liebster Jesu, wir sind hier")
58. Praise the Lord, the mighty King" ("Lobe den Herren, den mächtigen König")
59. Now thank we all our God ("Nun danket alle Gott")
60. Oh thou my life's Love – By thee, Jesus, will I remain ("O du Liebe meiner Liebe" – "Bei dir, Jesu, will ich bleiben)"
61. What God does, is done well "Was Gott tut, das ist wohlgetan" (What God does, is done well)
62. Whoever lets only the dear God reign (major) "Wer nur den lieben Gott lässt walten"
63. Whoever lets only the dear God reign (minor) "Wer nur den lieben Gott lässt walten"
64. How bright shines the morning star "Wie schön leuchtet der Morgenstern"
65. How will it be to me, Oh Friend of the soul "Wie wohl ist mir, o Freund der Seelen"
66. Wonderful King, "Wunderbarer König" (Festive chorale for organ, trumpets, trombones and timpani)
