= O Lamm Gottes, unschuldig =

Lutheran hymn

- Lutheran Passion hymn
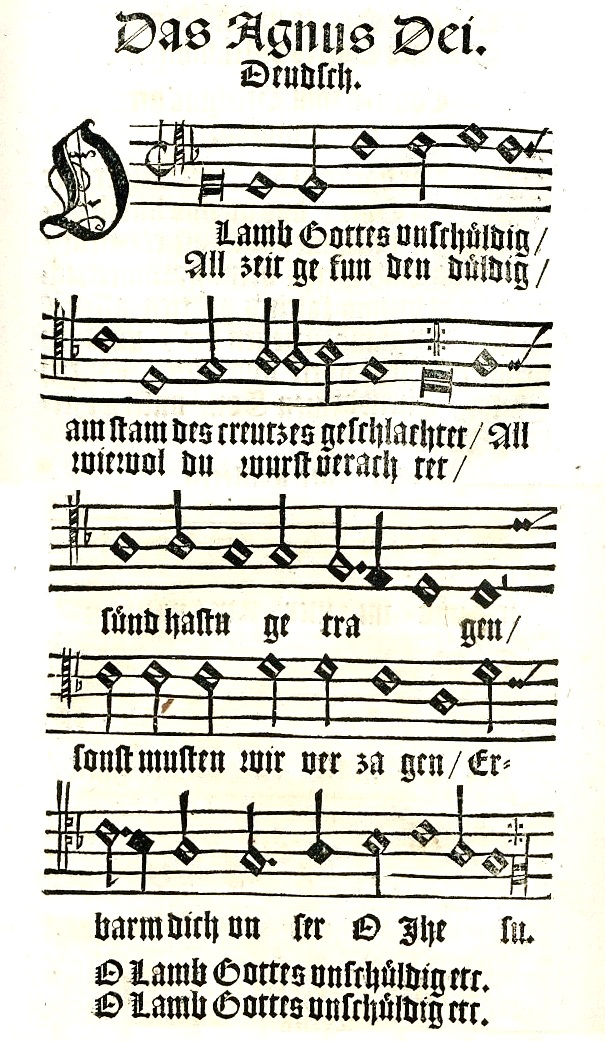
- The hymn in Johann Spangenberg's Kirchengesenge Deudtsch, published in Magdeburg in 1545
- English: O Lamb of God, innocent
- Catalogue: Zahn Nos. 4360–4361
- Text: by Nikolaus Decius
- Language: German
- Based on: "Agnus Dei"
- Melody: by Decius on an older model
- Published: 1531

"O Lamm Gottes, unschuldig" ("O Lamb of God, innocent") is an early Lutheran hymn, with text and melody attributed to Nikolaus Decius. Originally intended as a German version of the Latin Agnus Dei, it was instead used as a Passion hymn. In both contexts, the hymn has often been set to music, prominently as the cantus firmus in the opening chorus of Bach's St. Matthew Passion. It is included in most German hymnals, and has been translated by Catherine Winkworth, among others.

== History ==
Until the 18th century, "O Lamm Gottes, unschuldig" was printed in hymnals without mentioning an author. In his Braunschweigische Kirchen-Historie, Philipp Julius Rehtmeyer presented a Latin report from 1600 that identified Decius the author of the hymn's text and melody and of "Allein Gott in der Höh sei Ehr". A medieval melody may have been the model for the tune. Decius's work is dated 1522/23, in the early Reformation, before Martin Luther's first hymns, published in 1524 in the first Lutheran hymnal.

The song was first printed in Low German in Joachim Slüter's Geystlyke leder in Rostock in 1531. The first print in High German appeared in a hymnal in Leipzig in 1539. It was distributed in German-speaking regions. The melody appeared with the text first in Johann Spangenberg's hymnal Kirchengesenge Deudtsch, published in Magdeburg in 1545, but had appeared in a slightly different version a few years earlier in a Strasbourg hymnal.

== Text ==
As in the Latin model, the Lamb of God is called three times, twice asking for mercy, the third time for peace. The text is given as in the current German hymnals, with Catherine Winkworth's translation, published in 1863 as No. 46 in her Chorale Book for England.

1–3 O Lamm Gottes, unschuldig
am Stamm des Kreuzes geschlachtet, (Note: The comma differs in the current German hymnals: EG has it before "unschuldig" (innocently slaughtered), GL has it afterwards (innocent lamb).)
allzeit erfunden geduldig,
wiewohl du warest verachtet,
all Sünd hast du getragen,
sonst müssten wir verzagen.
1–2 Erbarm dich unser, o Jesu.
3 Gib deinen Frieden, o Jesu.

Translation:

O Lamb of God, most stainless!
Who on the Cross didst languish,
Patient through all Thy sorrows.
Though mocked amid Thine anguish;
Our sins Thou bearest for us,
Else had despair reigned o'er us:
Have mercy upon us, O Jesu!
Grant us Thy peace today, O Jesu!

== Hymnals ==
In all early prints, "O Lamm Gottes, unschuldig" is titled Das Agnus Dei Deutsch (The Agnus Dei in German), indicating that it was supposed to take the position of the Agnus Dei during Abendmahl (communion). This function was soon taken by Luther's "Christe, du Lamm Gottes", while "O Lamm Gottes, unschuldig", which adds the memory of Christ's Passion, was used as a hymn for Passiontide.

The hymn was included in the Evangelisches Kirchengesangbuch (EKG) of 1950 as a Passion song, EKG 55, with two slightly different melodies, called the northern (norddeutsche) and southern (süddeutsche) versions.

The hymn appeared in 1616 first in a Catholic hymnal, in Paderborn, then in the Groß Catholisch Gesangbuch by David Gregor Corner. It was included in 1938 as "O du Lamm Gottes unschuldig" in the collection Kirchenlied as the only Agnus Dei song.

An ecumenical group, Arbeitsgemeinschaft für ökumenisches Liedgut, worked in 1973 on a common version, which appeared in the Catholic Gotteslob in 1975 and in the Protestant Evangelisches Gesangbuch (EG 190.1). In the current Gotteslob the song is GL 203. In all these hymnals, the song was grouped as an Agnus Dei song.

== Melody and musical settings ==
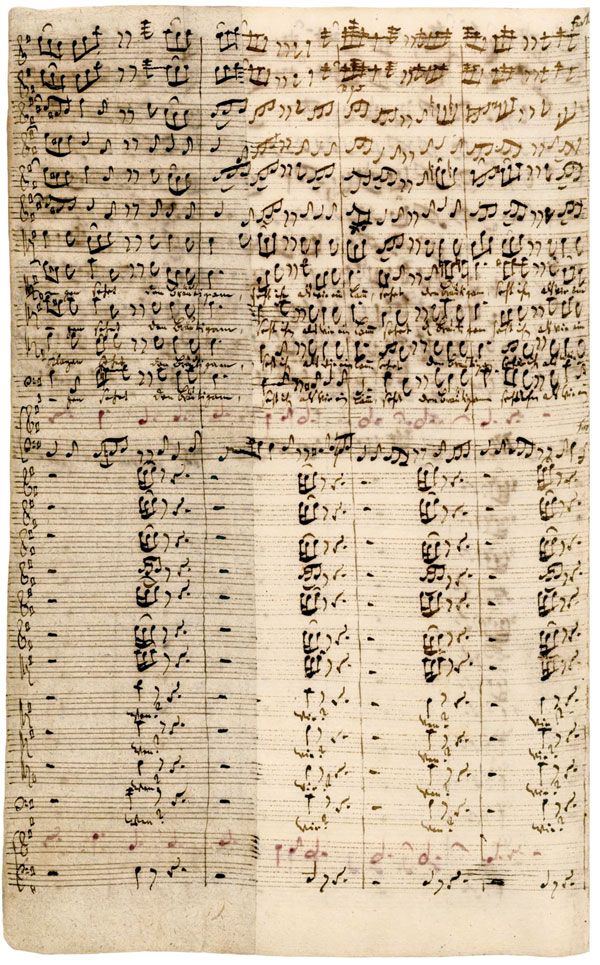
Autograph from Bach's St Matthew Passion, where the hymn was chosen as the cantus firmus, written in the middle in red, above the bass line of chorus I, and also at the bottom above the bass line of chorus II

An older form of the hymn tune "O Lamm Gottes, unschuldig", Zahn No. 4360, was published in 1542, in two variants. It was mainly adopted in the southern part of Germany. A newer form of the hymn tune, Zahn No. 4361a, appeared in 1545. A simplified variant (Zahn No. 4361b) and a variant in triple metre (Zahn No. 4361c) of that newer form were published in the late 16th century.

Johann Sebastian Bach mostly used the Zahn 4361a variant, for instance as a cantus firmus in the opening movement, Kommt, ihr Töchter, helft mir klagen, of his St. Matthew Passion. He wrote it, without words, in red ink in the middle between the first choir on top of the page and the second at the bottom. Bach also composed organ chorale preludes on the hymn. Philipp Spitta called the tripartite chorale BWV 656, one of the Great Eighteen Chorale Preludes, a "marvel of profoundly religious art"; another, BWV 618, forms part of the Orgelbüchlein; and BWV 1095 is found in the Neumeister Collection. Bach also wrote a four-part chorale setting, BWV 401.

Max Reger composed a chorale prelude as No. 32 of his 52 Chorale Preludes, Op. 67 in 1902. Sigfrid Karg-Elert included a setting as No. 20 of his 66 Chorale improvisations for organ, published in 1909.
