= Der Herr ist mein getreuer Hirt, BWV 112 =

Chorale cantata by Johann Sebastian Bach

Der Herr ist mein getreuer Hirt
- BWV 112
- Chorale cantata by J. S. Bach
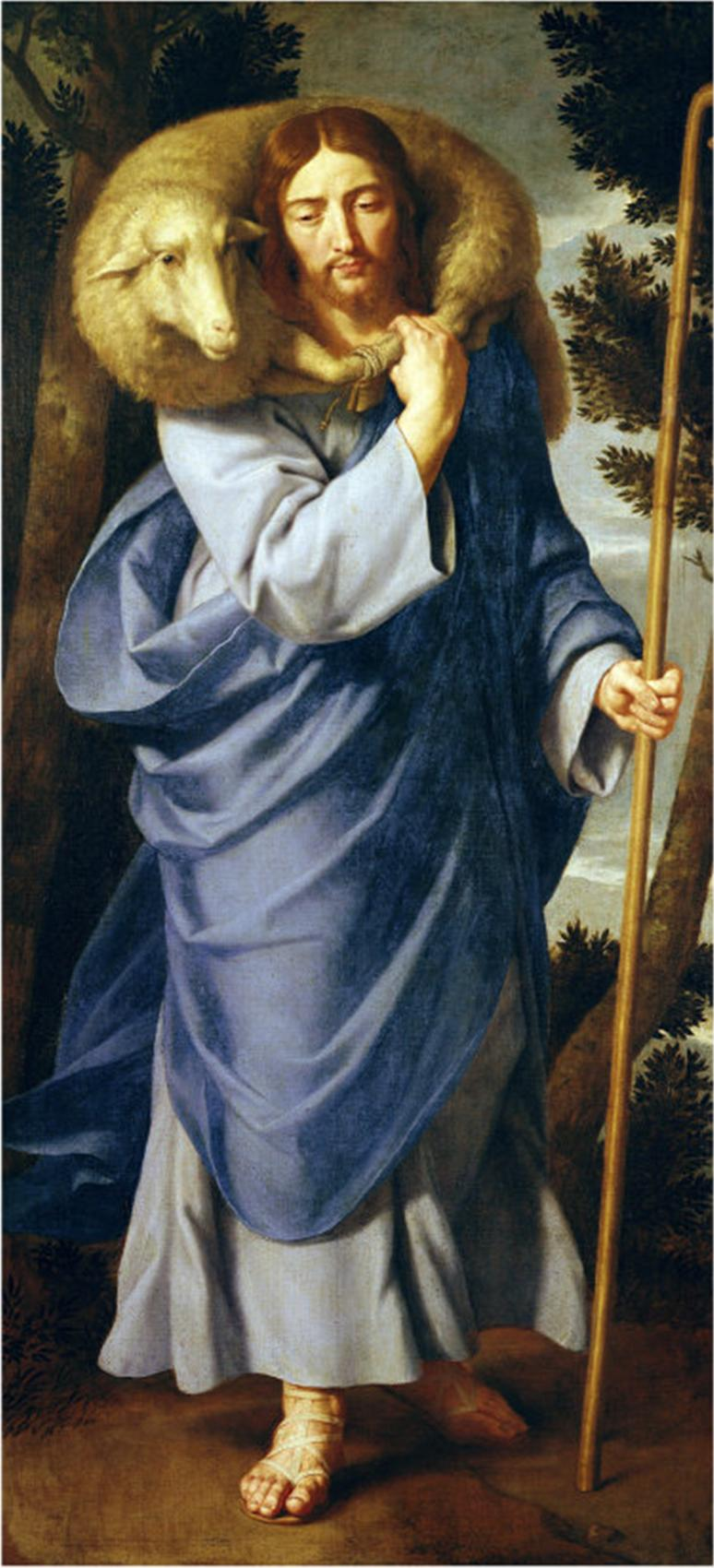
- The Good Shepherd by Jean-Baptiste de Champaigne
- Occasion: Second Sunday after Easter
- Chorale: "Der Herr ist mein getreuer Hirt" by Wolfgang Meuslin
- Performed: 8 April 1731: Leipzig
- Movements: 5
- Vocal: SATB choir and solo
- Instrumental: 2 horns; two oboes d'amore; 2 violins; viola; continuo

Der Herr ist mein getreuer Hirt (The Lord is my faithful Shepherd), BWV 112, is a cantata by Johann Sebastian Bach, a church cantata for the second Sunday after Easter. Bach composed the chorale cantata in Leipzig and first performed it on 8 April 1731. It is based on the hymn by Wolfgang Meuslin, a paraphrase of Psalm 23 written in 1530, sung to a melody by Nikolaus Decius.

Bach, the Thomaskantor in Leipzig from May 1723, composed this cantata to complete his second cantata cycle of chorale cantatas, begun in 1724. He used the lyrics of the hymn unchanged, which reflect the psalm and Jesus as the Good Shepherd. Bach structured the work in five movements. The outer choral movements are a chorale fantasia and a four-part closing chorale, both on the hymn tune. Bach set the inner stanzas as aria – recitative – aria, with music unrelated to the hymn tune. He scored the cantata for four vocal soloists, a four-part choir and a Baroque instrumental ensemble of two horns, two oboes d'amore, strings and continuo. Bach scholars agree that the brass instruments, normally reserved for Feast days, could come from an earlier chorale fantasia of the same melody with the text of the German Gloria.

== History and words ==
In his second year as Thomaskantor in Leipzig, Bach composed chorale cantatas between the first Sunday after Trinity of 1724 and Palm Sunday of 1725, but for Easter he returned to cantatas on more varied texts. He had not composed a chorale cantata yet for the occasion Misericordias Domini, the second Sunday after Easter. The prescribed readings for that Sunday were from the First Epistle of Peter (Christ as a model – 1 Peter 2:21–25), and from the Gospel of John, (the Good Shepherd – John 10:11–16).

During the cycle of 1724/25, the text of the inner stanzas of a hymn was paraphrased by a contemporary poet with whom Bach collaborated. In this cantata however, Bach used the hymn text unchanged, a 1530 hymn in five stanzas written by Wolfgang Meuslin as a paraphrase of Psalm 23. The hymn is sung to the melody of "Allein Gott in der Höh sei Ehr", the German Gloria, by Nikolaus Decius (1522). Meusin's hymn is different from the one with the same opening line by Cornelius Becker, but sung to the same melody, which Bach had used in his other two cantatas for the same occasion, Du Hirte Israel, höre, BWV 104 and Ich bin ein guter Hirt, BWV 85. The hymn's topic, the Lord as the Good Shepherd, has traditionally been used for Jesus and is thus related to the gospel.

Bach first performed the cantata at the Nikolaikirche on 8 April 1731.

== Music ==
=== Structure and scoring ===
Bach structured the cantata in five movements. The text and tune of the hymn are kept in the outer choral movements, a chorale fantasia and a four-part closing chorale, which frame an alternating arias and a recitative. Bach scored the work for four vocal soloists (soprano, alto, tenor, bass), a four-part choir and a Baroque instrumental ensemble of two horns (Co), two oboes d'amore (Oa), two violins (Vl), viola (Va) and basso continuo.

In the following table of the movements, the scoring follows the Neue Bach-Ausgabe. The keys and time signatures are taken from Alfred Dürr, using the symbol for common time (4/4). The continuo, playing throughout, is not shown.

Movements of Der Herr ist mein getreuer Hirt
No.	Title	Text	Type	Vocal	Winds	Strings	Key	Time
1	Der Herr ist mein getreuer Hirt	Meuslin	Chorale fantasia	SATB	2Co 2Oa	2Vl Va	G major	common time
2	Zum reinen Wasser er mich weist	Meuslin	Aria	A	Oa			6/8
3	Und ob ich wandelt im finstern Tal	Meuslin	Recitative	B		2Vl Va		common time
4	Du bereitest für mir einen Tisch	Meuslin	Aria (Duetto)	S T		2Vl Va	D major	common time
5	Gutes und die Barmherzigkeit	Meuslin	Chorale	SATB	2Co 2Oa	2Vl Va	G major	common time

=== Movements ===
In the opening chorus, a chorale fantasia, the melody of the German Gloria "Allein Gott in der Höh sei Ehr" is embedded in an orchestral concerto. The movement opens with calls derived from the chorale tune played on the two horns, leading to a free concerto with the strings and oboes. The cantus firmus is sung by the soprano in long notes, while the lower voices engage in imitation. John Eliot Gardiner compares the movement to the openings of the two former cantatas for the same occasion: "The presence of two horns ... reveals a much more regal portrait of the Good Shepherd than we have previously met." Both Alfred Dürr and Klaus Hofmann assume that the music was not originally composed for this pastoral text, but previously, for the Gloria. Bach had composed a different chorale fantasia on the same melody in Auf Christi Himmelfahrt allein, BWV 128, with similar instrumentation.

The inner three movements quote the text of the hymn without change, but their music is not related to the hymn tune. The alto aria is accompanied by an obbligato oboe. It is structured in two similar parts, and is in pastoral 6/8. The steady flow of the oboe can be seen as depicting the "pure water" mentioned in the text, the steps in the continuo as "the steps made on this significant journey" "on the pathway of the righteousness of His commandments".

The central movement begins as an arioso, accompanied by the continuo, illustrating the walk through the "valley of darkness". The second part is a dramatic recitative with strings, first expressing "Verfolgung, Leiden, Trübsal" (persecution, sorrow, trouble) in a broken melodic line against sustained string chords, then "Thy rod and Thy staff comfort me", where the "first violins weave a comforting little melody".

The following duet expresses enjoyment at God's table in a dance, a bourrée.

The cantata closes with a four-part chorale, most instruments playing colla parte, while the horns play different parts because of their limited range.

== Recordings ==
The selection is taken from the listing on the Bach Cantatas Website. Ensembles playing period instruments in historically informed performances are marked green.

Recordings of Der Herr ist mein getreuer Hirt
Title	Conductor / Choir / Orchestra	Soloists	Label	Year	Instr.
J. S. Bach: Cantatas BWV 112 & BWV 185	Hans Grischkat Schwäbischer Singkreis Stuttgart Bach-Orchester Stuttgart	Claire Fassbender-Luz; Hetty Plümacher; Klaus Stemann; Hermann Werdermann	Teldec	1951	
J. S. Bach: Cantata BWV 112	Günther Ramin Thomanerchor Gewandhausorchester	Elisabeth Meinel-Asbahr; Lotte Wolf-Matthäus; Gert Lutze; Johannes Oettel	Fidelio	1954	
East German Revolution	Hans-Joachim Rotzsch Thomanerchor Gewandhausorchester	Regina Werner; Gerda Schriever; Peter Menzel; Hermann Christian Polster	PILZ	1970s	
J. S. Bach: Das Kantatenwerk • Complete Cantatas • Les Cantates, Folge / Vol. 28	Nikolaus Harnoncourt Tölzer Knabenchor Concentus Musicus Wien	soloist of the Tölzer Knabenchor; Paul Esswood; Kurt Equiluz; Ruud van der Meer	Teldec	1979	Period
Die Bach Kantate Vol. 9	Helmuth Rilling Gächinger Kantorei Bach-Collegium Stuttgart	Inga Nielsen; Gabriele Schreckenbach; Aldo Baldin; Walter Heldwein	Hänssler	1981	
Bach Edition Vol. 21 – Cantatas Vol. 12	Pieter Jan Leusink Holland Boys Choir Netherlands Bach Collegium	Ruth Holton; Sytse Buwalda; Nico van der Meel; Bas Ramselaar	Brilliant Classics	2000	Period
Bach Cantatas Vol. 23: Arnstadt/Echternach / For the 1st Sunday after Easter (Quasimodogeniti) / For the 2nd Sunday after Easter (Misericordas Domini)	John Eliot Gardiner Monteverdi Choir English Baroque Soloists	Katharine Fuge; William Towers; Norbert Meyn; Stephen Varcoe	Soli Deo Gloria	2000	Period
J. S. Bach: Complete Cantatas Vol. 20	Ton Koopman Amsterdam Baroque Orchestra & Choir	Sandrine Piau; Bogna Bartosz; Christoph Prégardien; Klaus Mertens	Antoine Marchand	2003	Period
J. S. Bach: Cantatas Vol. 52 – Wachet auf, ruft uns die Stimme, Cantatas · 29 · 112 · 140 (Cantatas from Leipzig 1730s–40s (I))	Masaaki Suzuki Bach Collegium Japan	Hana Blažíková; Robin Blaze; Gerd Türk; Peter Kooy	BIS	2011	Period

== Sources ==
- Der Herr ist mein getreuer Hirt, BWV 112: Scores at the International Music Score Library Project
- Der Herr ist mein getreuer Hirt BWV 112; BC A 67 / Chorale cantata (3rd Sunday of Easter) Bach Digital
- BWV 112 Der Herr ist mein getreuer Hirt: English translation, University of Vermont
- Luke Dahn: BWV 112.5 bach-chorales.com
