= Now Thank We All Our God =

Christian hymn by Martin Rinkart

Nun danket alle Gott Now Thank We All Our God
- Hymn
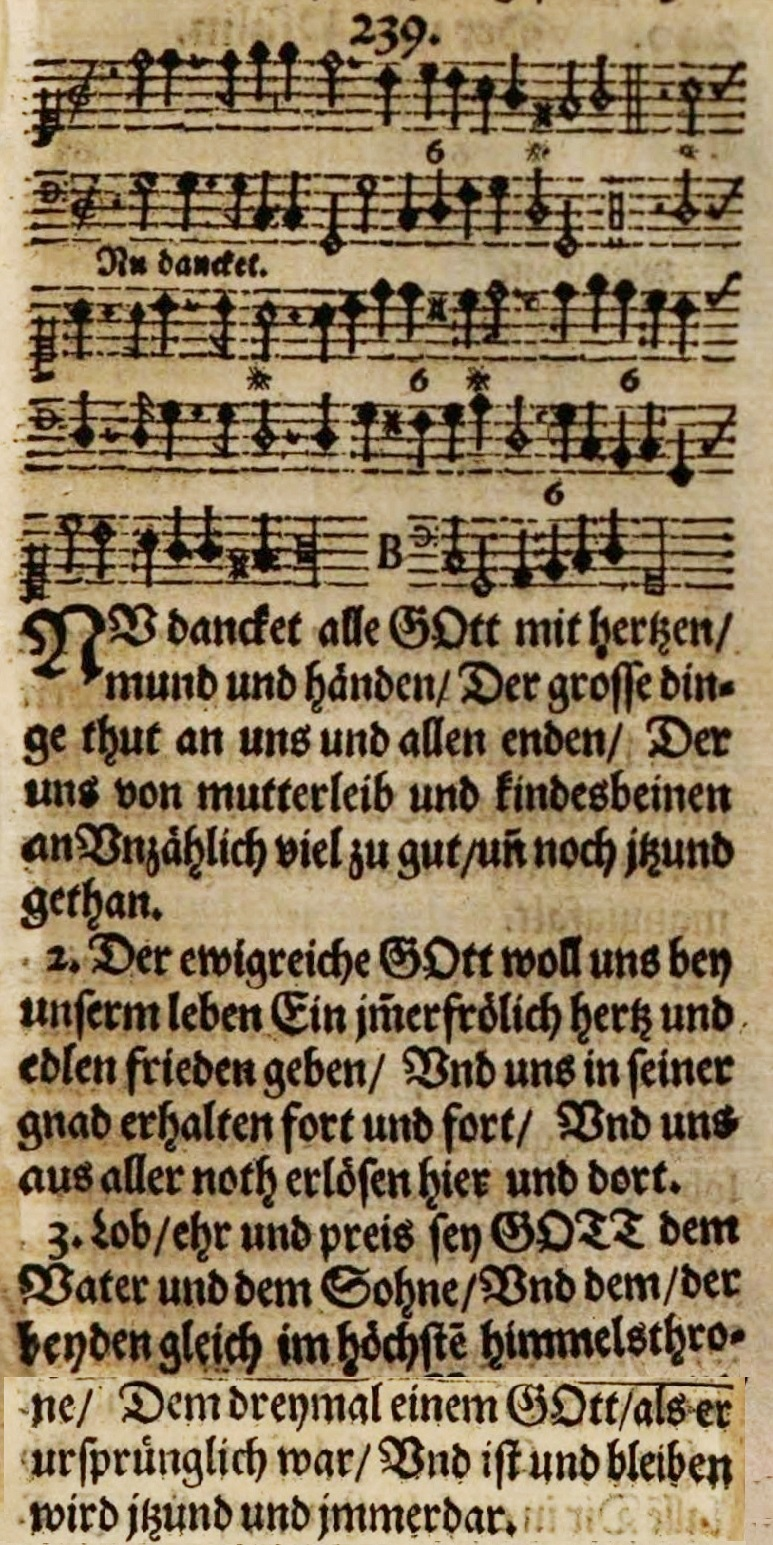
- Text and tune with a figured bass in Johann Crüger's Praxis pietatis melica, 1653
- Catalogue: Zahn 5142
- Written: 1636
- Text: by Martin Rinkart, translated by Catherine Winkworth
- Language: German
- Based on: Ecclesiasticus 50:22-24
- Meter: 6.7.6.7.6.6.6.6
- Melody: attributed to Johann Crüger
- Published: 1647

"Now thank we all our God" is a popular Christian hymn. Catherine Winkworth translated it from the German "Nun danket alle Gott", written c. 1636 by the Lutheran pastor Martin Rinkart. Its hymn tune, Zahn No. 5142, was published by Johann Crüger in the 1647 edition of his Praxis pietatis melica.

== Background ==
Martin Rinkart was a Lutheran pastor who came to Eilenburg, Saxony, at the beginning of the Thirty Years' War. The walled city of Eilenburg became the refuge for political and military fugitives, but the result was overcrowding, deadly pestilence and famine. Armies overran it three times. The Rinkart home was a refuge for the victims, even though he was often hard-pressed to provide for his own family. During the height of a severe plague in 1637, Rinkart was the only surviving pastor in Eilenburg, conducting as many as 50 funerals in a day. He performed more than 4,000 funerals in that year, including that of his wife.

Rinkart was a prolific hymn writer. In Rinkart's Jesu Hertz-Büchlein (Leipzig, 1636), "Nun danket alle Gott" appears under the title "Tisch-Gebetlein", as a short prayer before meals. The exact date is debated, but it is known that it was widely sung by the time the Peace of Westphalia was signed in 1648. Johann Crüger published it in the 1647 edition of his Praxis pietatis melica.

== Text ==
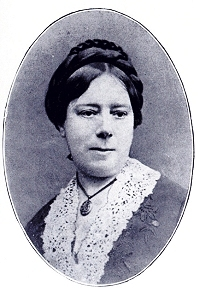
Catherine Winkworth

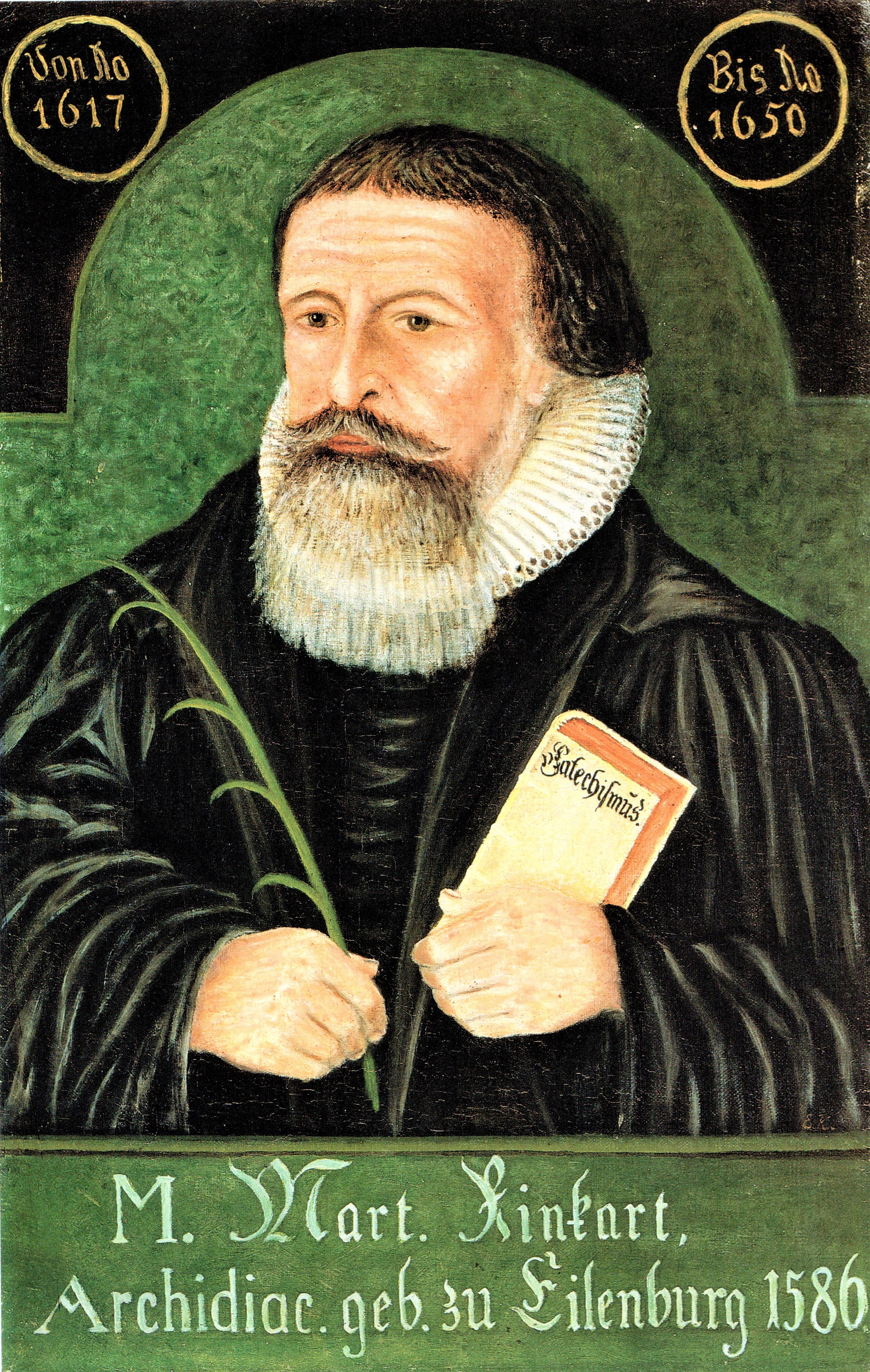
Martin Rinkart

Below is the text in a modern version from the German hymnal Evangelisches Gesangbuch, and a 19th-century translation by Catherine Winkworth:

Nun danket alle Gott
mit Herzen, Mund und Händen,
der große Dinge tut
an uns und allen Enden,
der uns von Mutterleib
und Kindesbeinen an
unzählig viel zu gut
bis hierher hat getan.

Now thank we all our God,
with heart and hands and voices,
Who wondrous things has done,
in Whom this world rejoices;
Who from our mothers’ arms
has blessed us on our way
With countless gifts of love,
and still is ours today.

Der ewig reiche Gott
woll uns in unserm Leben
ein immer fröhlich Herz
und edlen Frieden geben,
und uns in seiner Gnad
erhalten fort und fort,
und uns aus aller Not
erlösen hier und dort.

O may this bounteous God
through all our life be near us,
With ever joyful hearts
and blessed peace to cheer us;
And keep us in His grace,
and guide us when perplexed;
And free us from all ills,
in this world and the next!

Lob, Ehr und Preis sei Gott,
dem Vater und dem Sohne,
und Gott, dem Heilgen Geist
im höchsten Himmelsthrone,
ihm, dem dreieinen Gott,
wie es im Anfang war
und ist und bleiben wird
so jetzt und immerdar.

All praise and thanks to God
the Father now be given;
The Son and Him Who reigns
with Them in highest Heaven;
The one eternal God,
whom earth and Heaven adore;
For thus it was, is now,
and shall be evermore.

== Melody ==
Played on piano

The original version:

However, a modified version is more often used when the hymn is sung in English:

The melody is sometimes attributed to Rinkart, but it is usually considered to be by Johann Crüger, who first published it.

== Musical settings ==
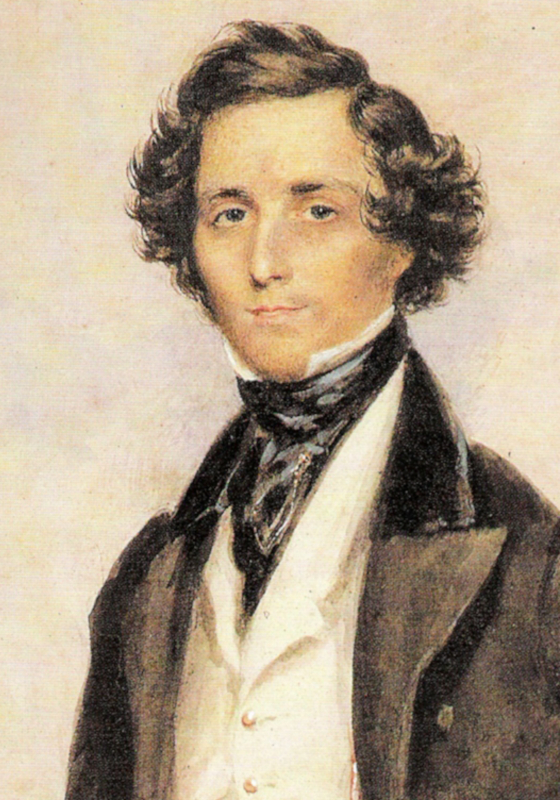
Felix Mendelssohn (1829) by J. W. Childe

It is used in J.S. Bach's cantatas, such as BWV 79, 192 (music lost), harmonized for four voices in BWV 252 and 386, and set in a chorale prelude, BWV 657, as part of the Great Eighteen Chorale Preludes. The now-standard harmonisation was devised by Felix Mendelssohn in 1840 when he adopted the hymn, sung in the now-standard key of G major and with its original German lyrics, as the chorale to his Lobgesang or Hymn of Praise (also known as his Symphony No. 2).

Max Reger composed a chorale prelude as No. 27 of his 52 Chorale Preludes, Op. 67 in 1902. The late-Romantic German composer Sigfrid Karg-Elert used it in his Marche Triomphale. John Rutter composed Now thank we all our God for choir and brass in 1974. In 1977 Czech-American composer Václav Nelhýbel arranged a contemporary setting entitled Now Thank We All Our God: Concertato for 2 trumpets, 2 trombones and organ with tuba and timpani which incorporated "Nun Danket alle Gott" for congregational singing. Hermann Chr. Bühler made an elaborate setting of Johann Crüger's version.

=== Leuthen Chorale ===
It is claimed that after the Battle of Leuthen in 1757, the hymn was taken up by the entire assembled Prussian army. This narrative is, however, questioned by historians and musicologists, who identify the story as a later invention of Prussian propaganda. Because of this story the melody is sometimes known as the Leuthen Chorale.
