= Christian Geist =

German composer and organist

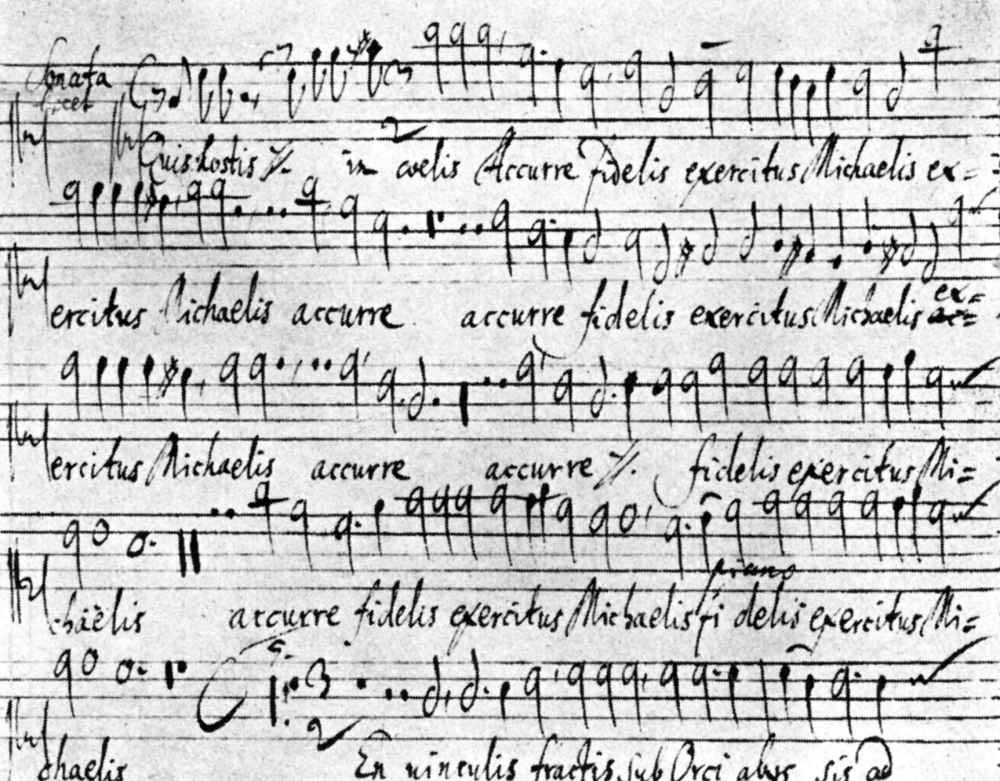
Autograph score of Christian Geist's Quis hostis in coelis a 12, 1672

Christian Geist (c. 1650 – 27 September 1711) was a German composer and organist, who lived and worked mainly in Scandinavia.

== Biography ==
He was born in Güstrow, where his father, Joachim Geist, was cantor at the cathedral school. From 1665–1666 and 1668–1669 he was a boy member of the court orchestra conducted by Daniel Danielis (1635-1696) of Duke Gustav Adolph of Mecklenburg-Güstrow. He was a bass singer at the Danish court music ensemble in Copenhagen in 1669 and in June 1670 moved to the Swedish court orchestra under Gustaf Düben the elder (ca. 1628-1690), a position he held until June 1679, having applied unsuccessfully for the position of choirmaster of St. John's in Hamburg in 1674. He became organist of the German church in Gothenburg, and in November 1684 moved to Copenhagen, where he succeeded J.M. Radeck as organist of the Helligaandskirke, a post he held to his death, and also the Trinitatis Church, after marrying his widow Magdalena Sibylla in May 1685 (a practice by no means rare). He succeeded Johann Lorentz as organist of the Church of Holmen in Copenhagen in 1689. He died, with his third wife and all their children, of the bubonic plague.

== Music ==
Sixty of his vocal works have survived, all but two of a sacred nature, with Latin texts; they were probably composed during his time in Stockholm. Most are intended for court performance, and one third for use in church services, but he also wrote larger works for royal ceremonies; Quis hostis in coelis and Domine in virtute were written for Charles XI's accession to the throne in 1672.

His vocal works are related in form and style to the contemporary Italian concerted motet; indeed, he called them motetto. They are generally in sections which alternate in texture and scoring, and include ariosos or arias for solo voice. The simple counterpoint and expressive harmonic and melodic nature of these works is typically Italian, while his extravagant use of the violin and viol is rooted in the German tradition. His music is somewhat similar to that of Marco Giuseppe Peranda and Vincenzo Albrici, Kaspar Förster, and Dieterich Buxtehude. The manuscripts of his compositions reside in the library of the University of Uppsala, and some have been published as C. Geist: 15 Ausgewählte Kirchenkonzerte, edited by B. Lundgren, in Das Erbe deutscher Musik, 1st series, XLVIII (1960).

Six vocal works on German texts were written during his time as organist of the German church in Gothenburg; they are typical of German Protestant works; chorale settings, sacred arias, and a concerto with aria.

Three organ works of doubtful authorship have been published as Tre koralförspel, ed. Lundgren (Stockholm, 1943); these are chorale preludes on "Allein Gott in der Höh sei Ehr" (All glory be to God on high); Aus tiefer Not schrei ich zu dir (From deep affliction I cry out to you), using the melody by Wolfgang Dachstein rather than the more well-known one by Martin Luther, and Gelobet seist du, Jesu Christ (Praise to you, Jesus Christ). These works fall into the tradition of the North German school of organ music.

== Sources ==
- Kerala J. Snyder/Lars Berglund: 'Geist, Christian', Grove Music Online ed. L. Macy (Accessed 2007-06-07), http://www.grovemusic.com/
- Friedhelm Flamme: notes to recording Organ Works of the North German Baroque III, cpo records 777 246-2
