= 52 chorale preludes, Op. 67 =

52 chorale preludes
- by Max Reger
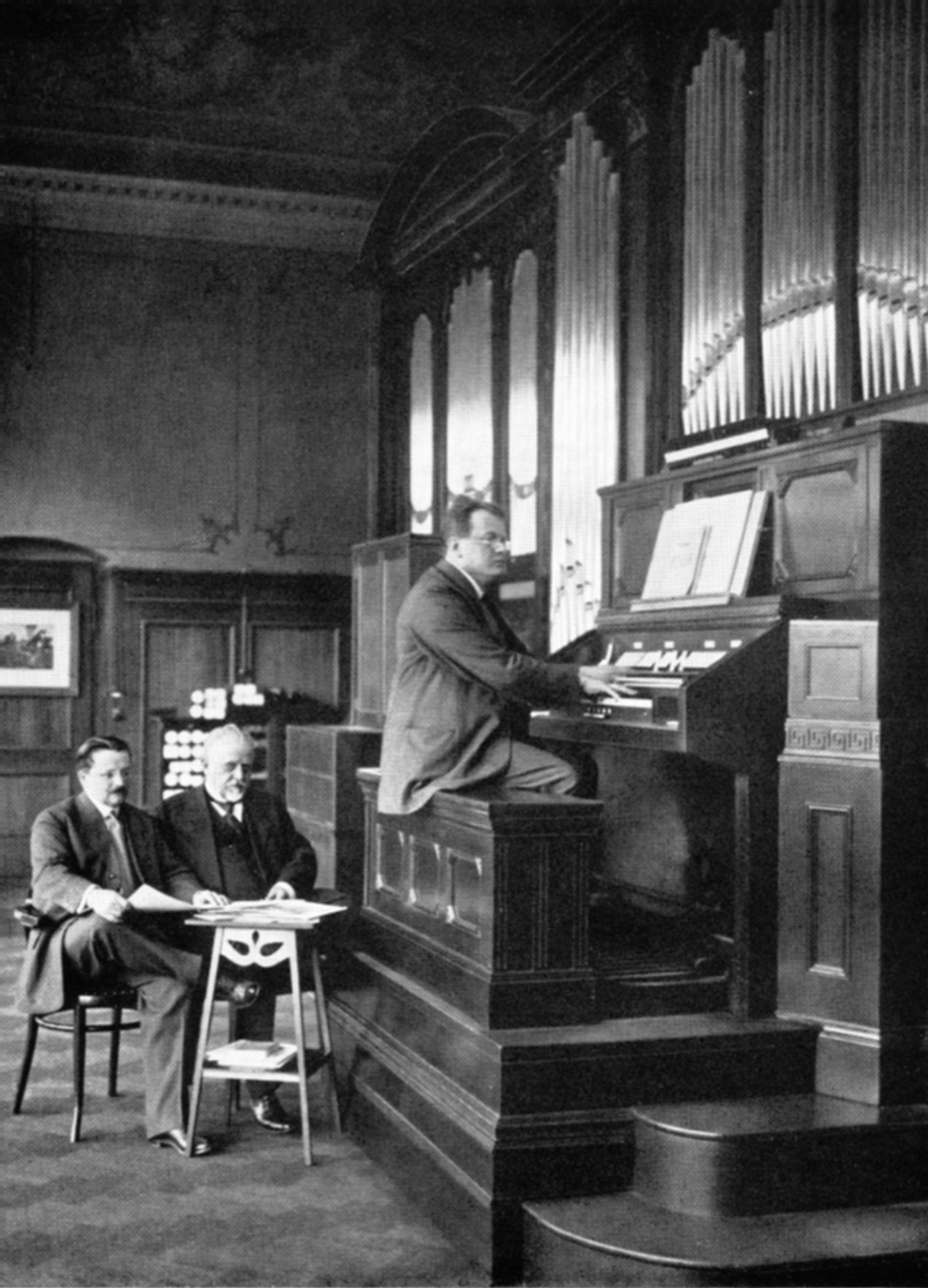
- Max Reger recording organ rolls of some of the chorale preludes on the Welte Philharmonic Organ in 1913
- Native name: Zweiundfünfzig leicht ausführbare Vorspiele zu den gebräuchlichsten evangelischen Chorälen
- Opus: 67
- Based on: Protestant chorales
- Composed: 1900–02
- Published: 1900–03

52 chorale preludes, Op. 67, is a collection of 52 settings of popular Protestant hymns for organ by Max Reger, composed between 1900 and 1902. Originally published in three volumes between 1900 and 1903 with the cover title "52 Choralvorspiele für Orgel" (52 chorale preludes for organ), the full title of the collection was "Zweiundfünfzig leicht ausführbare Vorspiele zu den gebräuchlichsten evangelischen Chorälen".

== Background ==
In a letter to the publishers Lauterbach & Kuhn in 1902 when he had only composed 50 of the chorale preludes, Reger wrote, "None are technically difficult and the melodies have been collected by an organist of 30 years experience. I can surely say without any arrogance that since J. S. Bach, no such collection has been published!" While he composed some settings in Weiden in 1900, he wrote the majority of the prelude in Munich between September 1901 and October 1902. Reger's full title for the collection, "Zweiundfünfzig leicht ausführbare Vorspiele zu den gebräuchlichsten evangelischen Chorälen", has been translated as "Fifty-two easy preludes on the most common Lutheran chorales". They were originally published in three volumes with the cover title "52 Choralvorspiele für Orgel" (52 chorale preludes for organ) between 1900 and 1903: Volume 1, Nos. 1–15; Volume 2, Nos. 16–36; Volume 3, Nos. 37–52.

The idea of writing such a collection dates back to 1893. Its size and form—short pieces with four-part writing and almost no episodes—has similarities with the 46 "minuaturist" chorale preludes of Bach's Orgelbüchlein. The wording of the title reflects Reger's concern that his shorter pieces should be accessible and without technical difficulties: his organ works had previously been criticized for being too difficult and complex. In a 1904 letter to his friend Karl Straube, organist at the Thomaskirche, advising him on which pieces to perform in a Leipzig recital, Reger indicated his own preferences, picking out O Welt ich muß dich lassen and Vater unser as amongst the most beautiful. There is a musical "echo effect" in each of these pieces, with the chorale played a second time only on the manuals with a subdued dynamic. The musicologist Christopher Anderson compares Reger's setting of "O Welt" with the last piece from Eleven Chorale Preludes, Op. 122 of Johannes Brahms, published posthumously in 1902, which uses a double echo effect and has a similar mood of "melancholic leave-taking". Reger's compositional style in the preludes, although intended to be simple from a technical point of view, was musically complex, occasionally mirroring musical features of chorale preludes in Bach's collection: Reger's setting of "Machs mir, Gott, nach deiner Güt" has several similarities with O Mensch, bewein dein Sünde groß, BWV 622—one of Reger's favourites—with the same type of flattened sixth at the close.

Reger's op. 67 represents his most significant contribution to the genre of chorale prelude. In 1916, the musicologist Harvey Grace described it in The Musical Times as showing Reger "at his best". In 1961 the American organist Allan Bacon commented on "the enormous disparity between the various pieces from the standpoint of sheer technical difficulty," describing some as "tenderly naive, flowly gently along" while others were only playable by virtuoso organists like Karl Straube, who championed Reger's works during his lifetime. In his 1939 biography of Reger, Fritz Stein wrote of the chorale preludes in Op. 67 and Op. 79b, "In spite of their contrapuntal art and link with the motivic work of the old organ chorales, they represent no advancement on the depth of religious expression found in Bach's models. Many are merely workmanlike, but if a chorale rests on Reger's innermost religious convictions—such as 'Auf tiefer Not', 'Herzlich tut mich verlangen' and 'O Welt ich muss dich lassen'—then these preludes express pious emotion."

The chorale preludes in Op. 67 can be divided into five types:

- Harmonized chorale prelude. These are the most accessible of the chorale preludes, of varying degrees of complexity. There are eight such preludes (Nos. 19, 20, 29, 33, 37, 45, 50 and 52). They are homophonic, written for four or five voices, with the cantus firmus—the chorale melody—in the soprano, sometimes also shared with the pedal; in No. 52 the melody is wholly in the pedal part. The distinguishing feature of these preludes is that the accompaniment is not constructed from motives derived from the cantus firmus.
- Figural chorale prelude. These form the bulk of the collection, all but thirteen of the preludes having this form. Of the figurative chorales, three are ornamental chorale preludes, a genre described in further detail below. The figural chorale preludes have an accompaniment built up from one or more figure or motif either directly derived from the cantus firmus—often by diminution—or newly composed. The cantus firmus either plays continuously throughout a prelude or can be broken up by short passages of the accompanying motifs. In general the figural chorale preludes show a number of common features: individual pieces have a rhythmic uniformity; the motifs derived from the chorale mostly are limited to introductory bars; the accompaniment is rarely formed from just one motif or rhythmic element; and there is an overall preference for free counterpoint rather than imitation. Harvey Grace criticized Reger's tendency to introduce promising motifs, sometimes heard in imitation between the parts, only to abandon them once the cantus firmus entered.

"Mach's mit mir, Gott, nach deiner Güt", Op.67, No.25

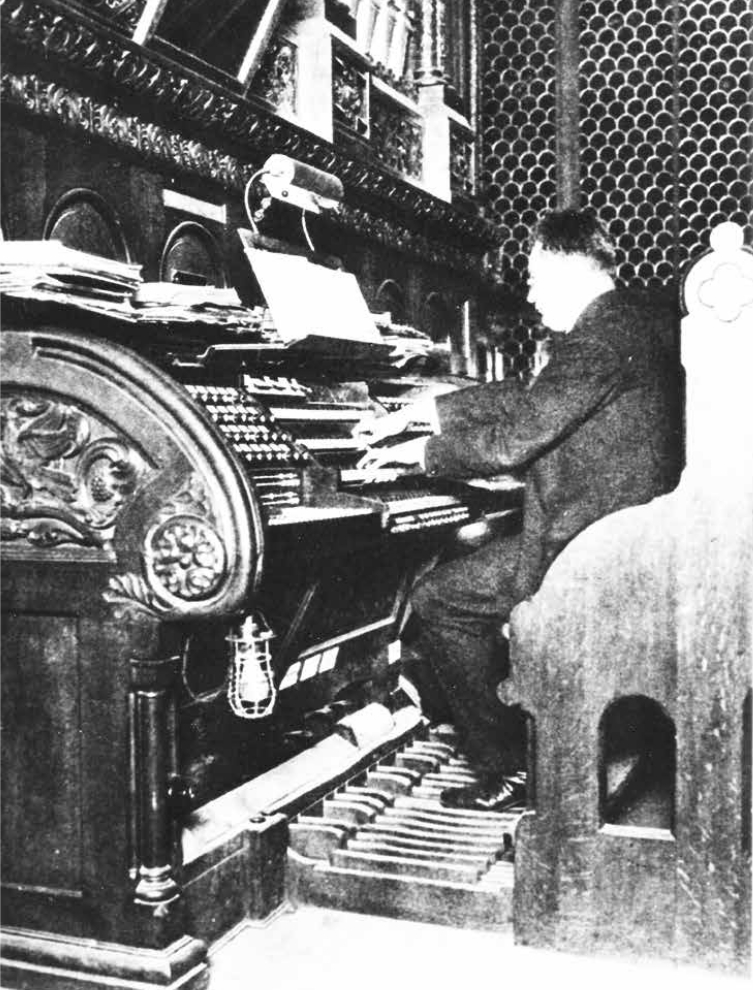
Reger playing the Sauer organ in the Kaiser-Wilhelm-Gedächtniskirche, Berlin

- Ornamental chorale prelude. There are three such chorale preludes (Nos. 5, 13 and 25). Written in 4 parts for two manual keyboards and pedal, they are written in four parts with a highly elaborate version of the cantus firmus in the soprano voice. The elaboration can occasionally become so florid and complex that it is hard to recognize the original melody.
- Canonic chorale prelude. There is only one such prelude, No. 51, written in four parts with the cantus firmus in canon between the soprano part and the pedal.
- Hybrid chorale prelude. There are four such preludes (Nos. 38, 39, 43 and 49), which mix two of the above genres: in the first three some phrases are set according to the figural model, with a motivic accompaniment for the cantus firmus; the other "echo" responses take the simpler form of homophonic chorale harmonizations.

In 1913 Reger recorded organ rolls of Nos. 20, 23, 25, 33, 45, 50 and 52 on the mechanical Philharmonic Organ (Philharmonie-Orgel) of the Welte Company. Welte brought out this organ in 1911, displaying it that year at the World Exhibition in Turin. Two years later they solicited recordings from well-known organists on an improved model in their factory in Freiburg. (Note: Regarded at the time as instruments of prestige, Philharmonic Organs were built for worldwide distribution, including for Harrods in London and for the ocean liner HMHS Britannic, sister ship of RMS Titanic; the onset of World War I prevented installation of the organ on the Britannic, which sunk in the Aegean Sea in 1916 while serving as a hospital ship.)

The tempos for many of the chorale preludes are slow, as illustrated in Reger's own recordings; when he indicated a slow tempo, he would frequently add parenthetically "but not dragging". As Anderson (2013) explains, in pieces like "Aus tiefer Not, schrei ich zu dir" (No. 3), "Jauchs, Erd, und Himmel, juble hell" (No. 15) and "Mach's mit mir, Gott, nach deiner Güt" (No. 25), a more moderate tempo enables the listener to take in the changing sonorities, subtle dissonances or brilliant semiquaver passage work on the organ. Although the latest German organs in Reger's day, built by Sauer and Walcker, had special devices to control the dynamics, there are now established ways—which can involve using assistants to change organ stops—to produce similar effects on organs of different construction.

== Chorale preludes ==
"Wer nur den lieben Gott lässt walten", Op.67, No.45

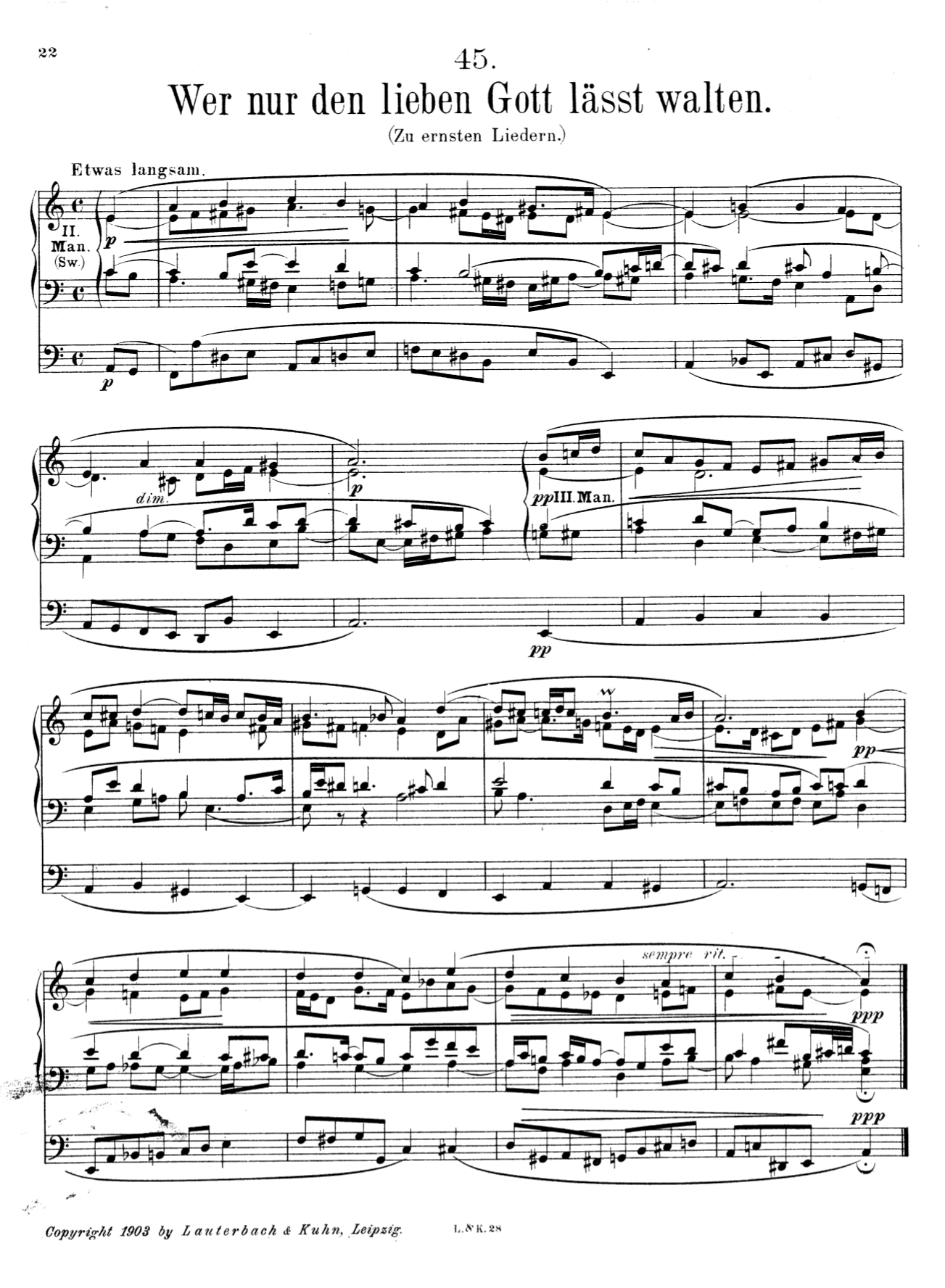
"Wer nur den lieben Gott lässt walten", Op. 67, No. 45, an example of a harmonized chorale prelude

The 52 pieces are based on the following chorales which are mostly arranged alphabetically. The chorale preludes fall into five types: harmonized chorale (H); figural chorale prelude (F) with a motivic accompaniment often derived from the melody of the chorale; canonic chorale prelude (C) with the chorale in canon between two voices; ornamental chorale prelude (O) with a highly elaborate version of the chorale in the highest voice; and hybrid chorale prelude (Hy), a combination of the above. The list also specifies the number of voices in the piece and indicates which voices (SATB and P for pedal) share the cantus firmus (c.f.).

1. Allein Gott in der Höh sei Ehr: F, 4, c.f. in P
2. Alles ist an Gottes Segen: F, 4, c.f. in T
3. Aus tiefer Not schrei ich zu dir: F, 5, c.f. in P
4. Aus meines Herzens Grunde: F, 4, c.f. in S
5. Christus, der ist mein Leben: O, 4, c.f. in S
6. Ein feste Burg ist unser Gott: F, 4, c.f. in S & P
7. Dir, dir, Jehovah, will ich singen!: F, 4, c.f. in S
8. Erschienen ist der herrlich' Tag: F, 4, c.f. in P
9. Herr Jesu Christ, dich zu uns wend: F, 4, c.f. in S
10. Es ist das Heil uns kommen her: F, 4, c.f. in S
11. Freu' dich sehr, o meine Seele: F, 4, c.f. in S, T & P
12. Gott des Himmels und der Erden:F, 4, c.f. in S
13. Herr, wie du willst, so schick's mit mir: O, 4, c.f. in S
14. Herzlich tut mich verlangen: F, 5, c.f. in S
15. Jauchz, Erd, und Himmel, juble hell: F, 4, c.f. in P
16. Ich dank dir, lieber Herre: F, 4, c.f. in S
17. Ich will dich lieben, meine Stärke: F, 5, c.f. in P
18. Jerusalem, du hochgebaute Stadt:F, 4, c.f. in S
19. Jesu Leiden, Pein und Tod: H, 5, c.f. in S
20. Jesus, meine Zuversicht: H, 4, c.f. in S
21. Jesu, meine Freude: F, 4, c.f. in T
22. Komm, o komm, du Geist des Lebens: F, 4, c.f. in S
23. Lobt Gott, ihr Christen alle gleich: F, 5, c.f. in P
24. Lobe den Herren, den mächtigen König: F, 4+, c.f. in P
25. Mach's mit mir, Gott, nach deiner Güt: O, 4, c.f. in S
26. Meinen Jesum laß' ich nicht: F, 4, c.f. in T
27. Nun danket alle Gott: F, 4, c.f. in S
28. Nun freut euch, lieben Christen: F, 4, c.f. in T
29. Nun komm, der Heiden Heiland: H, 5, c.f. in S
30. O Gott, du frommer Gott: F, 4, c.f. in S
31. O Jesu Christ, meines Lebens Licht: F, 4, c.f. in P
32. O Lamm Gottes, unschuldig: F, 4, c.f. in S
33. O Welt, ich muß dich lassen: H, 5, c.f. in S
34. Schmücke dich, o liebe Seele: F, 4, c.f. in S
35. Seelenbräutigam: F, 4, c.f. in T
36. Sollt' ich meinem Gott nicht singen?: F, 4+, c.f. in S & P
37. Straf mich nicht in deinem Zorn: H, 4–5, c.f. in S & P
38. Valet will ich dir geben: Hy, 4+, c.f. in S
39. Vater unser im Himmelreich: Hy, 5, c.f. in S
40. Vom Himmel hoch, da komm ich her: F, 4, c.f. in S
41. Wachet auf, ruft uns die Stimme: F, 5, c.f. in S & P
42. Von Gott will ich nicht lassen: F, 4, c.f. in P
43. Warum sollt' ich mich den grämen: Hy, 4–5, c.f. in S
44. Was Gott tut, das ist wohlgetan: F, 5, c.f. in P
45. Wer nur den lieben Gott lässt walten: H, 5, c.f. in S & P
46. Wer nur den lieben Gott lässt walten: F, 5, c.f. in S
47. Werde munter, mein Gemüte: F, 5, c.f. in S
48. Wer weiß, wie nahe mir mein Ende: F, 4, c.f. in S
49. Wie schön leucht't uns der Morgenstern: Hy, 4–5, c.f. in S
50. Wie wohl ist mir, o Freund der Seelen: H, 5, c.f. in S
51. Jesus ist kommen: C, 4, c.f. in S & P
52. O wie selig: H, 5, c.f. in P
