= Herr Jesu Christ, dich zu uns wend =

17th-century German Christian hymn

- Lutheran hymn
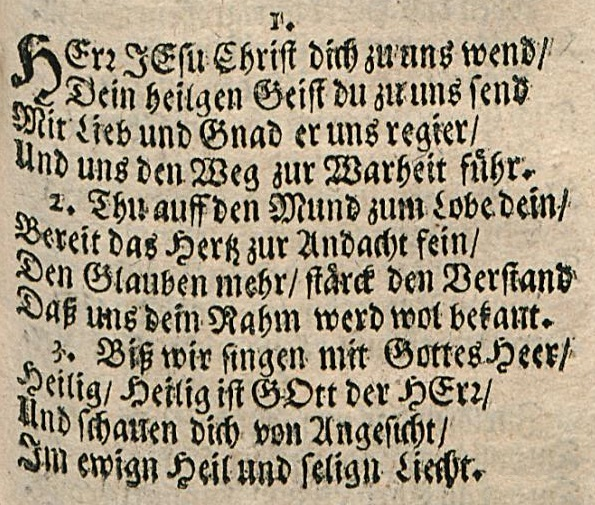
- Print in Johannes Niedling's Lutherisch Hand-Büchlein, 6th edition of 1668
- English: "Lord Jesus Christ, be present now!"
- Catalogue: Zahn 624
- Text: by Wilhelm, Duke of Saxe-Weimar (attributed)
- Language: German
- Published: 1648

"Herr Jesu Christ, dich zu uns wend" ("Lord Jesus Christ, be present now!", literally: Lord Jesus Christ, turn to us) is a Lutheran hymn from the 17th century. Its hymn tune, Zahn No. 624, was adopted in several compositions. It was translated into English and is part of modern hymnals, both Protestant and Catholic.

== History ==
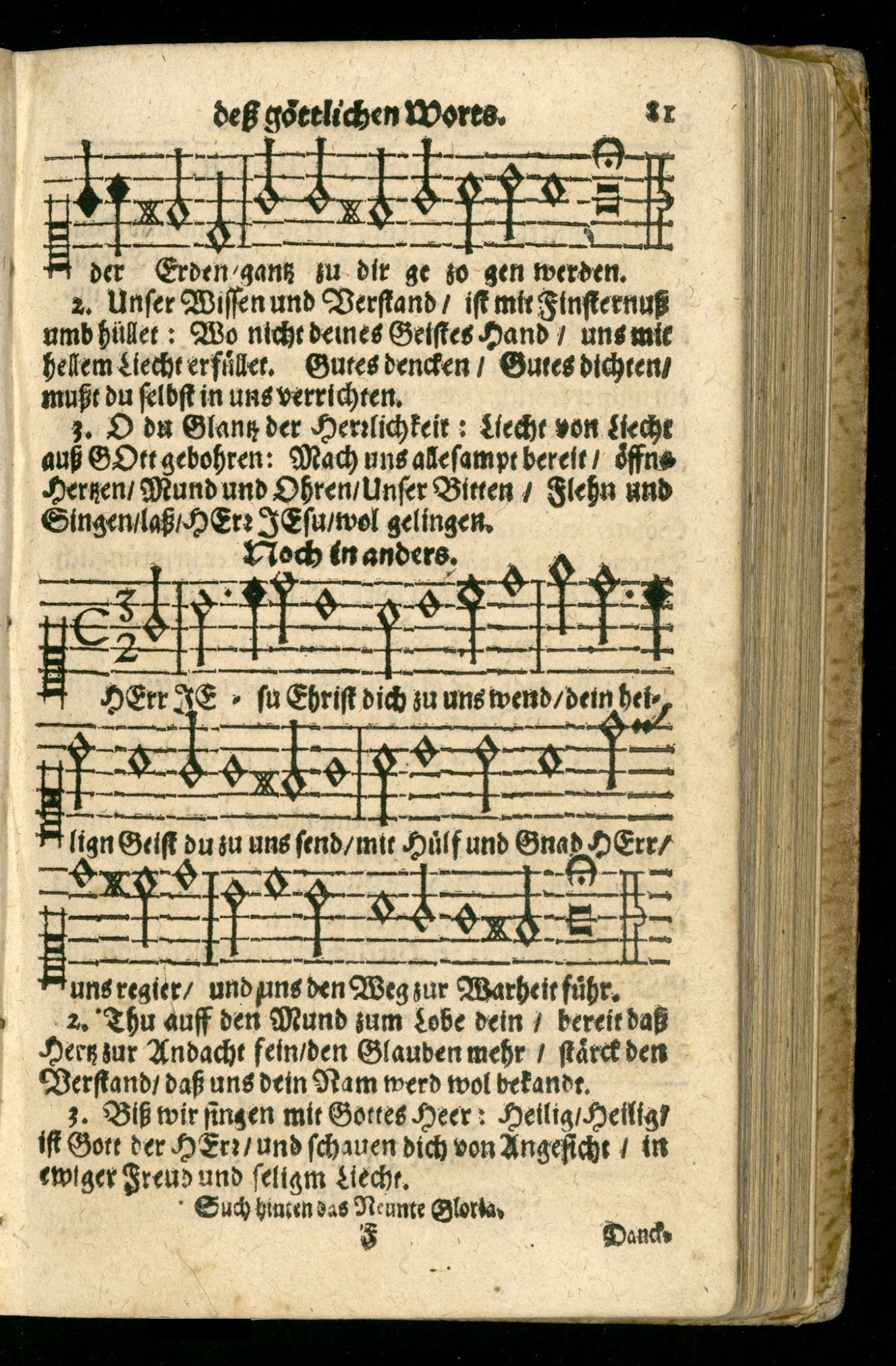
Hymn in 1691 Württemberg hymnal with soprano clef

The text of the hymn has been attributed to Wilhelm, Duke of Saxe-Weimar, but this authorship is doubted, as the attribution appears only in prints from the late 17th century. In Thuringia and Saxony, the hymn was sung on Sundays after the minister had entered the pulpit to deliver the sermon. In a 1668 print, the 6th edition of Lutherisch Hand-Büchlein (Lutheran handbooklet) it is assigned to Trinity Sunday (Am Fest der heiligen Dreyfaltigkeit).

== Text and translations ==
The hymn was translated into Swedish in 1695 by Johannes Gezelius, with the title "O Jesus Krist, dig till oss vänd". The hymn was translated in the 1722 Psalmodica Germanica of Johann Christian Jacobi as "Lord Christ, reveal thy holy Face". Catherine Winkworth translated the hymn in 1863 as a communion song with the title "Lord Jesu Christ, be present now!" The English translations below are those of Jacobi.

1
Herr Jesu Christ, dich zu uns wend,
dein’ Heilgen Geist du zu uns send;
mit Hilf und Gnad er uns regier
und uns den Weg zur Wahrheit führ.

2
Tu auf den Mund zum Lobe dein,
bereit das Herz zur Andacht fein,
den Glauben mehr, stärk den Verstand,
dass uns dein Nam werd wohlbekannt,

3
bis wir singen mit Gottes Heer:
"Heilig, heilig ist Gott der Herr!"
und schauen dich von Angesicht
in ewger Freud und selgem Licht.

4
Ehr sei dem Vater und dem Sohn,
dem Heilgen Geist in einem Thron;
der Heiligen Dreieinigkeit
sei Lob und Preis in Ewigkeit.

Lord Christ, reveal thy holy Face,
And send the Spirit of thy Grace,
To fill our Hearts with fervent Zeal
To learn thy Truth, and do thy Will.

Lord, lead us in thy holy Ways,
And teach our Lips to tell thy Praise,
Increase our Faith, and raise the same
To taste the Sweetness of thy Name.

Till we with Angels join to sing
Th'eternal Praise of Thee, our King;
Till we shall see Thee Face to Face,
And all the Glories of thy Grace.

To God the Father, God the Son,
And God the Spirit, Three in One,
Be Honour, Praise, and Glory giv'n,
By all on Earth, and all in Heav'n.

== Musical settings ==
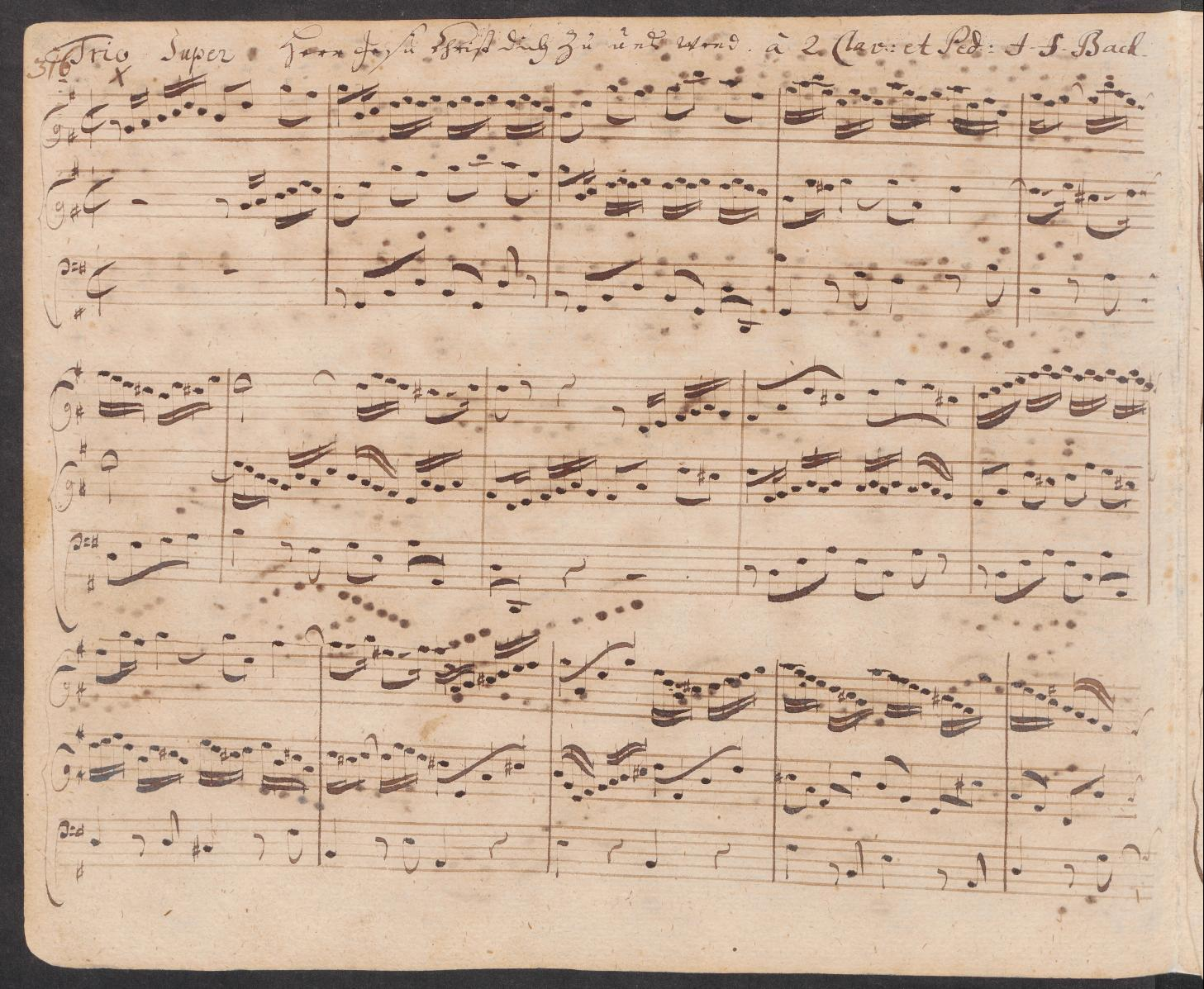
First page of manuscript of Herr Jesu Christ, dich zu uns wend, BWV 655a, by Bach, copied by Krebs

BWV 632
from the Orgelbüchlein

BWV 655
from the Great Eighteen Chorale Preludes

In Weimar, Johann Sebastian Bach and his cousin Johann Gottfried Walther, who were the organists at the Schlosskirche and the Stadtkirche, both composed several settings of the hymn. Georg Böhm, Walther and Johann Ludwig Krebs all wrote chorale partitas and variations on the hymn: Krebs wrote a chorale fantasia Krebs-WV 524. Among the most notable settings by Bach are the chorale preludes BWV 632, from the Orgelbüchlein, and BWV 655, from the Great Eighteen Chorale Preludes. There are further chorale preludes BWV 709, 726 and 749, with questions over the third's authenticity.

Max Reger composed a chorale prelude as No. 9 of his 52 Chorale Preludes, Op. 67 in 1902. He also set it in 1914 as No. 11 of his 30 little chorale preludes for organ, Op. 135a.

== Hymnals ==
In the Protestant hymnal Evangelisches Gesangbuch it is EG 155, the first hymn in the section Gottesdienst – Eingang und Ausgang (Service – beginning and end). In the Catholic hymnal Gotteslob it is GL 147, in the section Messgesänge – Gesänge zur Eröffnung (Songs for mass – songs for the opening).
