= Nikolaus Decius =

German monk and hymnwriter

Former Franziskanerkloster, School of Nikolaus Decius in Hof

Nikolaus Decius (also Degius, Deeg, Tech a Curia, and Nickel von Hof; c. 1485 – 21 March 1541 (others say 1546) was a German monk, hymn-writer, Protestant reformer and composer.

== Biography ==
He was probably born in Hof in Upper Franconia, Bavaria, around 1485. He studied at the University of Leipzig and obtained a master's degree at Wittenburg University in 1523 and became a monk. Although a monk, he was an advocate of the Protestant Reformation and a disciple of Martin Luther. He was Probst of the cloister at Steterburg from 1519 until July 1522 when he was appointed a master in the St. Katherine and Egidien School in Braunschweig. He wrote in 1523 "Allein Gott in der Höh sei Ehr", a German paraphrase of the Latin Gloria, adapted by Luther in 1525. Decius's version was first sung on Easter Day at Braunschweig on 5 April 1523. Decius's Low German version first appeared in print in Gesang Buch by Joachim Sluter, printed in 1525.

In 1526, Decius became preacher at the Church of St. Nicholas in Stettin at the same time as Paulus von Rhode was appointed preacher at St. James's in Stettin. In 1535 he became pastor of St. Nicholas and died there in March 1541 after a suspected poisoning. Shortly before his death he wrote the hymn "O Lamm Gottes, unschuldig" (O Lamb of God, innocent) sung on a tune from the 13th century. Decius's version was first published in Anton Cornivus's Christliche Kirchen-Ordnung in 1542. Johann Sebastian Bach used it as a cantus firmus in the opening chorus of his St Matthew Passion. It was translated into English by Arthur Tozer Russell in the 19th century.

== Sources ==
- Ludger Stühlmeyer: Nikolaus Decius – ein Kirchenlieddichter aus Hochfranken. In: Jahrbuch der Erzdiözese Bamberg 2014. Heinrichs-Verlag Bamberg, 89. Jahrgang 2013, S. 72–76.
- Ludger Stühlmeyer: Die Kirchenlieder des Hofers Nicolaus Decius. In:Curia sonans. Die Musikgeschichte der Stadt Hof. Eine Studie zur Kultur Oberfrankens. Von der Gründung des Bistums Bamberg bis zur Gegenwart. Phil.Diss., Bayerische Verlagsanstalt, Heinrichs-Verlag Bamberg 2010, ISBN 978-3-89889-155-4, S. 110–112, 135–137, 357–358.
- Werner Merten: Decius, Nikolaus. In: Wolfgang Herbst: Wer ist wer im Gesangbuch? S. 73-74 Vandenhoeck & Ruprecht, 2001, ISBN 3-525-50323-7
- Friedrich Wilhelm Bautz (1975). "DECIUS (Tech), Nikolaus". In Bautz, Friedrich Wilhelm (ed.). Biographisch-Bibliographisches Kirchenlexikon (BBKL) (in German). Vol. 1. Hamm: Bautz. cols. 1239–1240. ISBN 3-88309-013-1.
- Th. Ruys. P. D. Utrecht 1919 (Diss. Amsterdam). H. J. Jaanus. P. D. (Documenta Reformatoria 1960, 247ff.).
- Siegfried Fornaçon (1957). "Decius, Nikolaus". Neue Deutsche Biographie (in German). Vol. 3. Berlin: Duncker & Humblot. pp. 542–543. (full text online).
