= Wolfgang Musculus =

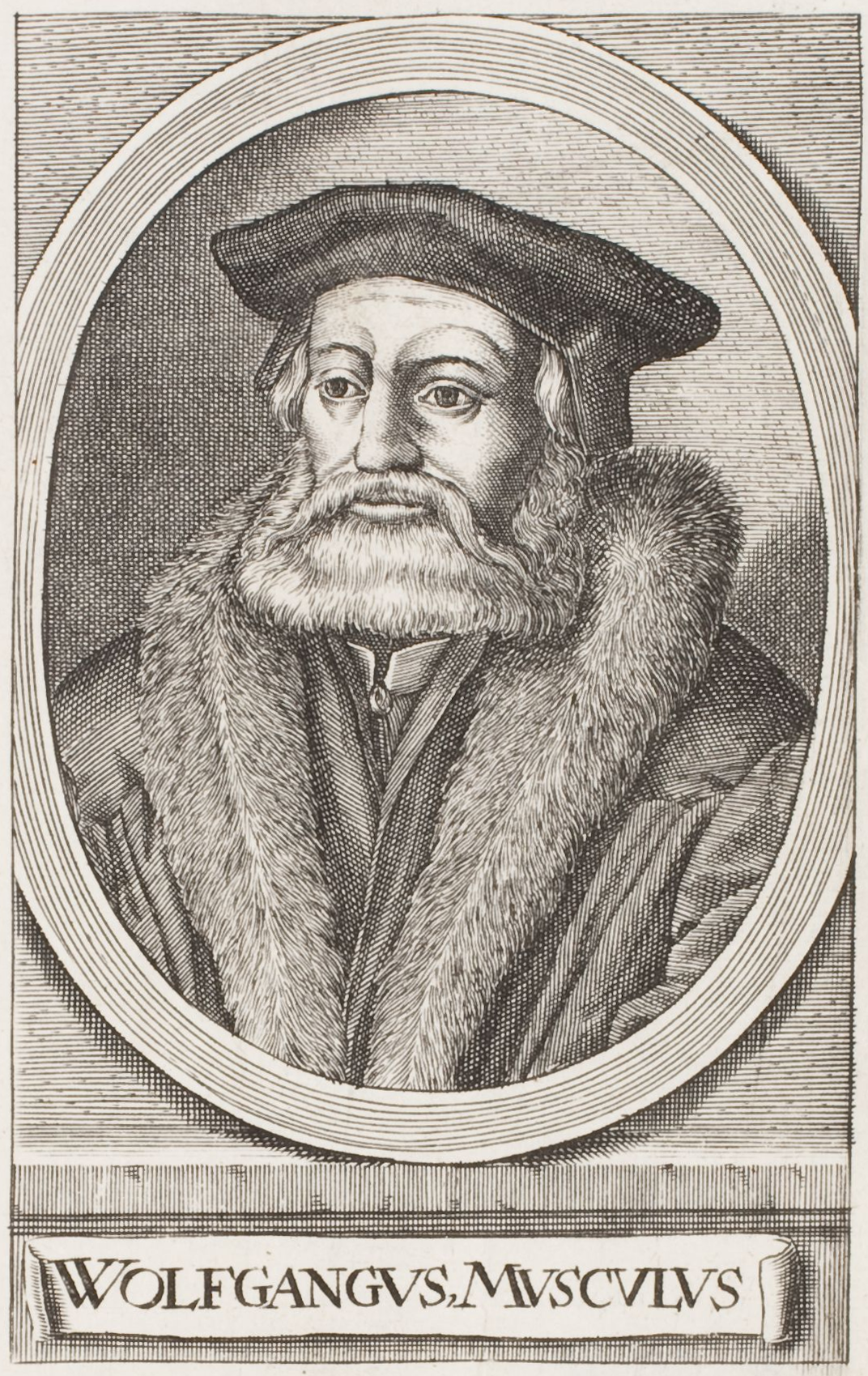
Wolfgang Musculus

Wolfgang Musculus (born Müslin or Mauslein; 10 September 1497 – 30 August 1563) was a Reformed theologian of the Protestant Reformation.

== Life ==
Musculus was a native of Alsace, along the French/German border. He was born in the village of Duss (Moselle), in a German-speaking area (French-speaking, from the Thirty Years War). Musculus was a lover of song and of knowledge, of languages, Humanism and religion. The oral tradition of his songs is still found in the churches of the Reformation.

In 1527, he left the Benedictine monastery at Lixheim (now in the area of Moselle), to serve as deacon of the Cathedral of Our Lady of Strasbourg (French: Cathédrale Notre-Dame-de-Strasbourg) while studying under Bucer and Capito. He also served as preaching assistant to Matthäus Zell. He left for Augsburg in 1531, and started publishing treatises regarding Anabaptists, Roman Catholicism and the Lord’s Supper, as well as translating works by John Chrysostom and Basil the Great.

After 17 years of service, he left the town as a protest against the introduction of the Augsburg Interim, and came to Switzerland, where he was the primary professor of theology at Bern from 1549. At Bern, he wrote several biblical commentaries and Loci communes sacrae theologiae (Common Places of the Christian Religion), a major systematic theology.

J. S. Bach used Musculus' 1530 hymn, a paraphrase of Psalm 23, as the text for his chorale cantata Der Herr ist mein getreuer Hirt, BWV 112, which he first performed in Leipzig in 1731.

He also published a book on usury entitled De usuris ex verbo dei, in which he criticized the practice of the triple contract, and a German version of which appeared in Strasbourg in 1593.

== Publications ==
Musculus' books included;

- Commentary on the Gospel of Matthew, 1544
- Commentary on the Gospel of John, 1545
- Loci communes sacrae theologiae (Common places of Christian religion), 1563
- Dissertatio de Icuncula Quondam Regis Aelfredi...
- On Righteousness Oaths and Usury
- Topicos Comuns da Religiao Crista

He also published several Bible commentaries including commentaries on Psalms (1551), Decalogue (1553), Genesis (1554), Romans (1555), Isaiah (1557), 1 and 2 Corinthians (1559), Galatians and Ephesians (1561), Philippians, Colossians, 1 and 2 Thessalonians, and 1 Timothy (1565).

== Bibliography ==
- Ballor, Jordan (2012). Covenant, Causality, and Law: A Study in the Theology of Wolfgang Musculus. Vandenhoeck & Ruprecht. p. 270. ISBN 978-3-525-55036-6.
- Farmer, Craig (1997). The Gospel of John in the Sixteenth Century: The Johannine Exegesis of Wolfgang Musculus. Oxford University Press. p. 250. ISBN 0-19-509903-6.
- McKim, Donald Keith; Wright, David Frederick (1992). Encyclopedia of the Reformed faith. Westminster John Knox Press. p. 248. ISBN 978-0-664-21882-9.
- Musculus, Common places, Pædocommunion. The Validity of Children at the Lord's Table in the Words of an Early Reformed Theologian.
- Musculus, Wolfgang (2008) [1551]. "Commentary on Psalm 15". Journal of Markets & Morality. 11 (2). Introduction by Jordan J. Ballor, Translation by Todd M. Rester. Includes appendices on oaths and usury.
- Musculus, Wolfgang (2013). On Righteousness, Oaths, and Usury: A Commentary on Psalm 15. CLP Academic. p. 160. ISBN 978-1-938-94872-5. Archived from the original on 25 April 2018..
