= Great Eighteen Chorale Preludes =

Organ pieces by Johann Sebastian Bach

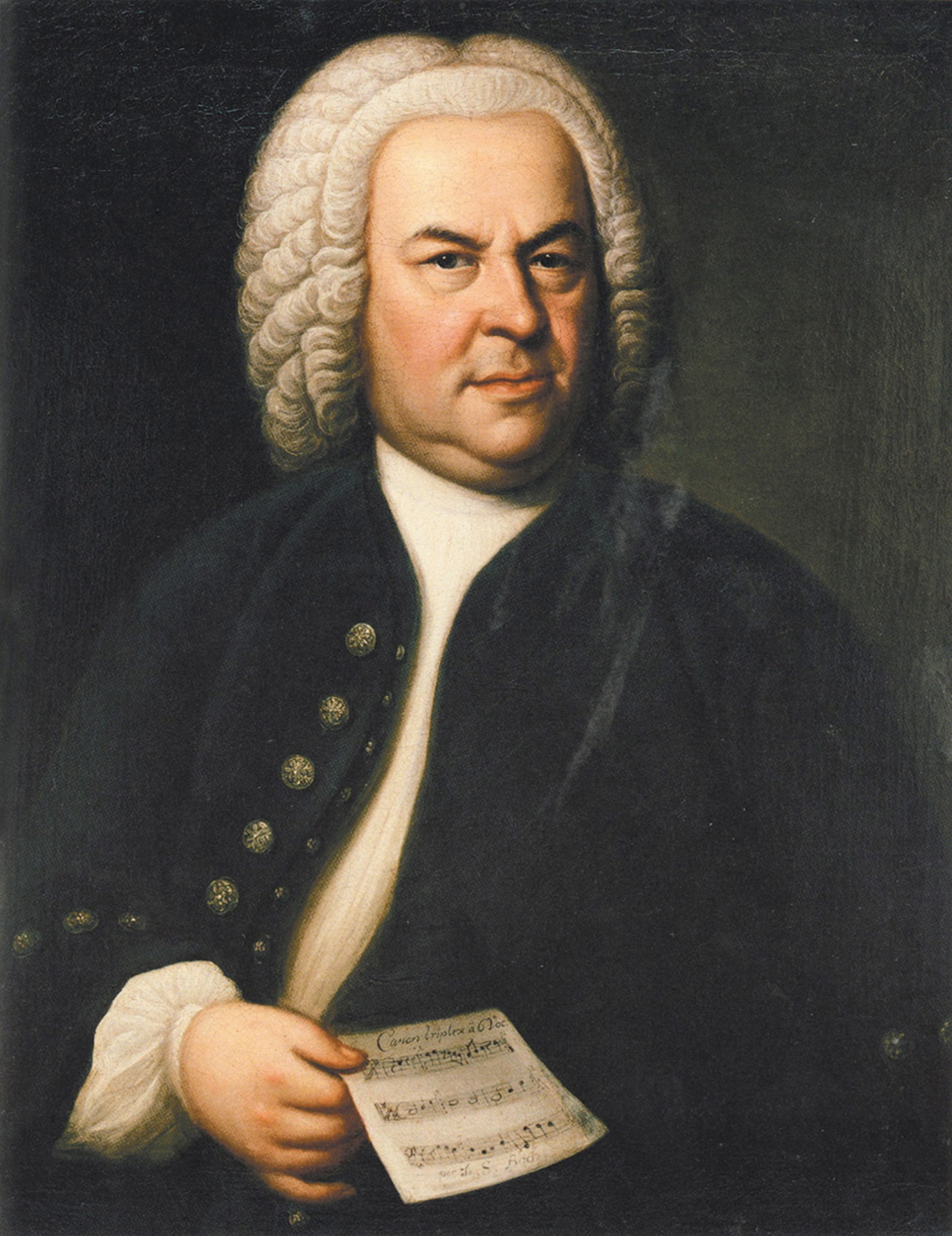
Johann Sebastian Bach, 1746

The Great Eighteen Chorale Preludes, BWV 651–668, are a set of chorale preludes for organ prepared by Johann Sebastian Bach in Leipzig in his final decade (1740–1750), from earlier works composed in Weimar, where he was court organist. The works form an encyclopedic collection of large-scale chorale preludes, in a variety of styles harking back to the previous century, that Bach gradually perfected during his career. Together with the Orgelbüchlein, the Schübler Chorales, the third book of the Clavier-Übung and the Canonic Variations, they represent the summit of Bach's sacred music for solo organ.

== History ==
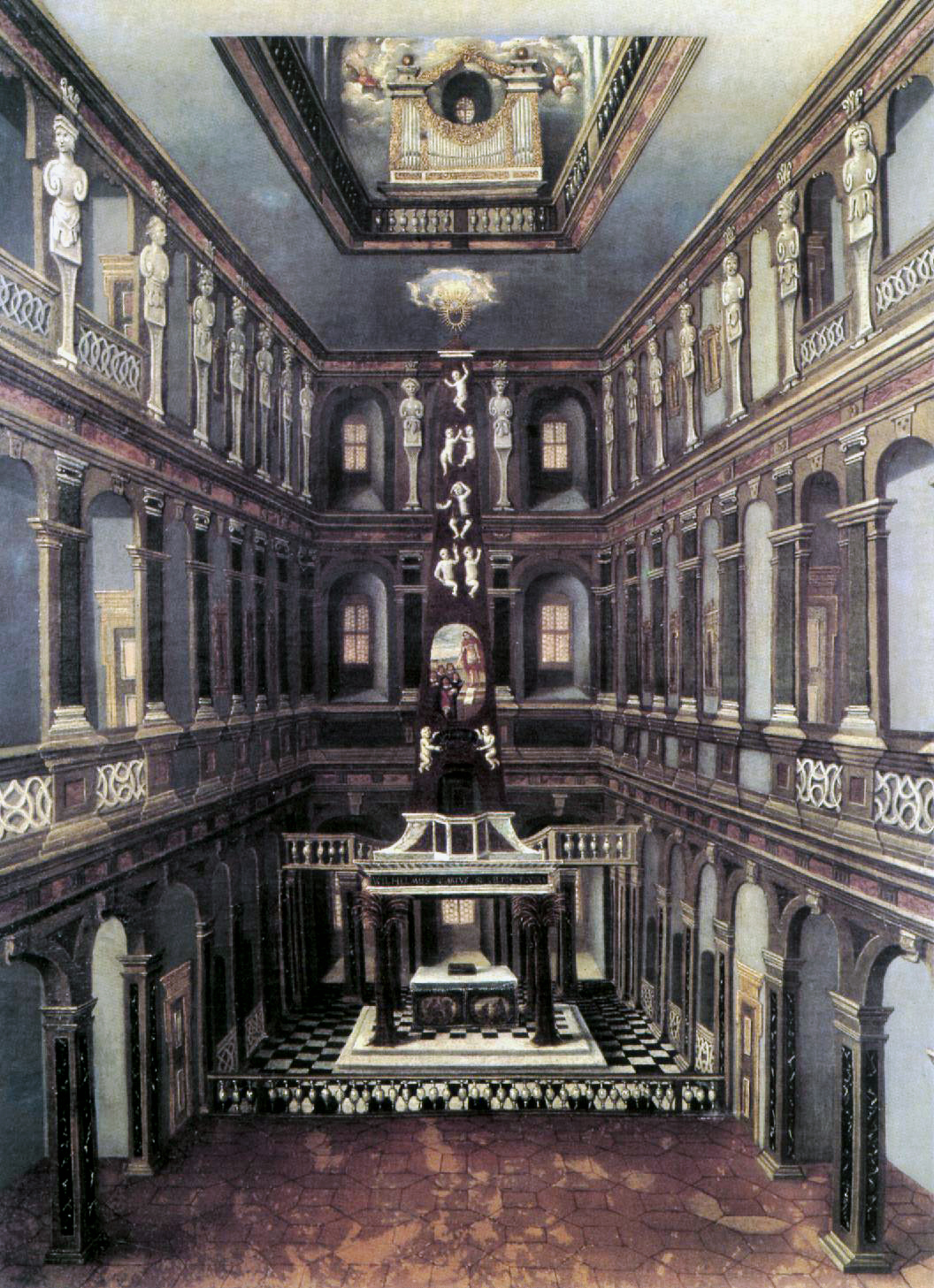
The court chapel at the Schloss in Weimar where Bach was court organist. The organ loft is visible at the top of the picture.

Early versions of almost all the chorale preludes are thought to date back to 1710–1714, during the period 1708–1717 when Bach served as court organist and Konzertmeister (director of music) in Weimar, at the court of Wilhelm Ernst, Duke of Saxe-Weimar. As a result of encouragement from the Duke, a devout Lutheran and music lover, Bach developed secular and liturgical organ works in all forms, in what was to be his most productive period for organ composition. As his son Carl Philipp Emanuel Bach mentions in his obituary or nekrolog: "His grace's delight in his playing fired him to attempt everything possible in the art of how to treat the organ. Here he also wrote most of his organ works." During Bach's time at Weimar, the chapel organ there was extensively improved and enlarged; occupying a loft at the east end of the chapel just below the roof, it had two manual keyboards, a pedalboard and about a dozen stops, including at Bach's request a row of tuned bells. It is probable that the longer chorale preludes composed then served some ceremonial function during the services in the court chapel, such as accompanying communion.

When Bach moved to his later positions as Kapellmeister in Köthen in 1717 and cantor at the Thomaskirche in Leipzig in 1723, his obligations did not specifically include compositions for the organ. The autograph manuscript of the Great Eighteen, currently preserved as P 271 in the Berlin State Library, documents that Bach began to prepare the collection around 1740, after having completed Part III of the Clavier-Übung in 1739. The manuscript is made up of three parts: the six trio sonatas for organ BWV 525–530 (1727–1732); the Canonic Variations on "Vom Himmel hoch da komm' ich her" BWV 769 added at the same time as the chorale preludes (1739–1750); and an early version of Nun komm' der heiden Heiland (1714–1717), appended after Bach's death.

The first thirteen chorale preludes BWV 651–663 were added by Bach himself between 1739 and 1742, supplemented by BWV 664 and 665 in 1746–7. In 1750 when Bach began to suffer from blindness before his death in July, BWV 666 and 667 were dictated to his student and son-in-law Johann Christoph Altnikol and copied posthumously into the manuscript. Only the first page of the last choral prelude BWV 668, the so-called "deathbed chorale", has survived, recorded by an unknown copyist. The piece was posthumously published in 1751 as an appendix to the Art of the Fugue, with the title "Wenn wir in höchsten Nöthen sein" (BWV 668a), instead of the original title "Vor deinen Thron tret ich hiermit" ("Before your throne I now appear").

There have been various accounts of the circumstances surrounding the composition of this chorale. The biographical account from 1802 of Johann Nicolaus Forkel that Altnikol was copying the work at the composer's deathbed has since been discounted: in the second half of the eighteenth century, it had become an apocryphal legend, encouraged by Bach's heirs, Carl Philipp Emmanuel Bach and Wilhelm Friedmann Bach. The piece, however, is now accepted as a planned reworking of the shorter chorale prelude Wenn wir in höchsten Nöthen sein (BWV 641) from the Orgelbüchlein (c 1715).

== Compositional models ==
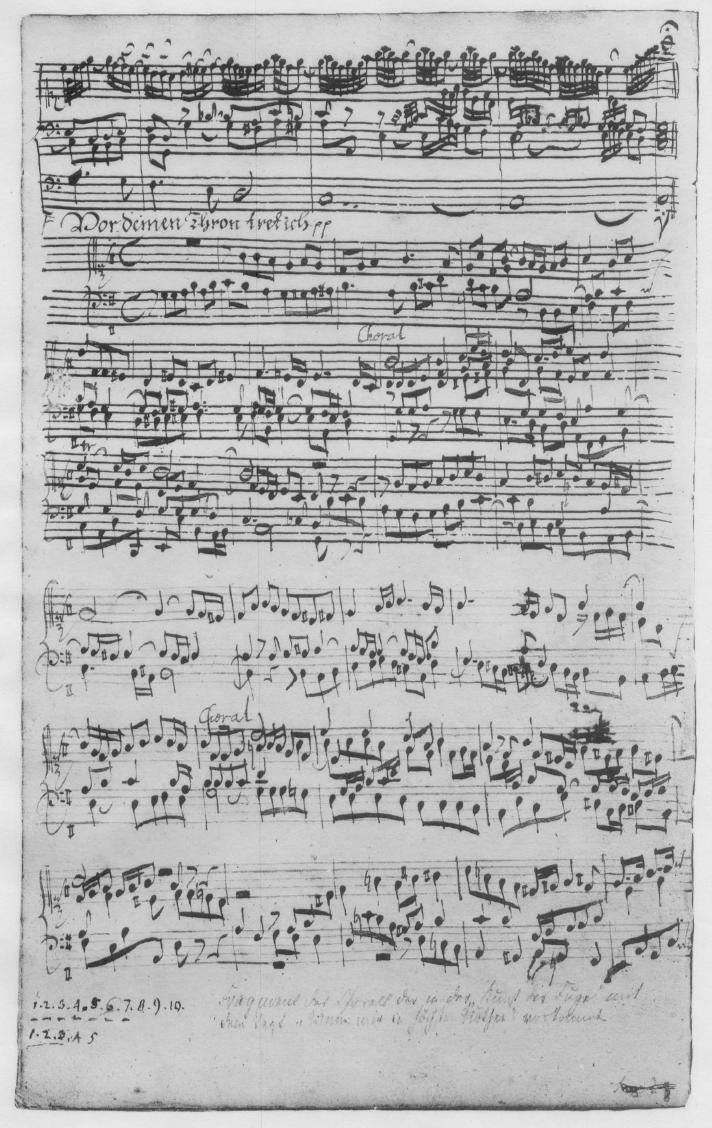
The single surviving page of the manuscript of "Vor deinen Thron tret ich", BWV 668, recorded by an unknown copyist in the last year of Bach's life.

The breadth of styles and forms represented by the Great Eighteen is as diverse as that of Bach's Well Tempered Clavier for the keyboard. The pieces are on a large and often epic scale, compared with the miniature intimacy of the choral preludes of the Orgelbüchlein. Many of the chorale preludes pay homage to much older models in the German liturgical tradition (Georg Böhm, Buxtehude and Pachelbel), but the parallel influence of the Italian concerto tradition is equally visible. It is a mid-eighteenth century salute to the musical traditions of the previous century. Unlike Part III of the Clavier-Übung, where Bach pushed his compositional techniques for the organ to new limits, the chorale settings of Bach's Great Eighteen represent "the very quintessence of all he elaborated in Weimar in this field of art;" they "transcend by their magnitude and depth all previous types of choral prelude"; and they display a "workmanship as nearly flawless as we have any right to expect of a human being." The eighteen are characterized by their freely developed and independent accompaniment filling the long intervals between the successive lines of the cantus firmus, a feature of their large scale which has not pleased all commentators.

=== Chorale motet ===
The Renaissance motet, in madrigal style, forms the model for the chorale motet, used in BWV 665 and 666. Each line of the chorale is established as a point of imitation for the different parts, which keep to a common rhythm. This style, the earliest used by Bach, was that employed in his Mühlhausen cantatas, such as the funeral cantata Actus Tragicus, BWV 106. A common distinctive feature is the use of musical figures to illustrate particular lines or even words in the hymn text.

=== Chorale partita ===
The chorale partita is a set of variations on a chorale melody. Normally each variation repeats the chorale melody and is essentially a separate movement. This style goes back to the Dutch composer Sweelinck and was adopted by his German pupils Scheidt and Scheidemann; the tradition was continued at the turn of the 18th century by Georg Böhm and Pachelbel from Thuringia, who provided the model for Bach. Bach, however, broke the norm in the two chorale preludes of this genre, BWV 656 and 667, which each have only a small number of variations (3 and 2). This might be a homage to Dieterich Buxtehude, who had written similar partitas and whose music and virtuosity at the organ is known to have exercised a considerable influence on Bach in his youth.

=== Ornamental chorale ===
In the ornamental chorale, a form invented and popularized in Northern Germany by Scheidemann, the chorale melody is taken by one voice in an elaborate and highly embellished form. Buxtehude was one of its most celebrated exponents, with his individual expressive "vocal" ornamentation.

Five chorale preludes of the Great Eighteen were written in this style: BWV 652, 653, 654, 659 and 662.

=== Cantus firmus chorale ===
The cantus firmus chorale: The melody of the chorale is sounded in long notes throughout the piece, was established and popularized in central Germany by Pachelbel. One of his students was Johann Christoph Bach III, Bach's older brother, who in turn taught Bach keyboard technique. There are six examples of the cantus firmus chorale: BWV 651, 657, 658, 661, 663 and 668.

=== Chorale trio ===
The chorale trio has the form of a trio sonata in which the upper parts are played on the two keyboards of the organ and the basso continuo part is played on the pedals. Bach elevated this form to the status of contemporary Italian trio sonatas or double concertos of Antonio Vivaldi and Giuseppe Torelli: it is probably his single most original innovation in the repertoire of organ chorales. The three virtuosic chorale preludes of this type are BWV 655, 660 and 664.

== Chorale Preludes BWV 651–668 ==
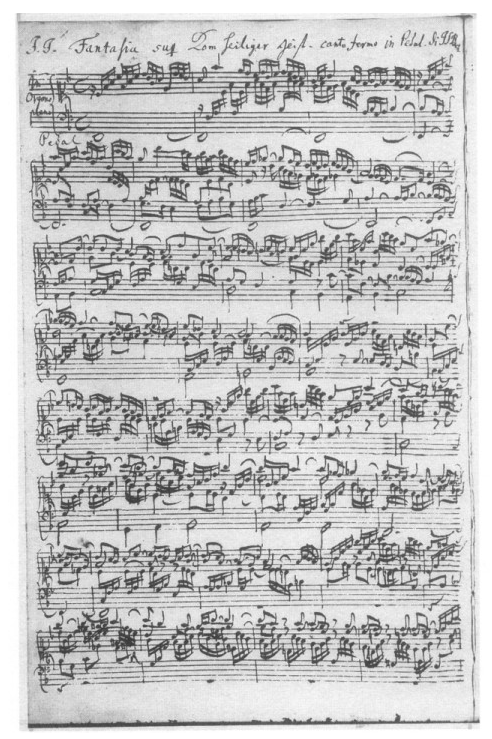
Autograph manuscript of BWV 651 with Bach's motto "J.J.", Jesu juva

The brief descriptions of the chorale preludes are based on the detailed analysis in Williams (1980) and Stinson (2001).
To listen to a MIDI recording, please click on the link.

- BWV 651 Fantasia super Komm, Heiliger Geist [Come, Holy Ghost], canto fermo in Pedale (cantus firmus chorale)

Over the pedal chorale melody sweeps an exuberant toccata, conveying the "rushing mighty wind" of the Holy Spirit; a second ornamented subject symbolises the Hallelujas at the culmination of the hymn.

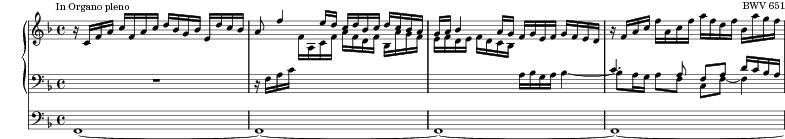

- BWV 652 Komm, Heiliger Geist [Come, Holy Ghost], alio modo a 2 Clav. e Pedale (ornamental chorale)

The ornate chorale melody sings out above a lyrical and calm three-part sarabande, with flowing semiquavers marking the Hallelujas of the coda, in this, the longest of the chorale preludes.

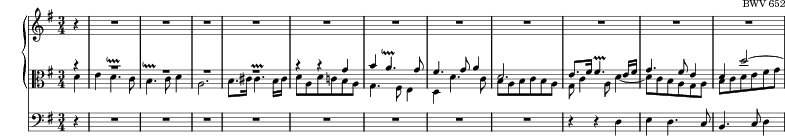

- BWV 653 An Wasserflüssen Babylon [By the waters of Babylon], a 2 Clav. e Pedale (ornamental chorale)

The hymn "An Wasserflüssen Babylon" is a paraphrase of Psalm 137, a lament in exile in Babylon. The gentle ritornellos of the accompanying parts in the two upper parts and pedal of this sarabande anticipate the ornamented chorale in the tenor, evoking the mournful tone of the hymn, the "organs and harps, hung up on willow trees", based on Psalm 137. In a famous concert in 1720 on the great organ in St Catherine's Church in Hamburg, Bach had improvised for almost half an hour on the same hymn tune as a tribute to the church's organist Johann Adam Reinken and his celebrated fantasy on the same theme. A derivation of the theme is used in the fugue from Bach's Violin Sonata No. 3 in C Major, BWV 1005.

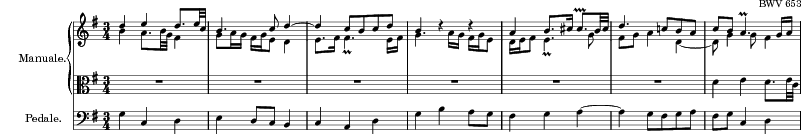

- BWV 654 Schmücke dich, o liebe Seele [Adorn yourself, dear soul], a 2 Clav. e Pedale (ornamental chorale)

The soberly ornamented, but melismatic, chorale, Schmücke dich, o liebe Seele, in the soprano alternates with the dance-like ritornellos of the two intertwining lower parts above a pedal bass; the unearthly counterpoint between the four parts creates an air of great serenity, a "rapturous meditation" on the rite of communion. The adornment in the title is illustrated by the French-style ornamentation of the upper parts.

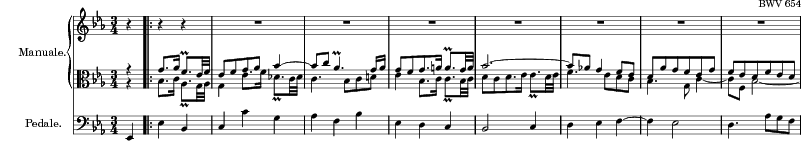

- BWV 655 Trio super Herr Jesu Christ, dich zu uns wend [Lord Jesu Christ, turn to us], a 2 Clav. e Pedale (chorale trio)

Similar in texture to movements from the organ trio sonatas, this jubilant and lively concerto-like chorale prelude echos the "eternal joy and blissful light" of the last verse. The chorale prelude's progression through the keys of G, D, E minor, B minor, D and finally G, is reminiscent of Vivaldi concertos. The two manual solo parts and pedal continuo are based on elements from the cantus firmus, which is heard in its entirety in the pedal part of the recapitulation.

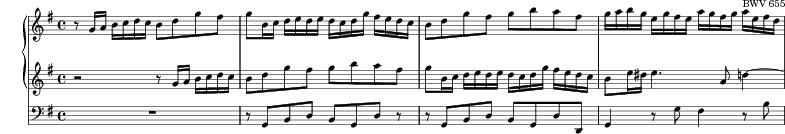

- BWV 656 O Lamm Gottes unschuldig [Oh innocent lamb of God], 3 Versus (chorale partita)

The first verse of this Good Friday hymn, is a subdued prelude in four parts based on the cantus firmus, which appears explicitly in the soprano line over the flowing quaver accompaniment; in the second verse the cantus firmus moves to the alto line and the quaver figures become more lively; in the final verse, the pedal finally appears to take up the cantus firmus, beneath a four-part fugal counter-subject in triplets, first in a forthright angular figuration, then in hammered repeated notes leading to an anguished chromatic passage, indicative of the crucifixion, and finally in peaceful flowing quavers.

- BWV 657 Nun danket Alle Gott [Now Thank We All Our God] (Leuthen Chorale), a 2 Clav. e Pedale, canto fermo in Soprano (cantus firmus chorale)

This chorale prelude closely follows the model of Pachelbel, with a diversity of imitative elements in the lower parts, beneath the unadorned cantus firmus of the soprano line.

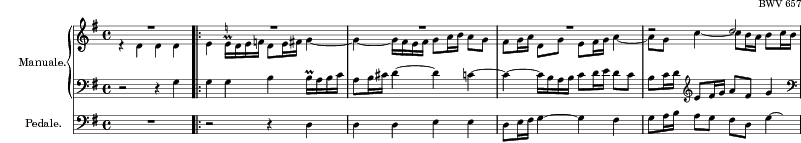

- BWV 658 Von Gott will ich nicht lassen [I will not forsake the Lord], Canto fermo in Pedale (cantus firmus chorale)

The ornate three-part keyboard accompaniment is derived from the opening notes of the hymn and a separate "joy motif" that permeates the piece, exquisitely "winding above and around [the chorale melody] like a luxurious garland of amaranth." Only four lines of the cantus firmus are heard in the tenor pedal, the chorale prelude closing with a seemingly timeless bell-like coda over a pedal point, perhaps illustrating the final lines of the hymn, "after death we will be buried deep in the earth; when we have slept, we will be awoken by God." In this "bell" coda, the note D♭5 is heard 7 times consecutively, within a fourth voice, outside of the three accompaniment voices. This is indicative of the German funeral bell.

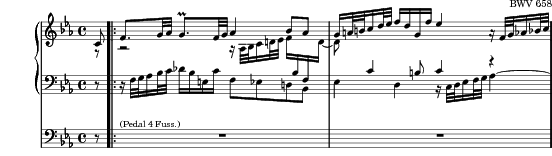

- BWV 659 played by The Melodica Drone & Bach Quartet
  BWV 659 Nun komm' der Heiden Heiland [Come now, Saviour of the heathen], a 2 Clav. e Pedale (ornamental chorale) in G minor

Over the quavers of the continuo-like "walking bass" in the pedal, the two inner parts move forward meditatively in canon, beneath the florid and melismatic cantus firmus of "Nun komm, der Heiden Heiland". The beautiful melody, endlessly prolonged and never fully perceptible amid the freely spiraling arabesques, evokes the mystery of the incarnation; it is matched by the perfection of the accompaniment.

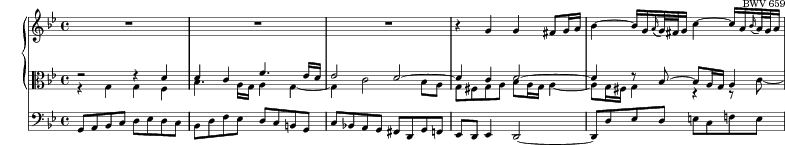

- BWV 660 Trio super Nun komm' der Heiden Heiland [Come now, Saviour of the heathen], a due Bassi e canto fermo (chorale trio)

This chorale prelude is unusually scored as a two-part invention for pedal and bass, with the ornamented cantus firmus in the soprano line following the original hymn melody fairly closely. The opening ritornello, played imitatively in canon, contains the notes of the cantus firmus—g, g, f♯, b♭, a, g, a, g— distributed between the two bass parts.

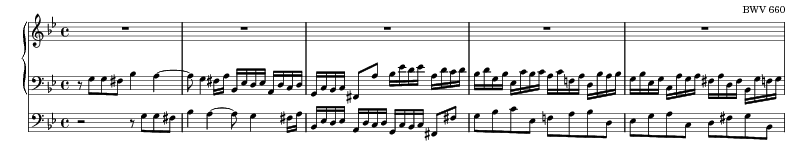

- BWV 661 Nun komm' der Heiden Heiland [Come now, Saviour of the heathen], in Organo Pleno, Canto fermo in Pedale (cantus firmus chorale)

Beneath a three-part keyboard fugue, typical of Bach's large scale free organ fugues, with an angular quaver theme derived from the melody, the cantus firmus is heard in the pedal; the fugal theme, its counter-subject and their inversions are combined in numerous ways in the course of the piece.

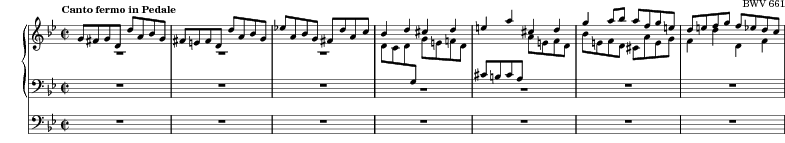

- BWV 662 Allein Gott in der Höh' sei Ehr [Alone to God on high be honour], a 2. Clav. e Pedale, Canto fermo in Soprano (ornamental chorale)

This chorale prelude, unusually marked adagio, is based on "Allein Gott in der Höh sei Ehr", a German version of the hymn Gloria in excelsis Deo. It has two ornate fugal inner parts over a continuo-like pedal, with a florid and melismatic cantus firmus in the soprano, its figurations reminiscent of those for obligato violin or oboe in the Weimar cantatas (e.g. the sinfonia of Ich hatte viel Bekümmernis, BWV 21).

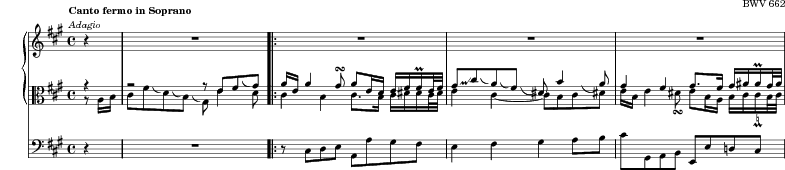

- BWV 663 Allein Gott in der Höh' sei Ehr [Alone to God on high be honour], a 2. Clav. e Pedale, Canto fermo in Tenore (cantus firmus chorale)

The accompanying ritornello of this chorale prelude takes the form of a trio sonata, the two fantasia-like upper parts, with their lively constantly varying contrapuntal quaver figurations, matched by a solid pedal continuo; the aria-like ornamented cantus firmus is heard in the long tenor part, with its quaver melismas and sighs.

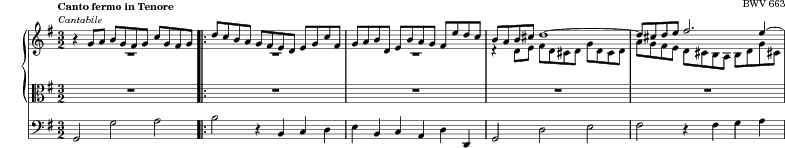

- BWV 664 Trio super Allein Gott in der Höh' sei Ehr [Alone to God on high be honour], a 2. Clav. e Pedale (chorale trio)

This is another chorale prelude similar to movements from the organ trio sonatas, inventive, scintillating, joyous and concerto-like; the two independent solo parts and the pedal continuo are based on elements from the cantus firmus, the first two phrases of which are only heard right at the end of the piece in the pedal before the final pedal point and coda. The chorale prelude is in three parts: six fugal statements of the ritornello; a series of brilliant violinistic episodes with suspensions, semiquavers and prolonged trills, punctuated twice by the ritornello in the minor mode; and a return of the ritornello over the cantus firmus ending in a long pedal point.

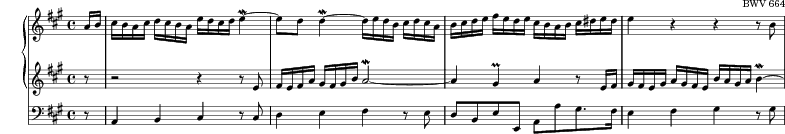

- BWV 665 Jesus Christus, unser Heiland [Jesus Christ, our Saviour], sub communione, Pedaliter (chorale motet)

In this choral prelude, each of the four lines of the cantus firmus passes through the four different voices, accompanied by a counter-subject giving the musical colour appropriate to that line: the carrying of the Cross; God's anger; Christ's bitter suffering; and resurrection from the torment of Hell, for which Bach provides the longest and most elaborate pedal point of the whole collection.

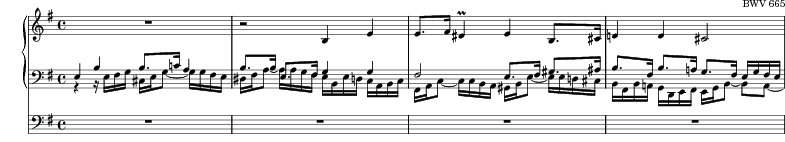

- BWV 666 Jesus Christus, unser Heiland [Jesus Christ, our Saviour], alio modo (chorale motet)

This short chorale prelude for keyboard alone is a simple form of the chorale motet, with the cantus firmus again passed between parts and a different counter-subject for each of the four lines of the hymn.

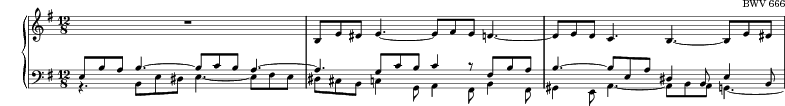

- BWV 667 Komm, Gott, Schöpfer, Heiliger Geist [Come, God, the Creator, Holy Ghost], in Organo pleno con Pedale obligato (chorale partita)

This chorale prelude on Martin Luther's hymn for Pentecost "Komm, Gott Schöpfer, Heiliger Geist" consists of two variations linked by a bridging interlude: the first is a miniature chorale prelude almost identical to BWV 631 in the Orgelbüchlein, with an uninterrupted cantus firmus in the soprano line; in the second, the four lines of the cantus firmus are heard in the pedal, beneath a flowing imitative ritornello accompaniment on the keyboard.

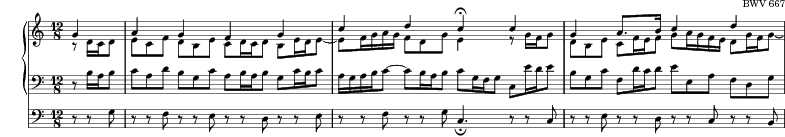

- BWV 668 Vor deinen Thron tret' ich hiermit [Before your throne I now appear] (fragment) (cantus firmus chorale)

The three-part imitative accompaniment in the pedal and lower keyboard of this chorale prelude is based on figures derived from the 4 different lines of the melody and their inversions; each line of the cantus firmus itself is heard in the simple soprano line, stripped of any embellishment, after its pre-imitation in the ritornello parts.

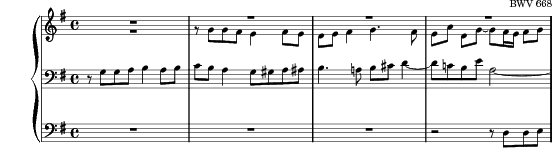

== Variants ==
The original chorale preludes composed in Weimar are numbered BWV 651a, 652a, etc. When there are two or three earlier versions, the numbering uses other letters of the alphabet, for example BWV 655a, 655b and 665c. The variant BWV 668a is the complete version of the chorale prelude that was published as an appendix to the Art of the Fugue, possibly to compensate for the unfinished final fugue, Contrapunctus XIV.

== Publication ==
The Great Eighteen were known throughout Germany by the turn of the nineteenth century, but only the last chorale prelude was available in print, in several editions, thanks to its reputation as the "deathbed chorale". Prior to the two Leipzig editions of Felix Mendelssohn in 1846 (which omitted BWV 664, 665, 666 and 668) and of Griepenkerl and Roitzsch in 1847 (which was complete), the only other published chorale prelude of the Great Eighteen was the brilliant trio Allein Gott BWV 664, which appeared in 1803 as one of the 38 chorale preludes in J. G. Schicht's four-volume anthology. The two chorale preludes Nun komm' der heiden Heiland, BWV 659, and Schmücke dich, o liebe Seele, BWV 654, had nevertheless become favourites. Mendelssohn and Schumann both venerated Schmücke dich: Schumann recalled Mendelssohn confessing after one performance that, "If life were to deprive me of hope and faith, this single chorale would replenish me with them both." Following Mendelssohn's popularization of these works, the definitive Bach-Gesellschaft edition, edited by Wilhelm Rust, was published in Leipzig in 1875.

== Transcriptions ==
| Arranger and instrumentation | Published title | Original chorale prelude and BWV number |
|---|---|---|
| Carl Tausig (piano) | Choralvorspiele für die Orgel von Johann Sebastian Bach: Für das Clavier übertragen von Carl Tausig. Berlin (dedicated to Brahms) | O Lammes Gottes unschuldig, BWV 656 |
| Ferruccio Busoni (piano) | Orgelchoralvorspiele von Johann Sebastian Bach: Auf das Pianoforte im Kammerstyl übertragen von Ferruccio Benvenuto Busoni, Leipzig, 1898 (dedicated to José Vianna da Motta) | Nun komm, der Heiden Heiland, BWV 659; Jesus Christus, unser Heiland, BWV 665; Komm, Gott Schöpfer, Heiliger Geist, BWV 667 |
| Max Reger (piano) | Ausgewählte Choralvorspiele von Joh. Seb. Bach: Für Klavier zu 2 Händen übertragen von Max Reger, Vienna, 1900 | Komm Heiliger Geist, Herre Gott, BWV 651; An Wasserflüssen Babylon, BWV 653b; Schmücke dich, o liebe Seele, BWV 654; Nun danket alle Gott, BWV 657; Vor deinen Thron tret ich hiermit, BWV 668 |
| Arnold Schoenberg (orchestra) | Choralvorspiele von Joh. Seb. Bach instrumentiert von Arnold Schoenberg, Vienna, 1925 | Schmücke dich, o liebe Seele, BWV 654; Komm, Gott Schöpfer, Heiliger Geist, BWV 667 |
| Wilhelm Kempff (piano) | Musik des Barock und Rokoko, für Klavier übertragen von Wilhelm Kempff, Berlin, 1932 | Nun komm' der Heiden Heiland, BWV 659 |
| Leopold Stokowski (orchestra) | unpublished, first performed on April 7, 1934 | Nun komm' der Heiden Heiland, BWV 659 |
| Ralph Vaughan Williams (cello and strings) | unpublished; first performed in London on December 28, 1956, in honour of the 80th birthday of Pablo Casals | Schmücke dich, o liebe Seele, BWV 654 |

== Selected recordings ==
- Michel Chapuis, in Bach – The Complete Organ Works (1966–1970)
- Bernard Foccroulle, Leipzig Chorales, Ricercar, RIC212 (2 discs). Recorded in 2002 on the large Silbermann organ in Freiberg Cathedral, Germany, dating from 1714. The recording also includes the Preludes and Fugues BWV 546 and 547, and the Canonic Variations on "Vom Himmel hoch", BWV 769a.
- André Isoir, L'Oeuvre pour Orgue (15 discs), Calliope, CAL 3703–3717 (budget edition 2008). The chorale preludes, recorded in 1990 on the G. Westenfelder organ in Fère-en-Tardenois, are contained on the last 2 discs, which are available separately.
- Ton Koopman, Schübler and Leipzig Chorales, Teldec, 1999 (2 discs). Recorded on the Christian Müller organ in Leeuwarden, interspersed with a cappella versions of the chorales sung by the Amsterdam Baroque Choir.
- Simon Preston, in J.S. Bach: The Organ Works · Das Orgelwerk, Deutsche Grammophon. Recorded on the Metzler Organ of Trinity College, Cambridge in December 1999.

== See also ==
- List of compositions by Johann Sebastian Bach
