= Sigfrid Karg-Elert =

German composer

Karg-Elert, ca. 1913

Sigfrid Theodor Karg-Elert (né Karg; 21 November 1877 – 9 April 1933) was a German composer and organist who wrote prolifically for pipe and reed organs.

== Biography ==
Karg-Elert was born Siegfried Theodor Karg in Oberndorf am Neckar, Germany, the youngest of the twelve children of Johann Jacob Karg, a book dealer, and his wife Marie Auguste Karg, born Ehlert (sic). According to another account, however, his father was a newspaper editor and publisher. The family finally settled in Leipzig in 1882, where Siegfried received his first musical training and private piano instruction. At a gathering of composers in Leipzig, he presented his first attempts at composition to the composer Emil von Reznicek, who arranged a three-year tuition-free scholarship at the Leipzig Conservatory. This enabled the young man to study with Salomon Jadassohn, Carl Reinecke, Alfred Reisenauer and Robert Teichmüller.

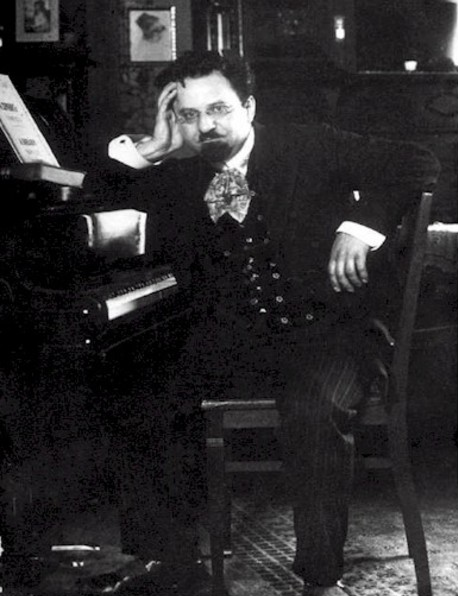
Karg-Elert in his study

From August 1901 to September 1902 he worked as a piano teacher in Magdeburg. It was during this period that he changed his name to Sigfrid Karg-Elert, adding a variant of his mother's maiden name to his surname, and adopting the Swedish spelling of his first name.

Having returned to Leipzig, he started devoting himself to composition, primarily for the piano (encouraged by Edvard Grieg, whom he greatly admired); and in 1904 he met the Berlin publisher Carl Simon, who introduced him to the harmonium. From then on until his death he created one of the most significant and extensive catalogs of original works for this instrument. Encouraged by the organist Paul Homeyer, he reworked several of these harmonium compositions for organ, before composing his first original organ work, the 66 Chorale Improvisations, Op. 65 in 1909.

In 1910, Karg-Elert married Luise Kretzschmar (1890–1971); four years later their daughter Katharina was born.

After having served as a regimental oboist during World War I, Karg-Elert was appointed instructor of music theory and composition at the Leipzig Conservatory in 1919. One of his pupils was composer Gonzalo Brenes.

From 1924, Karg-Elert gave weekly harmonium recitals on the radio from his home, through which he performed his second sonata for harmonium as part of his 50th birthday celebrations in 1927.

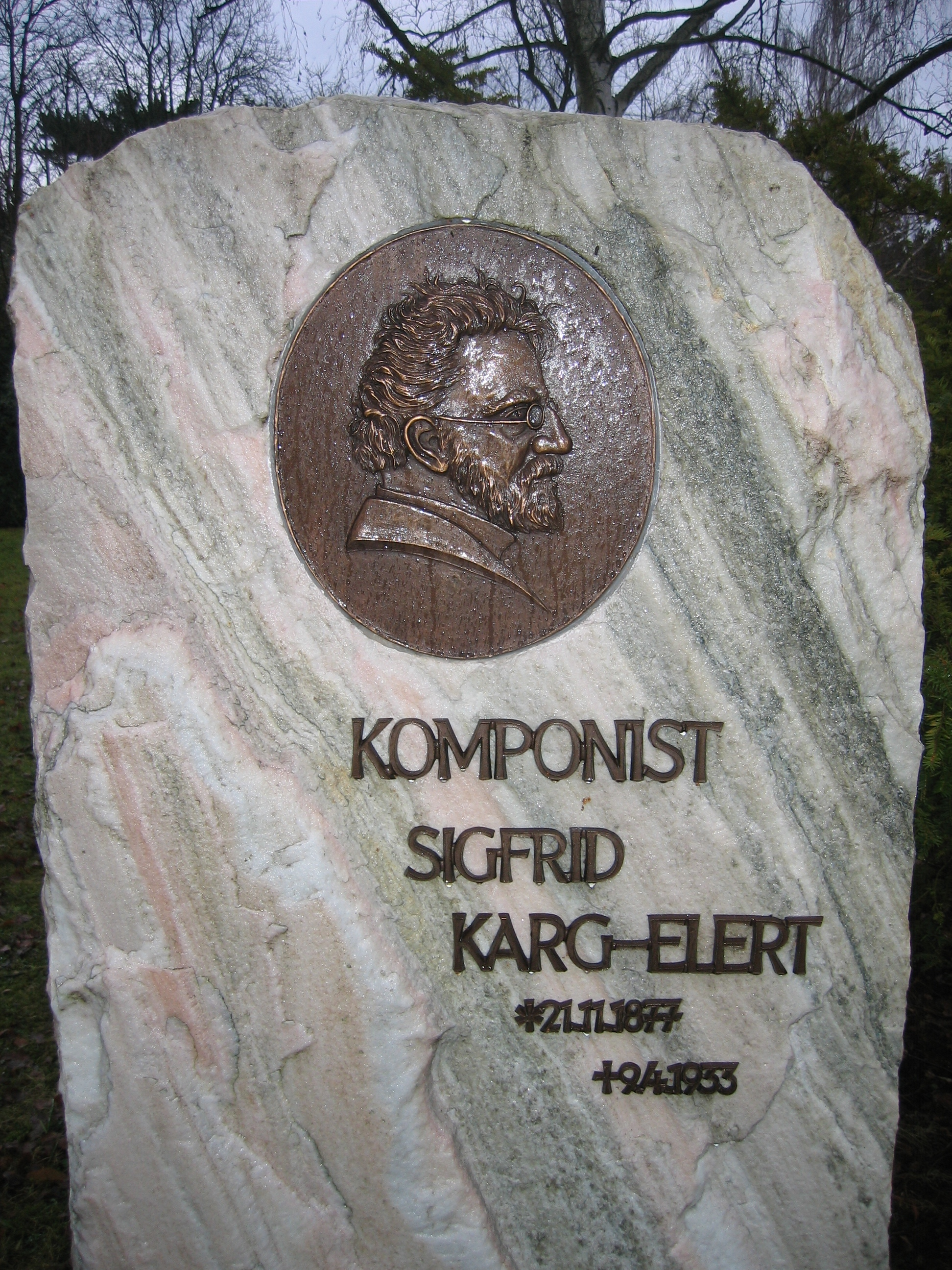
Karg-Elert's grave

The cultural climate in Germany in the 1920s and 1930s was very hostile to the internationally oriented, French-influenced Karg-Elert; and although his works were admired outside Germany, especially in the U.K. (the Organ Music Society of London held a twelve-day festival in his honour in 1930, which he attended) and in the United States, in his home country his music was almost completely neglected. All this led to him accepting an invitation for an organ concert tour of America in the spring of 1932. The tour proved to be a disastrous mistake, musically, due to heavy smoking, neuralgia and heart failure. Moreover, he was suffering from the diabetes which would soon kill him, and his limited powers as an organist compared unfavourably to the virtuoso standard of organ performance (set by the likes of Marcel Dupré and Louis Vierne) to which American audiences had grown accustomed. For many years it was thought that Karg-Elert was offered the position of organ chair at the Carnegie Institute in Pittsburgh, which he was forced to decline due to his failing health; however there is no evidence for this statement.

After his return to Leipzig, his health started deteriorating rapidly. He died there in April 1933, aged 55. His grave is in the Südfriedhof in Leipzig. The popularity of his compositions declined for a period after World War II, before a successful revival in the late 1970s; today his works for the organ are frequently included in recitals.

== Music ==
Karg-Elert regarded himself as an outsider. Notable influences in his work include composers Johann Sebastian Bach (he often used the BACH motif in Bach's honour), Edvard Grieg, Claude Debussy, Max Reger, Alexander Scriabin, and early Arnold Schoenberg. In general terms, his musical style can be characterised as being late-romantic with impressionistic and expressionistic tendencies. His profound knowledge of music theory allowed him to stretch the limits of traditional harmony without losing tonal coherence.

His favourite instruments for composition were the Kunstharmonium and the pipe organ. He also composed for small ensembles or the piano, including vocal music. His music for flute became very popular during his lifetime. He also took a considerable interest in the saxophone.

== Notable works ==
- 66 Chorale improvisations for organ (including no 59 "Nun danket alle Gott"), Op. 65
- Passacaglia in E♭ minor for harmonium or organ
- Cathedral Windows for organ
- Symphony in F♯ minor, Op. 143 for organ (orchestral version by Franklin Stöver)
- 33 Stylistic Studies for harmonium
- Jugend for clarinet, flute, horn, and piano
- 30 Caprices for flute solo
- Sonata for clarinet solo
- 20 Chorale Preludes and Postludes for organ
- 25 Caprices and an Atonal Sonata for saxophone
- Sketch Book, Op. 102 (for organ)

The 30 Caprices for flute were written specifically for a friend of Karg-Elert's, a flautist bound for service in the war. These short exercises were designed to challenge linear one-staff thinking and in short, keep the friend from becoming bored. They are now a standard set of technical, dynamic, and phrasing exercises for young flute students all over the world.

Caprices for Flute, Op. 107, No. 1: Tempo giusto

Caprices for Flute, Op. 107, No. 2

Caprices for Flute, Op. 107, No. 3: Allegro alla Handel

Sonata in B♭ major - Op.121
Performed by Felix Skowronek, flute and Anita Cummings, piano

== Books ==
Karg-Elert published, in addition to articles in Die Musik-Woche, a number of books and papers, latterly including:

- 'Die Grundlagen der Musiktheorie'. (tr. "The basics of music theory ") Leipzig (1920/1921).
- 'Orgel und Harmonium. Eine Skizze'. In: Musik-Taschenbuch für den täglichen Gebrauch (Edition Steingräber Nr. 60), Leipzig o. J. (ca. 1920/1925), Pp. 275–301.
- 'Wie ich zum Harmonium kam'. In: Der Harmoniumfreund. I/1 (1927), P. 4f.
- 'Konservatorium und Musikerziehung'. In: Deutsche Tonkünstler-Zeitung. 27/5 (1929), Pp. 433–436.
- 'Akustische Ton-, Klang- und Funktionsbestimmung'. (tr. "Acoustic tone, tone and function determination"), Leipzig (1930).
- 'Polaristische Klang- und Tonalitätslehre (Harmonologik)' (tr. "The logic of harmony"), Leipzig: Leuckart, 1930.
