= Klaus Wallrath =

German church musician and composer

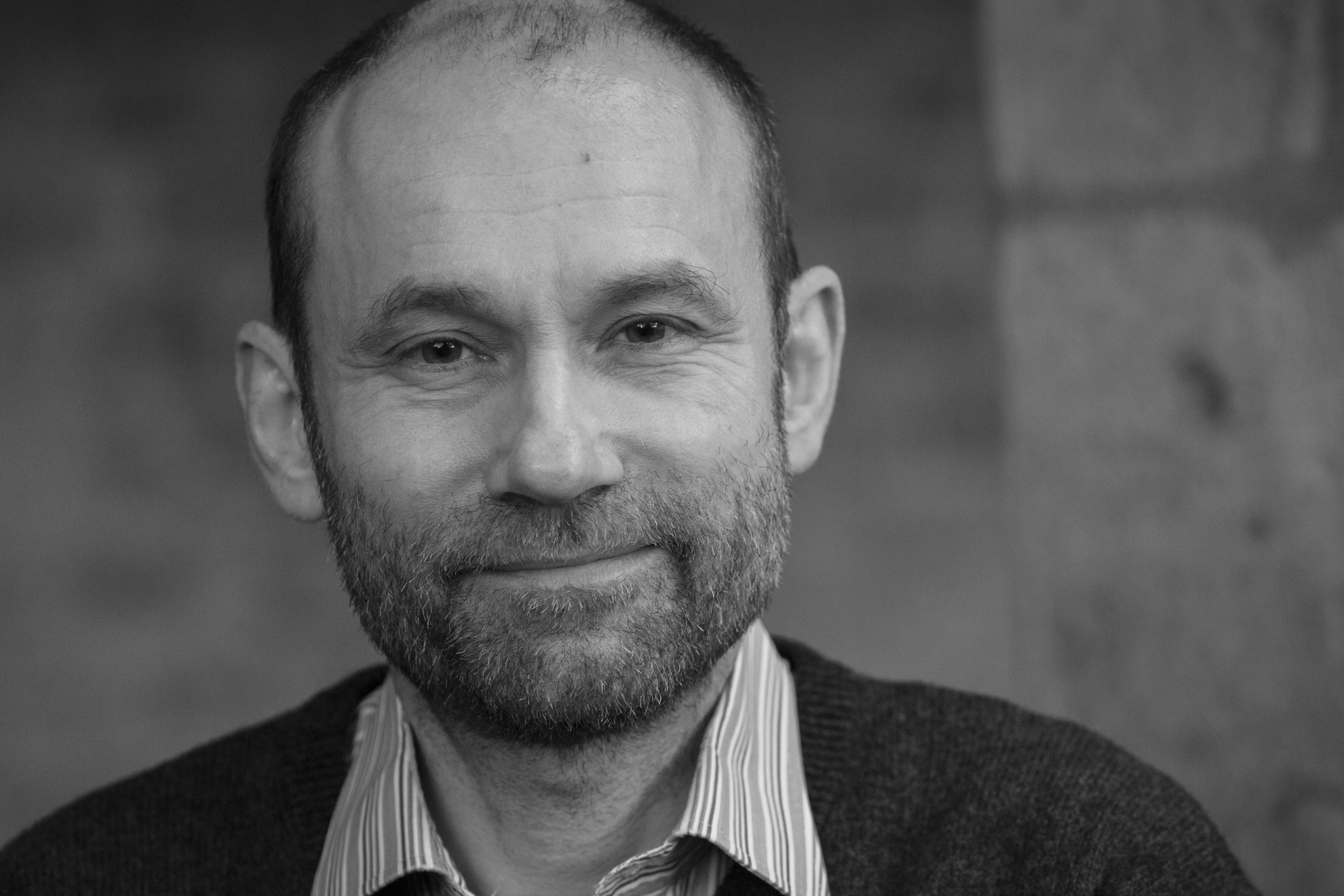
- Klaus Wallrath in 2018
- Born: 13 May 1959 (age 66); Korschenbroich, Germany
- Occupations: Church musician; Composer; Academic teacher
- Organizations: Basilika St. Margareta; Folkwang University of the Arts
- Title: Musikdirektor ACV

Klaus Wallrath (born 13 May 1959) is a German church musician and composer. He has been responsible for church music at the Basilika St. Margareta in Düsseldorf-Gerresheim from 1987. He has composed especially song motets (Liedmotetten) on Christian hymns, and musicals on Biblical themes for children's choirs. Compositions have been commissioned for Cologne Cathedral and the Katholikentag.

== Life ==
Born in Korschenbroich, near Mönchengladbach, as a schoolboy Wallrath was given piano and organ lessons by Franzjosef Franzen (1927–1997). After his Abitur at the Humanistisches Gymnasium, Mönchengladbach, Wallrath studied church music at the Robert Schumann Hochschule Düsseldorf from 1977 to 1982: he was trained in Catholic church music and choral conducting by Heinz Odenthal, and conducting by Hans Kast. He graduated with the post of Kantor. He went on to study piano with Leonore Auerswald, achieving a performing certificate in 1985.

During his studies he worked as a chamber musician, and belonged to the Gesualdo Ensemble from 1986. In 1987, he was appointed as church musician at Basilika St. Margareta, which from 1995 was enlarged to a parish containing seven other churches. He has worked for many projects of the Diocese of Cologne. Wallrath founded several choirs and ensembles, notably the Basilika Chor – a choir school for children and young adults, with more than 150 students – and the chamber choir Kammerchor St. Margareta. He has been instrumental in initiating concert series like the Gerresheimer Orgeltage for organ, oratorio performances and Stiftssaalkonzerte for chamber music. His repertoire includes Gregorian chant, classical music, contemporary music, and jazz.

As a pianist, Wallrath has regularly performed in chamber groups, including Ensemble quatuor and Ensemble cinquepiù. In addition, he taught choral conducting at the Folkwang University of the Arts, Essen from 2008 to 2014.

In 2014, Wallrath became the third person to be awarded the honorary title of Musikdirektor ACV by the Allgemeiner Cäcilien-Verband für Deutschland (ACV). The commendation recognized his enthusiasm as a church musician, inspiring others and proclaiming his faith through music.

In 2018, he composed a mass for peace, Missa da pacem, commissioned by Münster Cathedral for the final service of the Katholikentag in Münster in keeping with the motto of the event "Suche Frieden" (Seek peace). The music was performed for an audience of around 30,000 on 13 May 2018 by the cathedral's choirs (Dommusik) and an orchestra. It is based on the Gregorian Chant Da pacem Domine. Tanztheater Münster, the ballet company of Theater Münster, interpreted the movements Kyrie and Agnus Dei, and the congregation was requested to participate singing in movements Gloria and Sanctus.

== Works ==
Wallrath has composed mostly sacred vocal music, including masses, cantatas and motets. His specialties are Liedmotetten, setting mostly contemporary hymns for choir and accompaniment, and musicals for children as performers and listeners.

=== Masses ===
- Friedrich-Spee-Messe (2011), including texts by Friedrich Spee, for soprano, baritone, children's choir, mixed choir and large orchestra, on a scholarship by Düsseldorf
- Franziskusmesse "Gott im Anderen begegnen"“ (2013)
- Missa festiva (2015) for soprano, mixed choir, ten brass instruments, timpani and organ
- Missa in F (2017) for mixed choir and organ or brass ad timpani
- Missa brevis (2018) for mixed choir and organ or orchestra
- Missa da pacem (2018) for mixed choir and orchestra for the concluding service of the 101st Katholikentag in Münster

=== Liedmotetten ===
- Von guten Mächten (2008), on "Von guten Mächten", for mixed choir, congregation and organ
- Eine große Stadt ersteht (2008), on "Eine große Stadt ersteht", for mixed choir, congregation, brass or organ
- O Heiland, reiß die Himmel auf (2009), on "Von guten Mächten", for mixed choir, congregation and organ
- Gott liebt diese Welt (2014), for mixed choir, organ and brass
- Wenn das Brot, das wir teilen (2016), on "Wenn das Brot, das wir teilen", for mixed choir, congregation and organ, for the concluding service of the 100th Katholikentag in Leipzig
- Nimm, o Gott, die Gaben, die wir bringen (2016), on "Nimm, o Gott, die Gaben, die wir bringen", for mixed choir, congregation and organ
- Strahlen brechen viele aus einem Licht (2016), for mixed choir, congregation, organ and brass, for the Pueri-Cantores association
- Herr, du bist mein Leben (2018), on "Herr, du bist mein Leben", for mixed choir, congregation, organ and brass, for Pueri Cantores
- Ich sing dir mein Lied (2020), for mixed choir, children's choir and piano, or organ, or brass, for Stephanie Borkenfeld-Müllers and the choir of St. Laurentius, Odenkirchen
- Es führt drei König Gottes Hand (2020), for mixed choir and organ, for the Cologne Cathedral choirs

=== Children's musicals ===
- Zwischen Linsengericht und Himmelsleiter (2013), children's musical for children's choir and ensemble, text: Ronald Klein, music: Max and Klaus Wallrath
- Bartimäus geht ein Licht auf (2014), short musical for children's choir, instruments, text: Ronald Klein
- Kein Platz im Wunderteich? – Bethesda wird zum Ort der Gnade (2015), short musical for children's choir and instruments, text: Ronald Klein, commissioned by St. Severin, Cologne
- Elias - Jahwe ist mein Gott (2016), musical for children's choir, instruments, text: Ronald Klein, music: Max and Klaus Wallrath
- Ein Kind für die Welt (2019), nativity play for children's choir, flute, violin and piano, text: Florian Simson
- Josef und seine Brüder (2020), musical for children's choir, instruments, text: Florian Simson, music: Max and Klaus Wallrath
