= Gotteslob =

Common German-language Catholic hymnal

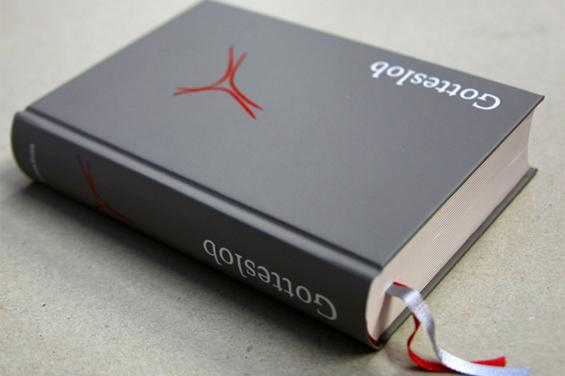
- Gotteslob, 2013
- Language: German
- Genre: Hymnal
- Published: 2013
- Publisher: Catholic dioceses
- Preceded by: Gotteslob, 1975

Gotteslob ("Praise of God") is the title of the hymnbook authorized by the Catholic dioceses in Germany, Austria, South Tyrol, Luxembourg and Liège, Belgium. First published in Advent 2013, it is the official hymnal for German-speaking Catholics, succeeding the first common German hymnal, the 1975 edition of the same name. Each diocese published a book containing a common section and a regional section. The first editions amounted to around 4 million copies.

== History ==
Gotteslob was developed as a sequel of the first common German hymnal, Gotteslob of 1975. It was developed over a period of 10 years by around 100 experts, who studied the use of hymns, conducting surveys and running tests in selected congregations. Gotteslob was published by Catholic dioceses in Germany, Austria, South Tyrol, and is also used by German-speaking parishes in Luxembourg and the Diocese of Liège, Belgium. It was introduced from Advent 2013, beginning on 1 December. It is intended to serve as a hymnal for church services as well as for private use. The first editions were around 4 million copies.

Each diocese published a book containing a common section called Stammteil, and a regional section with hymns for the specific diocese. The common section includes a list of songs.

=== Changes in 2013 ===
Some songs were composed for the 2013 edition, including the melody for "Heilig, heilig, heilig Gott" by Oliver Sperling. Some songs were moved from regional sections to the common section, including Christoph Bernhard Verspoell's Christmas carol "Menschen, die ihr wart verloren". Some songs were added, including Tersteegen's "Gott ist gegenwärtig", the penitential "Zeige uns, Herr, deine Allmacht und Güte", written in 1982 by Raymund Weber to an older melody, the midsummer hymn "Das Jahr steht auf der Höhe", and "Herr, du bist mein Leben" (Lord, You are my life), a translation of a popular Italian 1977 "Symbolum" by Pierangelo Sequeri.

=== Hymns ===
Hymns include "Den Herren will ich loben" and others by Maria Luise Thurmair. "Ein Haus voll Glorie schauet" is a popular hymn for consecration of a church and its anniversaries; however, the version of "Ein Haus voll Glorie schauet" in Gotteslob is a modern song written for the 1975 edition of Gotteslob that differs dramatically from the traditional hymn by the same name from 1875.

Among the regional hymns are the Easter hymn "Das Grab ist leer, der Held erwacht", the Trinity hymn "Gott Vater, sei gepriesen" and the Marian hymn "Nun, Brüder, sind wir frohgemut".

=== Reception ===
Gotteslob was critically received as a book by too few experts, with too little input from the practicing congregations.

=== List of hymns ===
This list is structured by the themes in the hymnal. The first column has the song's number in the hymnal, with an added letter ö for ökumenisch, meaning songs sung ecumenically, especially those also contained in the common Protestant hymnal Evangelisches Gesangbuch. The second column has the title, the third the origin of the text, the fourth the origin of the melody, the fifth notes such as for which occasion a song is useful.

No.	Title	Text	Melody	Notes
81–103	Morgen − Mittag − Abend (times of the day)			
81 ö	Lobet den Herren alle, die ihn ehren	Gerhardt	Crüger	Morning
84 ö	Morgenglanz der Ewigkeit	Rosenroth; Maria Luise Thurmair (2–4)	Ahle	Morning
88,1	Segne, Vater, diese Gaben	unknown	unknown	prayer before a meal, round
88,2	Dank dir, Vater, für die Gaben (Kanon)	unknown	unknown	prayer before a meal, same melody as 88,1
93 ö	Der Mond ist aufgegangen	Claudius	Schulz	Evening
101 ö	Nun ruhen alle Wälder	Gerhardt	Isaac	Evening, after "Innsbruck, ich muss dich lassen"
103	Dieser Tag ist Christus eigen	Gerloff	König	Sunday, morning
104–125	Heilige Messe (Mass ordinary)			
140 ö	Kommt herbei, singt dem Herrn	Zils	from Israel	Introit
142 ö	Zu dir, o Gott, erheben wir	Bone	Ulenberg	Introit, after Psalm 25
144 ö	Nun jauchzt dem Herren, alle Welt	Denicke		Introit, after Psalm 100
145	Wohin soll ich mich wenden	Neumann	Schubert (1827)	Introit
146	Du rufst uns, Herr, an deinen Tisch	Jourdan	Lehmann	
147 ö	Herr Jesu Christ, dich zu uns wend			Introit
149 ö	Liebster Jesu, wir sind hier	Clausnitzer	Ahle	Introit
167	Dir Gott im Himmel Preis und Ehr	Decius		Gloria
169	Gloria, Ehre sei Gott	Stimmer-Salzeder	Stimmer-Salzeder	Gloria
170 ö	Allein Gott in der Höh sei Ehr	Decius		Gloria
184	Herr, wir bringen in Brot und Wein	Meyer	Janssens	Offertory
186	Was uns die Erde Gutes spendet	Dörr	Franc	Offertory
187	Wir weihn der Erde Gaben	Steiner	Töpler	Offertory
188	Nimm, o Gott, die Gaben, die wir bringen	Weber	Webber	Offertory ("The Last Supper" from Jesus Christ Superstar)
203 ö	O Lamm Gottes, unschuldig			Agnus Dei
204 ö	Christe, du Lamm Gottes		(Graz 1602)	Agnus Dei
210	Das Weizenkorn muss sterben	Zenetti	Lauermann	Communion
215 ö	Gott sei gelobet und gebenedeiet			Communion
216 ö	Im Frieden dein, o Herre mein	Spitta	Dachstein	Communion
218–234	Advent			
218 ö	Macht hoch die Tür	Weissel		
220 ö	Die Nacht ist vorgedrungen	Klepper	Petzold	
221	Kündet allen in der Not	Dörr	Ahle	
223 ö	Wir sagen euch an den lieben Advent	Ferschl	Rohr	
224 ö	Maria durch ein Dornwald ging	Haxthausen		
228 ö	Tochter Zion, freue dich	Ranke	Handel	
231 ö	O Heiland, reiß die Himmel auf	Spee		
236–264	Weihnachtszeit (Christmastide)			
236 ö	Es kommt ein Schiff, geladen	Sudermann		
237 ö	Vom Himmel hoch, da komm ich her	Luther	Luther	
238 ö	O du fröhliche			
241 ö	Nun freut euch, ihr Christen	Mohr	1873	after Adeste fideles
243 ö	Es ist ein Ros entsprungen		Praetorius	
245	Menschen, die ihr wart verloren			
247	Lobt Gott, ihr Christen alle gleich			
248 ö	Ihr Kinderlein, kommet			
249 ö	Stille Nacht, heilige Nacht			
250 ö	Engel auf den Feldern singen	Maria Luise Thurmair	Angels We Have Heard on High	
251 ö	Jauchzet, ihr Himmel			
252 ö	Gelobet seist du, Jesu Christ			Grates nunc omnes
253 ö	In dulci jubilo			
256 ö	Ich steh an deiner Krippe hier			
258 ö	Lobpreiset all zu dieser Zeit			End of Year
261 ö	Stern über Betlehem			Epiphany
262	Seht ihr unsern Stern dort stehen	Zils	Angels We Have Heard on High	Epiphany
266–310	Österliche Bußzeit, Passion (Lent, Penitence, Passion)			
266	Bekehre uns, vergib die Sünde	Seuffert		
267 ö	O Mensch, bewein dein Sünde groß			
272	Zeige uns, Herr, deine Allmacht und Güte	Weber		
275	Selig, wem Christus auf dem Weg begegnet	Schellenberger		
277 ö	Aus tiefer Not schrei ich zu dir	Luther		Penitence, after Psalm 130
282 ö	Beim letzten Abendmahle			Maundy Thursday
289 ö	O Haupt voll Blut und Wunden	Gerhardt		Passion
290 ö	Herzliebster Jesu, was hast du verbrochen			Passion
295 ö	O Traurigkeit, o Herzeleid			Passion
297 ö	Wir danken dir, Herr Jesu Christ	Fischer	Herman	
312–340	Osterzeit (Eastertide)			
318 ö	Christ ist erstanden			
323	Du hast mein Klagen in Tanzen verwandelt	Psalm 30	Falk, Johannes	
325	Bleibe bei uns, du Wandrer durch die Zeit	Gerloff	Monk	Easter
328 ö	Gelobt sei Gott im höchsten Thron			
329	Das ist der Tag, den Gott gemacht			
331	Ist das der Leib, Herr Jesu Christ	Spee		
337	Freu dich, erlöste Christenheit			
341–355	Pfingsten, Dreifaltigkeit (Pentecost, Trinity)			
341	Veni creator spiritus			
342	Komm, Heilger Geist, der Leben schafft			
343	Veni Sancte Spiritus			
346	Atme in uns, Heiliger Geist		Mugnier	
347	Der Geist des Herrn erfüllt das All		Vulpius	
348 ö	Nun bitten wir den Heiligen Geist			
351	Komm, Schöpfer Geist, kehr bei uns ein			
357–378	Jesus Christus			
357 ö	Wie schön leuchtet der Morgenstern			
358 ö	Ich will dich lieben, meine Stärke	Silesius	Joseph	
360	Macht weit die Pforten in der Welt			
363	Herr, nimm auch uns zum Tabor mit	Gerloff	Mailänder	Transfiguration
364 ö	Schönster Herr Jesu			
365 ö	Meine Hoffnung und meine Freude	Berthier	Berthier	Taizé
372 ö	Morgenstern der finstern Nacht	Silesius	Joseph	
375 ö	Gelobt seist du, Herr Jesu Christ		Wöss	Christ the King
378	Brot, das die Hoffnung nährt	Willms	Janssens	NGL
379–413	Lob, Dank und Anbetung (praise, thanks and adoration)			
380 ö	Großer Gott, wir loben dich			
381 ö	Dein Lob, Herr, ruft der Himmel aus	Curtz		
382	Ein Danklied sei dem Herrn	Dreves	Wöss	song of thanks
383 ö	Ich lobe meinen Gott, der aus der Tiefe mich holt		Lehmann	Gloria
384	Hoch sei gepriesen unser Gott	Thurmair	Franc	paraphrase of Benedictus
385 ö	Nun saget Dank und lobt den Herren		Franc	after Psalm 118
387 ö	Gott ist gegenwärtig	Tersteegen	Neander	
388	Heilig, heilig, heilig		Schubert	Sanctus
389	Dass du mich einstimmen lässt in deinen Jubel, o Herr	Jesus-Bruderschaft		NGL
392 ö	Lobe den Herren, den mächtigen König der Ehren			
393 ö	Nun lobet Gott im hohen Thron			Praise, based on Psalm 117
396 ö	Lobt froh den Herrn	Gessner	Nägeli	
400 (ö)	Ich lobe meinen Gott von ganzem Herzen		Fraysse	Psalm 9, NGL
403 ö	Nun danket all und bringet Ehr			
405 ö	Nun danket alle Gott			
406 ö	Danket, danket dem Herrn	unknown	18th century	Thanks (Psalm 107:1), round
408 ö	Lobet und preiset, ihr Völker, den Herrn			Praise, based on psalms
409 ö	Singt dem Herrn ein neues Lied			
411	Erde, singe	Geissel		
413	Ehre, Ehre sei Gott in der Höhe			Gloria
414–435	Vertrauen und Trost (trust and solace)			
414	Herr, unser Herr, wie bist du zugegen	Oosterhuis		
416 ö	Was Gott tut, das ist wohlgetan	Gastorius		
418 ö	Befiehl du deine Wege			after Hos 37:5
421	Mein Hirt ist Gott der Herr			after Psalm 23
422 ö	Ich steh vor dir mit leeren Händen, Herr	Oosterhuis	Huijbers	
423 ö	Wer unterm Schutz des Höchsten steht			after Psalm 91
424 ö	Wer nur den lieben Gott lässt walten			
425 ö	Solang es Menschen gibt auf Erden	Oosterhuis	Marez Oyens-Wansink	
427 ö	Herr, deine Güt ist unbegrenzt			
428 ö	Herr, dir ist nichts verborgen	Maria Luise Thurmair		after Psalm 139
429 ö	Gott wohnt in einem Lichte	Klepper		
430 ö	Von guten Mächten treu und still umgeben	Bonhoeffer	Grahl	
436–441	Bitte und Klage (prayer and lament)			
436 ö	Ach bleib mit deiner Gnade	Stegmann		
437 ö	Meine engen Grenzen	Eckert	Heurich	
440 ö	Hilf, Herr meines Lebens	Gustav Lohmann; Markus Jenny	Hans Puls	
442–446	Glaube, Hoffnung, Liebe (Faith, Hope, Love)			
446 ö	Lass uns in deinem Namen, Herr	Rommel	Rommel	
447–450	Wort Gottes (God's Word)			
448 ö	Herr, gib uns Mut zum Hören	Rommel	Rommel	
451–453	Segen (Blessing)			
451 ö	Komm, Herr, segne uns	Dieter Trautwein	Trautwein	Blessing
452	Der Herr wird dich mit seiner Güte segnen		Gabriel	
453 ö	Bewahre uns, Gott, behüte uns, Gott	Eugen Eckert	Anders Ruuth	
454–461	Sendung und Nachfolge (Mission)			
455 ö	Alles meinem Gott zu Ehren	Thurmair, G.		
456	Herr, du bist mein Leben	Sequeri	Sequeri	new song this edition
457	Suchen und fragen, hoffen und sehn	Zils	Akepsimas	NGL
458 ö	Selig seid ihr, wenn ihr einfach lebt	Friedrich Karl Barth, Peter Horst	Peter Janssens	
459	Selig seid ihr, wenn ihr Wunden heilt	Weber	Peter Janssens	same melody as 458
460 ö	Wer leben will wie Gott auf dieser Erde	Oosterhuis/Bergsma)		Passion
461 (ö)	Mir nach, spricht Christus, unser Held	Silesius	Gesius	
462–469	Schöpfung (Creation)			
463 ö	Wenn ich, o Schöpfer, deine Macht			
464 ö	Gott liebt diese Welt	Schulz	Schulz	
465	Das Jahr steht auf der Höhe			
467 ö	Erfreue dich, Himmel, erfreue dich, Erde			after Psalm 148
468 ö	Gott gab uns Atem	Bücken	Baltruweit	creation
470–475	Gerechtigkeit und Friede (Justice and Peace)			
470 ö	Wenn das Brot, das wir teilen	März	Grahl	
472	Manchmal feiern wir mitten im Tag	Albrecht	Peter Janssens	NGL
473	Da pacem Domine			
474	Wenn wir das Leben teilen	Florenz	Wackenheim	Offertory (NGL)
475 ö	Verleih uns Frieden gnädiglich			
477–487	Kirche − Ökumene (Church, Ecumenism)			
478	Ein Haus voll Glorie schauet			
479	Eine große Stadt ersteht	Silja Walter	Saladin	New Jerusalem
481 ö	Sonne der Gerechtigkeit			
484 ö	Dank sei dir, Vater, für das ewge Leben			
485 ö	O Jesu Christe, wahres Licht			
488–491	Taufe (Baptism)			
489 ö	Lasst uns loben, freudig loben	Georg Thurmair	Quack	
490	Segne dieses Kind	Zenetti	Schütz 1993	
492–498	Eucharistie (Eucharist)			
496	Tantum ergo sacramentum	Thomas Aquinas		
500–518	Tod und Vollendung (Death and Completion)			
500	Nun lässest du, o Herr			after Nunc dimittis
503 ö	Mitten wir im Leben sind	Luther	Luther	
510 ö	O Welt, ich muss dich lassen		Isaac	
520–537	Maria (Mary, mother of Jesus)			
520	Ave, maris stella			
521	Maria, dich lieben ist allzeit mein Sinn			
525	Freu dich, du Himmelskönigin			paraphrase of Regina caeli
526	Alle Tage sing und sage			paraphrase of "Omni die dic Mariae"
528	Ein Bote kommt, der Heil verheißt	Gerloff	1529	Annunciation
533 ö	Lasst uns erfreuen herzlich sehr			
534	Maria, breit den Mantel aus			Virgin of Mercy
535	Segne du, Maria, segne mich, dein Kind	Wöhler	Kindsmüller	
536	Gegrüßet seist du, Königin	Seidenbusch		Salve Regina
537	Ave Maria, gratia plena			Ave Maria
542–548	Heilige (Saints)			
543 ö	Wohl denen, die da wandeln	Becker	Schütz	after Psalm 119
545 ö	Sankt Martin ... ritt durch Schnee und Wind	traditional		St. Martin's Day
546	Christus, du Licht vom wahren Licht		Leisentrit, Quack	Apostles
549–554	Die himmlische Stadt (The Heavenly City)			
549 ö	Es wird sein in den letzten Tagen	Walter Schulz	Manfred Schlenker	Isaiah 2:2–5, peace
551 ö	Nun singt ein neues Lied dem Herren	Franc		
552 ö	Herr, mach uns stark		Vaughan Williams	
553 ö	Jerusalem, du hochgebaute Stadt	Meyfahrt	Franck	
554 ö	Wachet auf, ruft uns die Stimme	Nicolai	Nicolai	

== See also ==
- Category:German-language Catholic hymns
