= Lobt froh den Herrn =

Lutheran morning hymn

- Lutheran hymn
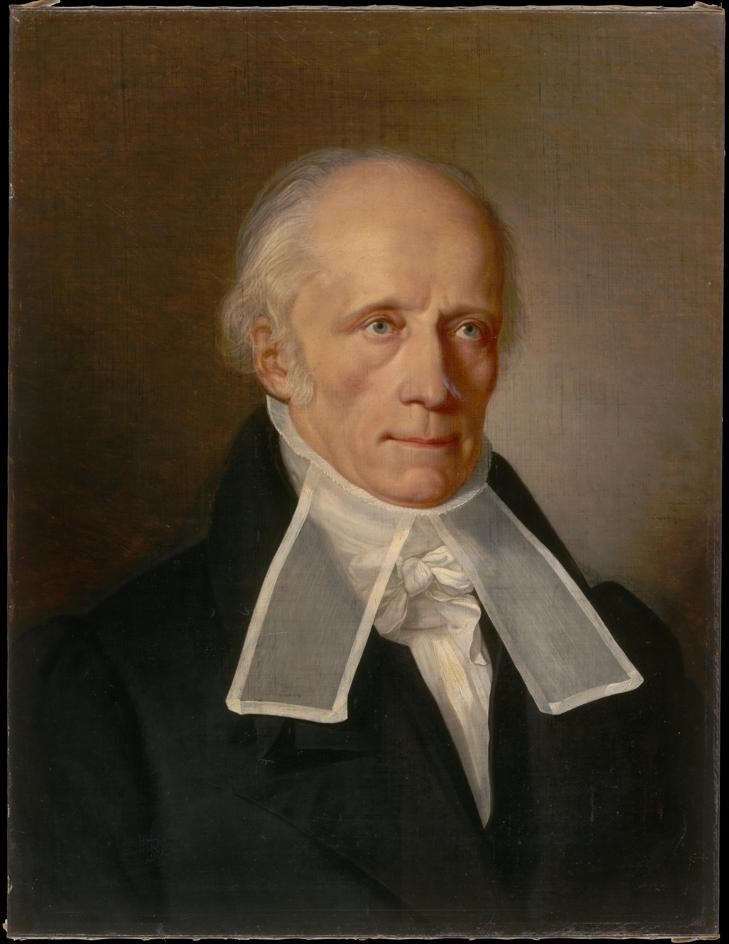
- Portrait of Gessner
- English: Praise the Lord gladly
- Written: 1795
- Text: by Georg Gessner
- Language: German
- Melody: by Hans Georg Nägeli
- Composed: 1815

"Lobt froh den Herrn" (Praise the Lord gladly) is a hymn of praise with a 1795 text by Georg Gessner and a melody by Hans Georg Nägeli, composed in 1815. The Lutheran hymn is still popular and appears shortened in hymnals including the Protestant Evangelisches Gesangbuch and the Catholic Gotteslob, and in songbooks.

== History ==
Gessner wrote the text of Lobt froh den Herrn in 1795 in 16 stanzas of six lines each. Hans Georg Nägeli composed a melody to fit in 1815. It is part of the Protestant Evangelisches Gesangbuch (1995) as EG 332, and the Catholic Gotteslob (2013), as GL 396, stanzas 1, 12, 13 and 16, and in many other hymnals and songbook including those for children and youth.

== Text and music ==
The poem of Lobt froh den Herrn is in 16 stanzas of six short lines each.

The repeated line "Lobt froh den Herrn" has the same function as the biblical Hallelujah: both a call to praise, and the praise. In modern versions, this line serves as a refrain concluding repeated all stanzas but the last one.

GL 396

1) Lobt froh den Herrn,
ihr jugendlichen Chöre!
Er höret gern
ein Lied zu seiner Ehre.
Lobt froh den Herrn! Lobt froh den Herrn!

2) Es schallt empor
zu deinem Heiligtume,
aus unserm Chor
ein Lied zu deinem Ruhme,
Lobt froh den Herrn! Lobt froh den Herrn!

3) Vom Preise voll
lass unser Herz dir singen!
Das Loblied soll
zu deinem Throne dringen,

4) Einst kommt die Zeit,
wo wir auf tausend Weisen,
o Seligkeit!
Dich, unsern Vater preisen,
von Ewigkeit zu Ewigkeit!

It was translated into English as "O praise the Lord! with happy children's voices" by Caroline Hanser.

Johann Crüger's melody in B-flat major in a triple metre with dotted notes responds to the positive mood of the text.
