= Jauchzet, ihr Himmel =

1731 German Christmas carol

- German Christmas carol
- English: "Rejoice, you Heavens"
- Text: by Gerhard Tersteegen
- Language: German
- Published: 1731

"Jauchzet, ihr Himmel" (Rejoice, you Heavens) is a German Christmas carol. The text, originally in eight stanzas was written by Gerhard Tersteegen in 1731. He assigned it to the popular melody of "Lobe den Herren" by Joachim Neander. In only the first seven stanzas, it is part of the current Protestant hymnal Evangelisches Gesangbuch as EG 41, and of the current German Catholic hymnal Gotteslob, as 251. It is published in 17 hymnals.

The theme is praise of Heaven and Earth that God came close to humans in a friendly way by becoming a child (Gott will so freundlich und nah ...). In the last stanza, the singer requests that God may also be born in him (werd auch in mir nun geboren).

Rudolf Mauersberger composed a different melody in 1926.

== See also ==
- List of Christmas carols
