= Es wird sein in den letzten Tagen =

1962 Christian hymn

- Christian hymn
- Written: 1963
- Text: by Walter Schulz
- Language: German
- Based on: Isaiah 2:2-5
- Melody: by Manfred Schlenker
- Composed: 1965

"Es wird sein in den letzten Tagen" (God loves this world) is a Christian hymn with words in German written by Walter Schulz in 1962, with a melody by Manfred Schlenker. It is based on prophecies by Isaiah 2:2-5. It appeared in Protestant and Catholic hymnals, and other songbooks.

== Background and history ==
Walter Schulz was a Protestant pastor who served from 1956 as Landesjugendpastor (state youth pastor) for the Evangelical Lutheran Church of Mecklenburg. In that function, he wrote the text of "Es wird sein in den letzten Tagen" in 1963. Manfred Schlenker added a melody in 1965.

The song became part of the Protestant hymnal Evangelisches Gesangbuch as EG 426, and of the Catholic hymnal Gotteslob as GL 549. The hymn is also part of other songbooks.
