= Das Jahr steht auf der Höhe =

Christian hymn

- Christian hymn
- Written: 1978
- Text: by Detlev Block
- Language: German
- Melody: by Johann Steuerlein
- Composed: 1575

"Das Jahr steht auf der Höhe" (The year is at its height) is a Christian hymn in German with a text by Detlev Block written in 1978 to an older melody by Johann Steuerlein. In the modern German Catholic hymnal Gotteslob, it appears as GL 465. The hymn initially focuses on observing nature and then compares its transience to that of human life.

== History and text ==
The text was written in 1978 by Detlev Block, born on 15 May 1934 in Hanover, who was a retired Protestant pastor and honorary professor, writer, poet and hymnwriter. The author described his motivation as the wish to write about consolation and encouragement facing the shadow of change and transience ("Welchen Trost, welche Ermutigung gibt es für uns, wenn der Schatten des Wechsels und der Vergänglichkeit auf uns fällt?") He wrote four stanzas in bar form, with a stollen of two lines and an abgesang of four lines.

The first topic is midsummer, taken as an image for the high point of a human life. The author compares the transience of nature to that of human existence, in the Biblical context of John the Baptist saying that Jesus will increase but he [John] will decrease (John 3:30). The poetry alludes to verses from Psalm 102, which call God to not end life at its height (Psalms 102:24) and say that God will be forever while his creatures pass (Psalms 102:26-28). In the third stanza, the singer reflects unity with Jesus in the sense of the mysticism of Meister Eckhart. The conclusion is a prayer for a person finally finding God before death and then hoping for resurrection.

== Melody ==
The text was written to a melody by Johannes Steuerlein that was associated with secular songs, first with the love song "Mit Lieb bin ich umfangen" (I am captured by love), then also with "Wie lieblich ist der Maien" (How lovely is May), which became part of the German Protestant hymnal Evangelisches Gesangbuch as EG 501. "Das Jahr steht auf der Höhe" was included, slightly revised, in the 2013 German common Catholic hymnal Gotteslob as GL 465, in the section "Leben in der Welt - Schöpfung" (Life in the World - Creation). It also appears in other songbooks.
