= Meine Hoffnung und meine Freude =

1988 hymn of the Communauté de Taizé

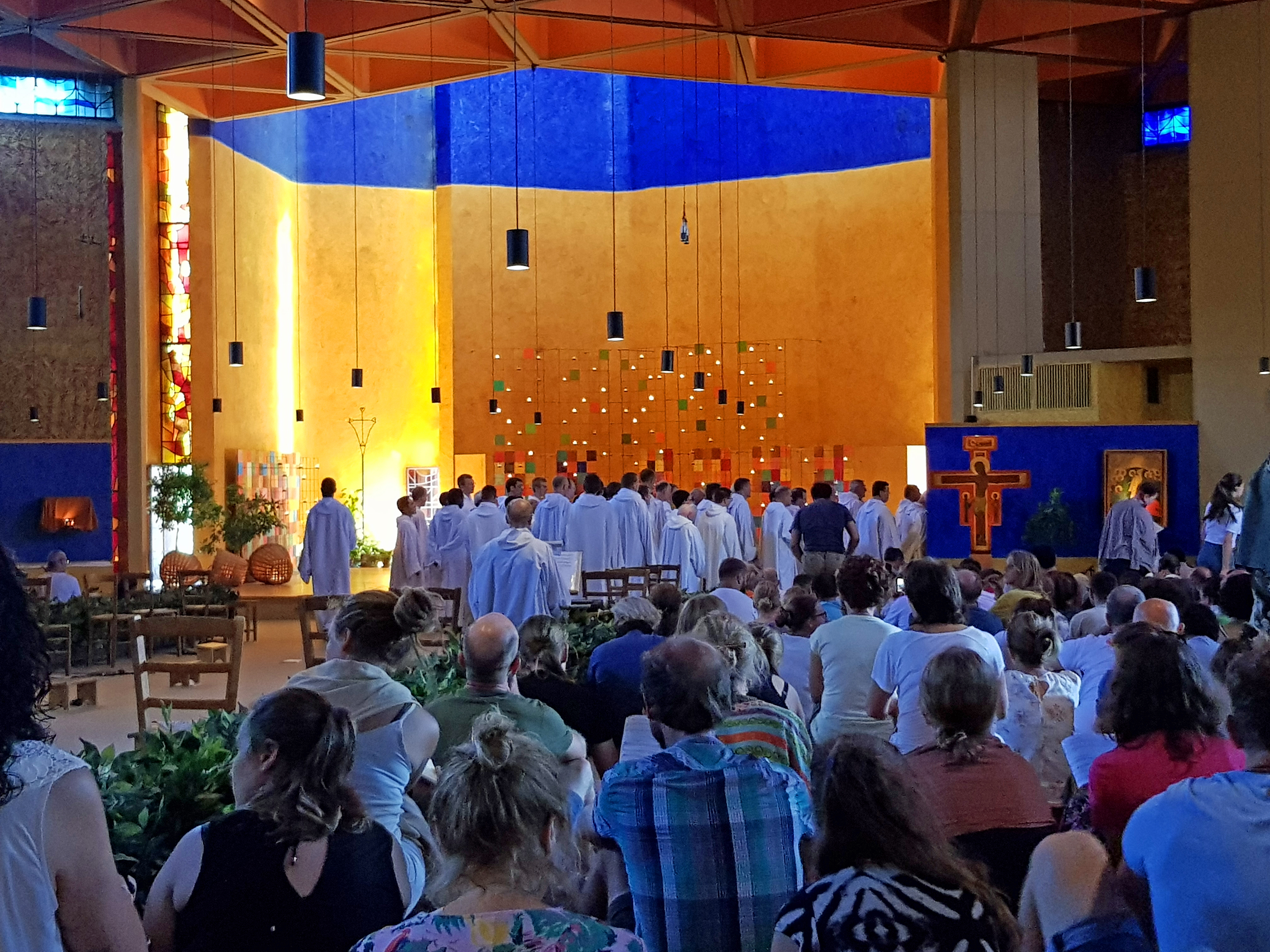
The song is often sung in the Church of Reconciliation of the Communauté de Taizé

"Meine Hoffnung und meine Freude" (lit: My hope and my joy) is a 1988 hymn of the Communauté de Taizé. It was originally written in Catalan and composed by Jacques Berthier. The English singable version begins "In the Lord I'll be ever thankful." It became known internationally and was published in 14 languages.

== History ==
Jacques Berthier wrote the song in 1988 as a hymn of the Communauté de Taizé, originally in Catalan. The song was written for a Europeam youth meeting in Barcelona. The song has been retained in all editions of the Taizé song book. The copyright is held by Ateliers et Presses de Taizé.

== Description ==
The song is based on Isaiah 12:2. It is typical for the Taizé songs: it is short and set for four voices, meant to be repeated oftend in a meditative way. It can be varied with solo singing and instruments. It is available in 14 languages; the English singable version begins "In the Lord I'll be ever thankful".

== Reception ==
The song became internationally known. It became part of the German common Catholic hymnal, Gotteslob, as GL 365. It is part of several regional sections of the Protestant hymnal, Evangelisches Gesangbuch.

The song was recorded in several collections, such as a 1999 album with Taizé songs, titled after a line from the song, "Auf dich vertrau ich" (In you I trust).
