= Johann Anastasius Freylinghausen =

German theologian and scholar (1670–1739)

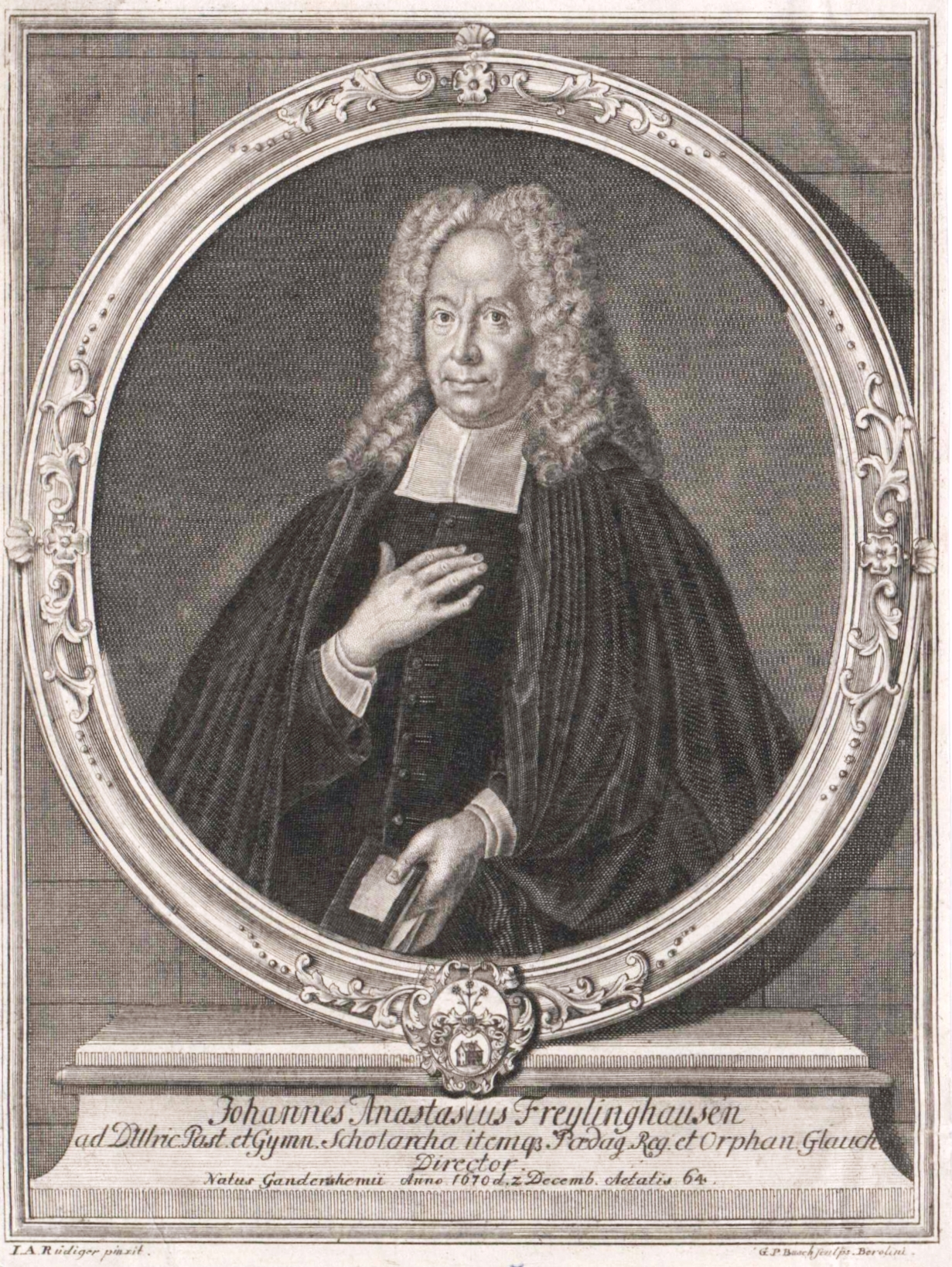
Johann Anastasius Freylinghausen

Johann Anastasius Freylinghausen (2 December 1670, Bad Gandersheim — 12 February 1739, Halle an der Saale) was a German Lutheran theologian associated with the Pietist Halle School and a scholar and follower of August Hermann Francke. He was the second director of the Franckeschen Stiftungen, a collection of schools for orphans.

== Biography ==
Freylinghausen was born on 2 December 1670. He studied theology in Jena and in 1695 was his assistant in ministry at St. Ulrich's Church in Halle. At his death in 1739, he was priest of St. Ulrich and director of the orphanages and boarding schools.

Freylinghausen's significance lies with his administrative accomplishment for all of the districts of hymnology. He himself wrote 44 hymns and published hymnals. His Geistreiches Gesangsbuch (Spiritual Songbook), a hymnal with 1500 old and new songs was known as "Freylinghausen's Songbook" abroad.

His hymns include Durch Adams Fall und Missetat and Mein Herz, gib dich zufrieden, und bleibe ganz geschieden.

== Family ==
He married Johanna Sophia Anastasia Francke, daughter of theologian August Hermann Francke.

== Legacy ==
A melody from his main hymnal was combined with a modern text, when it appeared in the common German hymnal Gotteslob in 2013, the penitential song "Zeige uns, Herr, deine Allmacht und Güte" as GL 272. He wrote an alternative melody for Paul Gerhardt's hymn "Die güldne Sonne voll Freud und Wonne", which was included, with a bassline by Johann Sebastian Bach, in the song collection Schemellis Gesangbuch. It included the tune Lubeck set to the words Die parente temporum that was translated by Sir Henry Williams Baker Bart.
