= Hilf, Herr meines Lebens =

Christian hymn

- Christian hymn
- Written: 1961
- Text: by Gustav Lohmann
- Language: German
- Melody: by Hans Puls
- Composed: 1962
- Published: 1975

"Hilf, Herr meines Lebens" (Help, Lord of my life) is a Christian hymn, with a text mostly written in 1961 by Gustav Lohmann, and a melody composed the following year by Hans Puls. The song, of the genre Neues Geistliches Lied (NGL), is part of German hymnals, including Gotteslob, and songbooks. It begins: "Hilf, Herr meines Lebens, dass ich nicht vergebens hier auf Erden bin" (Help, Lord of my life, that I am not on earth in vain).

== History ==
The Protestant pastor Gustav Lohmann wrote the text of "Hilf, Herr meines Lebens" in 1961, at age 85, and the musicologist Hans Puls composed a melody for it the following year. Both worked in an effort to express faith in contemporary texts and music in a genre later known as Neues Geistliches Lied (NGL). Puls was lecturer at the Pädagogische Hochschule in Saarbrücken where he met the questions of young people regarding the church in post-war Germany. He organised jazz church services, and was present at the 1960s Kirchentag conventions. The third stanza was added in 1970 by Markus Jenny. The song "Hilf, Herr meines Lebens" proved an ecumenical hit (ökumenischer Hit), which was included in both the Protestant and the Catholic hymnals. In Evangelisches Gesangbuch, it is EG 419. It was included in the Gotteslob in 1975 as GL 622, and was retained in 2013 in the second edition as GL 440, in the section "Gesänge – Leben in Gott – Bitte und Klage" (Chants – Life in God – Prayer and lament). The song is also part of several songbooks, including collections for young people and ecumenical songbooks.

== Text and music ==
The hymn is in five stanzas of four lines each, with the third line always repeating the second. The fifth stanza repeats the first. All lines follow the same scheme:

Hilf, Herr meines Lebens,
dass ich nicht vergebens,
dass ich nicht vergebens
hier auf Erden bin

In the following stanzas, the elements "meines Lebens", "nicht vergebens" and "hier auf Erden" are exchanged, while the structure of the prayer otherwise is the same. The second line requests help in not being annoying to one's neighbour, the third in not being bound to one's self, and the fourth in not being absent when one is needed. The melody, in D minor, follows the text in the repetition by a repeated musical phrase of this line. The theologian and hymn writer Eugen Eckert noted that Lohmann addressed essential human questions around leading a fulfilled life, written by an author who looked back on a life not without decisions he regretted.
