= Gott ist gegenwärtig =

1729 Christian hymn by Gerhard Tersteegen

- Christian hymn
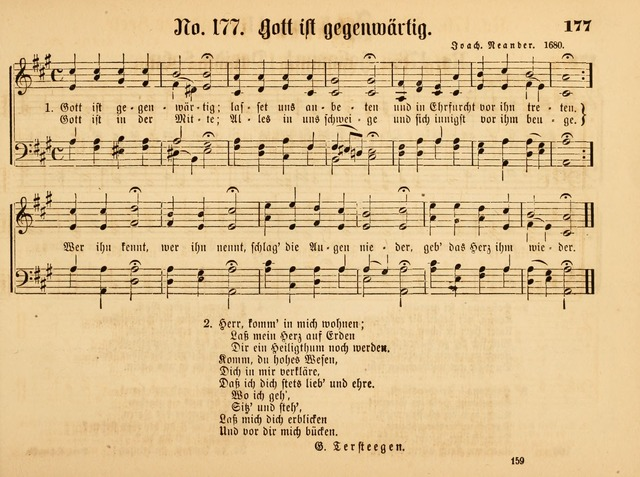
- An 1878 print in a Philadelphia hymnal
- Text: Gerhard Tersteegen
- Language: German
- Melody: Joachim Neander
- Composed: 1680
- Published: 1729

"Gott ist gegenwärtig" (God is present) is a Christian hymn in German by the Reformed writer Gerhard Tersteegen, published in 1729, based on a 1680 melody by Joachim Neander. The hymn, with the melody simplified, is part of the Protestant hymnal Evangelisches Gesangbuch as EG 165 and the 2013 Catholic hymnal Gotteslob as GL 387. Seven of its eight stanzas are part of the Mennonite hymnal as No. 1. The hymn is regarded as an expression of Christian mysticism. It was translated to English in various versions.

== History ==
The Reformed theologian and author Gerhard Tersteegen has been described as a mystic, longing for a spiritual union with God. He published "Gott ist gegenwärtig" in his collection Geistliches Blumengärtlein inniger Seelen (Spiritual little flower garden of intimate souls) in 1729. The melody mentioned there is that of the hymn "Wunderbarer König" written by Joachim Neander in 1680.

The hymn, with the melody simplified, is part of the Protestant hymnal Evangelisches Gesangbuch as EG 165. It was not included in the Catholic hymnal Gotteslob after a discussion, but was marked to appear as an ecumenical song (marked "ö") in the following edition in March 1988. In the Gotteslob of 2013, it is GL 387, in the section Leben in Gott – Lob, Dank und Anbetung (Life in God – praise, thanks and adoration). Seven of its eight stanzas are part of the Mennonitisches Gesangbuch as No. 1. It has been translated to English in several versions, including "God himself is with us".

== Form ==
Each stanza follows the complex pattern of Neander's "Wunderbarer König" with eight lines of irregular length and rhyming in pair, A–A–B–B–C–C–D–D. The trochee rhythm, alternating stressed and unstressed syllables, is marked x and –. The form is called Pokalstrophe because the typography of a stanza resembles a chalice, in an artful form of Baroque poetry:

x–x–x–x–x–x–
x–x–x–x–
x–x–x–x–x–x–
x–x–x–x–
x–x
x–x
x–x–x–

x–x–x–

== Content and text ==
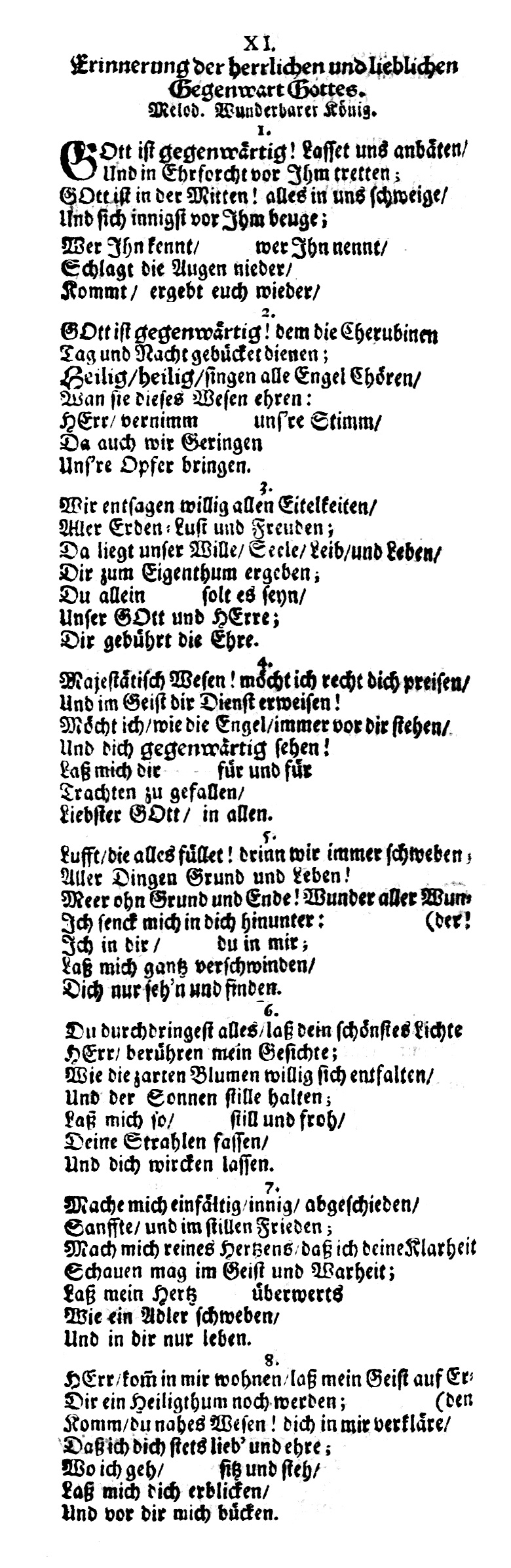
"Gott ist gegenwärtig" in the first edition of 1729

Tersteegen's original title for the hymn was "Erinnerung der herrlichen und lieblichen Gegenwart Gottes", meaning raising awareness of the glorious and lovely presence of God, one of Tersteegen's main topics. In the first three stanzas the awareness of God is expressed from the perspective of the congregation, then in stanzas 4–8 the awareness is expressed from the perspective of the individual.

God's presence is declared, and adored with the angels, but also prayed for. In the fifth stanza, Tersteegen evokes a mystic union, writing: "Ich in dir, du in mir, laß mich ganz verschwinden, dich nur seh'n und finden." (I in you, you in me, let me completely disappear, only see and find you.) The following text is given as in current hymnals but with the original text in footnotes:

1. Gott ist gegenwärtig. Lasset uns anbeten
und in Ehrfurcht vor ihn treten.
Gott ist in der Mitte. Alles in uns schweige
und sich innigst vor ihm beuge.
Wer ihn kennt,
wer ihn nennt,
schlag (Note: Originally: "schlagt") die Augen nieder;
kommt, ergebt euch wieder.

5. Luft, die alles füllet, drin wir immer schweben,
aller Dinge Grund und Leben,
Meer ohn Grund und Ende, Wunder aller Wunder:
Ich senk mich in dich hinunter.
Ich in dir,
du in mir,
lass mich ganz verschwinden,
dich nur sehn und finden.

2. Gott ist gegenwärtig, dem die Kerubinen
Tag und Nacht gebücket dienen.
„Heilig, heilig, heilig“ singen ihm zur Ehre
aller Engel hohe Chöre. (Note: Originally: "Heilig, heilig, singen alle Engel Chören, / wann sie dieses Wesen ehren".)
Herr, vernimm
unsre Stimm,
da auch wir Geringen
unsre Opfer bringen.

6. Du durchdringest alles; lass dein schönstes Lichte,
Herr, berühren mein Gesichte.
Wie die zarten Blumen willig sich entfalten
und der Sonne stille halten,
lass mich so
still und froh
deine Strahlen fassen
und dich wirken lassen.

3. Wir entsagen willig allen Eitelkeiten,
aller Erdenlust und Freuden;
da liegt unser Wille, Seele, Leib und Leben
dir zum Eigentum ergeben.
Du allein
sollst es sein,
unser Gott und Herre,
dir gebührt die Ehre.

7. Mache mich einfältig, innig, abgeschieden,
sanft und still in deinem Frieden; (Note: Originally: "sanfte und im stillen Frieden")
mach mich reinen Herzens, dass ich deine Klarheit
schauen mag in Geist und Wahrheit;
lass mein Herz
überwärts
wie ein’ Adler schweben
und in dir nur leben.

4. Majestätisch Wesen, möcht ich recht dich preisen
und im Geist dir Dienst erweisen.
Möcht ich wie die Engel immer vor dir stehen
und dich gegenwärtig sehen.
Lass mich dir
für und für
trachten zu gefallen,
liebster Gott, in allem.

8. Herr, komm in mir wohnen, lass mein’ Geist auf Erden
dir ein Heiligtum noch werden;
komm, du nahes Wesen, dich in mir verkläre,
dass ich dich stets lieb und ehre.
Wo ich geh,
sitz und steh,
lass mich dich erblicken
und vor dir mich bücken.

== Melody and settings ==
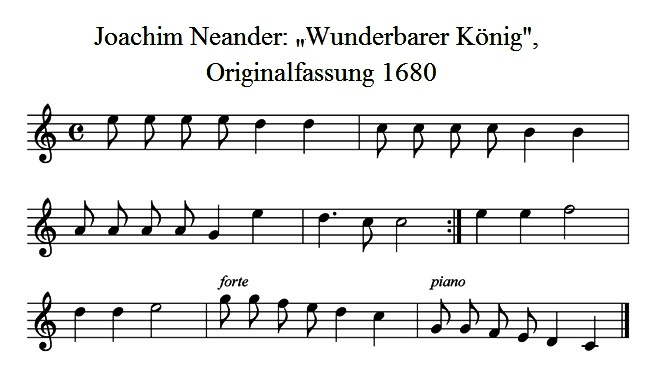
Original of Neander's melody

Neander's melody for "Wunderbarer König" (Wonderful King) had a wide range and was more suitable for solo singing or small groups of singers. It was simplified early for congregational use, sacrificing the interesting rhythmic differences of the original. In current hymnals, some features of the original were restored.

Heinrich von Herzogenberg composed a chorale cantata in 1897 on the occasion of Tersteegen's bicentenary, encouraged by Friedrich Spitta. In 2019, when Tersteegen's 250th anniversary of death was remembered, the alto-saxophonist Uwe Steinmetz composed a cantata on the song, titled God is Now, scored for mixed choir, big band, pipe organ and live electronics. It was premiered at the Gedächtniskirche in Berlin on 3 April 2019, with students and the NDR Bigband.

== Translations ==
The hymn has been translated or adapted to English in different ways. John Wesley translated it as "Only God is with us", first published in Hymns & Sacred Poems in 1739. His translation of the first six stanzas was described as free but in the spirit of Tersteegen's poem. It was printed, with variants, in several English and American hymnals. Another free translation, "The Lamb is slain, let us adore", was written by W. Delamotte, and was first printed in the Moravian Hymn Book of 1742. A version "God reveals His presence" was written by Frederick William Foster and John Miller, who tried to match the metre of the melody. It appeared first in the Moravian Hymn Book of 1789. It was modified to a form in three stanzas, which is in common use, by William Mercer and published in his hymnal Church Psalter & Hymn Book in 1855.
