= Wohl denen, die da wandeln =

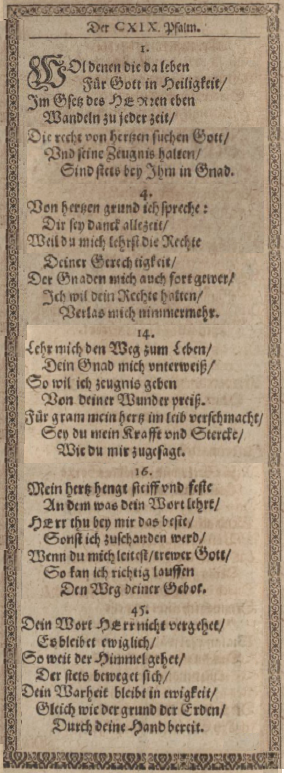
Stanzas 1, 4, 14, 16 and 45 of Cornelius Becker's psalm paraphrase

Wohl denen, die da wandeln (Blessed are those who walk) is a hymn with a text by Cornelius Becker, who paraphrased Psalm 119 in 1602. The common melody was composed by Heinrich Schütz in 1661. Versions of it are part of modern Protestant and Catholic hymnals in German.

== History ==
Becker was professor of theology professor at the Leipzig University and pastor at the Lutheran Nikolaikirche in Leipzig. He used a vacation time to write a psalter of metric paraphrases of all psalms, as a Lutheran pendant to the reformed Genevan Psalter. Psalm 119 has 176 verses in Hebrew which he rendered in 88 stanzas of seven lines each. The first line was originally "Wol denen die da leben Für Gott in Heiligkeit".

Becker had known Lutheran hymn tunes in mind for his psalms, and associated "Wol denen die da leben" with "Hilff Gott das mir gelinge", a tune that first appeared in a 1545 Leipzig hymnal and that was later sung with the text "Wenn meine Sünd' mich kränken", EG 82 in the Protestant hymnal Evangelisches Gesangbuch. Both songs are Passion songs, in a modale key with minor charakter.

Heinrich Schütz published a choral collection with new melodies and four-part settings of Becker's texts, which became known as the Becker Psalter. In the revised edition of 1661 Schütz divided the 88 stanzas of the song in eight sections with different melodies. The melody that he created for stanzas 21 to 32 is the one used in modern hymnals. It is marked by simplicity and even rhythm in a mood of cheerful trust, which matches the text.

At the beginning of the 20th century, Theodor Goldschmid, a pastor in Zürich, chose four stanzas (1, 4, 16 und 45) for Otto Riethmüller's song books, which were widely distributed between the world wars. The Protestant hymnal in German Evangelisches Kirchengesangbuch of 1950 contains these four stanzas, retained in the Evangelisches Gesangbuch of 1993 as EG 295, including the four-part setting by Schütz. The Catholic Gotteslob of 1975 had a version in three stanzas as GL 614, with stanzas 1 and 45 and in-between a combination from stanzas 14 and 19. The second edition of 2013 has as GL 543 five stanzas, the combination stanza and the four stanzas from the EG.
