= Wir danken dir, Herr Jesu Christ =

- Christian hymn
- English: We thank you, Lord Jesus Christ
- Occasion: Passion of Jesus
- Written: 1568
- Text: by Christoph Fischer
- Language: German
- Melody: by Nikolaus Herman
- Composed: 1551
- Published: 1783 Salzburg

"Wir danken dir, Herr Jesu Christ" (We thank you, Lord Jesus Christ) is a Christian Passion hymn in German with text by Christoph Fischer published in 1568 to a 1551 melody by Nikolaus Herman. The song is part of current hymnals in German, the 1995 Evangelisches Gesangbuch and the 2013 Catholic hymnal Gotteslob as GL 297 and of other hymnals and songbooks.

== History ==
The Protestant theologian Christoph Fischer wrote the text of the Passion hymn "Wir danken dir, Herr Jesu Christ" in 1568 to a melody by Nikolaus Herman. It expresses thanks for the Passion of Jesus.

The hymn appeared in many hymnals through the centuries. In the Protestant Evangelisches Gesangbuch of 1995, it is EG 79, and in the 2013 Gotteslob it is GL 297. It is part of many other hymnals and songbooks.

The hymn is in four stanzas of four lines each, rhyming AABB. It expresses thankfulness and consolation, rather than mourning, in simple language and a matching simple melody.
