= Dass du mich einstimmen lässt in deinen Jubel, o Herr =

Christian hymn

- Christian hymn, round
- English: That you let me join in singing your praise
- Text: by Jesus Bruderschaft
- Language: German
- Melody: by Jesus Bruderschaft
- Composed: 1976

"Dass du mich einstimmen lässt in deinen Jubel, o Herr" (That you let me join in singing your praise) is a Christian hymn of praise in German, with text and music created in 1976 by the Jesus Bruderschaft, a community at Kloster Gnadenthal in Hesse, Germany. The song, of the genre Neues Geistliches Lied (NGL), is part of the German hymnal Gotteslob and of songbooks. It can be sung as a round.

== History ==
The Jesus Bruderschaft, a community at Kloster Gnadenthal, created the text and music of "Dass du mich einstimmen lässt" in 1976.

The song became part of the Catholic common hymnal Gotteslob of 2013 as GL 389, in the section "Lob, Dank und Anbetung" (Chants – Praise, thanks and devotion). The song is also part of several songbooks, including collections for young people and ecumenical songbooks.

== Text and music ==
The hymn is in six stanzas with a short strophe of two lines, and a longer refrain of four lines. It is written in the first person, speaking in the refrain about the elevation of the singer's soul when joining in songs of praise of God. The stanzas mention reasons for the praise. The melody of the first half of the refrain is repeated in its second half. The melody of the strophes is in a higher range. The music is fit to be sung as a round.
