= Wenn ich, o Schöpfer, deine Macht =

Christian hymn

- Poem and Christian hymn
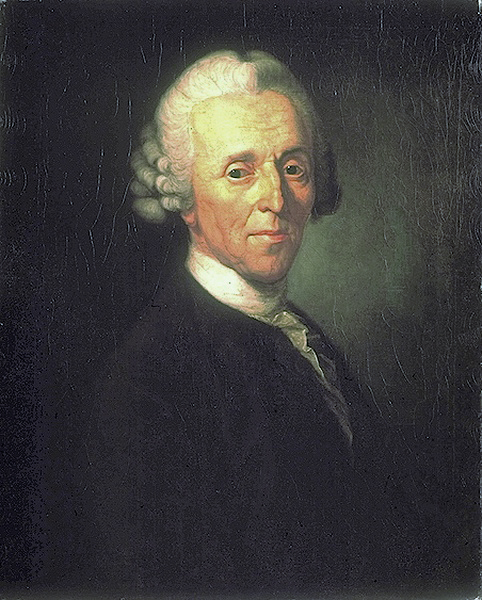
- The poet
- English: When I, o Creator, [reflect on] Your power
- Text: by Christian Fürchtegott Gellert
- Language: German
- Melody: Peter Sohren
- Composed: 1668
- Published: 1757

"Wenn ich, o Schöpfer, deine Macht" (When I, O Creator, [reflect on] Your power) is a sacred poem in German by Christian Fürchtegott Gellert, titled "Preis des Schöpfers" (Praise of the Creator). It became a Christian hymn with an older melody by Peter Sohren. It is still popular and appears in hymnals including the Protestant Evangelisches Gesangbuch and the Catholic Gotteslob.

The poem was first published in 1757 and is associated with the Age of Enlightenment. It contains Gellert's views on the greatness of nature reflecting the accomplishments of a creator god. Gellert relied little on biblical wording, but drew from his own observations about the natural world. The melody by Soohren is nearly a century older than the poem, and was first published in 1668.

== History ==
Gellert was a philosopher and poet of the Age of Enlightenment. He published the poem in a collection titled Geistliche Oden und Lieder (Spiritual Odes and Songs) in 1757, titled "Preis des Schöpfers" (Praise of the Creator).

The poem "Wenn ich, o Schöpfer, deine Macht" has six stanzas in bar form, also called Lutherstrophe, and is a praise of the Creation. A starting point for Gellert was the hymn "Sei Lob und Ehr dem höchsten Gut" (Praise and honour be to the highest good" (EG 326), but Gellert phrased freely and independently. He relied little on biblical wording, but drew from observations in nature. The first stanza mentions, from a position of reflection and adoration, that it is impossible to praise the greatness of the creation sufficiently, which is contradicted in the following stanzas. The second stanza begins "Mein Auge sieht, wohin es blickt, die Wunder deiner Werke" (My eye sees wherever it looks the miracles of Your works), with the following stanzas naming examples, concluding with man as body and mind ("Leib und Geist"). The final stanza calls all elements of creation to praise God as their origin. The poem is rich in rhetorical expressions.

With a melody by Peter Sohren from 1668, originally used for "Bis hierher hat mich Gott gebracht" (EG 329), it became a Christian hymn. The song is part of hymnals in German, including the Protestant Evangelisches Gesangbuch (1995) as EG 506, and the Catholic Gotteslob (2013), as GL 463, in the section Schöpfung (Creation).
