= O Herr, nimm unsre Schuld =

Christian hymn

- Christian hymn
- English: O Lord, take our guilt
- Occasion: Lent
- Written: 1964
- Text: Hans-Georg Lotz
- Language: German
- Meter: 6 7 6 7
- Melody: Hans-Georg Lotz
- Composed: 1964
- Published: 1975

"O Herr, nimm unsre Schuld" ('O Lord, take our guilt') is a Christian hymn of penitence. Both text and music were written by Hans-Georg Lotz in 1964. The song in four stanzas appears in the 2013 Catholic hymnal Gotteslob as GL 273 in the section for Lent, and in many hymnals of various denominations.

== History ==
Hans-Georg Lotz wrote text and music of "O Herr, nimm unsre Schuld" in 1964. It was included in the first Catholic hymnal Gotteslob in 1975 as GL 168, and retained in its 2013 second edition as GL 273, in the section for Lent, the time of penitence and fasting in preparation of Easter (Österliche Bußzeit – Fastenzeit). It was also included in many other hymnals of different denominations, and in songbooks.

== Text and melody ==
Weber wrote "O Herr, nimm unsre Schuld" in four stanzas of four lines each. The text deals with the human experience of becoming guilty in simple language, avoiding traditional vocabulary such as "sin". The melody is simple as well, in uncomplicated rhythm and alluding to modal harmony.
