= Lobet und preiset, ihr Völker, den Herrn =

Christian song

- Christian round
- Text: based on psalms
- Language: German

"Lobet und preiset, ihr Völker, den Herrn" (Praise the Lord, all peoples) is a round for three parts to a German text based on three psalms. The melody has been passed orally. The round, a general expression of praise, is part of many hymnals and songbooks, and used for many occasions. It is easy and also suitable for children and young adults.

== History ==
The text of "Lobet und preiset, ihr Völker, den Herrn" ("Praise the Lord, you nations"). It is a call to praise the Lord, be glad in him and serve Him. it is inspired by several verses from the psalms, including Psalm 117:1, Psalm 100:2 and Psalm 67:4–6. The composition is a round written for three parts, with a simple melody traditionally passed down orally. It is a psalm song of general praise, often sung as an alternative to a psalm, and used to express praise for variety reasons.

The melody is easy, with the second line in third-parallels to the first, and the third line being a bass foundation. It is recommended for services involving children, with accompanying movements designed for the groups participation. The song is also included in collections for young adults.

Played on an organ

Played on the organ, this round is featured in many hymnals and songbooks. In the common Protestant hymnal Evangelisches Gesangbuch, it is listed as EG 337. In the Catholic hymnal Gotteslob, it was GL 282 in the first edition and 408 in the second edition.

== Music ==
The music is commonly written in F major; it is in a triple metre.

It begins with the highest note, which eases the beginning. The first two lines move mostly in steady rhythm, with a dotted note at the beginning of the second measure. The last note holds the key note for all measures.

Bärenreiter published a setting for band, as for other songs from Gotteslob.
