= Herr, nimm auch uns zum Tabor mit =

Contemporary Christian hymn

- Catholic hymn
- Written: 2001
- Text: by Peter Gerloff
- Language: German
- Melody: by Richard Mailänder

"Herr, nimm auch uns zum Tabor mit" (Lord, take us also along to Mount Tabor) is a Christian hymn with text by Peter Gerloff, written in 2001, with a melody by Richard Mailänder. The song was included in the Catholic hymnal Gotteslob.

== History ==
The text was written by Peter Gerloff in 2001 because he felt that few hymns dealt with the topic of the transfiguration of Jesus on Mount Tabor. It is a regular gospel reading of the Catholic Church on the second Sunday of Lent, alternately read from the Gospels of Matthew, Mark and Luke, and on the Feast of the Transfiguration (August 6).

The song has three stanzas of four lines each, and a refrain. The singing community addresses Jesus as if his ascent to the mountain recurred now. The refrain says "Du wirst auch uns verklären, Herr der Herren" (You will transfigure us also, Lord of Lords). The three stanzas reflect the climb of the mountain, the stay, and the return. The first stanza is a request to be taken along to the mountain, inducing hope, step by step, to experience the light of God. The second stanza requests to see the glory of God, as a preview of an eternal light as the destination of all labours, referring to a phrase from the Book of Revelation. The third stanza expects a return to the valley of everyday sorrows (Tal der Alltagssorgen), requesting guidance and support, with a walking stick (Wanderstab) mentioned, ultimately for the walk towards the Cross and Easter.

Richard Mailänder, a musicologist and then church music director of the Diocese of Cologne, composed a melody for the song in 2007. It follows an ascent step by step, and ends with a leap downwards of an octave, parallel to the return to the sorrows of normal life. An alternative melody is the tune of Gelobt seist du, Herr Jesu Christ. The hymn was included in the German Catholic hymnal Gotteslob in 2013 as GL 363, in the section Leben in God (Life in God).
