= Du rufst uns, Herr, an deinen Tisch =

2009 German-language hymn

- Christian hymn
- Occasion: Offertory
- Written: 1969
- Text: by Johannes Jourdan
- Language: German
- Melody: by
- Composed: 1969
- Published: 1975

"Du rufst uns, Herr, an deinen Tisch" (You, Lord, call us to your table) is a Christian hymn with German text by Johannes Jourdan and a melody by Andreas Lehmann. The song, of the genre Neues Geistliches Lied (NGL), is part of German hymnals, including Gotteslob.

== History ==
Johannes Jourdan, a Protestant pastor in Darmstadt, wrote the text of "Du rufst uns, Herr, an deinen Tisch" in 1969, and Andreas Lehmann provided the melody the same year.

The hymn, in four stanzas of six lines each, is of the genre Neues Geistliches Lied (NGL). Jourdan wrote his text in the first person plural, from the perspective of a community. The first stanza addresses Jesus as the Lord who called to his table and serves himself. The second stanza describes "us" as coming from forlornness. The third stanza mentions that "we" listen to the word sending us into the world to bring peace. The last stanza recalls the first, with a focus on the presence of Jesus to all in need. All stanzas conclude with a similar acclamation: "Herr, dein Wort ist die Kraft" (Lord, your word is the power), followed by different things it achieves: create something new, create reconciliation, create peace, and create love.

The song was included in the German Catholic hymnal Gotteslob in 2013 as GL 146, in the section "Gesänge zur Eröffnung" (Chants for opening). It is part of other hymnals and songbooks.
