= Erde, singe =

- German Christmas carol
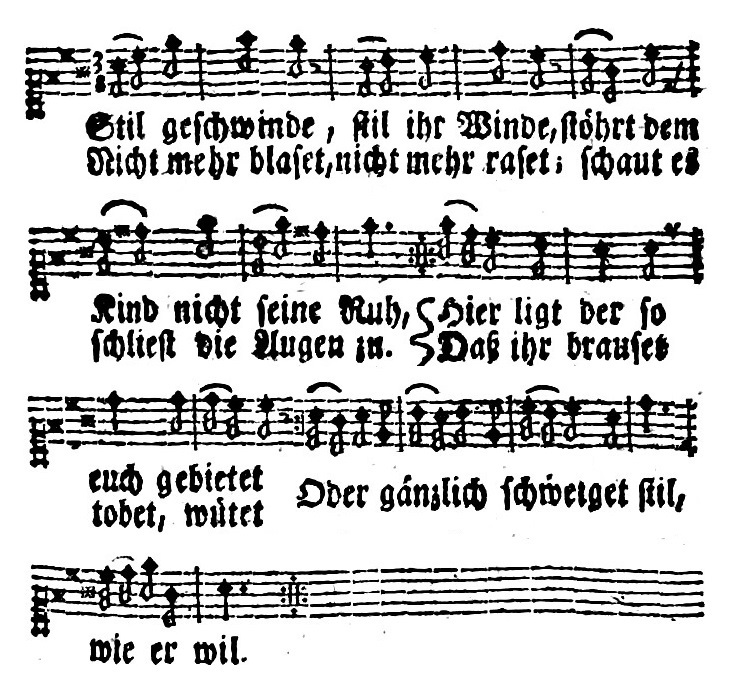
- Melody, with text "Still geschwinde", in the second edition, Cologne, 1755
- English: "Earth, Sing"
- Written: 1837
- Text: by Johannes Geissel
- Language: German
- Melody

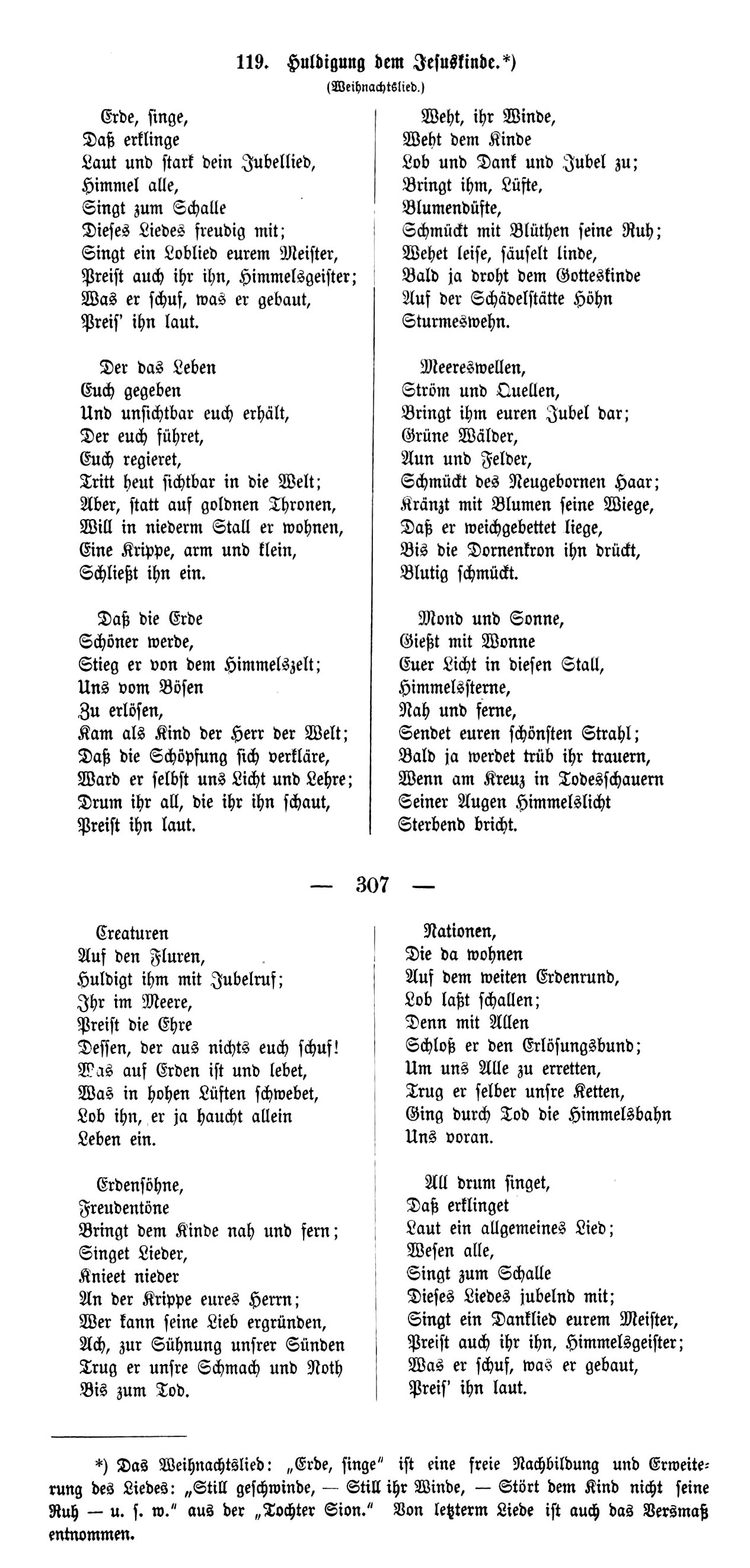
Version in Schriften und Reden von Johannes Cardinal von Geissel, Cologne, 1869

"Erde, singe" ("Earth, sing") is a German Catholic hymn with a text by Johannes Cardinal of Geissel, Archbishop of Cologne, written in 1837 as a Christmas carol in ten stanzas. The current Catholic hymnal Gotteslob has only four stanzas as GL 411, which are in the general section of praise.

== History ==
Johannes Geissel wrote the lyrics in 1837 as a Christmas carol in ten stanzas.

In a version printed version of 1969, the song is called a paraphrase and expansion ("Nachbildung und Erweiterung") of a different song, "Still geschwinde, — Still ihr Winde, — Stört dem Kind nicht seine Ruh" from the collection Tochter Sion, a hymnal for use at church and at home, published by Heinrich Lindenborn in 1741 in Cologne. The song "Still geschwinde" is titled "Die Hirten singen dem schlafenden Heilande" (The shepherds sing for the sleeping Saviour), a pastoral lullaby in a triple metre. The same melody was used also for "Erde, singe" and is the current melody, with only slight changes reducing ornaments and melismas.

When the German Catholic hymnal Gotteslob was compiled in 1975, the song was not chosen for the common section (Stammteil), but was part of most regional sections. In the current Gotteslob of 2013, it appears in the common section, but in only four stanzas, and as GL 411, which is in the general section of praise, not noticeably related to Christmas.

== Content ==
Geissel used only some elements from the eight stanzas of the model "Still geschwinde", in which wind, snow and rain are called to silence in order to not disturb the slumber of the baby. Being created by God, the natural forces have to obey, and praise by becoming silent.

This idea of praise by all creation is the main theme of Geissel from the beginning. All creatures are not called to silence, but to loud praise of the incarnation in singing and rejoicing. Several of the ten stanzas anticipate the Passion of Jesus, but only one of these (No. 9) became part of the current version (No. 3). It is the only one of the four current stanzas with an allusion to Christmas: "Um uns alle zu erretten, trug er selber unsre Ketten" (To rescue us all, he himself carried our chains), while the others focus of the praise of all creatures. The song is listed in the section Lob, Dank und Anbetung (Praise, thanks, and adoration). Several regions use it for Thanksgiving (Erntedankfest).

== Text ==
The text is from the shortened version in the current Gotteslob.

German

Erde, singe,
dass es klinge,
laut und stark dein Jubellied!
Himmel alle,
singt zum Schalle
dieses Liedes jauchzend mit!
Singt ein Loblied eurem Meister!
Preist ihn laut, ihr Himmelsgeister!
Was er schuf, was er gebaut,
preis ihn laut!

Kreaturen
auf den Fluren,
huldigt ihm mit Jubelruf!
Ihr im Meere,
preist die Ehre
dessen, der aus nichts euch schuf!
Was auf Erden ist und lebet,
was in hohen Lüften schwebet,
lob ihn! Er haucht ja allein
Leben ein.

Nationen,
die da wohnen
auf dem weiten Erdenrund,
Lob lasst schallen,
denn mit allen
schloss er den Erlösungsbund.
Um uns alle zu erretten,
trug er selber unsre Ketten,
ging durch Tod die Himmelsbahn
uns voran.

Jauchzt und singet,
dass es klinget,
laut ein allgemeines Lied!
Wesen alle,
singt zum Schalle
dieses Liedes jubelnd mit!
Singt ein Danklied eurem Meister,
preist ihn laut, ihr Himmelsgeister.
Was er schuf, was er gebaut,
preis ihn laut!

English

Earth, go singing,
let it be ringing:
a loud and a strong and a jubilant song!
Heavens together
thund'ringly gather
in this song to rejoice along!
Sing a song of praise to the Lord,
spirits of Heaven, strike the chord:
what He created, what He made
His praise parade!

Oh ye creatures
of land-born features,
worship Him with jubliant call!
Ye in the oceans,
praise the notions
'f the Honor of Him who from nought made you all!
What is on Earth a living being,
what flies the air, the Earth's pull fleeing,
praise Him! For, He only, He
breathes life to ye!

Rejoice, go singing,
let it be ringing:
a loud and a jubilant general song!
Beings together
thund'ringly gather
in this song to sing, exultant, along!
Sing a song of thanks to the Lord,
spirits of Heaven, strike the chord:
what He created, what He made
His praise parade!

== Melody ==
Colin Mawby created a setting for mixed four-part choir with organ ad libitum in 2012.
