= Atme in uns, Heiliger Geist =

Contemporary Christian hymn

- Catholic hymn
- Occasion: Pentecost
- Text: by Jean-Marc Morin
- Language: German
- Melody: by Pierre and Viviane Mugnier
- Published: 1982

"Atme in uns, Heiliger Geist" (Breath in us, Holy Spirit) is a Christian hymn for Pentecost, a song of the genre Neues Geistliches Lied (NGL) first created in France and published in 1982. The song was included in the 2013 Catholic hymnal in German, Gotteslob, and appears in songbooks.

== History ==
The text and music of Atme in uns, Heiliger Geist were first written in French in the early 1980s. The text was written by Jean-Marc Morin, the melody by Pierre and Viviane Mugnier. It was published by Emmanuel Songs in 1982. The text was translated into German by Thomas Csanady and Roger Ibounigg.

The text begins with a refrain requesting the Holy Spirit to breathe in us, burn in us, work in us, and to come as the breath of God, with all these attributes based on Biblical sources. It is expanded by three verses.

The hymn was included in the German Catholic hymnal Gotteslob in 2013 as GL 346., in the section Pfingsten (Pentecost). It appears in several songbooks.
