= Wenn wir das Leben teilen =

Christian hymn

- Christian hymn
- English: When we share life
- Written: 2001
- Text: by Hans Florenz
- Language: German
- Melody: by Michael Wackenheim

"Wenn wir das Leben teilen" (When we share life) is a 2001 Christian offertory hymn with text by Hans Florenz, with a melody by Michael Wackenheim. The hymn of the genre Neues Geistliches Lied is contained in several hymnals and songbooks.

== History ==
The text "Wenn wir das Leben teilen" was written by Hans Florenz The melody was composed by Michael Wackenheim.

The song has five stanzas, all ending with a refrain. The melody is in E minor and in common time. It is dominated by lively eighth-notes; only the call "Jesus Christ" features three quarter-notes in a row, beginning both lines of the refrain. The song of the genre Neues Geistliches Lied (NGL) is contained in the common German Catholic hymnal, Gotteslob, as GL 474. It is also contained in hymnals for young people, such as Ein Segen sein. It has been recommended as an offertory hymn for weddings, also usable for the opening or closing of such events.

The Katholikentag in Stuttgart in 2022 had the motto "leben teilen" (share life), taken from the song which was featured often.
