= Heilig, heilig, heilig Gott =

Catholic hymn composed in 2007

- German Catholic hymn
- English: Holy, holy, holy God
- Text: Sanctus
- Language: German
- Melody: Oliver Sperling
- Composed: 2007
- Published: 2013

"Heilig, heilig, heilig Gott" (Holy, holy, holy God) is a German Catholic hymn. The text is the liturgical Sanctus in German. The melody was composed by Oliver Sperling in 2007. It is part of the 2013 German Catholic hymnal Gotteslob as GL 200, in the section Sanctus.

Oliver Sperling, a church musician from Cologne, composed a melody to the liturgical text, which is part of the Mass ordinary, in 2007 for the second edition of the Gotteslob. Set in D major and common time, it uses lively eighth-notes for flow and movement, resting on stressed syllables such as God.
