= Gott Vater, sei gepriesen =

1838 song

- Christian hymn
- Language: German
- Meter: 7 6 7 6 7 7 3 3 7
- Published: 1838

"Gott Vater, sei gepriesen" (lit.; God Father, be praised) is a Christian hymn in German, published in 1838. It is part of German hymnals, and was translated as "Sing Praise to Our Creator". "All Praise and Glad Thanksgiving" is sung to the same hymn tune.

"Gott Vater, sei gepriesen" appeared first in 1838 in a hymnal in Limburg, then in Mainz in 1902. The topic is praise of the Trinity, combined with prayers for various matters. The author and composer of the melody is not known. The song is part of regional sections of the German Catholic hymnal Gotteslob, such as in Limburg as GL 792 (without the sixth stanza), in Fulda as GL 795, and in Mainz as GL 869.

The text consists of seven stanzas of eight lines each, with the last four lines a refrain of praise following the model of the Trisagion. It begins "Heiliger dreieinger Gott, Licht im Leben, Heil im Tod" (Holy triune God, light in life, salvation in death) and ends with the call to praise and thank forever. The first stanza calls to praise the three persons of the Trinity. The second stanza, "Versöhne, was gespalten" (Reconcile what is divided), is focused on unity in Christianity. The third stanza prays for wisdom given to leaders. The fourth stanza prays for peace in the world, and walking on paths of peace with determination day by day ("und Tag für Tag entschieden des Friedens Wege gehn").

The hymn should not be confused with "O God Almighty Father", written by Irvin M. Udulutsch and published in 1959. That work is in four stanzas, and is not a translation of the German hymn. The refrain of his version begins "O most holy Trinity, undivided unity".
