= Christus, du Licht vom wahren Licht =

Catholic hymn

- Catholic hymn
- Text: paraphrase of "Summi parentis unica"
- Language: German
- Composed: 1548

"Christus, du Licht vom wahren Licht" (Christ, you light from true light) is a Catholic hymn in German, a paraphrase of the medieval Latin hymn "Summi parentis unica". It is a song about the apostles. In the common Catholic hymnal in German, Gotteslob, it is GL 546. The text was adapted in Münsterschwarzach Abbey, to a 1548 melody by Johann Leisentritt, revised by Erhard Quack in 1941.
