= Bleibe bei uns, du Wandrer durch die Zeit =

Contemporary Christian hymn

- Catholic hymn
- Text: by Peter Gerloff
- Language: German
- Based on: Road to Emmaus appearance
- Melody: by William Henry Monk
- Composed: 1861

"Bleibe bei uns, du Wandrer durch die Zeit" (Abide with us, you wanderer through time) is a Christian hymn with text by Peter Gerloff to a melody by William Henry Monk. The song, based on the biblical Road to Emmaus appearance, was included in the Catholic hymnal Gotteslob.

== History ==
The text was written by Peter Gerloff, a Catholic priest, expanding the story from the Gospel of Luke (24:13–35) about two disciples who walk to Emmaus after the death of Jesus. It uses a popular 1861 melody by William Henry Monk, "Eventide", which is used for several hymns in English, notably the 1847 hymn "Abide with Me" by Henry Francis Lyte.

The song has three stanzas of four lines each, from the position of one of the disciples. In the first stanza, the singer addresses the "Wandrer durch die Zeit" (wanderer through time) to stay with them, be their guest and share bread and wine. The second stanza expands their situation, having run away from the Cross, and remembering that their hearts burnt when he spoke to them. The third stanza requests: "initiate us fully into your mystery" when facing death, concluding "in life and death we abide in you".

The hymn was included in the German Catholic hymnal Gotteslob in 2013 as GL 325, in the section Ostern (Easter). It is the only song in the hymnal that is exclusively based on the Emmaus story.
