= Du hast mein Klagen in Tanzen verwandelt =

- Christian hymn
- English: "Thou hast turned for me my mourning into dancing"
- Occasion: Easter
- Language: German
- Based on: Psalm 30:11–12
- Melody: by Johannes Falk
- Composed: 1990s
- Published: 2013

"Du hast mein Klagen in Tanzen verwandelt" ("Thou hast turned for me my mourning into dancing") is a Christian hymn in German with text taken from Psalm 30:11–12 and a melody composed in the 1990s by Johannes Falk. The song is part of the Gotteslob and of songbooks.

== History ==
The text of the hymn "Du hast mein Klagen in Tanzen verwandelt" is taken from Psalm 30. The melody was created by Johannes Falk, a church musician from Freiburg born in 1963, in the 1990s.

The two verses from Psalm 30 form four lines that the KJV renders as

Thou hast turned for me my mourning into dancing:
thou hast put off my sackcloth, and girded me with gladness;
To the end that my glory may sing praise to thee, and not be silent. O LORD my God,
I will give thanks unto thee for ever."

The topic is thankfulness for healing from a state of lament and mourning to dancing and singing. The melody expresses the transformation, which is attributed to God, by rising lines and surprising modulations. It begins in low register in E minor, reaches a climax in D major and ends in G major. It has a dance-like character in common time and stresses the word "Freude" (joy) by a triplet.

The hymn appeared in the current 2013 Catholic hymnal in German, Gotteslob, as GL 323. The song is included among the Easter hymns, but can be sung generally in different situations all year. It is contained in songbooks.
