= Wenn das Brot, das wir teilen =

Christian hymn

- Christian hymn
- English: When the bread that we share
- Occasion: 750th anniversary of death of St. Elisabeth
- Text: by Claus-Peter März
- Language: German
- Based on: Miracle of the Roses
- Melody: by Kurt Grahl
- Composed: 1981

"Wenn das Brot, das wir teilen" (When the bread that we share) is a Christian hymn, with a text written in 1981 by Claus-Peter März, and a melody by Kurt Grahl. It was written to commemorate St. Elisabeth, and begins with a reference to her Miracle of the Roses. The song, of the genre Neues Geistliches Lied (NGL), is part of German hymnals, including Evangelisches Gesangbuch and Gotteslob, and of songbooks.

== History ==
The Roman Catholic theologian Claus-Peter März from Erfurt wrote the text of "Wenn das Brot, das wir teilen" in 1981, on the occasion of the 750th anniversary of death of St. Elisabeth who is venerated especially in Thuringia. The text begins with a reference to the saint's Miracle of the Roses. The church musician Kurt Grahl from Leipzig composed the melody the same year for a youth pilgrimage from Leipzig to places where she was active. A year later, the song was featured at the Katholikentag convention in Düsseldorf, and was then included in many song collections.

The song became part of both the Protestant and the Catholic common hymnals. It was included in some regional editions of Evangelisches Gesangbuch. It was included in the Gotteslob of 2013 as GL 470, in the section "Gesänge – Schöpfung: Gerechtigkeit und Friede" (Chants – Life in the world: justice and peace). The song is also part of several songbooks, including collections for young people and ecumenical songbooks.

== Text and music ==
The hymn is in five stanzas with a short strophe of two lines, and a long refrain of four lines with the last one repeated. It is written in the first person plural, speaking in the first stanza of the bread that we share, and in the second of the suffering of the poor that we change, according to Matthew 25:40. The third stanza begins with the hand that we hold, the fourth stanza with the consolation that we give, and in the final stanza of our suffering and death carrying us forward. Each time, the idea is that giving and sharing is also good for the giver.

The refrain reflects the images of God's tent among people, and seeing him from face to face, from the Book of Revelation. The key point of the text is that this happens already now each time that we love our neighbours.
