= Zeige uns, Herr, deine Allmacht und Güte =

- Christian hymn
- English: Show us, Lord, your might and goodness
- Occasion: Lent
- Written: 1982
- Text: Raymund Weber
- Language: German
- Melody: Hymnal by Johann Anastasius Freylinghausen
- Composed: 1708
- Published: 2013

"Zeige uns, Herr, deine Allmacht und Güte" (Show us, Lord, your might and goodness) is a Christian hymn of penitence. The lyrics were written in the early 1980s by Raymund Weber. They were combined with a melody from the 1708 hymnal by Johann Anastasius Freylinghausen. The song in three stanzas appeared in the 2013 Catholic hymnal Gotteslob as GL 272 in the section for Lent.

== History ==
The lyrics were written, beginning around 1980, by Raymund Weber, a Germanist and theologian who was inspired by the changes of the Second Vatican Council. He began by translating a Swedish song by Joel Rundt, but ended writing his own wording for the Swedish melody.

When his song was considered for inclusion in the Catholic hymnal Gotteslob, the Swedish melody was dropped in favour of a Baroque melody from the 1708 hymnal by Johann Anastasius Freylinghausen. It appeared in the Gotteslob in the second edition in 2013 as GL 272, in the section for Lent, the time of penitence and fasting before Easter (Österliche Bußzeit – Fastenzeit). It was also included in the songbook Das Liederbuch / Lieder zwischen Himmel und Erde.

== Text ==
Weber wrote three stanzas of six lines each, rhyming ababcc. The first stanza is a prayer, for the ability to experience God's might and goodness, and to receive the fire of the Holy Spirit to turn away the anxiety in us. In the second stanza, the singers realize themselves as tools of God's promise (Werkzeuge deiner Verheißung), and request to be able to act motivated by faith and love. They begin the third stanza: "Call us to turning whenever we fail" (Ruf uns zur Umkehr, sooft wir versagen). They address God as the answer to desperate questions (Antwort bist du in verzweifelten Fragen), and request to be taught forgiveness, trust and patience. Finally the sacrifice of Jesus is mentioned as a model in both words and deeds.

== Melody ==
The Baroque melody from the 1708 hymnal is unusual for a hymn, in triple time and with several melismata. It is a bar form in E minor, beginning with an expressive cruciform melody (E D♯ G F♯) of narrow intervals and a leap.

The conclusion (Abgesang) contains the beginning in reverse (Umkehrung), a musical image for Umkehr or repentance. Never touching the ground key on a line's end, the melody softens only towards the end.
