= Ist das der Leib, Herr Jesu Christ =

Christian hymns in German

- Easter hymn
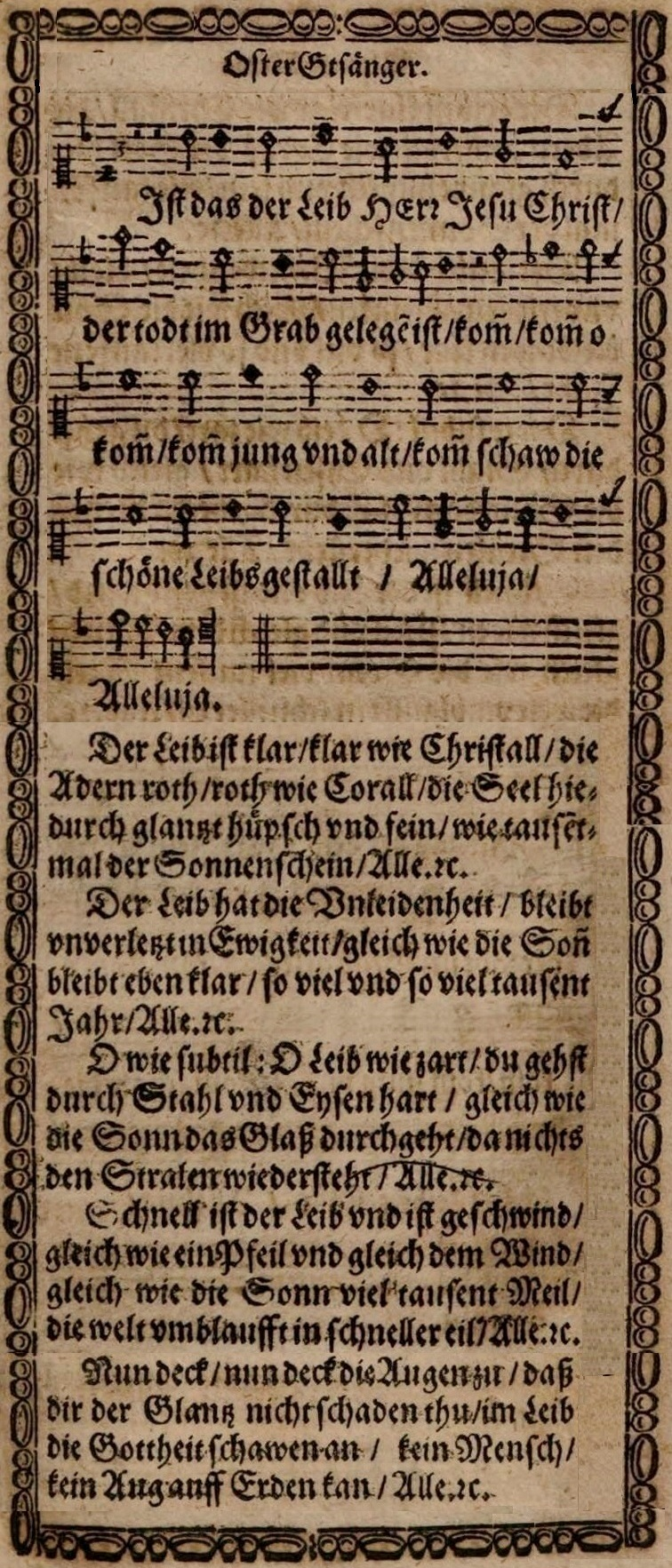
- The hymn in a 1630 hymnal
- English: Is this the body, Lord Jesus Christ
- Text: by Friedrich Spee
- Language: German
- Melody: from Würzburg
- Composed: 1628
- Published: 1623

"Ist das der Leib, Herr Jesu Christ" (Is this the body, Lord Jesus Christ) is Catholic Easter hymn in German. The text was written by Friedrich Spee, first published in 1623. The song is still part of hymnals.

== History ==
Friedrich Spee wrote the text of "Ist das der Leib, Herr Jesu Christ" in the 17th century, first published in 1623 in Cologne in the collection Auserlesene Catholische Geistliche Kirchengesäng. A tune was written for it by an unknown composer, first published in 1628.

The hymn was contained in regional sections in the first edition of the Catholic hymnal Gotteslob. In the 2013 second edition it became part of the common section as GL 331. It is also contained in other hymnals.
