= Herr, du bist mein Leben =

Christian hymn

- Christian hymn
- English: Lord, You are my life
- Written: 1978
- Text: by Pierangelo Sequeri, translated by Christoph Biskupek
- Language: German
- Based on: "Tu sei la mia vita"
- Melody: by Pierangelo Sequeri
- Composed: 1977
- Published: 2013

"Herr, du bist mein Leben" (Lord, You are my life) is a Christian hymn in German, the translation of an Italian hymn by Pierangelo Sequeri from 1977. The hymn of the genre Neues Geistliches Lied (NGL) appears in the 2013 hymnal Gotteslob, and in other songbooks. It is both a confession of faith and a song of encouragement.

== History ==
The Italian theologian Pierangelo Sequeri wrote in 1977 text and tune of a hymn in Italian, "Tu sei la mia vita" which he titled Symbolum (Confession). It became popular in Italy. The song is in four stanzas.

The hymn was translated in 1978 to German by Christoph Biskupek, a priest. Later, it was included in the German common Catholic hymnal Gotteslob as GL 456, in the section Sendung und Nachfolge (mission and following). Subsequently, in 2014, Reinhard Hauke, a bishop of Erfurt, made the song the focus of a sermon, introducing the then new hymnal. He mentioned singing together as a stronger confession of faith than one person reciting. The hymn is also contained in other songbooks.

== Text and theme ==
The text of the song, in four stanzas of six lines each, alludes to Jesus saying that he is the way, the truth, and the life (John 14:6). In the German version, it does not rhyme. The first stanza is written in the first person, declaring that the singer supports the view. The second stanza is focused on the way of Jesus through death to life, and opens the view to a group, beginning saying "das sagt uns dein Wort" (Your word tells us that). The third stanza returns to the relation of the singer to Jesus, identifying him with freedom, strength, giving peace and courage.

The belief of the group in the Trinity is expressed in a condensed form at the beginning of the fourth stanza: "Vater unsres Lebens, wir vertrauen dir, Jesus, unser Retter, an dich glauben wir, und du Geist der Liebe, atme du in uns" (Father of our life, we trust in you, Jesus, our Saviour, we believe in you, and you, Spirit of love, breathe in us). The last line is a simple prayer: "Mache uns zu Boten deiner Liebe" (Make us messengers of your love).

== Melody ==
The melody in E minor shows a regular pattern of phrases beginning with four eighth-notes, followed by either two quarters in the middle of a line, and a half-note at the end of the line. The third line begins in a higher register, and is repeated in the fifth. The fourth line is longer than the others and set in continuous eighths in an upward motion. The final line is similar but follows the original pattern.
