= Dieser Tag ist Christus eigen =

Contemporary Christian hymn

- Catholic hymn
- Written: 2004
- Text: by Peter Gerloff
- Language: German
- Melody: by Gilbert König
- Composed: 1939

"Dieser Tag ist Christus eigen" (This day belongs to Christ) is a Christian hymn with text by Peter Gerloff, written in 2004, to a 1939 melody by Gilbert König. The song was included in the Catholic hymnal Gotteslob.

== History ==
The text was written by Peter Gerloff in 2004, focused on the Sunday as a day of rest as described in the Genesis narration of the Creation, and as day of memory of the resurrection of Jesus.

The song has three stanzas of four lines each. It was written to a 1939 melody by Gilbert König. The hymn was included in the German Catholic hymnal Gotteslob in 2013 as GL 103, in the section Sonntag (Sunday).
