= Freu dich, erlöste Christenheit =

Catholic hymn for Easter

- German Catholic Easter hymn
- English: Be joyful, redeemed Christianity
- Written: 1787 to 1881
- Text: different sources for stanzas
- Language: German
- Melody: from Limburg
- Composed: 1838
- Published: 1777

"Freu dich, erlöste Christenheit" (German for 'Be joyful, redeemed Christianity') is a Catholic hymn in German for Easter. Its seven stanzas come from different regional traditions, while the melody was published in Limburg in 1838. It became part of the Catholic hymnal in German, Gotteslob, and other songbooks.

== History ==
"Freu dich, erlöste Christenheit" is a traditional Easter hymn without known authors or composers. The melody appeared in Limburg in 1838. Each stanza has several fixed elements, leaving only two lines for new content in the stanzas. The first two stanzas come from Mainz where they appeared in 1787, the following two from Paderborn (1868), the next two from Regensburg (1881), and the origin of the final stanza is unknown. The melody was published in Limburg in 1838. The first two stanzas appeared in the 1975 first edition of the Gotteslob as GL 829. The combined seven stanzas became part of the Catholic hymnal in German, Gotteslob as GL 327, and of other songbooks.

== Text ==
The text of the first stanza is:

Freu dich, erlöste Christenheit,
freu dich und singe!
Der Heiland ist erstanden heut,
Halleluja!
Sing fröhlich: Halleluja!

Of these five lines, only the first and third change. The first stanza calls Christianity to be joyful of redemption and sing, because the Saviour (Jesus) is risen today, followed by Halleluja and another call to sing merrily: Halleluja. The second stanza mentions three days in the grave and breaking the bonds of death.

The third and fourth stanzas reflects the wounds, transformed to a gate to Heaven. The fifth stanzas deals with the hope for the Christian to also rise from the grave. The sixths stanza considers the wheat seed that does not rot although it dies in the soil. The final stanza is a promise to see the Saviour forever.

The melody in B major and common time matches the call to joy, in steady steps with only three longer notes at the end of the second, fourth and fifth line, and mostly in high register.
