= Ein Bote kommt, der Heil verheißt =

Contemporary Christian hymn

- Catholic hymn
- Written: 2010
- Text: by Peter Gerloff
- Language: German
- Composed: 1529
- Published: 2013

"Ein Bote kommt, der Heil verheißt" (A messenger comes to announce salvation) is a Christian hymn with text Peter Gerloff, written in 2010 to match a 1529 well-known melody from Wittenberg. The Marian song that deals with the Annunciation was included in the Catholic hymnal Gotteslob in 2013.

== History ==
The text od "Ein Bote kommt, der Heil verheißt" was written by Peter Gerloff in 2010 for the topic of the Annunciation of Gabriel to Mary, as narrated in the Gospel of Luke. The scene is depicted in many works of art. In a poem by Rainer Maria Rilke both tha angel as the girl are frightened.

The song has three stanzas of seven lines each in a bar form. It is sung to the tune of Luther's "Lobpreiset all zu dieser Zeit", published in 1529 in Wittenberg. This melody is also sung with other songs for Advent and Christmas including the melody of "Ich steh an deiner Krippen hier" that Bach used as a chorale in Part 59 of his Christmas Oratorio. The song was included in the German Catholic hymnal Gotteslob in 2013 as GL 528, in the section Maria. It is used as an Advent song.
