= Eine große Stadt ersteht =

German Catholic hymn

- German Catholic hymn
- English: A large city arises
- Written: 1965
- Text: by Silja Walter
- Language: German
- Melody: Josef Anton Saladin
- Composed: 1972
- Published: 1876

"Eine große Stadt ersteht" (A large city arises) is a German Catholic hymn, frequently sung for the consecration of churches (Kirchweihe) and their anniversaries. The text in three stanzas was written by Silja Walter and the melody was composed by Josef Anton Saladin in 1972. It became part of German Catholic hymnals Gotteslob.

== History ==
Silja Walter, who entered a Benedictine monastery in 1948, wrote "Eine große Stadt ersteht" in 1965. Josef Anton Saladin composed the melody in 1972. It was included in the first Catholic hymnal in German, Gotteslob of 1975, as GL 642, and retained in the second edition as GL 479.

== Theme ==
The three stanzas of "Eine große Stadt ersteht" express praise, prayer and thanks. They refer to passages from Revelation 21, describing the New Jerusalem and Mother church. The stanzas have six lines each, rhyming AABCCB.
