= Nimm, o Gott, die Gaben, die wir bringen =

2009 German-language hymn

- Christian hymn
- Occasion: Offertory
- Written: 2009
- Text: by Raymund Weber
- Language: German
- Melody: by Andrew Lloyd Webber
- Composed: 1970
- Published: 2013

"Nimm, o Gott, die Gaben, die wir bringen" (Accept, O God, the gifts we bring) is the beginning of a Christian offertory hymn with German text by Raymund Weber, and a melody that Andrew Lloyd Webber composed for his musical Jesus Christ Superstar. The song, of the genre Neues Geistliches Lied (NGL), is part of German hymnals, including Gotteslob. Two other songs use the same melody.

== History ==
Raymund Weber wrote the text of "Nimm, o Gott, die Gaben, die wir bringen" inspired by a melody by Andrew Lloyd Webber that he wrote for a scene, "The last supper", in the musical Jesus Christ Superstar. In this scene, the apostles show little understanding for what Jesus tells them about the Last Supper, but are concerned about their own role and fame in the future.

The hymn, in four stanzas of four lines each, is of the genre Neues Geistliches Lied (NGL). Weber wrote his text in the first person plural, from the perspective of a community. The first stanza reflects that the offering of bread and wine stand for the persons who bring them, in their failures and successes ("Scheitern und Gelingen"). In the second stanza, the believers remember that Jesus gave himself in bread and wine, and offer their life as thanks for it. In the third stanza, they ask that their hearts be transformed, as bread and wine are.

The song was included in the German Catholic hymnal Gotteslob as GL 188, in the section "Gesänge – Woche – Gesänge zur Gabenbereitung" (Chants – Week – chants for offertory). It was included along with other songs of the genre Neues Geistliches Lied. It is part of the songbook Unterwegs mit biblischen Liedern (On the road with biblical songs).

A song with a similar beginning, "Nimm o Herr die Gaben die wir bringen", was written to the same melody by an unknown author. It is part of several songbooks. Another song to the same melody, "Finden wir Verschiedene zusammen" (Find different [people] together), was written by Frieder Dehlinger, a Protestant pastor from Eislingen, in 2017. It is also focused on the Eucharist, especially as being celebrated following the instructions by Jesus.
