= Kloster Gnadenthal, Hesse =

Kloster Gnadenthal
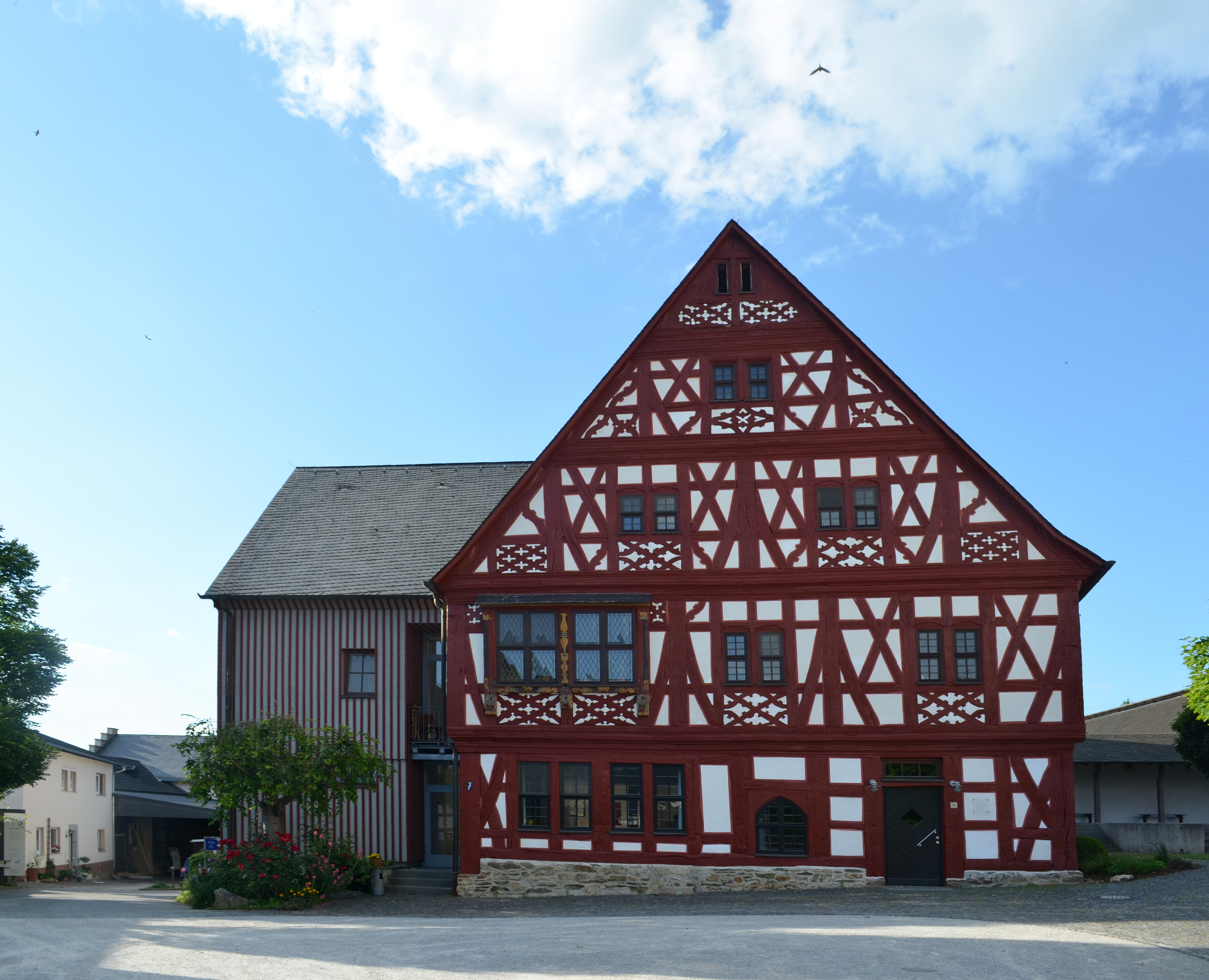
- Äbtissinnenhaus

- 50°18′33″N 8°12′55″E
- Location: Hünfelden, Hesse, Germany
- Denomination: Ecumenical
- Previous denomination: Catholic (Cistercians); Protestant
- Website: www.kloster-gnadenthal.de

History
- Founded: 1235

Architecture
- Heritage designation: Hague Convention

Kloster Gnadenthal is the name of a former Cistercian nunnery dating back to 1235 which was changed to a Protestant Stift for women in 1564, and became the centre of the ecumenical community Jesus-Bruderschaft (Jesus Brotherhood) in 1969. It is part of Hünfelden, Hesse, Germany.

== History ==
The nunnery dates back to 1235, then called in Latin "Vallis gratiae" (Valley of mercy). It was probably founded to house noble ladies, estimated around 50. From the 14th century, women from bourgeois families in Frankfurt and Limburg were also accepted. The nunnery had sheep, forests, a mill and workshops. The nunnery was associated with Marienstatt Abbey, from the end of the 14th century with Eberbach Abbey for around a century, then again with Marienstatt.

The economic situation of the nunnery deteriorated during the 15th century. In 1513, a reform was undertaken. In 1564, Gnadenthal became part of Nassau. The nuns now followed Protestant teaching and left the order, creating a Lutheran Stift for women (Damenstift).

Abbess Magdalena of Irmtraut had a new Äbtissinenhaus (abbess's house) built by Ludwig von Weilburg from 1589. The premises were destroyed in 1634 during the Thirty Years' War. After the war, the remaining buildings were used as an estate. Around 1705, Johann Georg Weitzel restored the church, but in more modest form. His successors used it as a stable.

In 1935, the estate was divided into eight farms. In 1969, the ecumenical community Jesus-Bruderschaft (Jesus Brotherhood) acquired part of the property and built new houses and the "Haus der Stille" (House of silence). Reconstruction of the historic buildings began in 1984. The community established church services including Stundengebet, regular services at certain times of each day. The community was awarded the Hessischer Denkmalschutzpreis in 1993 for its efforts to revitalize the village and monastery, and received the Umweltpreis of the Landkreis Limburg-Weilburg for ecological preservation in 1998. The buildings are listed historic buildings, since 2009 also according to the Hague Convention. The church is an official Radwegekirche on a bike route through the valleys of Emsbach and Wörsbach.

== Jesus Brotherhood ==
Gnadenthal has been the centre of the ecumenical community Jesus-Bruderschaft. Its members come from different churches and denominations, with which they retain their affiliation. The Jesus-Bruderschaft practices communal life for families and celibate members of both genders.

The community runs several companies, an agriculture operation following Bioland principles, a publishing house named Präsenz-Verlag, a book shop, an art gallery, and two guest houses, "Haus der Stille" (House of silence) and "Nehemia-Hof" (Nehemia farm).
