= Gerhard Tersteegen =

German Reformed religious writer and hymnist

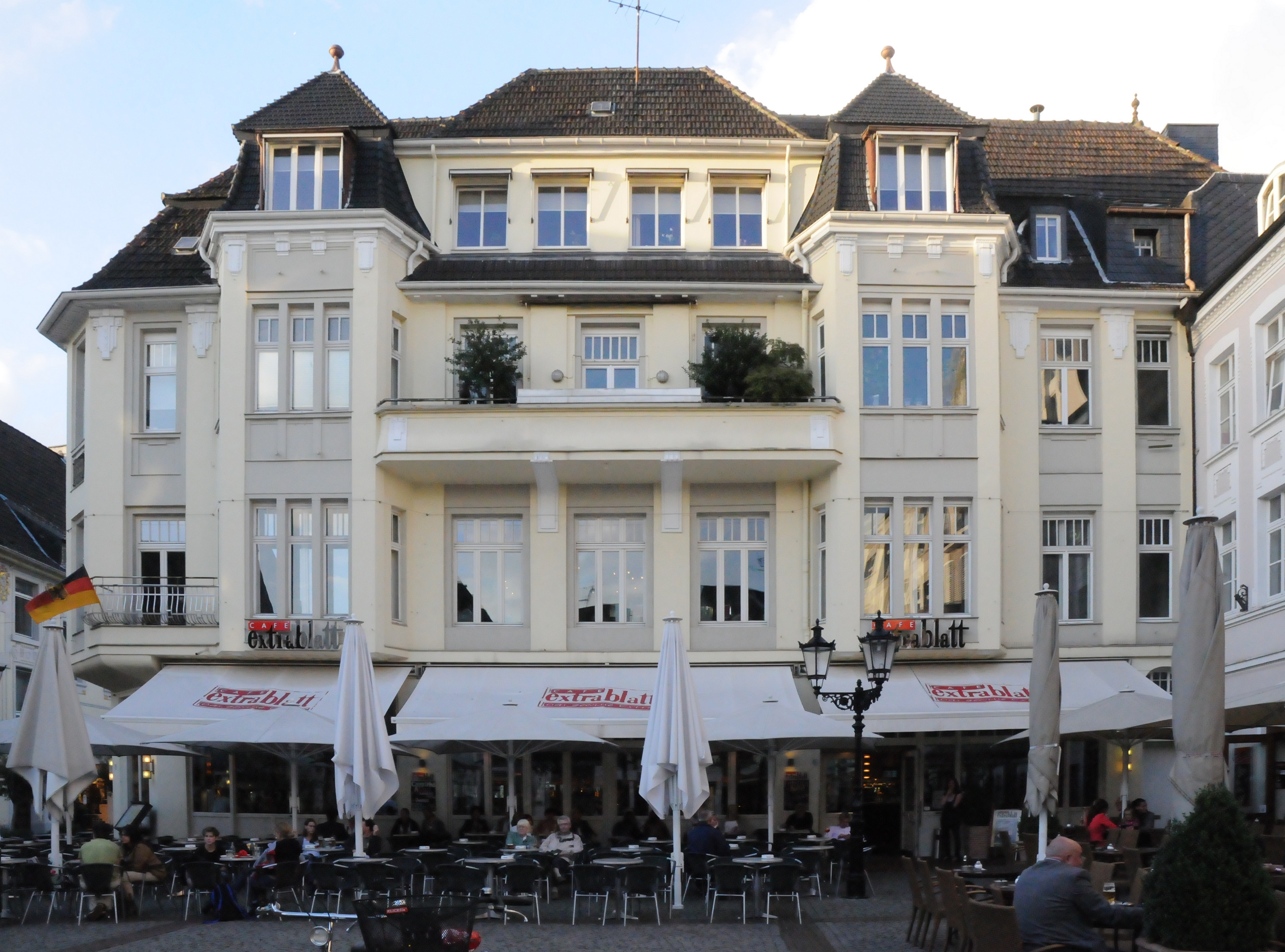
Tersteegen's birthplace in Moers

Gerhard Tersteegen (25 November 1697 – 3 April 1769) was a German Reformed religious writer and hymnist.

== Life ==
Tersteegen was born in Moers, at that time the principal city of a county belonging to the House of Orange-Nassau that formed a Protestant enclave in the midst of a Catholic country.

After being educated at the gymnasium of his native town, Tersteegen was for some years apprenticed to a merchant. He soon came under the influence of Wilhelm Hoffman, a Pietistic revivalist, and devoted himself to writing and public speaking, withdrawing in 1728 from all secular pursuits and giving himself entirely to religious work. He also had a great influence on radical Pietism.

His writings include a collection of hymns, such as Das geistliche Blumengärtlein (The spiritual flower-garden) of 1729 (new edition, Stuttgart, 1868), a volume of Gebete (prayers), and another of Briefe (letters), besides translations of the writings of the French mystics and of Julian of Norwich in his Auserlesene Lebensbeschreibungen Heiliger Seelen (”Selected Descriptions of Holy Souls”, 1733–1753, 3 volumes). He died in Mülheim, North Rhine-Westphalia.

== Sermons ==
Tersteegen was well known for his deeply spiritual sermons. People crowded into his home to hear him speak of the things of God. Some of his sermons have been translated into English, including Godliness, and Warnings and Admonitions. Additional sermons can be found in Samuel Jackson's Spiritual Crumbs from the Master's Table and H. E. Govan's Gerhard Tersteegen: Life and Selections.

== Poetry ==
Tersteegen's poetry has been regarded as spiritual. An example from his hymns:

Let Him lead thee blindfold onwards,
Love needs not to know;
Children whom the Father leadeth
Ask not where they go.
Though the path be all unknown
Over moors and mountains lone.

Give no ear to reason’s questions;
Let the blind man hold
That the sun is but a fable
Men believed of old.
At the breast the babe will grow;
Whence the milk he need not know.

== Hymns ==
Hymns by Tersteegen were printed in several hymnals internationally, for example in the Danish Roskilde Konvents Psalmebog 1855, and later in Psalmebog 1912, with one hymn, "Kom, lad trøstig vandre" (No. 564).

In Sweden, a popular songbook with spiritual songs and prayers by Thomas à Kempis named Lilla Kempis. Korta Språk och Böner, till uppbyggelse för de enfaldiga (4th edition 1876) contained 19 hymns by Tersteegen.

In The Church Hymn book 1872 he is represented with four hymns: "God calling yet" ("Gott rufet noch", 1730, No. 655), "Thou hidden love of God" ("Verborgne Gottesliebe, Du", 1731 No. 744), "Something every heart is loving" (1730, No. 782) and "O thou, to whose all-searching sight" (1731, No. 927).

In The English Hymnal with Tunes, 1933, he is represented with the procession hymn "Gott ist gegenwärtig", in the English translation by John Wesley as "Lo! God is here!" (No. 637). Wesley translated several of Tersteegen's texts.

== Correspondence ==
Tersteegen corresponded with many people. He was always practical and sought to help people learn how to live in God's presence. Among the more fundamental principles he espoused were the following:

"The Christian ought to form an invincible resolution to become as perfect as possible, and take the life and doctrine of the Saviour as his pattern."

"The means for this purpose are, walking before God - that is, a constant introversion and inwardness, so that the attention is continually directed to that which passes in the soul, and every inclination not acceptable to God is stifled at birth."

"With this exercise, unceasing or inward prayer must be connected, which consists in a continued inclination to, and an habitual dependence upon, God, even in the smallest matters."

"All this must be practiced in a state of constant tranquility and inward humiliation before God."

"In order to render it easy, the individual must seek solitude and retirement as much as is consistent with his outward calling."

== Reflections ==
Here are samples of his reflections:

Regarding God's presence:
"The secret of God’s presence is actually believed by very few, but are you aware, that if each one truly believed it, the whole world would at once be filled with the saints, and the earth would be truly Paradise? If men really believed it as they should, they would need nothing more to induce them to give themselves up, heart and soul, to this loving God. But now it is hid from their eyes. Let us pray, my beloved, that God may be made known and manifested to many hearts, and thus in the light of His divine presence, the darkness of mere human life may be dispelled, and all things cast away, both without and within the heart, which hinder the growth and life of the soul, and which this light alone discovers and unveils. In all Christian practice there is nothing more universally needful, nothing simpler, sweeter, and more useful, nothing which so sums up in itself all Christian duties in one blessed act, as the realization of the loving presence of God."

On spiritual advancement:
"I record with deep sorrow the fact that, in our days, in the case of newly converted souls, the necessity of advance and pressing forward in holiness of life is not sufficiently insisted upon, whereas the Scripture is so clear and full upon this subject. In the Scripture we find that holiness includes a real and actual cleansing from sin and pollution, in the renewing of the inner man, in a changing from glory to glory after the image of Him who created us, in conformity to Jesus Christ. Let us seek after all these things, praying earnestly, and withdrawing ourselves into the seclusion of the inner sanctuary of communion with God, Who is so inexpressibly near to us, Who desires, by the power of the resurrection of Christ, by the Spirit of holiness, to sanctify us wholly, to work by us, to live, and move in us."

On the work of the Spirit:
"When the Spirit enters into the heart, He fills it entirely, so that the world finds no more room or place in it, because this Guest makes Himself sole Lord and Master of it. The first disciples and believers were so entirely taken possession of by this blissful dominion of the Pentecostal Spirit that they were no longer masters of their own tongues or any other member. They were compelled, as it were, to speak, even as the Spirit gave them utterance. They could not long speak according to their own judgment, knowledge, and learning. No! They were constrained to do and speak as the Holy Spirit would have them. Thus it is with every one with whom the Holy Spirit takes up His residence. He then experiences the blissful dominion of our Lord Jesus Christ in his heart. The Holy Spirit is then the scepter which is sent forth out of Zion into our hearts. He takes possession of all our will and desire, all our actions and deportment, all our inclinations and affections and makes us entirely subject to Him. He dwells in our hearts like a king in the realm of his palace. He ordains and accomplishes in us that which is pleasing and acceptable to Him. He creates in us another principle and beginning of life. He becomes to the soul, as it were, the life of her life. He renews her daily more and more in the image of Him that created her, and forms her into a temple of truth and righteousness—yea, to a living temple of God in Jesus Christ. All the glory of earthly kings and princes are only vain shadows and child’s-play compared with the single Pentecostal heart which is deemed worthy of receiving the Spirit of Jesus Christ in such plenitude."

Tersteegen was ever hopeful of God's favor, as attested in the following:

"This inestimable favour and honour is not only earnestly desired for you by me, but is kindly intended for and graciously offered by Jesus Himself to the most wretched amongst you. Could we, who are deserving of the curse, behold even only through a fissure the opened heart of Jesus, what should we not see! What should we not feel!

As long as we lived in a state of carnal security, without God and without Jesus, we stood on the brink of perdition's yawning gulf, and were unconscious of it. Jesus loved us, sought us, and we knew it not. It is He that hath taken us by the hand, that hath drawn us away from that dreadful abyss, that hath directed our minds to Himself, and, instead of the well-deserved pit of hell, hath opened unto us the unfathomable abyss of His loving heart, in order that we may fly to this safe and blessed city of refuge from all sin and danger, and become eternally happy in Him. Oh, come, my dear brethren! Taste and see how gracious the Lord is, and how unspeakably blessed we may be in communion with Him, even during the present state of existence! Seek nowhere else alleviation for your burdened hearts. All besides is deception. You will not find it out of Christ, but only be adding to your burden by seeking it elsewhere.

He that abhors all his sins, has a right to believe that he has the forgiveness of all his sins and cleansing from them in the blood of Christ; but he that wishes to receive Christ, and yet secretly retain both the world and sin, his faith is vain. He that gives all for all, shall certainly obtain the pearl of great price; but how can a person receive anything whose hands are already full! Do not console yourselves on unsubstantial grounds, till Jesus consoles you in His due time, lest you be injured by it." (H. E. Govan, Gerhard Tersteegen Life and Selections, (London: James Nisbet, 1898), pp. 86, 87.)

He also recognized that blessings come packaged as trials:

"Be willing to occupy the lowest place, till the Lord Himself says, 'Friend, come up hither' (Luke xiv.). Only wait at Jesus' feet, ye troubled hearts—no one waits in vain; for whilst we wait, the precious corn groweth up. We are not so happy in the world, when all things go well with us, as we are with Jesus in troublous times. Every tear and every sigh will bring, in due time, abundant fruit. Learn to keep Lent with Jesus. Be not disquieted, dejected, or faint-hearted, when sufferings, trials, and temptations arise. We ought rather to fortify our hearts with confidence when these things befall us, even as they happened to our great Forerunner." (Ibid., pp. 87,88)

Tersteegen was adamant that all spiritual growth and joy was centered in a relationship with Jesus Christ. He also realized that understanding and coming into a relationship with Christ was progressive in nature, as delineated in the following:

"The assurance of the forgiveness of sins is commonly taken for believing in Jesus; but in my opinion this is incorrect. That which I have more fitly called the drawing of the Father, I might also with propriety call believing in Jesus; for the Father draws us to the Son. But faith in Christ has its gradations. In the beginning it is a coming to Jesus (John 6:35); that is, with hunger and desire. It is afterwards a receiving of Jesus (John 1:12), which cannot take place unless the sincere will of the soul lets go at once the world, sin, and self. In advancing, faith is an abiding in Jesus (John 15), namely, with a fervent inclination, otherwise called retiring within or cleaving to Him (1 Cor. 6:17); and thus, by abiding and walking in Jesus, we are increasingly rooted and grounded in Him (Col 2:7), which, however, is not accomplished without affliction and trials. Faith is, finally, a dwelling of Christ in the soul, and of the soul in Christ (Eph. 3:17); John 17:23), and a becoming one with Him. By referring to and considering the passages quoted, you may perhaps attain more light on the subject." (Ibid., pp. 84, 85)

== Publications ==
- Gerhard Tersteegen, Briefe. Unter Mitarbeit von Ulrich Bister (†) und Klaus vom Orde. Hg. v. Gustav Adolf Benrath. Bde. 1-2 (Göttingen, Vandenhoeck & Ruprecht, 2008), 1268 S. (Texte zur Geschichte des Pietismus, Abteilung V, Band 7).
- Johannes Burkardt: Gerhard Tersteegen. Die Bernières-Louvigny-Übersetzungen. (=Siegener Beiträge zur Reformierten Theologie und Pietismusforschung Bd. 5). Luther-Verlag, Bielefeld 2023.
