= Pierangelo Sequeri =

Italian theologian

- Dean of the John Paul II Pontifical Theological Institute for Marriage and Family Sciences
- Diocese: Diocese of Rome

Orders
- Ordination: 28 June 1968

Personal details
- Born: 26 December 1944 (age 81) Milan, Italy
- Denomination: Catholic
- Education: Pontifical Gregorian University

Pierangelo Sequeri (born 26 December 1944) is an Italian theologian of the Catholic Church who has been dean of the John Paul II Pontifical Theological Institute for Marriage and Family Sciences since August 2016. He is also a writer, and a composer who wrote hymns and other music. He held posts as professor of philosophy and theology at the Major Seminary in Milan, doctor and musicologist of the Biblioteca Ambrosiana, and lecturer in the aesthetics of the sacred at the Academy of Fine Arts of Brera. He was professor of fundamental theology at the Theological Faculty of Northern Italy, later its dean. He has held several papal appointments.

== Biography ==
Pierangelo Sequeri was born on 26 December 1944 in Milan. His parents were both musicians. He was ordained a priest of the Archdiocese of Milan on 28 June 1968. He obtained a doctorate in theology at the Pontifical Gregorian University in 1972.

He was professor of philosophy and theology at the Major Seminary in Milan, doctor and musicologist of the Biblioteca Ambrosiana, and lecturer in the aesthetics of the sacred at the Academy of Fine Arts of Brera. He became the professor of fundamental theology at the Theological Faculty of Northern Italy. In September 2012 he became dean of the Theological Faculty of Northern Italy. He has also been a visiting professor at a number of universities. His writings include numerous books and articles, some academic and some more popular in style, on issues of institutional, philosophical and theological education as well as the relationship between cultural anthropology and religious experience. He has been a columnist for Avvenire and worked with L'Osservatore Romano.

On 25 July 2009, Pope Benedict XVI named him a member of the International Theological Commission. (Note: He was confirmed in that position by Pope Francis on 23 September 2014.) On 19 May 2011, Benedict consultor to the Pontifical Commission for the Promotion of the New Evangelization. On 22 September 2012, Pope Benedict named him a special auditor for the October 2012 Synod of Bishops on the New Evangelization. For 2015 Synod on the Family Pope Francis named him a collaborator of the Synod's Special Secretary. From 2010 to 2014 he was a member of the International Commission of Inquiry on Medjugorje.

On 17 August 2016, Pope Francis appointed him dean (preside) of the John Paul II Pontifical Theological Institute for Marriage and Family Sciences. Modifications Pope Francis made to the institute's mission in 2017 and the removal of some longtime faculty resulted in a public debate about the changes. Sequeri justified the changes as a continuous development of John Paul's mandate in response to societal developments. He said that the dispute represented "moves in another battle", that is, the discontent of some in the Church with Francis' approach I general, and were not really about the institute. He said the changes embodied "the continuity of the magisterium", an attempt to broaden the discussion from sexuality to affective relations more generally: "sexuality also has a dramatic dimension. A dimension that cannot be reduced to sin alone, but which is also the effect of the contradictions of life, of errors, of pressures weighing on the family and disintegrating it.... Today, the Christian conscience has become a little more responsible, fortunately. It is not enough to prohibit, it is about learning to govern your sexuality. This requires choices, morality, an ethic of sexuality that must be filled with positive content, not just limits and prohibitions."

On 6 October 2018, Francis named him a consultor to the Dicastery for the Laity, Family and Life.

=== Musical interests ===
Early in his career, while studying theology, he also obtained a music librarian's diploma in at the University of Urbino.

Sequeri composed the Symbolum, a series of songs on religious themes in a sentimental style. They are often performed during Mass in Italy. His classical compositions include the Quintetto per David; Bethania, a sonata for violin and piano; and the Jubilee Mass, for choir and orchestra, broadcast on World Vision on 3 December 2000. He collaborated with the musical group Gen Verde, an international all-women band associated with the Focolare Movement, on the album "Il Mistero Pasquale" that was released in 2011.

He has also been director of the magazine L'ErbaMusica, a quarterly devoted to special pedagogy and musical culture.

In 1985 Sequeri developed a special music education program, called "orchestral music therapy", for children and young people with mental difficulties. The method consists of instrumental music practice and extends to inserting people into chamber or symphonic musical groups, which present public concerts using specially simplified scores.

== Writings ==
His published works include:

Academic texts

- Il Dio affidabile. Saggio di teologia fondamentale, Queriniana, Brescia 2000, (1996);
- L'idea della fede. Trattato di teologia fondamentale, Glossa, Milano, 2002.

Theology and spiritual formation

- Ma che cos'è questo per tanta gente?, Glossa, Milano 1998;
- Il timore di Dio, Vita e Pensiero, Milano 2009, (1997);
- Senza volgersi indietro, Vita e Pensiero, Milano 2000;
- Sensibili allo spirito. Umanesimo e religione, Glossa, Milano 2001;
- La qualità spirituale, Piemme, Casale Monferrato 2001;
- L'umano alla prova. Soggetto, identità, limite, Vita e Pensiero, Milano 2002;
- Non ultima è la morte. La libertà di credere nel risorto, Glossa, Milano 2006;
- L'ombra di Pietro. Legami buoni e altre beatitudini, Vita e Pensiero, Milano 2006;
- Nominare Dio invano? Orizzonti per la teologia filosofica, Glossa, Milano 2009;
- L'oro e la paglia. Meditazioni sull'educare alla scuola della parola di Dio, Glossa, Milano 2009, (1989).
- Beati i misericordiosi, perché troveranno misericordia, Lindau, 2012.

Music and aesthetics

- Divertimenti per Dio. Mozart e i teologi, Piemme, Casale Monferrato 1990 (con A. Torno);
- Estetica e teologia, Glossa, Milano 1991;
- Antiprometeo. Il teologico e il musicale, Glossa, Milano 1995;
- L'estro di Dio. Saggi di estetica, Glossa, Milano 2000;
- Musica e mistica. Percorsi nella storia occidentale delle pratiche estetiche e religiose, Libreria editrice Vaticana, Città del Vaticano 2005.
- Eccetto Mozart. Una passione teologica, Glossa, Milano 2006;
- Il sublime della risonanza. L'idea spirituale della musica in Occidente, Studium, 2008.
- Il sensibile e l'inatteso. Lezioni di estetica teologica, Queriniana, 2016.
