= Hans Georg Nägeli =

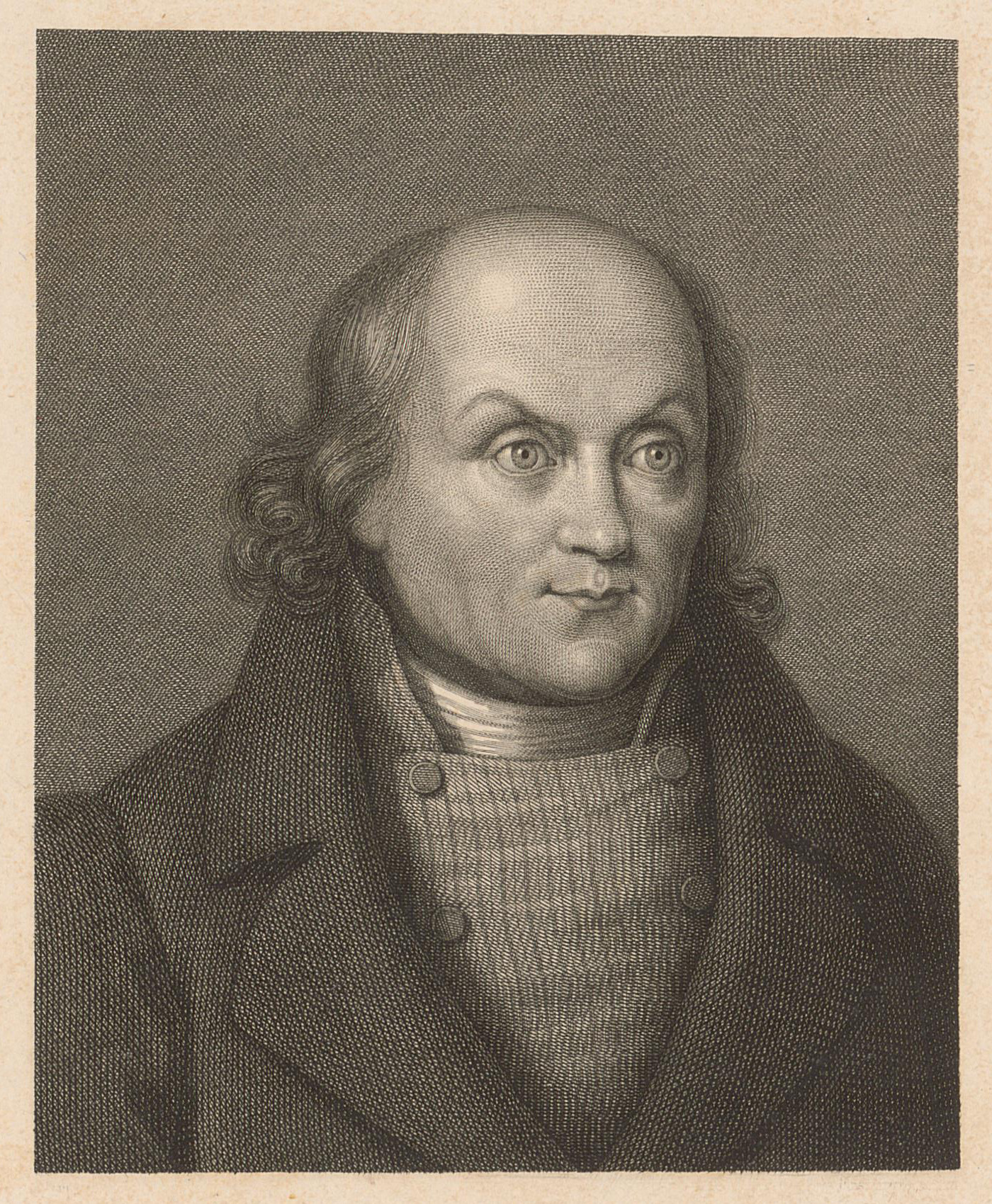
Hans Georg Nägeli, engraving by Martin Esslinger, 1838

Hans Georg Nägeli (26 May 1773 – 26 December 1836) was a composer and music publisher.

Nägeli was born in Wetzikon, Switzerland. He studied under his father as a child and then opened a private music shop and publishing firm in the 1790s. In 1803 he began publishing the Repertoire des Clavecinistes, which included the first editions of keyboard pieces by composers such as Muzio Clementi, Johann Baptist Cramer, and Ludwig van Beethoven. He founded two singing societies (Sängervereine) in Zurich, in addition to writing profusely on music theory and aesthetics, as well as introductory treatises for students. He died in Zurich in 1836.

Much of Nägeli's compositional output consists of keyboard works and songs. His "Gold'ne Abendsonne" (1815) was adapted by others for various purposes. One version of the tune, sung by a bird (feathered) on Today, was described by its presenters as a "Folk Song", but also appears in various music editions of the Metrical psalter (as the tune "Zurich"), where it is correctly attributed to Nägeli.

Nowadays he is probably best known for the hymn (and psalm) tune Dennis.

== Sources ==
- Don Randel, The Harvard Biographical Dictionary of Music. Harvard, 1996, p. 627.
