= Evangelisches Gesangbuch =

German language hymn book

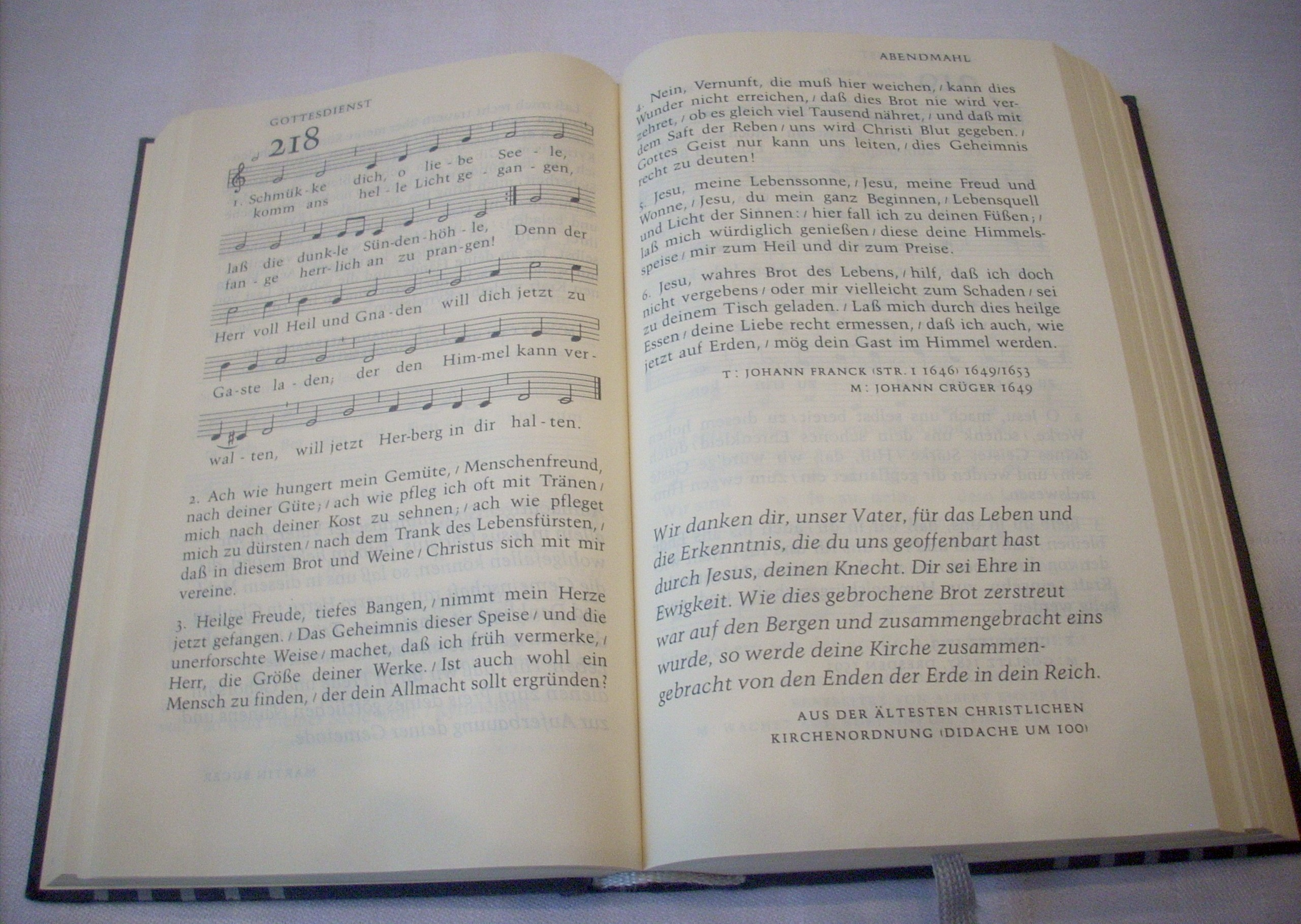
- Layout of the current German Protestant hymnal, showing "Schmücke dich, o liebe Seele", a hymn by Johann Franck and Johann Crüger, as EG 218
- Language: German
- Genre: Protestant hymnal
- Published: 1993

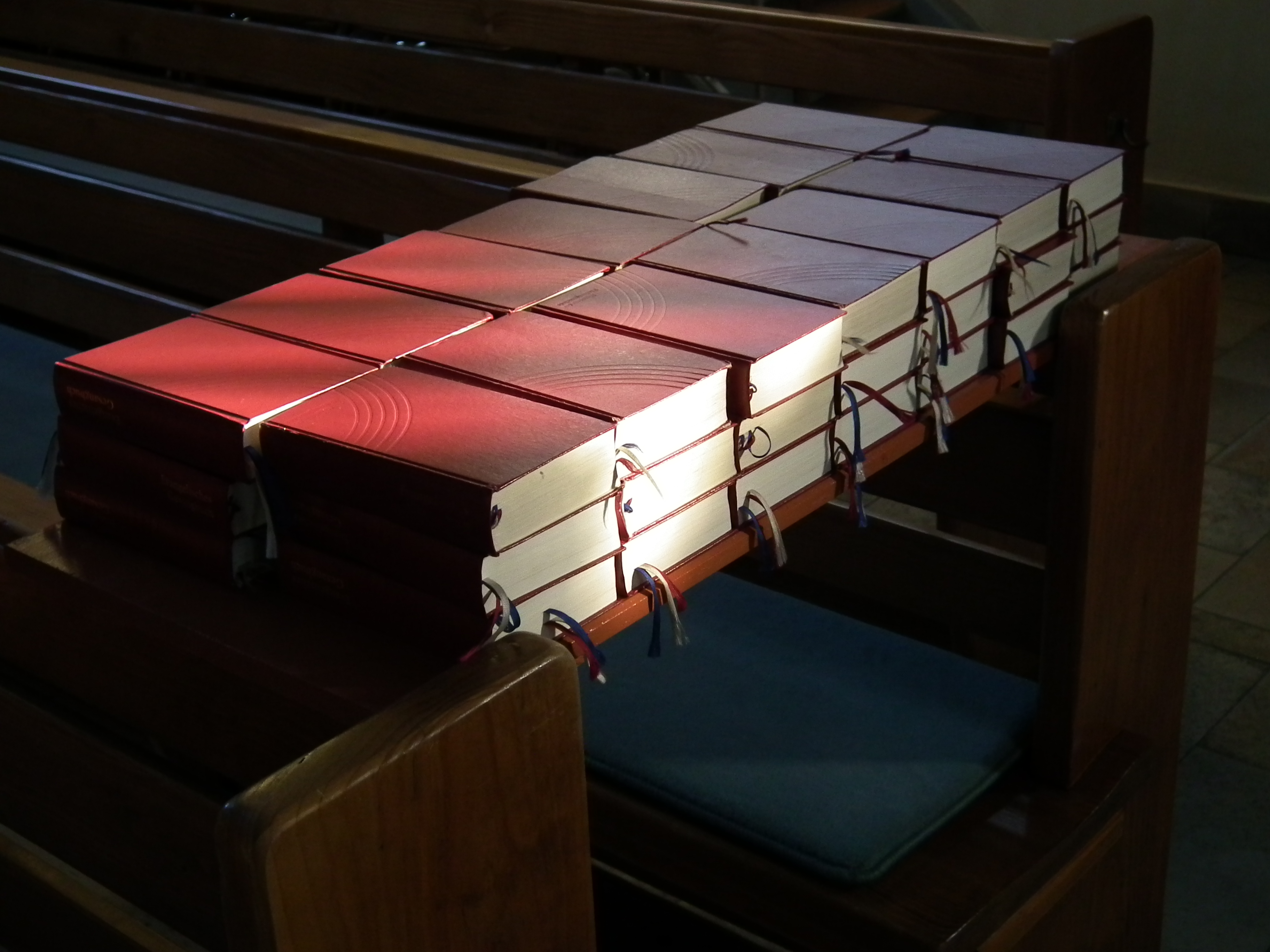
Protestant hymnals

Evangelisches Gesangbuch (EG; German: [evaŋˈɡeːlɪʃəs ɡəˈzaŋbuːx], lit. "Protestant song book") is the current hymnal of German-language congregations in Germany, neighbouring Alsace and Lorraine in France, as well as Austria, and Luxembourg. Introduced from 1993 and 1996, it succeeds the Evangelisches Kirchengesangbuch (EKG). Evangelisches Gesangbuch appears in 14 different regional editions, which add local hymns to the 535 pieces common to all editions.

More generally, Evangelisches Gesangbuch was the name of many Protestant hymnals in history.

== Literature ==
- Gerhard Hahn, Jürgen Henkys (ed.): Liederkunde zum evangelischen Gesangbuch. Vandenhoeck & Ruprecht, Göttingen 2000–2019
- Wolfgang Herbst (ed.): Komponisten und Liederdichter des evangelischen Gesangbuchs. Vandenhoeck & Ruprecht, Göttingen 1999, ISBN 3-525-50318-0
- Ernst Lippold, Günter Vogelsang: Konkordanz zum Evangelischen Gesangbuch mit Verzeichnis der Strophenanfänge, Kanons, mehrstimmigen Sätze und Wochenlieder. Vandenhoeck & Ruprecht, Göttingen 1995, ISBN 3-525-50316-4
- Matthias Neufeld: Das Bild der Kirche im Singen der Gemeinde. Überlegungen zur Bedeutung des gesungenen Wortes für das Selbstverständnis der Kirche anhand ausgewählter Lieder des „Evangelischen Gesangbuchs“. Rombach, Freiburg 2005, ISBN 3-7930-5015-7 (online)
- Karl Christian Thust: Bibliografie über die Lieder des Evangelischen Gesangbuchs. Vandenhoeck & Ruprecht, Göttingen 2006, ISBN 978-3-525-50336-2
