= Ein Haus voll Glorie schauet =

Catholic hymn for festive events, such as dedication of a church

- German Catholic hymn by Joseph Mohr
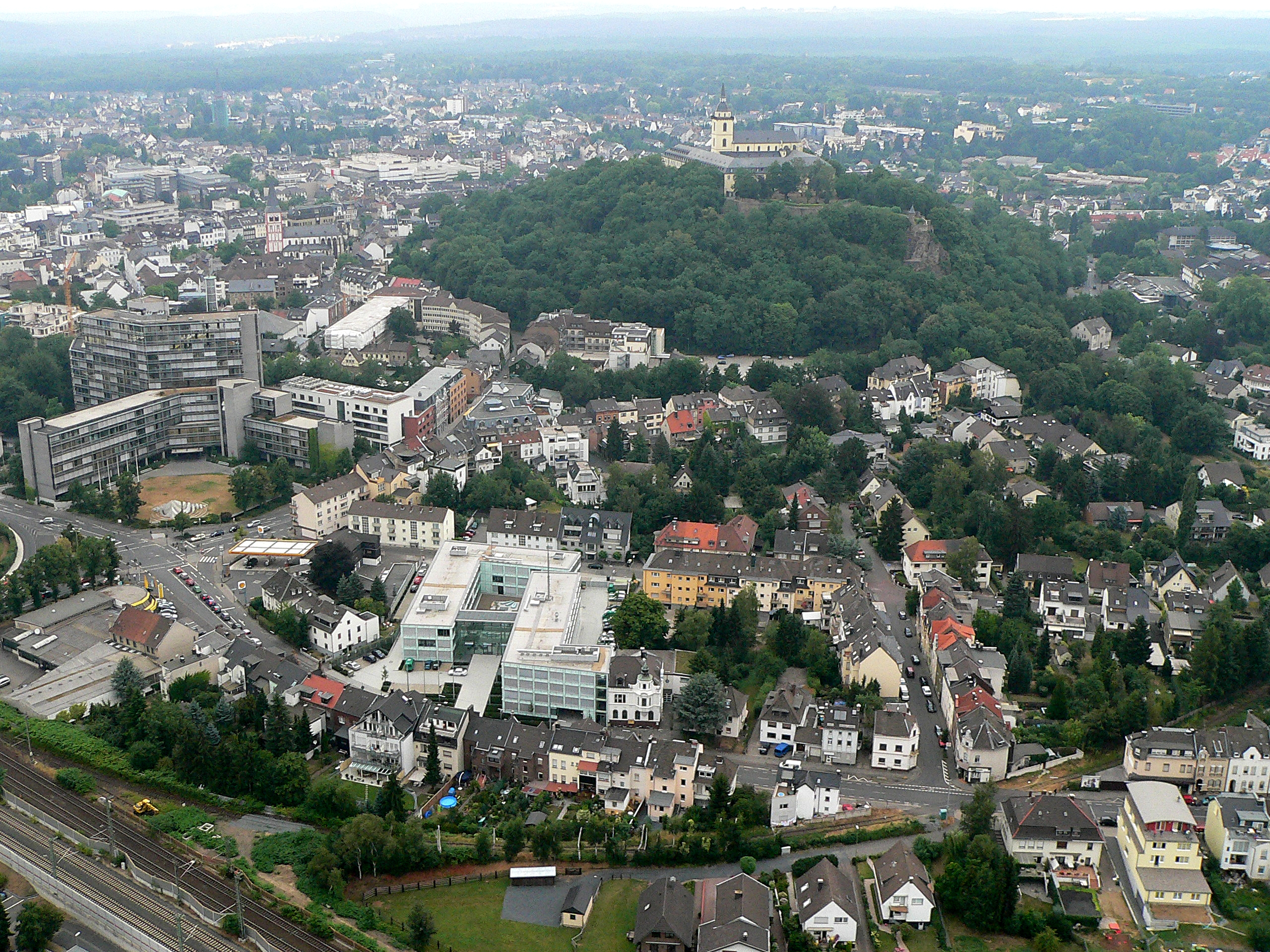
- Siegburg, with the Michaelsberg Abbey above the town
- English: A house full of glory looks
- Text: by Joseph Mohr
- Language: German
- Published: 1876
- GL 478

"Ein Haus voll Glorie schauet" (A house full of glory looks) is a popular German Catholic hymn, frequently sung during pilgrimages, during the consecration of churches (Kirchweihe), and on their subsequent anniversaries. Text and tune were written and composed, in a similar tempo to the Prussian Army military marches that were widely popular during the German Empire, as an anthem of nonviolent resistance to Otto von Bismarck's anti-Catholic Kulturkampf by Fr. Joseph Mohr in 1875. The lyrics were changed significantly for the post-Vatican II Catholic hymnal Gotteslob (GL 478), with stanzas two to five written by "Hans W. Marx" (a pseudonym) in 1972, which has since attracted criticism by some Traditionalist Catholics. It has inspired musical settings for festive occasions such as the millennium of the Bamberg Cathedral.

== History ==
Born Joseph Hermann Mohr in Siegburg in 1834 the son of a teacher, the hymn writer was a member of the Society of Jesus from 1853, and a priest from 1866. Before his consecration as a priest, he was president of the Marianische Kongregation and responsible for music (Musikpräfekt). He published a hymnal which was succeeded by his hymnal Cäcilia, which appeared in 1936 in the 36th edition. He devoted his life to choral music in the Church, publishing Manuale cantorum (Cantors' manual) and editing later editions of the hymnal Cantate!, which first contained "Ein Haus voll Glorie schauet".

The Society of Jesus was persecuted as part of Otto von Bismarck's Jesuits Law (1872), a part of his Kulturkampf against the Catholic Church in Germany. Therefore, Mohr had left Germany when he wrote text and melody of the hymn, possibly in 1875. He may have been inspired by the Michaelsberg Abbey on a mountain overlooking his hometown. Published in 1876, the song is regarded as an anthem of Catholic nonviolent resistance (kirchlicher Widerstand) to the Iron Chancellor and to the concept of Caesaropapism. Fr. Mohr accordingly chose to transfer the style of patriotic songs popular during the German Empire into a Catholic hymn. It became popular immediately, and is still his most popular creation.

The song is a confession of faith, and a processional song, proclaiming Catholic identity. The text provides powerful images of how the Catholic Church in Germany still had much to recover from after the Reformation, the Enlightenment, and the 1803 German mediatization. Heinrich Peters says that the original hymn corresponds to the Church's teachings from the First Vatican Council in 1870. Mohr's hymn became known locally as the Siegburg Hymne.

After the Second Vatican Council and the promulgation of the Mass of Paul VI, the traditionalist exclusivity of Fr. Mohr's salvation theology as expressed in his lyrics drew harsh criticism from ascendant Modernists, most notably by Ida Friederike Görres, for allegedly being "dated". A similar desire for a radically new direction for the Catholic Church in Germany inspired Hans W. Marx to write and submit four new stanzas for the 1975 Gotteslob Catholic hymnal, in which the last three new stanzas appeared; only Mohr's first stanza from 1876 was left intact. All Marx's stanzas, with Mohr's first, are still part of the second edition of Gotteslob of 2013, as GL 478. Marx's replacement stanzas, like those in the many other similarly rewritten hymns in both Gotteslob hymnals, have since received extremely harsh criticism over their alleged inferiority to Fr. Mohr's original lyrics, on the Traditionalist Catholic website OnePeterFive.

== First stanza ==
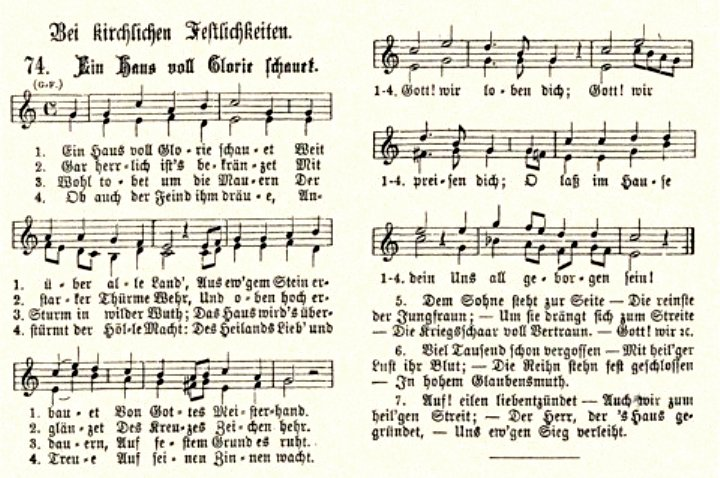
"Ein Haus voll Glorie" in Mohrs hymnal Cantate, 1883

Ein Haus voll Glorie schauet
Weit über alle Land',
Aus ew'gem Stein erbauet
Von Gottes Meisterhand.
Gott! wir loben dich;
Gott! wir preisen dich;
O laß im Hause dein
Uns all geborgen sein!

== Melody and settings ==
The hymnic melody, reminiscent of a Prussian military march, is suitable for festive occasions and processions. In the traditional and Pre-1975 lyrics, the last lines are the refrain: "Gott, wir loben dich, Gott, wir preisen dich. O lass im Hause dein uns all geborgen sein" (God, we laud You, God, we praise You. O let us all be sheltered within Your house). Their melody moves up and forward.

In 2012 Christopher Tambling composed a setting of the hymn to celebrate the 1000th anniversary of Bamberg Cathedral. Tambling's version was for choir, orchestra and organ, with different scoring in the five stanzas. Naji Hakim wrote in 2017 variations on the hymn for organ for the 50th anniversary of St. Nikolaus in Bergen-Enkheim.

== Literature ==
- Michael Hölscher, C. Mönkehues: "Heilig, Herr der Himmelsheere?!" Problematische Bilderwelten in Psalmen und Kirchenliedern. Material zur Bibelarbeit beim 97. Deutschen Katholikentag in Osnabrück. S. 10–12 (online).
- Rebecca Schmidt: Gegen den Reiz der Neuheit. Katholische Restauration im 19. Jahrhundert. Heinrich Bone, Joseph Mohr, Guido Maria Dreves (Mainzer hymnologische Studien Band 15). Francke, Tübingen 2002, ISBN 3-7720-8073-1 ( at Google Books – dazu Rezension von Michael Fischer in Lied und populäre Kultur – Song and Popular Culture. Jahrbuch des Deutschen Volksliedarchivs, 49. Jahrgang. Waxmann, Münster 2004, ISBN 3-8309-6591-5, pp 263 f., , p. 263, at Google Books).
- Meinrad Walter: "Ich lobe meinen Gott …" 40 Gotteslob-Lieder vorgestellt und erschlossen. Herder, Freiburg i. Br. 2015, ISBN 978-3-451-31260-1, pp. 79–82.
