= Maria, breit den Mantel aus =

Marian hymn in German

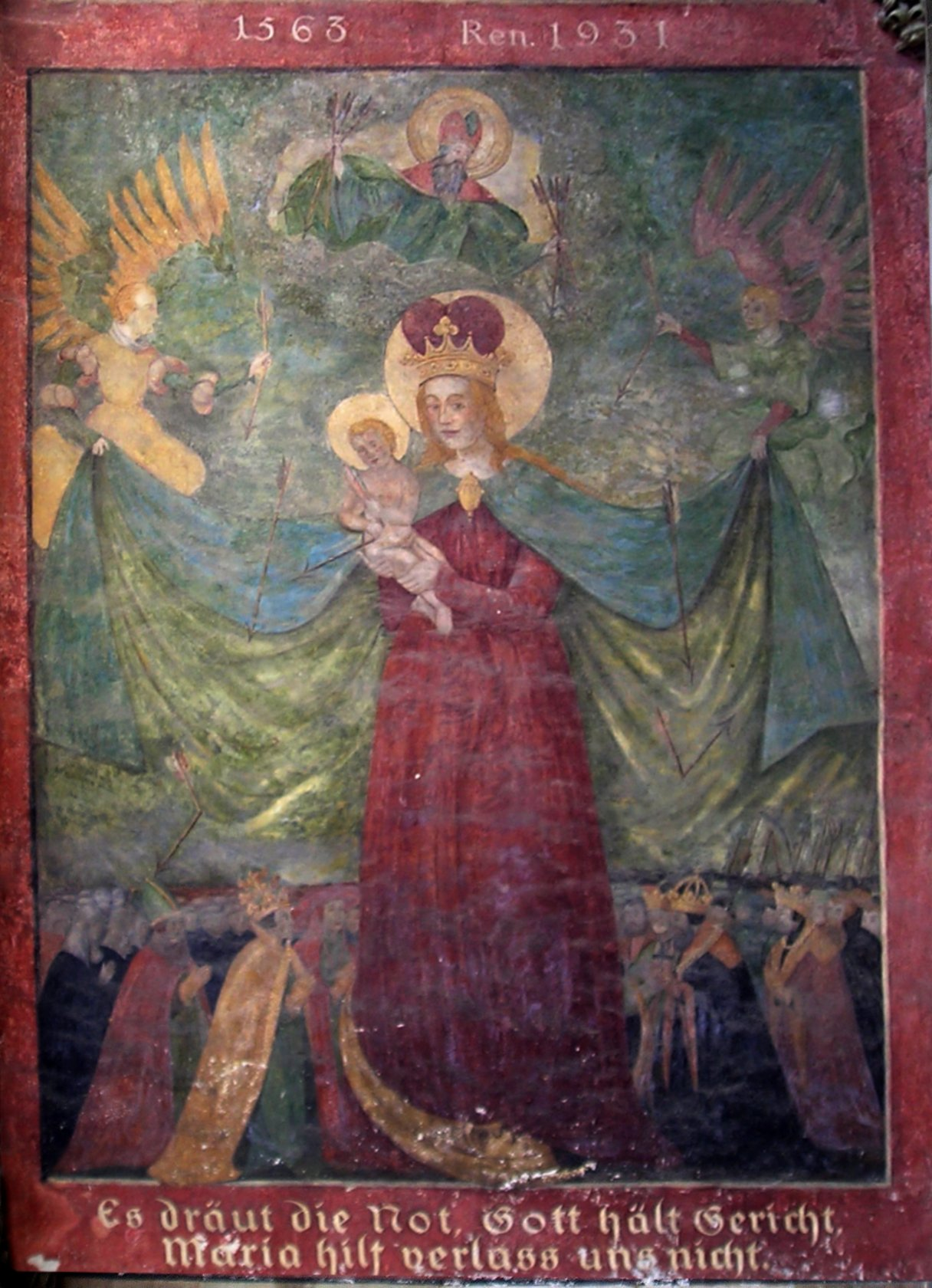
Virgin of Mercy at St. Nikolaus, Überlingen

"Maria, breit den Mantel aus" (Mary, spread out your cloak) is one of the most popular Marian hymns in German, first printed in 1640.

== History ==
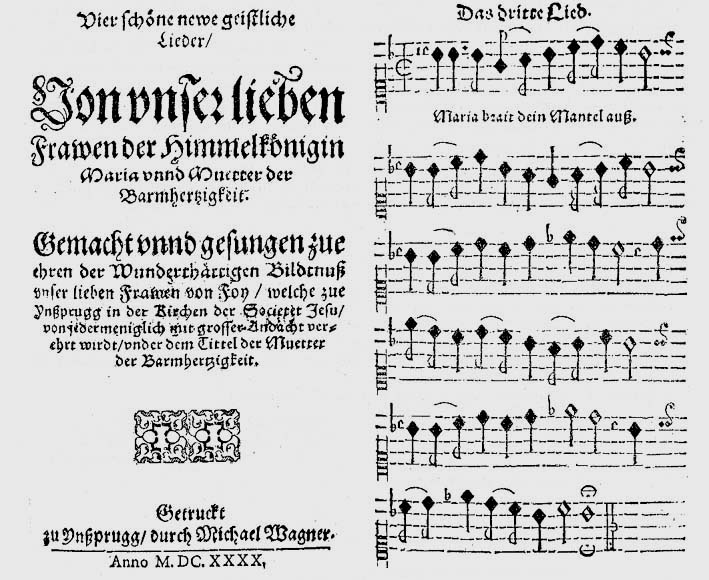
First print, from Innsbruck, 1640)

The oldest extant print of "Maria, breit den Mantel aus" is in a booklet of four Marian hymns published by the Innsbruck music publisher Michael Wagner, under the header "Vier schöne newe geistliche Lieder, Von vnser lieben Frawen der Himmelkönigin Maria vnnd Muetter der Barmhertzigkeit, Gemacht vnnd gesungen zue ehren der Wunderthättigen Bildtnuß vnser lieben Frawen von Foy, welche zue Ynßprugg in der Kirchen der Societet Jesu, von jedermeniglich mit grosser Andacht verehrt wirdt, vnder dem Tittel der Muetter der Barmhertzigkeit" (Four beautiful new spiritual songs, of our dear Lady Queen of Heaven Mary and Mother of mercy, made and sung to honour the miraculous image of our dear Lady of Foy, which is honoured by everybody at the church of the Society of Jesus in Innsbruck with great devotion, under the title Mother of mercy.). The song has 29 stanzas in this print, of uneven poetic quality. It is probably a compilation of older origins. The song remained in hymnals until the middle of the 18th century.

The song was revived from the middle of the 19th century, when Catholics needed songs during the Kulturkampf against the majority of Protestants in Prussia. Philipp Maximilian Körner (1811–1854), a collector of songs during the Romantic period, printed the four songs of 1640 in 1841 in his collection Marianischer Liederkranz.

The Jesuit Guido Maria Dreves published a revision of the text in 1885, and Fr. Joseph Hermann Mohr published a revised text with a new melody in 1891. The two versions entered regional publications; Dreves' version was published in the regional hymnal of the Diocese of Meissen, while Mohr's version was accepted into the hymnals of Basel, Freiburg and Münster.

Georg Thurmair and Adolf Lohmann united in 1934 Dreves' melody with the text by Mohr. This version, reduced to four stanzas, became accepted to the common hymnal in German, Gotteslob as GL 595, retained in the second edition as GL 534.

== Melody ==
The melody as in the first Innsbruck print from 1640, and the Gotteslob:
