= Morgenglanz der Ewigkeit =

- Christian hymn
- Written: 1684
- Text: by Christian Knorr von Rosenroth
- Language: German
- Melody: by Johann Rudolf Ahle
- Composed: 1662
- Published: 1704

"Morgenglanz der Ewigkeit" (Morning splendour of eternity) is a Christian hymn with German text originally by Christian Knorr von Rosenroth, written around 1690 and set to music for private devotion. It became known with a 1662 melody by Johann Rudolf Ahle. The song is part of modern German hymnals and songbooks. It was translated to English as "Come, Thou Bright and Morning Star", and as "Dayspring of Eternity".

== History ==
Christian Knorr von Rosenroth, a Lutheran theologian from Silesia, wrote the text of "Morgenglanz der Ewigkeit" in 1684, intended for use in private devotion (Hausandacht). The song was soon included in Protestant church services. From the 1930s, it also became part of Catholic hymnals. In both denominations, it is used as a morning song and also as a song praising Jesus.

The song appears in the Protestant hymnal Evangelisches Gesangbuch as EG . It is part of the Catholic Gotteslob of 2013 as a morning song, GL 84, taking the original followed by three stanzas written in 1690 by Maria Luise Thurmair. It is part of many hymnals and songbooks.

== Text ==
The poet wrote seven stanzas of six lines each, rhyming AABBCC, with the last line extremely short. His first stanza has remained almost unchanged, while the other stanzas vary according to occasion and denomination, The following is the original beginning:

Morgen-Glantz der Ewigkeit
Licht vom unerschöpften Lichte
Schick uns diese Morgen-Zeit
Deine Strahlen zu Gesichte:
Und vertreib durch deine Macht
unsre Nacht.

Die bewölckte Finsternis
Müsse deinem Glantz entfliegen
Die durch Adams Apfel-Biß
Uns die kleine Welt bestiegen:
Daß wir, Herr, durch deinen Schein
Selig seyn.

In juxtaposition: the first two stanzas as Maria Luise Thurmair modified them in 1969 for the Catholic Gotteslob:

Morgenglanz der Ewigkeit,
Licht vom unerschaffnen Lichte,
schick uns diese Morgenzeit
deine Strahlen zu Gesichte,
und vertreib’ durch deine Macht
unsre Nacht.

Such uns heim mit deiner Kraft,
o du Aufgang aus der Höhe,
dass der Sünde bittre Haft
und des Zweifels Not vergehe.
Gib uns Trost und Zuversicht
durch dein Licht.

The morning splendour is a symbol of Jesus who is expected to expel the night. The wording "Licht vom unerschöpften Lichte" (light from uncreated light) is reminiscent of a passage in the Nicean Creed. Later stanzas are a prayer for a life pleasing God. The final two stanzas compare Jesus to a "Gnaden-Sonne" (sun of mercy) which will shine for the believers also in the Beyond.

== Melodies and settings ==
Rosenroth composed a melody when he first published. However, a Halle-Liederbuch of 1704 combined it with a melody that Johann Rudolf Ahle had composed in 1662. The melody was used by Friedrich Dörr for the Advent song "Kündet allen in der Not".

Max Reger composed a chorale prelude based on the hymn tune in 1901, as part of his Op. 79b, the fourth of 13 preludes. Johannes Weyrauch wrote a chorale prelude as part of his Op. 52.

== Translation ==
The hymn was translated to English. Richard Massie translated it to "Come, Thou Bright and Morning Star", published in 1857 in the Church Psalter & Hymn Book. A version "Dayspring of Eternity" was written by Robert Brown-Borthwick, published in Church Hymns in 1871 as a morning hymn.
