= Maria, dich lieben ist allzeit mein Sinn =

German Marian hymn

- Marian hymn by Anonymous
- English: Mary, to love you is always on my mind
- Written: 18th century, last revised 1972
- Text: Unknown author, revised by Heinrich Bone, Joseph Mohr and Friedrich Dörr
- Language: German

"Maria, dich lieben ist allzeit mein Sinn" (Mary, to love you is always on my mind) is a Marian hymn in German. It was created in the beginning of the 18th century as "Maria zu lieben, ist allzeit mein Sinn" (Loving Mary is always on my mind), and became the most popular Marian hymn in German. The common Catholic hymnal in German, Gotteslob, has a version modernised by Friedrich Dörr that already appeared in its first edition from 1975. It shares with the older version only the first line.

== History ==
The author and composer of the hymn "Maria zu lieben, ist allzeit mein Sinn" are unknown. It was created in the beginning of the 18th century, and became the most popular Marian hymn in German. The text expresses in erotic language the spiritual love of the lyrical subject, to Mary, mother of Jesus. The song was possibly derived from a secular love song. It was used to conclude a pilgrimage to a place dedicated to Mary, describing the close relationship that had developed between the pilgrim and Mary.

The song was extant in several versions reproduced in leaflets, until Heinrich Bone created a version in his 1847 hymnal Cantate!, which reduced the text to five stanzas. His version is focused on intimate love with an outlook into eternal life.

Joseph Mohr created a version in nine stanzas, based on Bone and earlier sources, namely leaflets from Meschede (1752) and Paderborn (1765); his version incorporates doctrines. It was one of 23 Einheitslieder (common songs) that a 1916 bishops' conference in Fulda created. When a second approach to unify German Catholic hymns was undertaken by a bishops' conference in 1947, resulting in 72 songs, three of the additional stanzas were cut, resulting in the song's period of highest publication.

The first edition of the Gotteslob contained a version that retained only the (modified) first line from the original song, written by Friedrich Dörr, as GL 594. It was transferred without change to the 2013 edition as GL 521.
