= Erfreue dich, Himmel, erfreue dich, Erde =

1963 song

- Christian hymn
- Written: 1963
- Text: by Maria Luise Thurmair
- Language: German
- Based on: Psalm 148
- Composed: 1669
- Published: 1975

"Erfreue dich, Himmel, erfreue dich, Erde" ([ʔɛɐ̯ˈfʁɔʏ̯ə dɪç ˈhɪml̩ … ˈʔeːɐ̯də]; "Be glad, Heaven, be glad, Earth") is a Christian hymn in German. The current hymn, part of modern hymnals and song books, was written by Maria Luise Thurmair in 1963 as a Psalmlied (psalm song) based on Psalm 148 which deals with praise of God from his creatures. She wrote it using and expanding a short Christmas carol from the 17th century. She retained the first stanza completely and used its second half as a refrain. She also retained the old melody.

== History ==
=== Christmas carol ===
The hymn in two stanzas appeared in a 1697 Strasbourg hymnal as a Christmas carol, combining a text that first appeared in Augsburg in 1669 and a 1691 melody from Bamberg. The song does not go into details of the nativity, but calls Heaven and Earth, the elements, people and angels to praise the good Father and the child in the manger.

1. Erfreue dich, Himmel, erfreue dich, Erde;
erfreue sich alles, was fröhlich kann werden.
Auf Erden hier unten, im Himmel dort oben:
den gütigen Vater, den wollen wir loben.

2. Erd, Wasser, Luft, Feuer und himmlische Flammen,
ihr Menschen und Engel, stimmt alle zusammen:
Auf Erden hier unten, im Himmel dort oben:
das Kind in der Krippe, das wollen wir loben.

=== Psalm song ===
In 1963, in preparation of a common Catholic hymnal in German, Gotteslob, which appeared in 1975, Maria Luise Thurmair expanded the hymn to a Psalmlied (psalm song) based on Psalm 148. She retained the first stanza, used its ending for a refrain, and changed the second stanza by removing the connection to Christmas at its end, and using the stanza as the conclusion of her hymn. She also retained the melody.

Thurmair inserted new stanzas dealing with praise of God from his creatures, using many details from the Genesis creation narrative that are already mentioned in the psalm, such as sun, moon and the stars, the depth of the sea and its animals, storms, deserts, mountains and more.

The song was first published by Herder-Verlag in 1963. It was included in the Gotteslob of 1975 as GL 259. In the 2013 edition it appears as GL 467, in the section "Leben in der Welt - Schöpfung" (life in the world – creation). The song is included in several song books.

== Usage ==
The beginning of the song was chosen as the title of a book by Meinrad Walter, Erfreue dich, Himmel, erfreue dich, Erde introducing 40 hymns from the 2013 Gotteslob with historic background.
