= Herr, dir ist nichts verborgen =

Catholic hymn by Maria Luise Thurmair

- Christian hymn
- English: Lord, nothing is hidden from you
- Text: by Maria Luise Thurmair
- Language: German
- Based on: Psalm 139
- Melody: by Kaspar Ulenberg
- Published: 1975

"Herr, dir ist nichts verborgen" (Lord, nothing is hidden from you) is a Catholic hymn by Maria Luise Thurmair, based on Psalm 139 and set to a 1582 melody by Kaspar Ulenberg. The hymn in five stanzas of seven lines each was written in 1973. It appeared in the Catholic hymnal Gotteslob in 1975 as GL 292. In the current Gotteslob, it is GL 428, in the section "Vertrauen und Trost" (Trust and consolation).

It is one of the Psalmenlieder (psalm songs), which can be used in the Catholic liturgic instead of the psalm chant between the readings from the Old Testament and the New Testament.

== Bibliography ==
- "Psalmlieder im Gotteslob" (PDF) (in German). Diocese of Munich.
- "Herr, dir ist nichts verborgen (L) / Leben in Gott - Vertrauen und Trost" (in German). mein-gotteslob.de.
