= Maria Luise Thurmair =

German writer (1912–2005)

- Maria Luise Thurmair, in the 1970s
- Born: Maria Luise Mumelter; 27 September 1912; Bozen, South Tyrol, Austro-Hungarian Empire
- Died: 24 October 2005 (aged 93); Germering, Germany
- Education: University of Innsbruck
- Occupations: Hymnodist; Writer
- Organizations: Liturgical Movement; Commission for Gotteslob
- Spouse: Georg Thurmair
- Awards: Pro Ecclesia et Pontifice

Maria Luise Thurmair née Mumelter (27 September 1912 – 24 October 2005) was a German Catholic theologian, hymnodist and writer. She contributed the lyrics of many hymns when the Catholic hymnal Gotteslob was first published in 1975.

== Career ==
Maria Luise Mumelter was born in Bozen, South Tyrol, then in the Austro-Hungarian Empire, the daughter of the towns's last Austrian Bezirkshauptmann. Due to political pressure, the family moved to Innsbruck, where she earned her Matura. She studied philosophy at the University of Innsbruck and attended classes in Liturgics with Josef Andreas Jungmann SJ. She wrote her doctoral thesis on Irene Angelina of Byzanz in 1936. She married Georg Thurmair, a poet in Munich, in 1941.

Thurmair and her husband were active in the Catholic Youth Movement and especially in the Liturgical Movement. She began during World War II to work for the Innsbruck hymnal Gotteslob, followed by contributions to several hymnals of German dioceses, the songbooks Singende Gemeinde (Singing congregation) and Kirchenlied (Church song), a precursor of the later Gotteslob. She translated Latin hymns and several books. She published during the war Liebesgespräche im Krieg (Love talks during the war), a lyrical dialogue of letters including poems which she exchanged with her husband who was a soldier. It was reprinted in 1981 by Aventinus. She lectured on subjects such as faith, liturgical year, first communion and religious education. The couple had six children and lived in Munich.

From 1963, Thurmair worked on the first Catholic hymnal for German-speaking countries, Gotteslob (GL), as the only woman in the commission. The first edition of 1975 included 38 of her songs, which was the highest number for one hymnwriter. Some of her hymns (or single stanzas) have also been included in the Protestant hymnal Evangelisches Gesangbuch (EG). The current Gotteslob includes 28 of her songs.

She received the Papal order Pro Ecclesia et Pontifice. She died in Germering, near Munich.

== Works ==
=== Selected prose works ===
- Thurmair, Maria Luise; Thurmair, Georg (1981). Liebesgespräche im Krieg (in German). Eggenfelden. ISBN 978-3-88481-004-0. OCLC 632448046.
- Fünf Paar Kinderschuhe

=== Hymns in Gotteslob ===
Several of her hymns appear in the current Catholic German hymnal Gotteslob, and even more in its first 1975 edition. She wrote several lyrics for the parts of the mass Kyrie, Gloria, Credo, and many psalm songs, often on traditional melodies. Several songs are related to the occasions of the liturgical year, such as Advent, Christmas and Pentecost. Other songs relate to events such as the Stations of the Cross. She wrote many Psalmlieder, rephrasing psalms. The table lists the incipit, the place of the hymn in the liturgy, a model for the text, year and author of the melody in the current Gotteslob when the song appears in it, otherwise of the first edition, the year when the text was completed, the numbers in the first and current Gotteslob, and notes.

Incipit	Liturgy	Text source	Tune	Year	GL 1975	GL	Note
Tau aus Himmelshöhn	Kyrie		1952 Rohr	1952	103	158	Advent
Licht, das uns erschien	Kyrie		2009 Alan Wilson	1952	129	159	Christmas
Gott des Vaters ewger Sohn	Kyrie		1952 Rohr	1952	524	160	
Der in seinem Wort uns hält	Kyrie		1950 Rohr	1958	485	164	
Send uns deines Geistes Kraft	Kyrie		1950 Rohr	1952	246	165	Pentecost
Christus, Gotteslamm	Kyrie		1952 Rohr	1952	175		
Herr Jesus, König ewiglich	Kyrie		1601 Johann Koler	1962	518		
Preis und Ehre Gott dem Herren	Gloria		1962 Rohr	1971	486	171	
Herr, Gott im Himmel, dir sei Ehre	Gloria		1971 Otmar Faulstich	1970	458		
Herr, deine Güt ist unbegrenzt	Psalm	Psalm 36	1525 Greitter	1971	289	427	
Erbarme dich, erbarm dich mein	Psalm	Psalm 51	1562 Ulenberg	1975	164	268	Penitence
König ist der Herr	Psalm	Psalm 99	1562	1971	275		
Herr, dir ist nichts verborgen	Psalm	Psalm 139	1562 Ulenberg	1973	292	428	
Dich will ich rühmen, Herr und Gott	Psalm	Psalm 145	1971 Paul Ernst Ruppel	1971	274		
Ihr Sonnen und Monde stanzas 2–5 for Erfreue dich, Himmel	Psalm	Psalm 148	1669	1963	259	467	
Gott ist dreifaltig einer	Credo		1642	1943	489	354	
Dir Vater Lobpreis werde	Offertory		1562 Ulenberg	1975	523	183	
Hoch sei gepriesen unser Gott	Benedictus		1530	1985		384	
Den Herren will ich loben	Magnificat	Magnificat	1614 Teschner	1972	261	395	
Tag an Glanz und Freuden groß	Christmas	Dies est laetitiae	1320	1969	137		Paraphrase
Das Geheimnis lasst uns künden	Corpus Christi	Pange Lingua	1300	1969	544		Paraphrase
Lobe, Zion, deinen Hirten	Corpus Christi	Lauda Sion	1300	1972	545	850	Würzburg region, paraphrase
Komm herab, o Heilger Geist	Pentecost	Veni Sancte Spiritus	1200	1971	244	344	paraphrase, with Markus Jenny
Der Geist des Herrn erfüllt das All	Pentecost		1609 Vulpius	1946	249	347	
Du heller Schein, du lebendig Licht stanzas 2–5 for Nun bitten wir den Heiligen Geist	Pentecost		1500	1994	248	348	
Komm, o Tröster, Heilger Geist	Pentecost	Veni Sancte Spiritus	1639	1972	250	349	
Salve – Maria, Königin		Salve Regina	1666	1979	572		
Maria, Mutter unsres Herrn		Alma Redemptoris Mater	1599	1969	577	530	after an old hymn
Dank sei dir, Vater, für das ewge Leben			1640 Crüger	1994	634	484	
Such uns heim mit deiner Kraft stanzas 2–4 for Morgenglanz der Ewigkeit			1662 Ahle	1975	668	84	Morning
Herr, wir hören auf dein Wort			1960 Heino Schubert	1959	998/2	449	
Laßt uns den Engel preisen			1614 Teschner	1975	687	540	Angels
Sieh, dein Licht will kommen			1971 Markus Jenny	1971	147		
Du schweigst, Herr	Passion		1965 Bertold Hummel	1972	185	773	Würzburg region, Stations of the Cross
Alles Leben ist dunkel			1973 Wolfgang Menschick	1971	552		
Komm, Herr Jesu, komm			1951 Rohr	1973	568		
Gelobt sei Gott in aller Welt	Apostles		1970 Erhard Quack	1970	610	882	Würzburg region
In Jubel, Herr, wir dich erheben	Martyrs		1970 Erhard Quack	1940	611		
Herr, sei gelobt durch deinen Knecht			1940 Erhard Quack	1970	612	880	Würzburg region
Gott sei durch euch gepriesen	Virgins		1971 Erhard Quack	1972	613		
Sieh, dein Licht will kommen	Christmas		1971 Markus Jenny	1971	147		
Seht unsers Herrn Erbarmen im Tempel dagestellt					837	785	Passau region

== Literature ==
- Martin Lätzel, "Thurmair-Mumelter, Maria-Luise." In Biographisch-Bibliographisches Kirchenlexikon (BBKL), vol 27, Bautz, Nordhausen 2007, ISBN 978-3-88309-393-2.
