= Josef Venantius von Wöss =

Austrian composer, church musician, bandmaster, music teacher

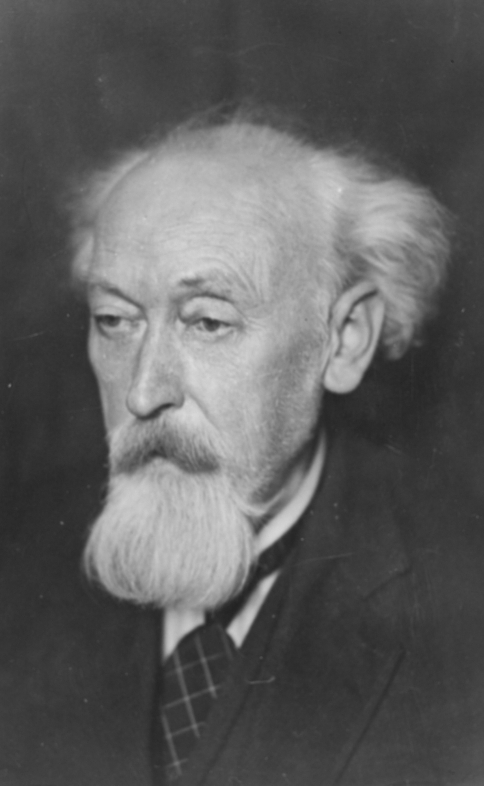
- Wöss in the 1930s
- Born: 13 June 1863; Cattaro, Kingdom of Dalmatia
- Died: 10 October 1943 (aged 80); Vienna
- Other name: Josef Venantius von Wöß
- Occupations: Composer; Academic teacher

Josef Venantius von Wöss (13 June 1863 – 22 October 1943) was a Viennese church musician, composer, teacher of harmony and music publishing lector. He is known for piano transcriptions of large-scale works by Gustav Mahler for Universal Edition.

== Life and career ==
Wöss was born in Cattaro, Kingdom of Dalmatia (now Montenegro), the son of an Austrian army captain (Hauptmann). The family moved to Vienna in 1866, where he received his first piano instruction from his mother and his uncle, Richard Löffler. He studied music from 1880 at the Konservatorium der Gesellschaft der Musikfreunde with Franz Krenn. From 1882, he worked as choral conductor of several men's choruses. He was a music teacher at the Militär-Oberrealschule in Mährisch Weißkirchen from 1886 to 1889. He then worked in Vienna as Korrektor for the Notenstecherei Waldheim-Eberle, a music publisher, until 1907. He also taught harmony at the Kirchenmusik-Vereinsschule of the Votivkirche in 1892 and 1893.

Wöss worked for Universal Edition in Vienna from 1908 to 1931, where he focused on piano reductions and arrangements. These included Mahler's symphonies with vocal parts (3, 4 and 8), Das klagende Lied and Das Lied von der Erde. For the latter, he also wrote a thematic analysis, including complete referencing of the texts. He also worked on publications of works by Anton Bruckner and Richard Wagner. He was church musician at the Kalvarienbergkirche and the Redemptoristenkirche in Hernals, and as music teacher. In the 1899/1900 season, he conducted a concert of the Wiener Singakademie. He was also reporter for the trade journal Musica divina, and a member of the society Denkmäler der Tonkunst in Österreich. He was awarded the title professor in 1926.

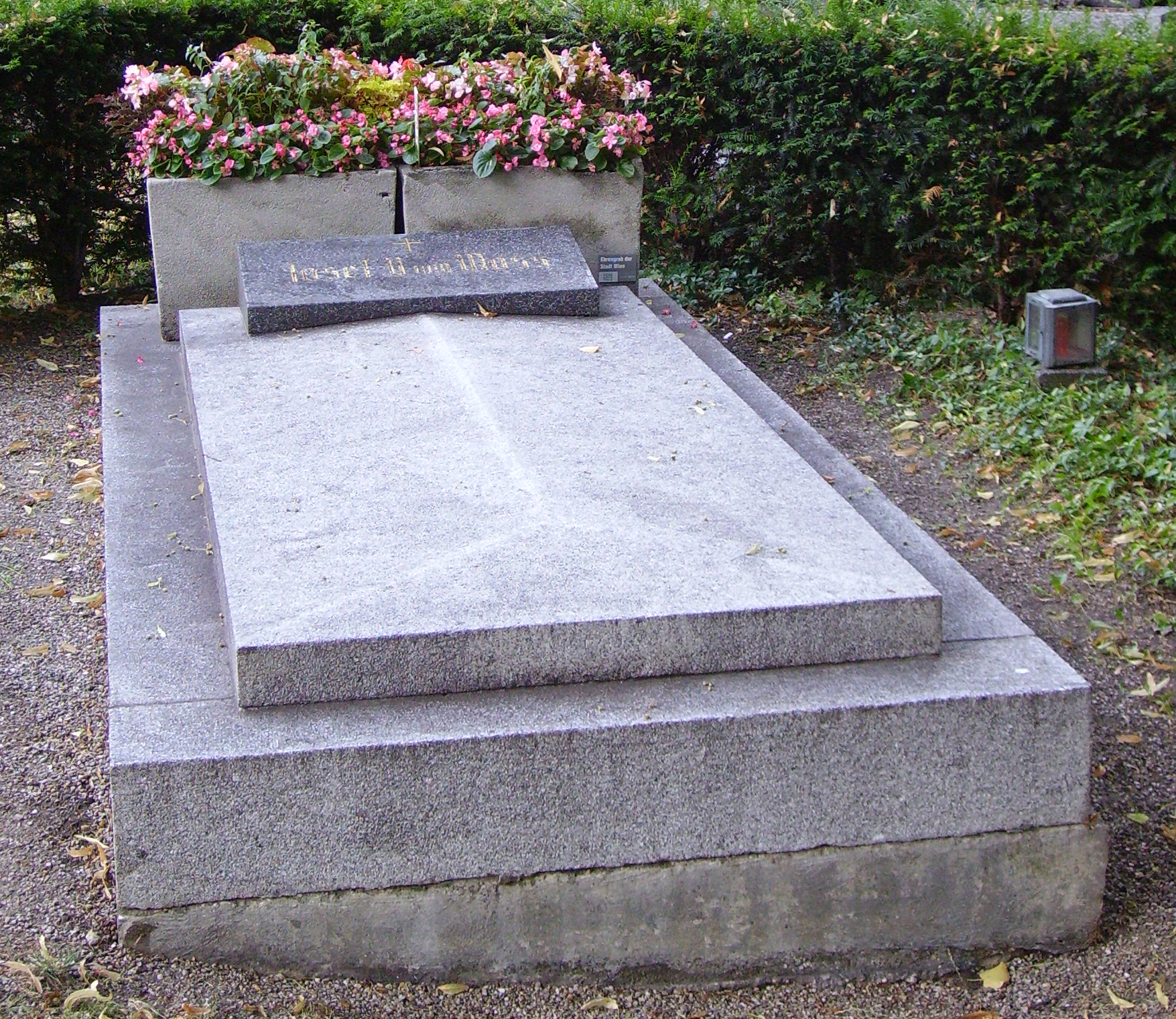
Grave in the Hernalser Friedhof

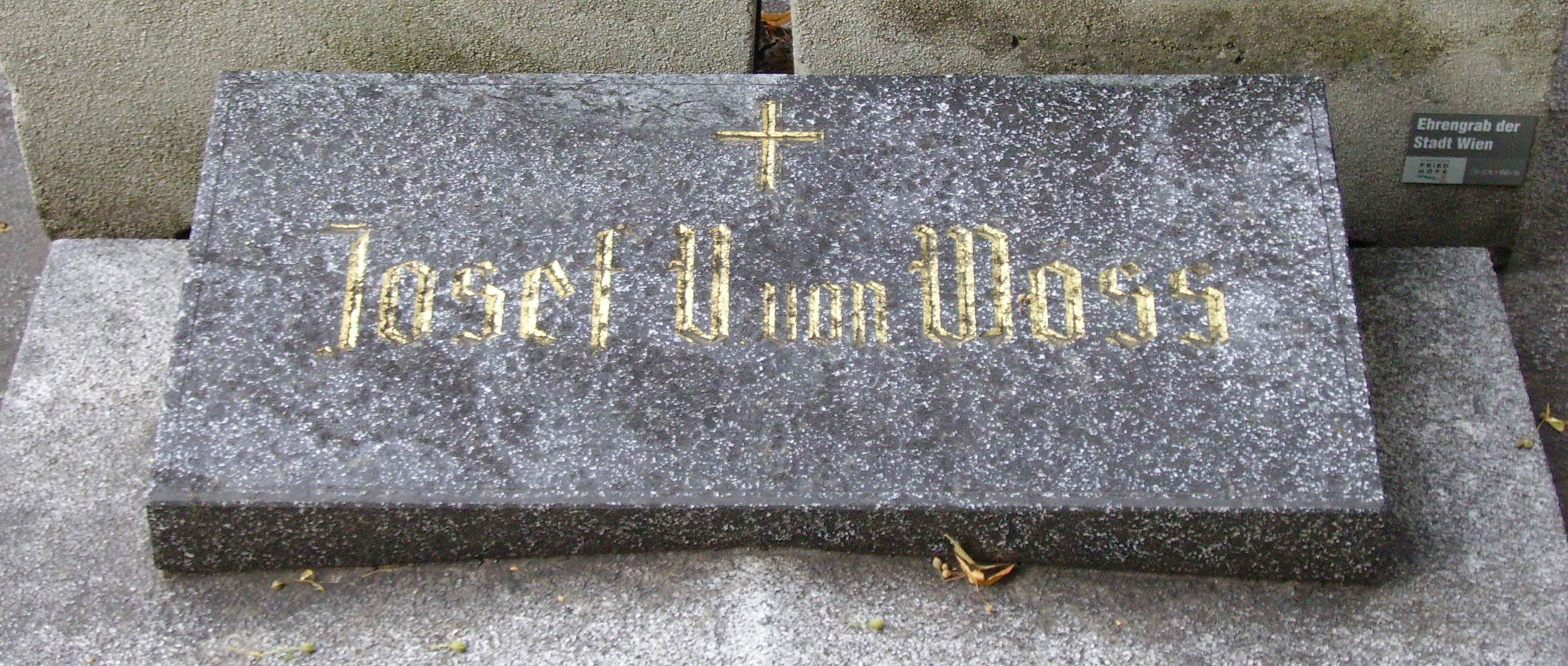
Detail of the gravestone

Wöss died in Vienna at age 80, and was buried in the Hernalser Friedhof where he was granted a grave of honour.

== Work ==
Wöss composed mainly sacred music and chamber music. His sacred music followed the ideas of the Cecilian Movement.

Choral sacred compositions by Wöss include:

=== Masses ===
- Missa in coena Domini, Op. 3g, in F major for mixed choir a cappella
- Missa in Honorem Beatae Mariae Virginis, Op. 32a No. 2, in C minor
- Messe zu Ehren der Hl. Cäcilia, Op. 32a No. 3, for mixed choirand organ, in E minor
- Missa in adorationem Ss. Trinitatis, Op. 45, for soloists, mixed choir, wind instruments and timpani (or organ)
- Missa in honorem Ss. Innocentium, Op. 62, in E major, for mixed choir and organ

=== Other major works ===
- Te Deum in C major, Op. 3a
- Requiem breve in G major, Op. 3f, for mixed choir and organ
- Te Deum in E minor, Op. 57, for mixed choir, organ and orchestra (or only organ)

=== Hymn melodies ===
Two of his hymn melodies, both to texts by Guido Maria Dreves, are contained in the German Catholic hymnal Gotteslob: "Gelobt seist du, Herr Jesu Christ" (GL 375) and "Ein Danklied sei dem Herrn" (GL 382).

=== Mahler transcriptions ===
Wöss published many piano arrangements for Universal Editions, including:

- Das klagende Lied: vocal score with piano reduction
- Symphony No. 3: arrangement for piano duet
- Symphony No. 4: arrangement for piano duet
- Symphony No. 8: piano arrangement/s
- Das Lied von der Erde: vocal score with piano reduction (1912)
- Symphony No. 9: arrangement for piano duet (1912)
