= Tobias Clausnitzer =

German Lutheran pastor and hymn writer

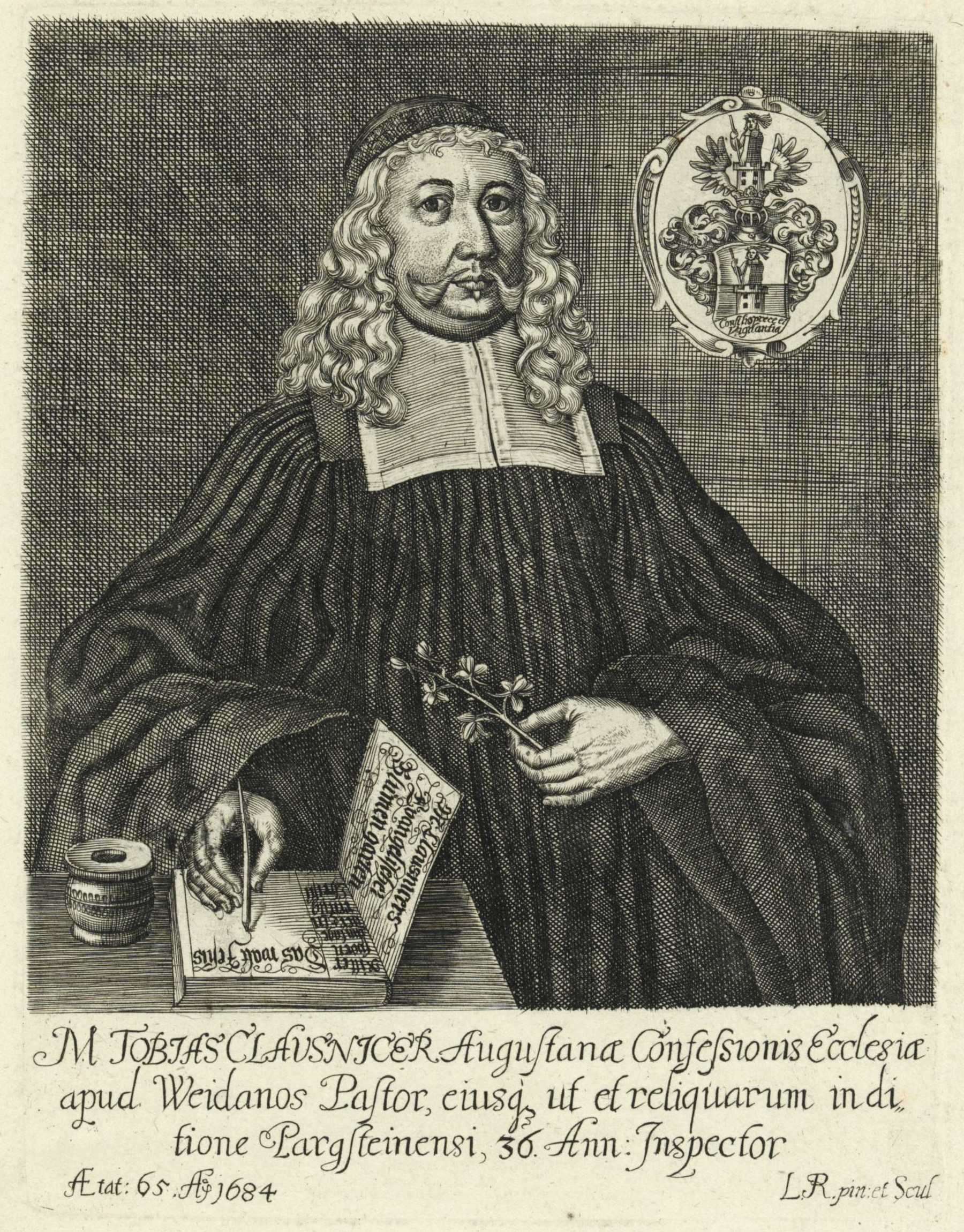
Tobias Clausnitzer in 1684

Tobias Clausnitzer (5 February 1619 − 7 May 1684) was a German Lutheran pastor and hymn writer.

== Leben und Wirken ==
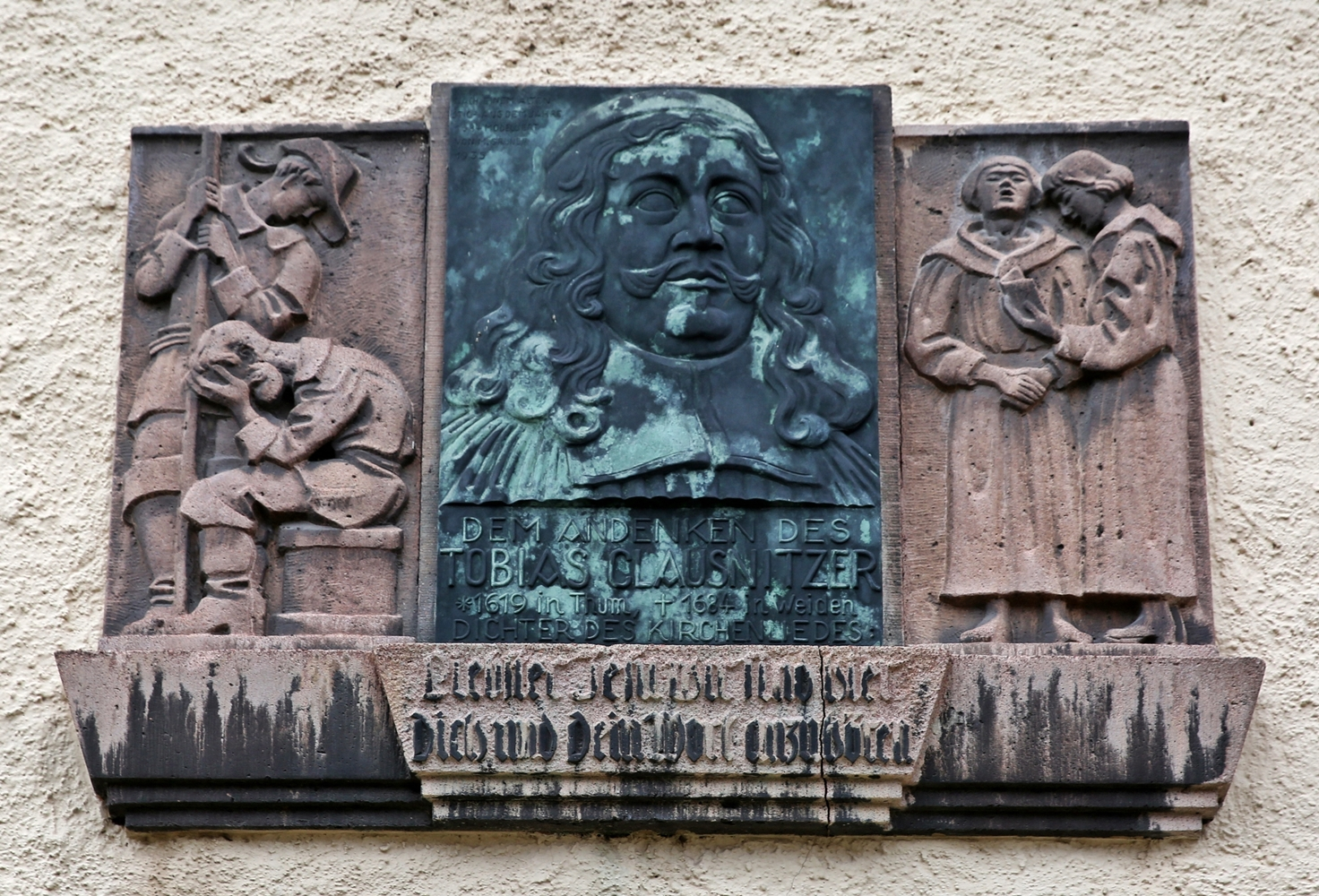
Memorial playque at the St.-Annen-Kirche in Thum

Born in Thum, Clausnitzer studied theology at the University of Leipzig from 1642. In 1644, he became military chaplain (Feldprediger) for a unit of the Swedish army. When the Thirty Years' War ended, he held a service celebrating the Peace of Westphalia in Weiden in der Oberpfalz in 1649. He settled, became pastor, and later also Kirchenrat and inspector of Parkstein and Weiden. He died in 1684 as Superintendent in Weiden.

He wrote theological treaties, sermons and hymns. "Liebster Jesu, wir sind hier" became popular, also in translations.

== Work ==
- "Herr Jesu, deine Angst und Pein", hymn in Evangelisches Gesangbuch EG 89 (1662)
- "Liebster Jesu, wir sind hier", hymn EG 161, melody by Johann Rudolph Ahle, 1664, published by Wolfgang Carl Briegel in 1687
- "Jesu, dein betrübtes Leiden", hymn in Evangelischen Kirchengesangbuch EKG) 69 (in a revised version)
- Oder Trauriges Schau-Bild, Der gantz mitleidigen Natur, über dem hoch-schmertzlichen Leiden und Sterben, Unsers gecreutzigten Herrn Jesu. Sermon reflecting the Passion of Jesus, Endter, Nürnberg 1662

== Literature ==
- Paul Pressel (1876). "Clausnitzer, Tobias". Allgemeine Deutsche Biographie (in German). Vol. 4. Leipzig: Duncker & Humblot. p. 297.
- Johannes Schluttig: Tobias Clausnitzer, der Dichter des Kirchenliedes "Liebster Jesu, wir sind hier". In: Herbergen der Christenheit. Jahrbuch für deutsche Kirchengeschichte 27, 1959, 62 ff.
- Helene Hoffmann: Tobias Clausnitzer. In: Die Oberpfalz 48, 1960, 111 ff.
- Helene Hoffmann: Tobias Clausnitzer und die Einführung des Simultaneums im Gemeinschaftsamt Weiden-Parkstein. In: Zeitschrift für bayerische Kirchengeschichte 29 (1960), S. 186–218.
- Friedrich Wilhelm Bautz (1975). "Clausnitzer, Tobias". In Bautz, Friedrich Wilhelm (ed.). Biographisch-Bibliographisches Kirchenlexikon (BBKL) (in German). Vol. 1. Hamm: Bautz. col. 1045. ISBN 3-88309-013-1.
- Manfred Knedlik: Tobias Clausnitzer (1619-1684). In: Die Oberpfalz – Brücke zum Osten, 1992, 107–111.
