= Naji Hakim =

Lebanese-French organist, composer and improviser (b. 1955)

- ناجي حكيم
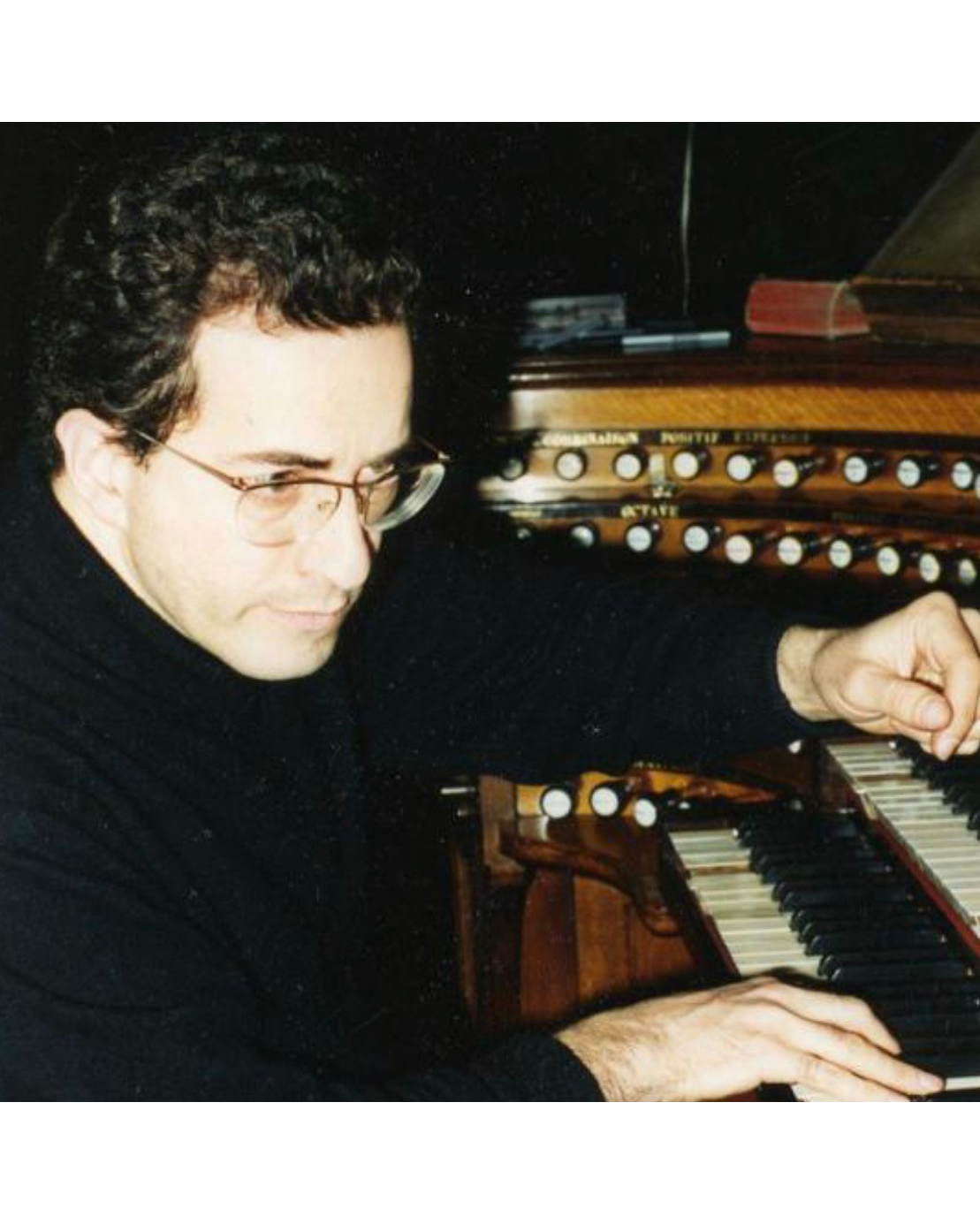
- Naji Hakim at the grand organ of the Basilica of the Sacred Heart of Montmartre, Paris
- Born: Naji Subhy Paul Irénée Hakim; 31 October 1955; Beirut
- Citizenship: French, naturalised 1980
- Education: Collège du Sacré Coeur de Beyrouth, Ecole Supérieur d'Ingénieurs de Beyrouth, Télécom ParisTech, Conservatoire National Supérieur de Musique
- Occupations: Organist; Composer; Improviser
- Years active: 1980–present
- Organizations: Sacré-Cœur, Paris (formerly) Église de la Sainte-Trinité, Paris (formerly)
- Notable work: Hommage à Igor Stravinsky, Memor, Gershwinesca, Le tombeau d'Olivier Messiaen, Pange Lingua, Ouverture Libanaise, Sindbad for orchestra
- Spouse: Marie-Bernadette Dufourcet Bocinos (m. 1980)
- Children: 2
- Website: najihakim.com

Naji Subhy Paul Irénée Hakim (Arabic: ناجي صبحي حكيم [Naji Sobhi Hakim]; born 31 October 1955) is a Franco-Lebanese organist, composer, and improviser.

He studied the organ under Jean Langlais at the Conservatoire de Paris, and succeeded Olivier Messiaen as titular organist at the Église de la Sainte-Trinité, Paris, holding this position from 1993 to 2008. Before this, he was titular organist at the Sacré-Cœur basilica in the same city from 1985 to 1993, succeeding Daniel Roth.

Hakim's numerous improvisations and compositions for organ, orchestra, and other instruments have received renown. His works have been published by Schott Music, UMP, Combre, Éditions Alphonse Leduc, ABRSM, Fitzsimons, Éditions Gérard Billaudot, and American Carillon.

== Biography ==
=== Youth: 1955–1972 ===
Naji Subhy Paul Irénée Hakim was born into a Catholic family on 31 October 1955 in Beirut, Lebanon; to a businessman father, Subhy (died 2022), and his wife Katy Hakim. His Christian name is Paul.

His family were music-loving: his father played the mandolin and sang; his mother is an amateur pianist, and he and his three siblings also studied a variety of instruments of different types. Before the organ, Hakim studied the cello.

When he was five, he heard a pipe organ in his school, the Collège du Sacré-Coeur of Beirut. The instrument was built by Debierre-Gloton. Impressed by its sound, Hakim asked his mother two years later to get him a piano, to which she obliged. From then on, Hakim received his first piano lessons from his mother, who self-taught.

His brother, Amine, noticed the then-9 year old Hakim's enthusiasm for the organ and helped him break into the organ loft at the college. Naji was able to pull out all of the organ's stops before playing a single note. Frightened by the sound, the two brothers ran away. The school director took notice of the incident and ordered for the loft to be re-secured.

Hakim, who received permission to practise for half an hour every week (and later received unlimited access to the organ loft, chapel, and campus of the school for practising, under the consent of a new director), then taught himself the organ by using the method books of Jacques-Nicolas Lemmens, Harold Gleason and Marcel Dupré. He would later give his first recital in this chapel aged 15. A year later, he would later master the third of Dupré's Trois préludes et fugues, op. 7, and César Franck's First Chorale in E major.

=== Studies: 1972–1980 ===
Many had noticed the young man's prodigiousness in the organ and talent for music, however, due to the prompting of his father, Hakim, aged 16, entered the Ecole Supérieure d'Ingénieurs de Beyrouth in 1972. He was advised that a musical career in Lebanon would have not been suitable by the present circumstances. The outbreak of the Lebanese Civil War in 1975, which caused the closure of his engineering school, forced him to flee to Paris in autumn of that year, where he completed his studies at Télécom in 1977.

He also took up a position as substitute organist at Sainte-Odile in Paris and prepared to enter the Conservatoire de Paris, failing the entrance examinations in 1976. Hakim then met Jean Langlais (1907–1991), organist of Sainte-Clotilde and an esteemed composer and organist, and began private lessons in organ playing and improvisation with him in a relationship that lasted about ten years. With his newfound friendship and encouragement, he was able to enter the conservatoire the following year; where he obtained seven first prizes in organ performance, organ improvisation, harmony, counterpoint, fugue, analysis, and orchestration.

Hakim was in the classes of Rolande Falcinelli (organ and improvisation), Roger Boutry (harmony), Jean-Claude Henry (counterpoint), Marcel Bitsch (fugue), Jacques Castérède (analysis) and Serge Nigg (orchestration); as well as that of Langlais himself (organ).

=== Professional career: 1980–2019 ===
He was appointed as titular organist of the Basilique du Sacré-Cœur, Paris in 1985, succeeding Daniel Roth. He left in 1993 when he succeeded Olivier Messiaen after the latter's death at the Église de la Sainte-Trinité, Paris, from 1993 until 2008. He serves as Professor of Musical Analysis at the Conservatoire National de Région de Boulogne-Billancourt, and visiting professor of organ, improvisation, analysis, and composition at the Royal Academy of Music, London.

Hakim's compositional output includes instrumental music, symphonic music, and choral music. His works for the organ includes more than three dozen solo pieces, a number of works for organ and other instruments, and four organ concertos with orchestra.

=== Present day: 2019– ===
Despite retiring from the academic scene, Hakim remains an active professional concert organist today.

== Awards ==
Hakim has won many awards for performance, improvisation, and composition. For example, his Symphonie en trois mouvements won the composition prize of the "Amis de l'Orgue" in 1984. The Embrace of Fire won first prize in 1986 in the International Organ Competition in memory of Anton Heiller, at Southern Missionary College in Collegedale, Tennessee. In addition, he was awarded the Prix de Composition Musicale André Caplet from the Académie des Beaux Arts in 1991. He has also been the recipient of prizes at the International Organ Competitions held in Beauvaiss (1981), Haarlem (1982), Lyon, Nuremberg, St. Albans (1983) (where he has since served on the jury), Chartres (1984), Strasbourg, and Rennes.

- 2002: Honorary doctorate from the Holy Spirit University of Kaslik, Lebanon
- 2007: Pope Benedict XVI conferred on him the "Pro Ecclesia et Pontifice" medal

== Personal life ==
He currently lives in Bayonne with his wife Marie-Bernadette Dufourcet (who he married in 1980), annually visits his homeland of Lebanon, and composes regularly.

They have two children, Jean-Paul, who has followed in his footsteps as a composer, and Katia-Sofia, a musicologist and poet.

Hakim is a polyglot and speaks six languages: French, Arabic, English, Basque, Spanish, and German.

== Music ==
Hakim began composing in 1983.

=== Organ solo ===
- Cosmogonie (composed 1983. Unpublished.)
- Petite suite (composed 1983. Waltham Abbey, Essex: UMP, 2004)
- Symphonie en Trois Mouvements (composed 1984. Paris: Combre, 1984)
- The Embrace of Fire: Triptyque (composed 1986. Paris: Combre, 1986)
- Hommage à Igor Stravinsky. Triptyque (composed 1986. Paris: Leduc, 1990)
- Expressions (composed 1988. Chicago, Illinois (USA): H. T. FitzSimons, 1988)
- Memor (composed 1989. London: UMP, 1990)
- Rubaiyat (composed 1990. London: UMP, 1991)
- Variations on two themes: "Old hundredth" & "Donne secours" (composed 1991. London: UMP, 1991)
- Rhapsody for organ duo (composed 1992. Waltham Abbey, Essex: UMP, 2005)
- Mariales (composed 1993. London: UMP, 1993)
  - Incantation
  - Pastorale
  - Antienne
  - Hymne
  - Danse
- Le Tombeau d'Olivier Messiaen: Trois Méditations symphoniques (composed 1993. London: UMP, 1994)
- Vexilla regis prodeunt (composed 1994. Paris: Leduc, 1995)
- Canticum (composed 1995. London: UMP, 1996)
- Sinfonia in honore Sancti Ioannis Baptistæ (composed 1996. London: UMP, 1997)
- Pange lingua (composed 1996. Paris: Leduc, 1997)
  - Pange lingua
  - Nobis datus
  - In supremœ nocte cœnœ
  - Verbum caro
  - Tantum ergo
  - Genitori, genitoque
- Te Deum (composed 1997. London: UMP, 1998)
- Bagatelle (composed 1997. London: UMP, 1998)
- Chant de Joie (composed 1997. London: UMP, 1998)
- The Last Judgment (composed 1999. Paris, Leduc, 2000)
- Quatre Études-Caprices for pedal solo (composed 2000. Paris: Leduc, 2001)
- Gershwinesca (composed 2000. Mainz: Schott, 2008)
- In Organo, Chordis et Choro (composed 2001. Paris. Leduc, 2002)
- Le Bien-aimé: Suite symphonique (composed 2001. Paris: Leduc, 2002)
  1. J'ai trouvé celui que mon cœur aime
  2. Notre joie et notre allégresse
  3. Viens, mon Bien-Aimé
  4. Avant que souffle la brise du jour
  5. Son aspect est celui du Liban, sans rival, comme les cèdres
  6. Ses traits sont des traits de feu
  7. Voici qu'il arrive sautant sur les montagnes, bondissant sur les collines
- Ouverture Libanaise (composed 2001. Paris: Leduc, 2004)
- Agapê (composed 2001. London: UMP, 2002)
- Bach'orama: Organ Fantasia on themes by Johann Sebastian Bach (composed 2003. Paris, Leduc, 2004)
- Gregoriana (composed 2003. Paris: Leduc, 2004)
- Salve Regina (composed 2004. Mainz: Schott, 2005)
- Sakskøbing præludier (composed 2005. Paris: Combre, 2006)
  1. Mit hjerte altid vanker (Always my heart wanders to the birth place of Jesus)
  2. Nærmere, Gud, til dig (Nearer, my God, to Thee)
  3. O Gud, du ved og kender (O God, Thou knowest)
  4. At sige verden ret farvel (The last farewell to life on earth)
  5. Hil dig, Frelser og Forsoner! (Hail You, Saviour and Atoner)
  6. Den mørke nat forgangen er (The gloomy night to morning yields)
  7. Nu blomstertiden kommer (Now the flowers are blooming)
  8. Påskeblomst! (Paschal Flow'r! why do you care to come forth?)
  9. Op, al den ting, som Gud har gjort (Arise, all things that God has made)
  10. O kristelighed! (O thou, image of Christ!)
  11. Så vældigt det mødte os først i vor dåb (How wonderful, that the Word first met us in baptism)
  12. Befal du dine veje (Commit thy way [unto God])
- Mit seinem Geist: Variations on "Ein feste Burg" (composed 2006. Mainz: Schott, 2007)
- Aalaiki'ssalaam: Variations on a Lebanese theme (composed 2006. Mainz: Schott, 2007)
- Esquisses Grégoriennes en forme de Messe basse (composed 2006. Mainz: Schott, 2007)
  1. Nos autem (Entrée)
  2. Ave maris stella (Offertoire)
  3. Pater noster (Élévation)
  4. Ave verum (Communion)
  5. O filii et filiae (Sortie)
- Hommage à Jean Langlais (composed 2006. Mainz: Schott, 2008)
- Glenalmond Suite (composed 2007. Waltham Abbey, Essex: UMP, 2007)
  1. Strømmende
  2. Favnende
  3. Smilende
  4. Jublende
- To call my true love to my dance (composed 2007. Mainz: Schott, 2009)
  1. Theme
  2. Cantabile
  3. Valse
  4. Deciso
  5. Arabesque
  6. Burletta
  7. Tango
  8. Scherzando
  9. Berceuse
  10. Finale
- All my founts shall be within you (Alle mine kilder skal være hos dig) (composed 2007. Mainz: Schott, 2009)
- I Love The Colourful World (Ich liebe diese farbenreiche Welt, Jeg elsker den brogede verden)(composed 2008. Mainz: Schott, 2009):
  1. Präludium
  2. Tanz-Toccata
- Arabesques (composed 2009. Unpublished.):
  1. Prélude
  2. Pastorale
  3. Libanaise
  4. Arabesque
  5. Litanie
  6. Rondeau
- Amazing Grace for organ (and soprano ad libitum) (composed 2009. Unpublished.)
- Ein Haus voll Glorie schauet, variations on the hymn "Ein Haus voll Glorie schauet" (2017)

=== Organ with other instruments ===
- Old Hundredth for brass and organ (composed 1983. Paris: Leduc, 1995)
- Fantaisie sur "Adeste, Fideles" with 2nd organ ad libitum (composed 1986. Paris: Bornemann/Leduc, 1988)
- Duo Concertant for organ and piano (or two pianos) (composed 1988. London: UMP, 1990)
- Rondo for Christmas for trumpet and organ (composed 1988. London: UMP, 1990)
- Hymne au Sacré-Cœur for 7 trumpets and organ (composed 1992. Paris: Leduc, 1995)
- Sonate for trumpet and organ (composed 1994. London: UMP, 1995)
- Suite Rhapsodique for horn and organ (composed 2002. London: UMP, 2002)
- Capriccio for violin and organ (composed 2005. London: UMP, 2005)
- Variations on "Wie schön leuchtet der Morgenstern" for oboe and organ (composed 2008. Mainz: Schott, 2009)
- Sindbad, Fantasy on Omani Popular Songs (Composed following a visit to Oman, 2014)

=== Orchestral and concertos ===
- Fantaisie Celtique for piano and orchestra (composed 1985. London: UMP, 1997)
- Concerto for organ and strings (composed 1988. London: UMP)
- Les Noces de l'Agneau: Trois tableaux symphoniques for orchestra (composed 1996. London: UMP, 1997)
- Hymne de l'Univers for orchestra (composed 1997. London: UMP, 1998)
- Seattle Concerto for organ and orchestra (composed 2000. London: UMP, 2000)
- Concerto for violin and orchestra (composed 2002. Paris: Leduc)
- Concerto No. 3 for organ and string orchestra (composed 2003. London: UMP)
- Ouverture Libanaise for orchestra (composed 2004. Paris: Leduc, 2004)
- Sakskøbing præludier for chamber ensemble (flute, clarinet, bassoon, harp, violin, viola, and cello) (composed 2005. Paris: Combre, 2006)
  1. Mit hjerte altid vanker (Always my heart wanders to the birth place of Jesus)
  2. Nærmere, Gud, til dig (Nearer, my God, to Thee)
  3. O Gud, du ved og kender (O God, Thou knowest)
  4. At sige verden ret farvel (The last farewell to life on earth)
  5. Hil dig, Frelser og Forsoner! (Hail You, Saviour and Atoner)
  6. Den mørke nat forgangen er (The gloomy night to morning yields)
  7. Nu blomstertiden kommer (Now the flowers are blooming)
  8. Påskeblomst! (Paschal Flow'r! why do you care to come forth?)
  9. Op, al den ting, som Gud har gjort (Arise, all things that God has made)
  10. O kristelighed! (O thou, image of Christ!)
  11. Så vældigt det mødte os først i vor dåb (How wonderful, that the Word first met us in baptism)
  12. Befal du dine veje (Commit thy way [unto God])
- Påskeblomst for string orchestra (composed 2005. Waltham Abbey, Essex: UMP)
- Concerto No. 4 for organ and chamber ensemble "Det strømmende og uudslukkelige..." (composed 2007. Paris: Combre)

=== Other instruments and chamber music ===
- Prélude et Fugue for bassoon quartet (composed 1983. London: UMP)
- Shasta: Suite for harpsichord (composed 1986. Cleveland, Ohio (USA): Ludwig Music 1988)
- Divertimento for guitar quartet (composed 1987. London: UMP)
- Jeu for harp solo (composed 1987. Paris: G. Billaudot, 1990)
- Sonate for violin solo (composed 1994. Paris: Leduc, 1996)
- Caprice en Rondeau for flute and piano (composed 1998. Paris: Leduc, 1999)
- Sonate for violin and piano (composed 2000. Paris: Leduc, 2002)
- Dumia for piano solo (composed 2001. London: Associated Board of the Royal Schools of Music, 2001)
- Ouverture Libanaise for piano solo (composed 2001. Paris: Leduc, 2004)
- Påskeblomst for string quartet (composed 2007. Waltham Abbey, Essex: UMP)
- Kammerconcert "Solen skinner altid på Beirut" for flute, clarinet, bassoon, harp, piano, violin, viola and cello (composed 2008. Paris: Leduc
- Aalaiki'ssalaam: Variations on a Lebanese theme for piano solo (composed 2006. Paris: Leduc, 2009; Schott)
- Glenalmond Suite for piano solo (composed 2007. Waltham Abbey, Essex: UMP, 2009)
  1. Strømmende
  2. Favnende
  3. Smilende
  4. Jublende
- Hymne til Alberto Giacomettis Kvinde på Kærre for carillon (composed 2009. Unpublished.)

=== Vocal works ===
- Saul de Tarse: Oratorio for choir, soloists and orchestra (composed 1991. Paris: Leduc, 2000)
- Missa resurrectionis for soprano solo (composed 1994. London: UMP, 1995)
- Missa redemptionis for SATB choir a capella (composed 1995. London: UMP, 1995)
- Phèdre: Cantata for mezzo-soprano and piano (composed 1997. London: UMP, 1998)
- Children for SATB choir a capella (composed 1999. London: UMP, 1999)
- Messe Solennelle for choir and organ (with 2nd organ ad libitum) (composed 1999. London: UMP, 1999)
- Magnificat for soprano, violin and organ (composed 1999. Paris: Leduc, 2002)
- Gloria for choir and organ (composed 2002. London: UMP, 2002)
- Ave maris stella for choir and organ (composed 2003. London: UMP, 2003)
- Phèdre for mezzo-soprano and orchestra (composed 2004. London: UMP)
- The Dove for tenor and string quartet (composed 2005. Mainz: Schott, 2006)
- The Dove for tenor (or soprano) and organ (composed 2005. Mainz: Schott, 2006)
- The Dove for tenor and string orchestra (composed 2005. Mainz: Schott, 2005)
- Jesu Redemptor omnium for choir, brass quintet, timpani and percussion (composed 2005. London: UMP)
- Det strømmende: Canon (composed 2005. Unpublished.)
- Magnificat for three treble voices and organ (composed 2006. Mainz: Schott, 2008)
- Nunc dimittis for three treble voices and organ (composed 2006. Mainz: Schott, 2008)
- Magnificat for soprano and organ (composed 2006. Mainz: Schott, 2008)
- Verbum caro factum est for three treble voices and organ (composed 2007. Mainz: Schott, 2008)
- The Angel Cried (Megalynarion of Pascha) for SATB choir and congregation (composed 2007. Mainz: Schott, 2008)
- Set Me As A Seal Upon Your Heart (Læg mig som en seglring ved dit hjerte) for SATB choir a cappella (composed 2008. Mainz: Schott, 2009)
- Amazing Grace for soprano (ad libitum) and organ (composed 2009. Unpublished.)

== Discography ==
- Naji Hakim plays Naji Hakim, Signum Records. OCLC 937872561, OCLC 993583475
- Naji Hakim : Seattle Concerto for organ, Marie-Bernadette Dufourcet, organ; Seattle Symphony Orchestra dir. Gerard Schwarz, Ifo Records. OCLC 725084225
- Naji Hakim : Piano works, Nicolas Chevereau, piano, Rejoyce Classique.
