= Hoch sei gepriesen unser Gott =

Christian hymn by Maria Luise Thurmair

- Christian hymn
- English: "High praise be to our God"
- Written: 1985
- Text: by Maria Luise Thurmair
- Language: German
- Based on: Benedictus
- Melody: by Guillaume Franc
- Composed: 1543

"Hoch sei gepriesen unser Gott" ("High praise be to our God") is a Christian hymn by Maria Luise Thurmair, based on the Benedictus canticle and set to a 1543 melody by Guillaume Franc. The hymn in three stanzas of eight lines was written in 1985. It appeared in the Catholic hymnal Gotteslob in 2013.

== History ==
Maria Luise Thurmair wrote "Hoch sei gepriesen unser Gott" in 1985. It is a close paraphrase of the Benedictus, written to match a 1543 melody by Guillaume Franc. The hymn is in three stanzas of eight lines each.

It appeared in the Catholic hymnal Gotteslob, as GL 384, in the section "Lob, Dank und Anbetung" (Praise, thanks and adoration).

== Tune and settings ==
The melody of "Hoch sei gepriesen unser Gott" by Guillaume Franc, is in bar form. It rises an octave up within the first five notes. Michael Funke composed a cantata for mixed choir and organ based on the hymn, setting all three stanzas differently.
