= Joseph Hermann Mohr =

German Catholic priest and hymn writer

Joseph Mohr
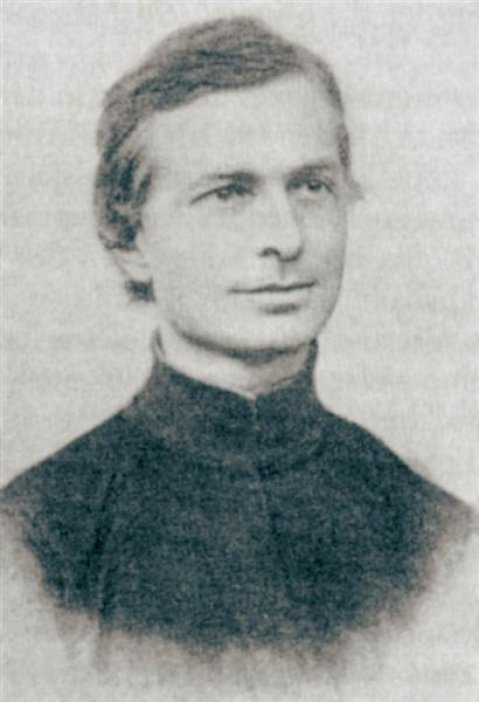
- Mohr as a young priest
- Born: Joseph Hermann Mohr; 10 January 1834; Siegburg
- Died: 7 February 1892 (aged 58); Munich
- Occupations: Catholic priest; Hymn writer; Hymnologist
- Organizations: Society of Jesus

Joseph Hermann Mohr (10 January 1834 – 7 February 1892) was a German Catholic priest, a Jesuit, hymn writer, and hymnologist. He was a member of the Society of Jesus. When all its institutions were closed due to the Jesuits Law of 1872, he left Germany. He returned in 1882 and worked as a hymnologist.

Mohr published several hymnals, promoting the return of Gregorian chant in Latin to the church liturgy, but writing German hymns intended for events beyond mass, such as processions. He is known for his hymn "Ein Haus voll Glorie schauet" which follows models of military marches. It appears in modern hymnals, however with modified text.

== Career ==
Mohr was born in Siegburg, where his father was a teacher at the elementary school. He studied philosophy and theology at the Bonn University from 1852. In 1853, he became a member of the Society of Jesus in Münster. After the completion of his studies, he taught at the order's college in Feldkirch until 1862. From 1863, he studied rhetoric in Munich and theology in Maria Laach. He was consecrated as a priest in 1866.

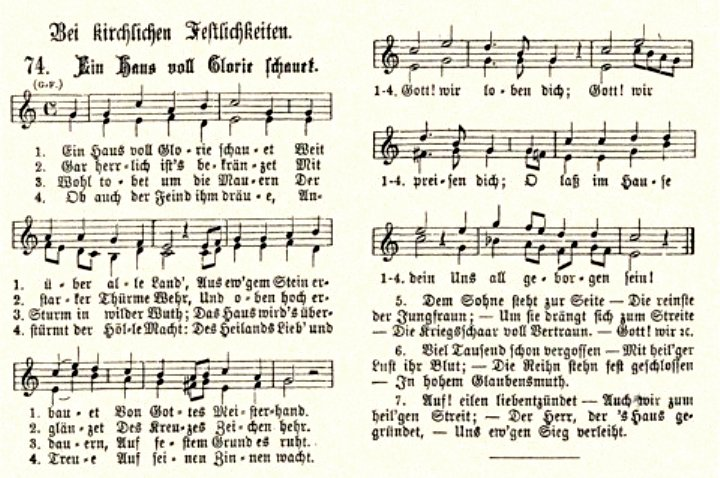
"Ein Haus voll Glorie", Mohr's original text and melody

The Jesuits were restricted during the Kulturkampf by the Jesuits Law of 1872. As all Jesuit institutions in Germany were dissolved, Mohr left Germany for Jesuit societies in France and Belgium. During this time, he wrote text and melody of his hymn "Ein Haus voll Glorie schauet". In his hometown, tradition has it that he was inspired by the Abbey on top of a mountain, overlooking the region. Its melody, especially its rhythm, is influenced by military marches. His best-known hymn, it is part of modern hymnals, but only the first of his seven stanzas was included in the Catholic hymnal Gotteslob of 1975, with four new stanzas by Hans W. Marx.

Mohr considered the "Schönheit des Gregorianischen Chorals" (beauty of Gregorian chant as the appropriate music for the celebration of mass. He joined an association for its studies, the Verein zur Erforschung alter Choralhandschriften behufs Wiederherstellung des cantus S. Gregorii of the music director at the Trier Cathedral, Michael Hermesdorff. The association fostered the restoration of Gregorian singing in Germany, with members such as Robert Eitner, François-Auguste Gevaert, and Joseph Pothier. Mohr recommended congregational singing for other church events, such as meditation (Andacht) and processions, and wrote a handbook to improve the quality of singing. He composed the melody of "Maria, breit den Mantel aus" which is preferred in the Rhineland, a new melody of Christoph Bernhard Verspoell's "Dir jubeln Engelchöre", and a new melody of Johann Georg Franz Braun's "Heilig bist du, großer Gott", which appear in the Catholic hymnal.

As the Jesuits Law was still in effect, he left the Society of Jesus in order to return to Germany in 1882. He worked as a hymnologist in Cologne, Regensburg, and finally in Munich until his death. The Josef-Mohr-Straße in Siegburg was named for him.

== Works ==
- Cantate, hymnal, Kösel & Pustet, Regensburg, 1873 (95th edition 1922)
- Cäcilia, hymnal, Verlag Friedrich Pustet, Regensburg (1862), New York and Cincinnati (1874), 36th edition 1927
- Jubilate Deo!, four-part edition of Cäcilia, 1877
- Anleitung zur kirchlichen Psalmodie, 1878
- Lasset uns beten, hymnal for the dioceses of Würzburg, Salzburg, Bamberg, Speyer, 1881
- Cantiones Sacrae: a collection of hymns and devotional chants for the different seasons of the year, the feasts of our Lord, of the Blessed Virgin, of the saints, low masses etc.: arranged for four mixed voices. Ratisbon: F. Pustet 1878 (Digitalisat).
- Die Pflege des Volksgesanges in der Kirche, Verlag Friedrich Pustet, Regensburg, New York und Cincinnati, 1885
- Psälterlein, Diözesangesangbuch Basel/Freiburg (Br.), 1891 urn:urn:nbn:de:hbz:6:1-183802:{{{2}}}

== Sources ==
- Hans-Peter Bähr: "... o mög das Lob von allen dir wohlgefällig sein!" Zu Leben und Werk des Siegburgers Joseph Mohr. in: Mauritius Mittler, Wolfgang Herborn: Temporibus tempora. Festschrift für Abt Placidus Mittler. Siegburg 1995, pp 331–365.
- Bernd Distelkamp: "Ein Haus voll Glorie schauet..." Zum 175. Geburtstag des Kirchenliedkomponisten Joseph Mohr in: Heimatblätter des Rhein-Sieg-Kreises, 77. Jahrgang 2009. Ed. for Geschichts- und Altertumsverein für Siegburg und den Rhein-Sieg-Kreis by H. Fischer, W. Herborn und A. Korte-Böger, Rheinlandia Verlag, Siegburg 2009, ISBN 978-3-938535-57-8, pp 146–165.
- Bernd Distelkamp: "Ein Haus voll Glorie schauet..." Der Siegburger Kirchenliedkomponist Joseph Mohr (= Siegburger Blätter, Heft 21). Siegburg 2009 (online; PDF; 429 kB).
- Kurt Küppers (1994). "Mohr, Joseph". Neue Deutsche Biographie (in German). Vol. 17. Berlin: Duncker & Humblot. pp. 710–711. (.html full text online).
- Distelkamp, Bernd (2009). ""Ein Haus voll Glorie schauet..." Der Siegburger Kirchenliedkomponist Joseph Mohr" (PDF). Siegburger Blätter (in German).
