= I Love The Colourful World =

2008 organ composition by Naji Hakim

- Composition by Naji Hakim
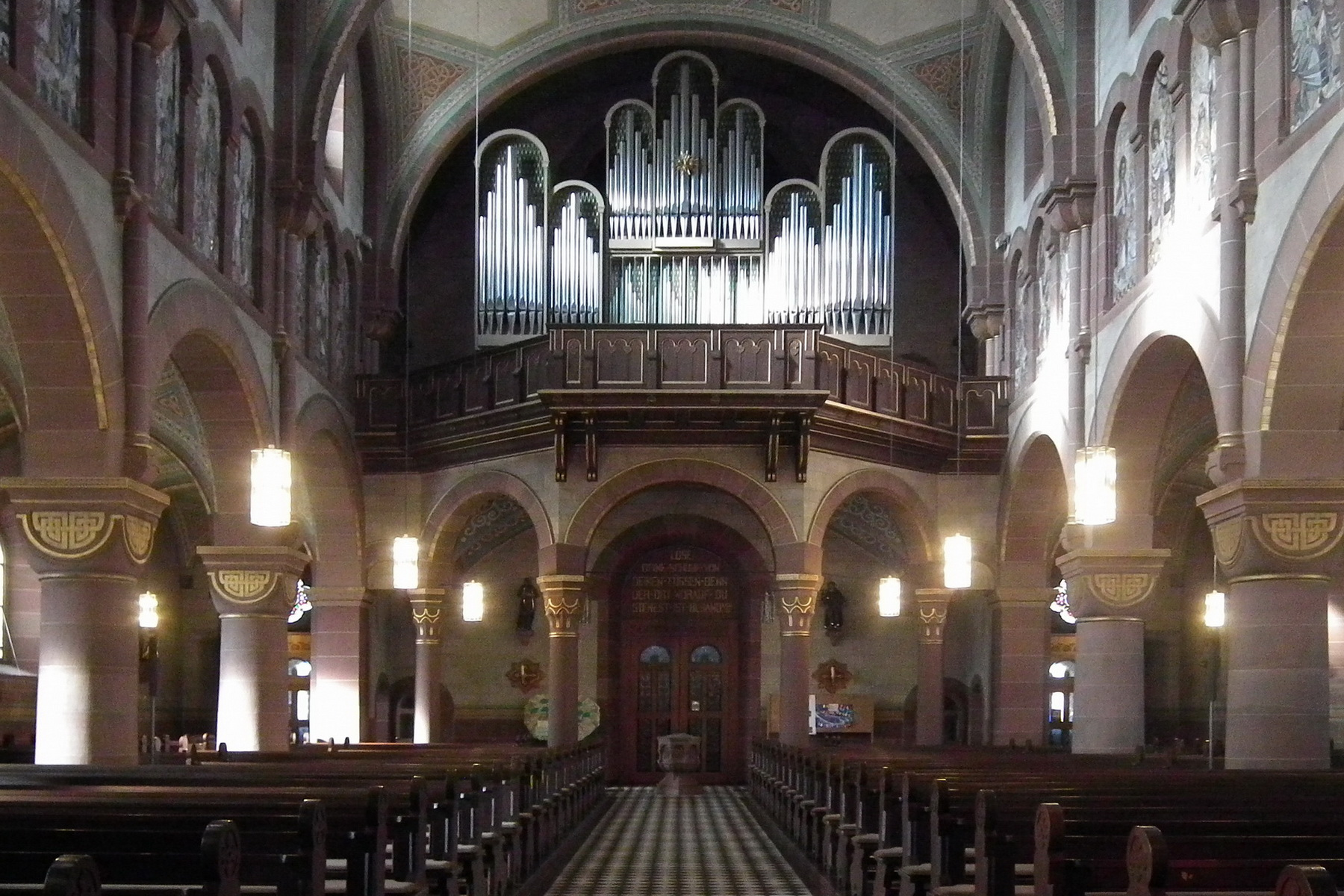
- Organ in St. Alban, Hardheim, were the piece was premiered
- Performed: 27 June 2008: St. Alban, Hardheim
- Duration: 7:30 minutes
- Movements: 2
- Scoring: organ

I Love The Colourful World is a composition for organ in two movements by Naji Hakim, written in 2008. The premiere was played on 27 June 2008 at St. Alban in Hardheim. It was published by Schott.

== History ==
Hakim composed I Love The Colourful World in 2008 when he was organist at Sainte-Trinité in Paris. He wrote it for organ builder Hans-Georg Vleugels and the organ of the Catholic church of St. Alban in Hardheim, Germany, and dedicated it to them.

Hakim set the composition in two movements, Prelude (Praeludium) and Dance Toccata (Tanz-Toccata). The world premiere was played in Hardheim on 27 June 2008. The piece was published by Schott, giving a duration of 7:30 minutes.
