= Francesco Giorgi =

Italian Franciscan (1466–1540)

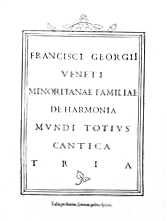
De harmonia mundi totius.

Francesco Giorgi Veneto (1466–1540) was an Italian Franciscan friar, and author of the work De harmonia mundi totius from 1525. In it, Giorgio proposed an idea of the Universe created according to the universal system of proportion, which may be studied as laws of mathematics used by architects. The Cambridge History of Renaissance Philosophy describes him as 'idiosyncratic'. He wrote also In Scripturam Sacram Problemata (1536).

Giorgi is extensively discussed in Frances Yates, The Occult Philosophy in the Elizabethan Age

That Giorgi was a Christian Cabalist is a statement that means, not merely that he was influenced vaguely by the Cabalist literature, but that he believed that Cabala could prove, or already had proved, the truth of Christianity.

She also discusses Shakespeare's The Merchant of Venice in the light of the theory of Daniel Banes that Shakespeare was familiar with Giorgi's and related writings on the Cabala.

A copy of De harmonia mundi is listed as once in the Library of Sir Thomas Browne. It is possible that Browne's copy was bequeathed to him from Arthur Dee. John Dee is also known to have possessed a copy of Giorgi's work.

== Bibliography ==
- Francesco Zorzi, L'armonia del mondo, a cura di Saverio Campanini, testo latino a fronte, coll. "Il Pensiero Occidentale", Bompiani, Milano 2010.
- Francesco Giorgio Veneto, De harmonia mundi, pref. Cesare Vasoli, Lavis-Firenze, La Finestra editrice-Biblioteca Nazionale Centrale di Firenze, 2008, ISBN 978-88-88097-75-6; ISSN 1973-1337.
- Saverio Campanini, Francesco Giorgio’s Criticism of the Vulgata: Hebraica Veritas or Mendosa Traductio? in G. Busi (ed.), Hebrew to Latin, Latin to Hebrew. The Mirroring of Two Cultures in the Age of Humanism, Berlin Studies in Judaism 1, Nino Aragno Editore, Turin 2006, pp. 206–231.
- Saverio Campanini, Ein unbekannter Kommentar zum „Hohelied“ aus der kabbalistischen Schule von Francesco Zorzi: Edition und Kommentar, in G. Frank – A. Hallacker – S. Lalla (edd.), Erzählende Vernunft, Akademie Verlag, Berlin 2006, pp. 265–281.
- Saverio Campanini, Le fonti ebraiche del De Harmonia mundi di Francesco Zorzi, in «Annali di Ca' Foscari», XXXVIII, 3 (1999), pp. 29–74.
- Saverio Campanini, Haophan betoc haophan. La struttura simbolica del De Harmonia mundi di Francesco Zorzi, in «Materia Giudaica», 3 (1997), pp. 13–17.
- Giulio Busi, Francesco Zorzi. A Methodical Dreamer, in The Christian Kabbalah. Jewish Mystical Books and their Christian Interpreters, edited by J. Dan, Cambridge (Ma.), Harvard University Press, 1997, p. 97-125.
- Alfonso Vesentini Argento "Le due Chiese". Architettura religiosa del Rinascimento tra fede politica e scienza. Apostrofo Editore Cremona Press maggio 2021 ISBN 9788897819578
