= Christian Kabbalah =

Christian interpretation of Kabbalah

Christian Kabbalah arose during the Renaissance due to Christian scholars' interest in the mysticism of Jewish Kabbalah, which they interpreted according to Christian theology. Often spelled Cabala to distinguish it from the Jewish form and from Hermetic Qabalah, it sought to link Kabbalistic concepts with Christian doctrines, particularly the Trinity. Early proponents included Giovanni Pico della Mirandola and Johann Reuchlin, who adapted Kabbalistic ideas to Christian beliefs, sometimes using them as a tool for conversion.

The movement drew from earlier Christian interest in Jewish mysticism, including the work of Spanish conversos and scholars, though it gained prominence in the 15th and 16th centuries. Christian Kabbalists proposed interpretations that linked Jesus and Mary to the Sefirot and saw hidden Christian messages in Kabbalistic texts. Figures such as Athanasius Kircher and Christian Knorr von Rosenroth further expanded these ideas, influencing later esoteric traditions.

By the 18th century, Christian Kabbalah had largely faded from mainstream theology, though it persisted in European occultism. Some later attempts were made to revive interest, particularly through interpretations of the Gospel of John, but it remained outside traditional Christian thought. Today, Christian Kabbalah is primarily studied as a historical and esoteric movement that bridged Jewish mysticism and Christian theological speculation.

== Background ==
The movement was influenced by a desire to interpret aspects of Christianity even more mystically than contemporary Christian mystics. Greek Neoplatonic documents came into Europe after Constantinople fell to Mehmed II. Neoplatonism had been prevalent in Christian Europe and had entered into Scholasticism since the translation of Greek and Hebrew texts in Spain in the 13th century. The Renaissance trend was a relatively short-lived phenomenon, ending by 1750.

Christian scholars interpreted Kabbalistic ideas from "a distinctly Christian perspective, linking Jesus Christ, His atonement, and His resurrection to the Ten Sefirot" – the upper three Sephirot to the hypostases of the Trinity and the other seven "to the lower or earthly world". Alternatively, they "would make Kether the Creator (or the Spirit), Hokhmah the Father, and Binah – the supernal mother – Mary", which placed her "on a divine level with God, something the orthodox churches have always refused to do". Christian Kabbalists sought to transform Kabbalah into "a dogmatic weapon to turn back against the Jews to compel their conversion – starting with Ramon Llull", whom Harvey J. Hames called "the first Christian to acknowledge and appreciate kabbalah as a tool of conversion", though Llull was not a Kabbalist himself nor versed in Kabbalah. Later Christian Kabbalah is mostly based on Pico della Mirandola, Johann Reuchlin and Paolo Riccio.

After the 18th century, Kabbalah became blended with European occultism, some of which had a religious basis; however, the main interest in Christian Kabbalah was by then dead. A few attempts have been made to revive it in recent decades, particularly regarding the alleged Neoplatonism of the first two chapters of the Gospel of John, but it has not entered into mainstream Christianity.

== Medieval precursors ==
=== Spanish conversos ===
An early expression of Christian Kabbalah was among the Spanish conversos from Judaism, from the late 13th century to the Expulsion from Spain of 1492. These include Abner of Burgos and Pablo de Heredia. Heredia's Epistle of Secrets is "the first recognizable work of Christian Kabbalah", and was quoted by Pietro Galatino who influenced Athanasius Kircher. However, Heredia's Kabbalah consists of quotes from non-existent Kabbalistic works, and distorted or fake quotes from real Kabbalistic sources.

== Christian Kabbalists ==
=== Pico della Mirandola ===
Among the first to promote aspects of Kabbalah beyond exclusively Jewish circles was Giovanni Pico della Mirandola (1463–1494), a student of Marsilio Ficino at his Florentine Academy. His syncretic world-view combined Platonism, Neoplatonism, Aristotelianism, Hermeticism and Kabbalah.

=== Johann Reuchlin ===
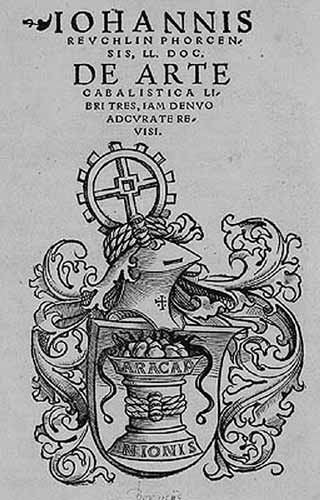
Title of Reuchlin's De arte cabalistica libri tres, iam denua adcurate revisi, 1530.

Johann Reuchlin, a Catholic humanist (1455–1522), was "Pico's most important follower". His main sources for Kabbalah were Menahem Recanati (Commentary on the Torah, Commentary on the Daily Prayers) and Joseph Gikatilla (Sha'are Orah, Ginnat 'Egoz). Reuchlin argued that human history divides into three periods: a natural period in which God revealed Himself as Shaddai (שדי), the period of the Torah in which God "revealed Himself to Moses through the four-lettered name of the Tetragrammaton" (יהוה), and the period of Christian spiritual rule of the earth which is known in Christianity as "the redemption." It was asserted that the five-letter name associated with this period is an altered version of the tetragrammaton with the additional letter shin (ש).

This name, Yahshuah (יהשוה for 'Jesus'), is also known as the pentagrammaton. It is an attempt by Christian theologians to read the name of the Christian deity into The unpronounced name of the Jewish God. The first of Reuchlin's two books on Kabbalah, De verbo mirifico, "speaks of the […] name of Jesus derived from the tetragrammaton". His second book, De arte cabalistica, is "a broader, more informed excursion into various kabbalistic concerns".

=== Francesco Giorgi ===
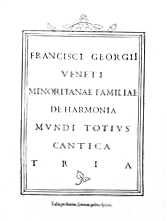
front page of Francesco Giorgi's De harmonia mundi.

Francesco Giorgi, (1467–1540) was a Venetian Franciscan friar and "has been considered a central figure in sixteenth-century Christian Kabbalah both by his contemporaries and by modern scholars". According to Giulio Busi, he was the most important Christian Kabbalist second to its founder Giovanni Pico della Mirandola. His, De harmonia mundi, was "a massive and curious book, all Hermetic, Platonic, Cabalistic, and Pinchian".

=== Paolo Riccio ===
Paolo Riccio (1506–1541) "unified the scattered dogmas of the Christian Cabala into an internally consistent system", based on Pico and Reuchlin and adding "to them through an original synthesis of kabbalistic and Christian sources".

=== Balthasar Walther ===
Balthasar Walther, (1558 – before 1630), was a Silesian physician. In 1598–1599, Walther undertook a pilgrimage to the Holy Land to learn about the intricacies of the Kabbalah and Jewish mysticism from groups in Safed and elsewhere, including amongst the followers of Isaac Luria. However, he did not follow the teachings of these Jewish authorities but later used his learning to further Christian theological pursuits. Despite his claim to have spent six years in these travels, it appears that he only made several shorter trips. Walther himself did not author any significant works of Christian Kabbalah but maintained a voluminous manuscript collection of magical and kabbalistic works. His significance for the history of Christian Kabbalah is that his ideas and doctrines exercised a profound influence on the works of the German theosopher, Jakob Böhme, in particular Böhme's Forty Questions on the Soul (c.1621).

=== Athanasius Kircher ===
The following century produced Athanasius Kircher, a German Jesuit priest, Hermeticist and polymath. He wrote extensively on the subject in 1652, elaborating on Mirandola's work on Kabbalah by bringing in further elements such as Orphism and Egyptian mythology to the mix in his work, Oedipus Aegyptiacus. It was illustrated by Kircher's adaptation of the Tree of Life. Kircher's version of the Tree of Life is still used in Hermetic Qabalah.

=== Sir Thomas Browne ===
The physician-philosopher Sir Thomas Browne (1605–82) is recognised as one of the few 17th century English scholars of the Kabbalah. Browne read Hebrew, owned a copy of Francesco Giorgio's highly influential work of Christian Kabbalah De harmonia mundi totius (1525), and alluded to the Kabbalah in his discourse The Garden of Cyrus and encyclopaedia Pseudodoxia Epidemica which was translated into German by the Hebrew scholar and promoter of the Kabbalah, Christian Knorr von Rosenroth.

=== Christian Knorr von Rosenroth ===
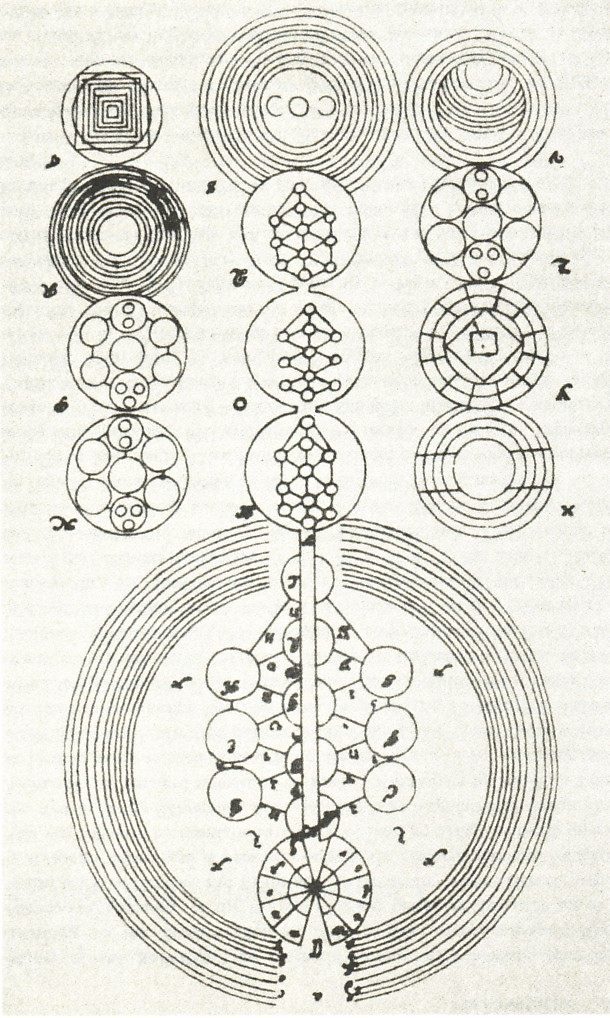
Sephirotic diagram from Knorr von Rosenroth's Kabbala Denudata.

Christian Knorr von Rosenroth, (1636–1689), became well known as a translator, annotator, and editor of Kabbalistic texts; he published the two-volume Kabbala denudata ('Kabbalah Unveiled' 1677–78), "which virtually alone represented authentic (Jewish) kabbalah to Christian Europe until the mid-nineteenth century". The Kabbala denudata contains Latin translations of, among others, sections of the Zohar, Pardes Rimmonim by Moses Cordovero, Sha’ar ha-Shamayim and Beit Elohim by Abraham Cohen de Herrera, Sefer ha-Gilgulim (a Lurianic tract attributed to Hayyim Vital), with commentaries by Knorr von Rosenroth and Henry More; some later editions include a summary of Christian Kabbalah (Adumbratio Kabbalæ Christianæ) by F. M. van Helmont.

=== Johan Kemper ===
Johan Kemper (1670–1716) was a Hebrew teacher, whose tenure at Uppsala University lasted from 1697 to 1716. He was Emanuel Swedenborg's probable Hebrew tutor.

Kemper, formerly known as Moses ben Aaron of Cracow, was a convert to Lutheranism from Judaism. During his time at Uppsala, he wrote his three-volume work on the Zohar entitled Matteh Mosche ('The Staff of Moses'). In it, he attempted to show that the Zohar contained the Christian doctrine of the Trinity.

This belief also drove him to make a literal translation of the Gospel of Matthew into Hebrew and to write a kabbalistic commentary on it.

== See also ==
- Emanation in the Eastern Orthodox Church
- Platonism in the Renaissance
