= Kündet allen in der Not =

- Christian hymn
- Occasion: Advent
- Written: 1971
- Text: by Friedrich Dörr
- Language: German
- Based on: Isaiah 35:1–10
- Melody: by Johann Rudolf Ahle
- Composed: 1662
- Published: 1975

"Kündet allen in der Not" (Tell all in need) is a Christian hymn with German text by Friedrich Dörr written in 1971 to a 1662 melody by Johann Rudolf Ahle. The song is part of the German Catholic hymnal Gotteslob.

== History ==
Friedrich Dörr wrote the text of "Kündet allen in der Not" in 1971. He was a Catholic theologian who was influential in the first common Catholic hymnal in German, Gotteslob of 1975. The song appeared in the 2013 edition as GL 221, in the section for Advent. In the Bavarian edition of the Protestant hymnal Evangelisches Gesangbuch, it is EG 540. It is part of several songbooks.

== Theme and music ==
The song is based on prophecies by Isaiah from chapter 35. It is in five stanzas of six lines each, with the last two lines a refrain, "Allen Menschen wird zuteil / Gottes Heil" (All people will receive / God's salvation). The first stanza calls to tell those in trouble to take courage and to trust. The second stanza says that God is near to free from guilt and grant peace. The following stanzas, closely related to the prophecy, refers to desert changing to fields, blind people seeing, mute people singing, deaf people hearing, and lame people jumping. The final stanza looks forward to suffering turned to a meal of bliss ("Mahl der Seligkeit").

The much older melody, composed by Johann Rudolf Ahle in 1662, was connected in 1704 to the hymn "Morgenglanz der Ewigkeit", which is a morning song that reflects eternal light.

Hermann Angstenberger composed a setting for four-part choir with organ and optional strings, published by Butz Verlag in 2016.

== Usage ==
The hymn is used as a song in services for Advent, both in mass as in penitential services (Bußgottesdienst). It has been a topic of sermons. The first line, a call to trust, was used by Hans-Josef Becker, the archbishop of Paderborn, in a letter to every member of the diocese at the end of 2018, after a difficult year.
