= Gelobt seist du, Herr Jesu Christ =

German hymn

- Christian hymn
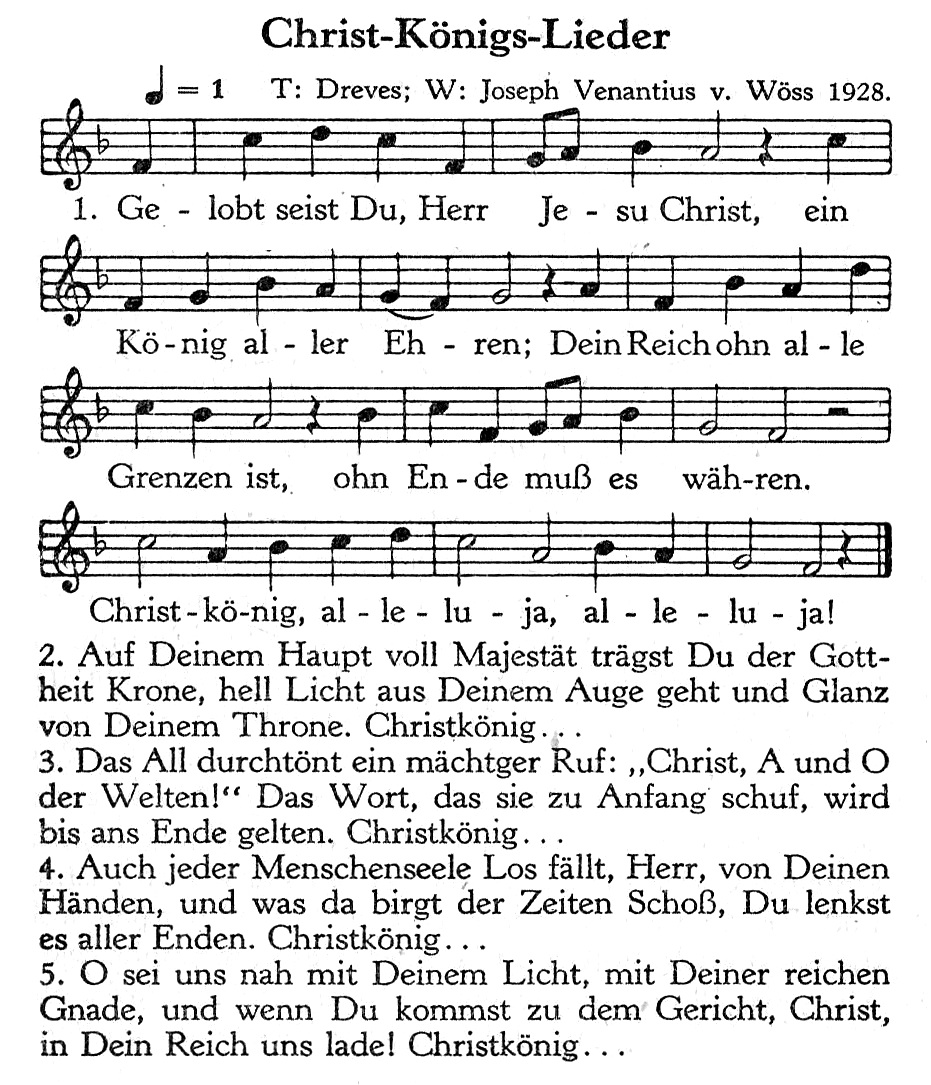
- A version in five stanzas in the Paderborn hymnal Sursum Corda
- Occasion: Feast of Christ the King
- Written: 1886
- Text: by Guido Maria Dreves
- Language: German
- Melody: by Josef Venantius von Wöss
- Composed: 1928

"Gelobt seist du, Herr Jesu Christ" (Praised be you, Lord Jesus Christ) is a Catholic hymn, addressing Jesus as the King. The five stanzas, composed in 1886, was written by the German Jesuit and hymnologist Guido Maria Dreves, and the melody was composed in 1928, three years after the introduction of the Feast of Christ the King, by the Austrian church musician Josef Venantius von Wöss.

== First publication ==
Dreves published the text in a collection of self-composed hymns entitled Kränze ums Kirchenjahr (Paderborn 1886). There, between an Himmelfahrts and several Pentecost Lieder, it is combined with two other hymns under the heading Von des Herren Königtum [Of the Lord's Kingship].

== Content ==
The five stanzas each consist of four lines with the rhyme scheme AB AB and describe Jesus Christ as the "King of all honours" and the "A and O of the worlds". The song begins with the eponymous praise "Praised be you, Lord Jesus Christ" and ends with the petitions "Be near us" and "into your kingdom invite us".

Unlike other Christ the King hymns, it does not emphasise Christ's victory over death, but rather his reign over time, space and life. In this context, the text is reminiscent of the Exultet from the liturgy of the Easter Vigil.

== Melody ==
The song melody by Josef Venantius von Wöss is composed in a major key and constantly alternates between a rhythm of two and a rhythm of three. The refrain verse "Christkönig, Halleluja, Halleluja." added as the fifth line to all verses consists of three measures of three.

The hymn is in this setting without the second verse, which deals with the crown of Christ and his throne, in the Gotteslob under number 375 and is also sung ecumenically.

== Arrangements ==
Arrangements of the Lied can be found among others at:

- Ludger Stühlmeyer, choral movement for mixed choir (SATB) from 1990
- Karl Norbert Schmid, movement for choir and winds (opus 39, 203)
