= Dank sei dir, Vater, für das ewge Leben =

Christian hymn

- Christian hymn
- English: Thanks be to you, Father, for Eternal Life
- Written: 1969
- Text: by Maria Luise Thurmair
- Language: German
- Melody: By Johann Crüger
- Composed: 1640

"Dank sei dir, Vater, für das ewge Leben" (Thanks be to you, Father, for Eternal Life) is a Christian hymn by Maria Luise Thurmair, set to a 1640 melody by Johann Crüger. The original melody stems from the song "Lobet den Herrn und dankt ihm seiner Gaben", a song of thanks after the Eucharist. The hymn in six stanzas of four lines was written in 1969, revised in 1987 and 1994. It is part of the current Gotteslob as GL 484, in the section "Kirche – Ökumene" (Church - Ecumene).

The lyrics begin with thanks for eternal life and faith. The second stanza reflects nourishment of all creatures by the Earth's crops, but also nourishment from Heaven. The focus of the third stanza is the unity of all who participate in the Eucharist, unity with Jesus and among each other. The fourth stanza compares the unity of those gathering with the one bread from many grain kernels. The fifth stanza prays for unity in faith and love, compared to the berries of one grape. The final stanza requests the church to be protected from evil, and the congregation to be sent as witnesses of God's love, to be completed.
