= Ein Danklied sei dem Herrn =

1928 Christian hymn with German text

- Christian hymn
- Key: C major
- Written: 1886
- Text: by Guido Maria Dreves
- Language: German
- Melody: by Josef Venantius von Wöss
- Composed: 1928

"Ein Danklied sei dem Herrn" (A song of thanks be to the Lord) is a Christian hymn with German text written by Guido Maria Dreves in 1886, and a melody written by Josef Venantius von Wöss in 1928. It is a song of thanks and praise of God who protects the people he created. The song appeared as part of the Catholic Gotteslob.

== Background and history ==
Guido Maria Dreves was a Jesuit who researched the history of Latin hymns and published bibliographies of them in several volumes. He also wrote the text of hymns, including "Ein Danklied sei dem Herrn" in seven stanzas in 1886.

Josef Venantius von Wöss was an Austrian composer, teacher and lector based in Vienna who supported the Cecilian Movement. He composed the melody and a four-part setting. Five of the stanzas were included in the common Catholic German hymnal Gotteslob as GL 382. The hymn is also part of other songbooks.

== Theme and text ==
The text was originally in seven stanzas of seven lines each, rhyming ABABCDD. The song expresses thanks to God. In the first stanza, the focus is on his unlimited ("ganz ohne Maß") goodwill ("Huld") and merciful patience ("allbarmherzige Geduld"). In the second stanza, the singer talks to his soul, requesting to praise God day and night, as in some psalms, such as Psalm 103. The third stanza deals with God as the Creator. The fourth stanza reasons that all sorrows can be dismissed knowing that God knows a person's name, written in his hand. The final line repeats to trust in God's protection, being sure that he has good intentions for every person ("und sei gewiss, er meint es gut.)

== Melody and music ==
The melody is in C major and common time. It uses the range of an octave, and reminds of an anthem in a festive mood. Text and music of the last three lines of each stanza are repeated.

== Usage ==
The hymn is used when thanks to God are expressed, such as in a service giving thanks to Pope Benedict XVI at the Würzburg Cathedral on 28 February 2013, the day that his resignation took effect.
