= Komm, Heilger Geist, der Leben schafft =

Christian hymn in German

- Christian hymn
- English: Come, Holy Spirit, creating life
- Written: 1972
- Text: by Friedrich Dörr
- Language: German
- Based on: Veni Creator Spiritus
- Melody: 1524
- Published: 1975

"Komm, Heilger Geist, der Leben schafft" (Come, Creator Spirit, visit us) is a Christian hymn in German for Pentecost. The text is a paraphrase of the Latin hymn Veni Creator Spiritus by Friedrich Dörr, with a 1524 melody. It was first published in the Catholic German hymnal Gotteslob in 1975.

== History ==
Komm, Heilger Geist, der Leben schafft is one of many paraphrases of the 9th-century Veni Creator Spiritus which is attributed to Rabanus Maurus. The first version in German was Martin Luther's "Komm, Gott, Schöpfer, Heiliger Geist, published with a melody adapted from the Latin hymn's plainchant in Wittenberg in 1524. Dörr's version translates the six stanzas of the model, and adds a doxology. It was included with the 1524 melody in the first edition of the common German Catholic hymnal Catholic hymnal Gotteslob in 1975 as GL 241, and is, shortened by the last stanza, GL 342 in its 2013 edition, in the section Pentecost / Holy Spirit.
