= Johann Georg Ahle =

German composer (1651–1706)

Johann Georg Ahle (June 1651 – 2 December 1706) was a German composer, organist, theorist, and Protestant church musician.

== Biography ==
Ahle was born at Mühlhausen. His father was Johann Rudolph Ahle, who supplied him with early musical training. At the age of 23 he succeeded his late father at the post of organist at St. Blaise's in Mühlhausen; J.S. Bach would later hold this post. In 1671 his first book of arias was published, Neues Zehn Geistlicher Arien; all copies of this work are now lost, though a fragment survives. He, like his father, also became a city councilman in Mühlhausen. In 1680 he was named poet laureate by Emperor Leopold I.

Ahle's most well-known theoretical treatise was Johan Georg Ahlens musikalisches Gespräche (1695–1701), published in four volumes. His works, many of which are lost, included sacred and secular choral works, as well as novels which incorporated songs or musical interludes.

== Bibliography ==
Johann Georg Ahle, Schriften zur Musik [Music theoretical writings], edited by Markus Rathey, 2nd edition, Hildesheim: Olms, 2008

Markus Rathey, Johann Rudolph Ahle. 1625-1673. Lebensweg und Schaffen, Eisenach: Wagner, 1999

== Bibliography ==
- Don Randel, The Harvard Biographical Dictionary of Music. Harvard, 1996, p. 8.
