= Liebster Jesu, wir sind hier =

Lutheran hymn

- Lutheran hymn
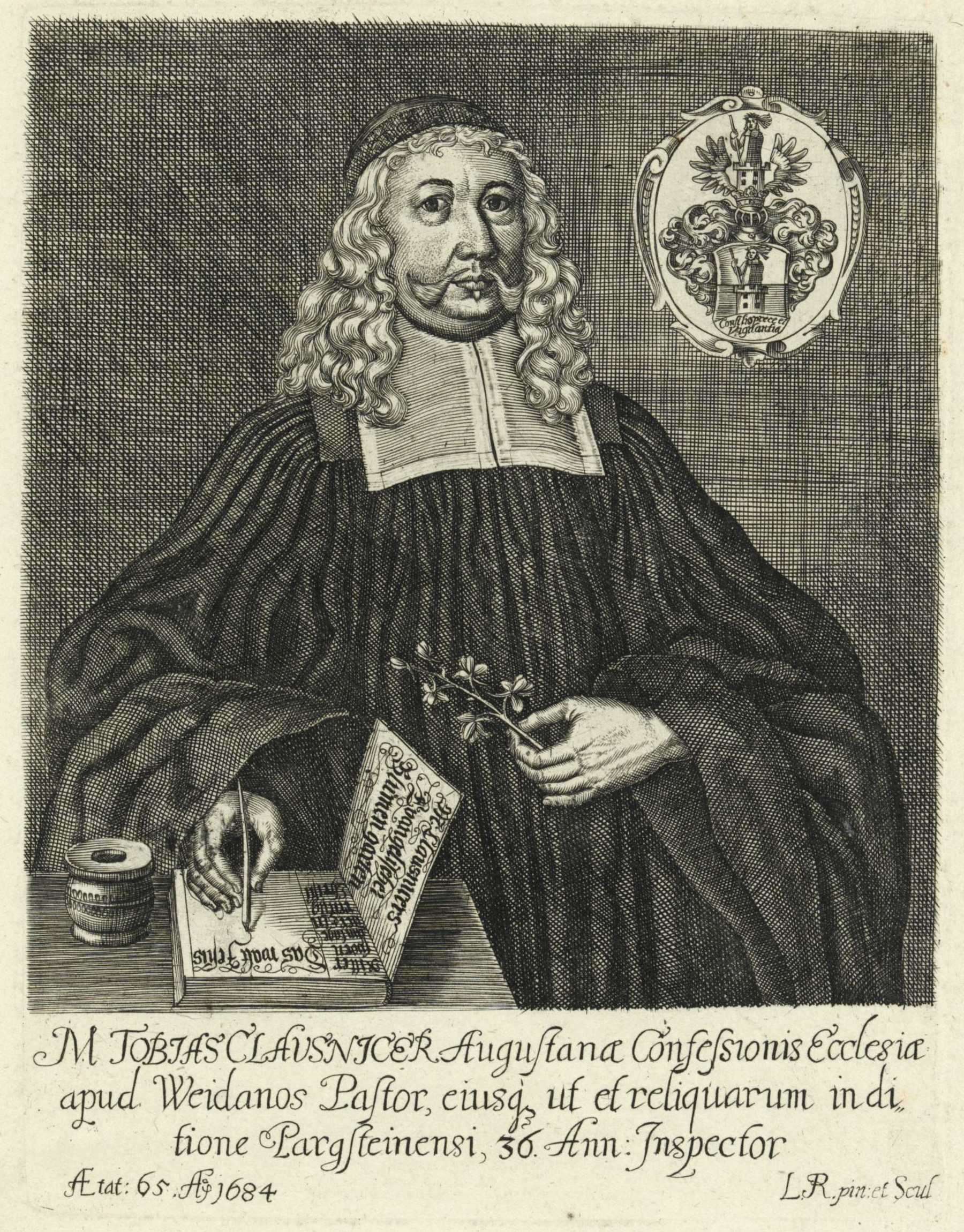
- Tobias Clausnitzer
- English: "Blessed Jesus, at your word"
- Catalogue: Zahn 3498b
- Written: 1663
- Text: by Tobias Clausnitzer
- Language: German
- Meter: 7 8 7 8 8 8
- Melody: by Johann Rudolph Ahle
- Composed: 1664
- Published: 1975

"Liebster Jesu, wir sind hier" (literally: Dearest Jesus, we are here) is a Lutheran hymn with text written by Tobias Clausnitzer in 1663, and a hymn tune, Zahn No. 3498b, based on a 1664 melody by Johann Rudolph Ahle (Zahn No. 3498a). A prayer for illumination, it is suitable for the opening of a church service and to be sung before a sermon. The song is part of the Protestant hymnal Evangelisches Gesangbuch as EG 161. It is also part of the Catholic hymnal Gotteslob as GL 149. It is popular also in English translations such as "Blessed Jesus, at your word" by Catherine Winkworth.

== History ==
Clausnitzer wrote the text "Liebster Jesu, wir sind hier" in 1663, as a prayer for illumination. It was often sung before a sermon in a church service, and also at the beginning of school lessons.

The hymn is part of the German Protestant hymnal Evangelisches Gesangbuch, as EG 161. It is part of the German Catholic hymnal Gotteslob of 2013, as GL 149 in the section Eröffnung (Opening), and of many other hymnals and songbooks. The song is published in more than 100 hymnals. Catherine Winkworth translated it as "Blessed Jesus, at your word". Other hymns sung to the same tune are "Blessed Jesus, here we stand" and "Word of God, Come Down on Earth".

== Text, melody and settings ==
"Liebster Jesu, wir sind hier" is in three stanzas of six lines each. The bar form has a Stollen of two lines, and an Abgesang of two lines, with a rhyming scheme ABABCC. The text is given as in GL 149, and in Winkworth's translation:

Liebster Jesu, wir sind hier,
dich und dein Wort anzuhören;
lenke Sinnen und Begier
hin zu deinem Himmelslehren,
daß die Herzen von der Erden
ganz zu dir gezogen werden.

Unser Wissen und Verstand
ist mit Finsternis umhüllet,
wo nicht deines Geistes Hand
uns mit hellem Licht erfüllet.
Gutes denken, tun und dichten
musst du selbst in uns verrichten.

O du Glanz der Herrlichkeit,
Licht vom Licht, aus Gott geboren,
mach uns allesamt bereit,
öffne Herzen, Mund und Ohren;
unser Bitten, Flehn und Singen
laß, Herr Jesu, wohl gelingen.

Translation:

Blessed Jesus, at your word
we are gathered all to hear you.
Let our hearts and souls be stirred
now to seek and love and fear you.
By your gospel pure and holy,
teach us, Lord, to love you solely.

All our knowledge, sense, and sight
lie in deepest darkness shrouded,
till your Spirit breaks our night
with your beams of truth unclouded.
You alone to God can win us;
you must work all good within us.

Glorious Lord, yourself impart;
Light of Light, from God proceeding,
open lips and ears and heart;
help us by your Spirit's leading.
Hear the cry your church now raises;
Lord, accept our prayers and praises.

=== Musical settings ===
The hymn appears in the vocal and organ works of Johann Sebastian Bach. He harmonised the slightly simplified tune as a four part chorale (BWV 373, transcribed below) and wrote two chorale preludes of the same tune for organ (BWV 730, and BWV 731) The chorale prelude BWV 633 to the same hymn and its embellished variant BWV 634 form part of the Orgelbüchlein.

Sigfrid Karg-Elert composed a chorale prelude as one of his 66 Chorale improvisations for organ, Op. 65, published in 1909.

=== Melody ===
The version of the melody used in recent German hymnals is slightly different from the one employed in Bach's settings.
