= Christian Knorr von Rosenroth =

17th-century German translator

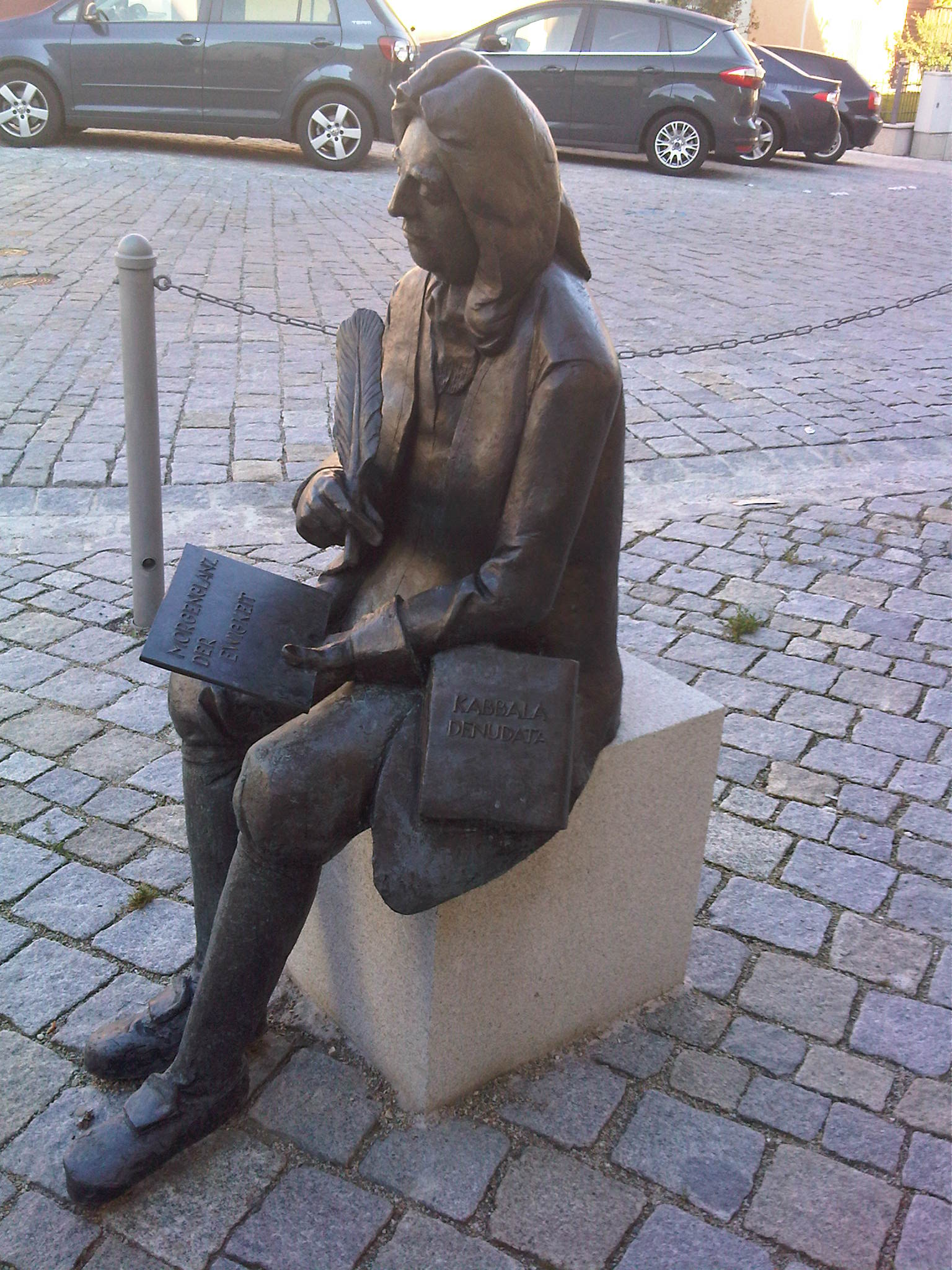
Sculpture of Christian Knorr von Rosenroth in Sulzbach-Rosenberg, by Peter Kuschel

Christian Knorr von Rosenroth (15/16 July 1636 – 4 May 1689) was a German Christian Hebraist and Christian Cabalist born at Alt-Raudten (today Stara Rudna) in Silesia. After having completed his studies in the universities of Wittenberg and Leipzig, he traveled through the Netherlands, France, and England. At Amsterdam, he became acquainted with an Armenian prince, with the chief Rabbi, Meier Stern, Dr. John Lightfoot and Henry More. Influenced by them, and others, he studied Oriental languages, chemistry, and the cabalistic sciences. On his return, he settled at Sulzbach where he became the privy counsellor of Christian Augustus, Count Palatine of Sulzbach. He devoted himself to the study of Hebrew. Later he became a student of the Kabbalah, in which he believed to find proofs of the doctrines of Christianity.

At the request of Franciscus Mercurius van Helmont he helped translate, edit and publish in Latin Jan van Helmont's writings on chemistry. He also dedicated time to translate Thomas Browne's vast-ranging work of scientific journalism, Pseudodoxia Epidemica, totalling over 200,000 words into German, completing this task in 1680 for publication in Frankfurt and Leipzig.

He also composed a number of hymns, including "Jesus, Sun of Righteousness", "Morgenglanz der Ewigkeit" ("Dayspring of Eternity", or "Come, Thou Bright and Morning Star").

A longer biography is available in Scholem (1974).

== Kabbalah ==
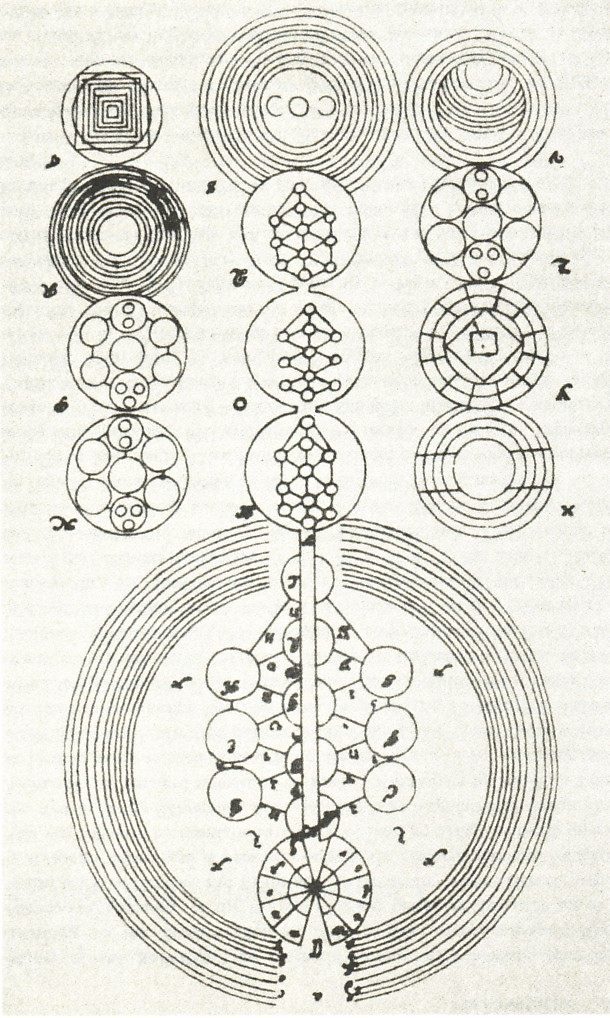
Sefirotic diagram from Christian von Rosenroth's Kabbala Denudata.

In Knorr Rosenroth's view, the Adam Kadmon of the cabalists is Jesus, and the three highest sefirot represent the Trinity. He intended to make a Latin translation of the Zohar and the Tiḳḳunim, and he published as preliminary studies the first two volumes of his Kabbala Denudata, sive Doctrina Hebræorum Transcendentalis et Metaphysica Atque Theologia (Sulzbach, 1677–78). They contain a cabalistic nomenclature, the Idra Rabbah and Idra Zuṭa and the Sifra di-Ẓeni'uta, cabalistic essays of Naphtali Herz ben Jacob Elhanan, etc. Rosenroth published two other volumes under the title Kabbala Denudata (Frankfort-on-the-Main, 1684), containing the Sha'ar ha-Shamayim of Abraham Cohen de Herrera and several of the writings of Isaac Luria. He was created Baron von Rosenroth by the Emperor Leopold I.

A partial English translation of the Kabbala Denudata was made by S. L. MacGregor Mathers in 1887 which is still in print by several publishers under the title The Kabbalah Unveiled.

== See also ==
- Christian Cabala
