= Johann Rudolph Ahle =

German composer (1625–1673)

- Born: 24 December 1625; Mühlhausen, Thuringia
- Died: 9 July 1673 (aged 47); Mühlhausen, Thuringia
- Education: University of Erfurt
- Occupations: Protestant church musician; Organist; Composer; Music theorist
- Organization: Divi Blasii

Johann Rudolph (or Rudolf) Ahle (24 December 1625 – 9 July 1673) was a German composer, organist, theorist, and Protestant church musician.

== Biography ==
Ahle was born in Mühlhausen, Thuringia. While not much is known of his early musical training, he attended the grammar school in Göttingen and then studied theology at the University of Erfurt from 1645 to 1649. In 1646 he became cantor at the Andreaskirche in Erfurt. In 1648 he published the Compendium per tenellis, a theoretical treatise on choral singing which was reprinted several times during his lifetime and for a last time 50 years later by his son Johann Georg (the last edition appeared in 1704).

In 1654 Ahle assumed the post of organist at the Divi Blasii in Mühlhausen. The next year he married Anna Maria Wölfer; their son, Johann Georg Ahle (1651–1706), was also a well-known composer and organist. Ahle was elected a town councillor in Mühlhausen in the 1650s, and was elected mayor shortly before his death in 1673. His immediate successor at the church was his son Johann Georg, and then briefly Johann Sebastian Bach, who worked in Mühlhausen in 1707/08.

Much of Ahle's compositional output consists of sacred choral and vocal works, instrumental music, and organ music. He is best known for motets and sacred concertos (most of them in German, some in Latin) contained in the collection Neu-gepflanzten Thüringischen Lust-Garten, in welchem ... Neue Geistliche Musicalische Gewaechse mit 3, 4, 5, 6, 7, 8, 10 und mehr Stimmen auf unterschiedliche Arten mit und ohne Instrument ... versetzet (1657–65). He is also known for hymn melodies, of which three remain in the common German Protestant hymnal Evangelisches Gesangbuch, including "Liebster Jesu, wir sind hier" and "Morgenglanz der Ewigkeit". The melody of the latter was used by Friedrich Dörr for the Advent song "Kündet allen in der Not".

== Performance ==
A performance of works edited by Jacob Gramit for a master's thesis from Ahle's New-gepflanzten Thüringischen Lust-Garten occurred in Toronto in May 2025 by the Toronto Chamber Choir. Artistic director Lucas Harris said likely most of the works had never been performed since the 17th century.
