= Friedrich Dörr =

German Catholic priest

- Friedrich Dörr, c. 1958
- Born: 7 March 1908; Obereschenbach, German Empire
- Died: 13 May 1993 (aged 85); Eichstätt, Germany
- Education: Collegium Germanicum; Pontifical Gregorian University
- Occupations: Theologian; Hymnwriter; Academic teacher
- Organization: Philosophisch-Theologische Hochschule in Eichstätt
- Awards: Order of Philip the Magnanimous

Friedrich Dörr (7 March 1908 – 13 May 1993) was a German Catholic priest and professor of theology, who is known as a hymnwriter. He shaped the first common German Catholic hymnal, Gotteslob, published in 1975.

== Life ==
Friedrich Dörr was born in Obereschenbach to a family of bakers, the son of Georg Dörr, who was mayor of his hometown until 1933. Friedrich was a member of the Collegium Willibaldinum of the humanist Gymnasium Eichstätt from age 11. After his Abitur in 1927, he studied philosophy and Catholic theology at the Collegium Germanicum in Rome, graduating in 1930 from the Pontifical Gregorian University. He was ordained as priest by Cardinal Francesco Marchetti Selvaggiani on 29 October 1933. He wrote his dissertation in 1935, entitled Diadochus von Photike und die Messaliner.

Dörr returned to the Diocese of Eichstätt in 1935, and worked as a parish priest in Erkertshofen, Fünfstetten, Wemding, Dietfurt, and at St. Walburg und Eichstätt and the Eichstätt Cathedral. In April 1940 he was drafted into the Wehrmacht to serve as a Sanitätssoldat, then from 1942 as Kriegspfarrer. He worked in this function in southern France, Leningrad, the Caucasus, and in Croatia. In March 1944, he was responsible for Denmark and West Prussia. After World War II ended, Dörr was appointed professor of Systematische Philosophie und Pädagogik at the Philosophisch-Theologische Hochschule in Eichstätt (later called Catholic University of Eichstätt-Ingolstadt) from 1 November 1945. He served as Rector of the institution from 1964 to 1968, and was professor until 1976. He was also president of the Studentenhilfe in Eichstätt.

From 1966 to 1975, Dörr was a member of the commission working towards the first common Catholic hymnal in German, Gotteslob. He wrote several hymns. The Book of Hours of 1978 contained 30 of his hymns.

He died in Eichstätt.

== Songs in Gotteslob ==
For the Gotteslob of 1975, Dörr contributed several songs, especially translations of Latin hymns, including "Komm, Heilger Geist, der Leben schafft" from Veni Creator Spiritus, "Sakrament der Liebe Gottes" from Tantum ergo, "O lieber Jesu, denk ich dein" from of Jesu dulcis memoria, "Du Licht des Himmels, großer Gott" from Deus qui coeli lumen es and the evening hymns "Christus, du bist der helle Tag" from "Christe, qui lux es et dies" and "Bevor des Tages Licht vergeht" from Te lucis ante terminum. He created a new hymn, retaining only the first line of "Maria, dich lieben ist allzeit mein Sinn".

The following list has the numbers of the 2013 Gotteslob, and the numbers in the first edition in brackets:

- "Bevor des Tages Licht vergeht" (Te lucis ante terminum), GL 663 (before 696)
- "Christus, du bist der helle Tag" ("Christe, qui lux es et dies"), GL 90 (before 704)
- "Du Licht des Himmels, großer Gott" (Deus qui coeli lumen es), GL 615
- "Ein Haus voll Glorie schauet", pseudonym: Hans W. Marx, GL 478 (before 639)
- "Gott ruft sein Volk zusammen", GL 477 (before 640)
- "Ich bin getauft und Gott geweiht", GL 491 (before 635)
- "Komm, Heilger Geist, der Leben schafft" (Veni Creator Spiritus), GL 342 (before 241)
- "Kündet allen in der Not", GL 221 (before 106)
- "Maria, dich lieben ist allzeit mein Sinn", GL 521 (before 594)
- "O Gott, dein Wille schuf die Welt" (Deus creator omnium), GL 628
- "O lieber Jesu, denk ich dein" (Jesu dulcis memoria), GL 368 (before 550)
- "Sakrament der Liebe Gottes" (Tantum ergo), GL 495 (before 542)
- "Was uns die Erde Gutes spendet", GL 186 (before 490)
- "Wir sind getauft auf Christi Tod", third and fourth stanza of "Das ist der Tag, den Gott gemacht", GL 329, (before 220)
