= Guido Maria Dreves =

German Jesuit, hymnologist and poet

- Born: 27 October 1854; Hamburg
- Died: 1 June 1909 (aged 54); Mitwitz
- Education: Stella Matutina; Jesuitenkolleg Münster; Jesuit College of Ditton-Hall
- Occupations: Hymnologist; Hymnwriter
- Organizations: Society of Jesus
- Parent: Lebrecht Blücher Dreves

Guido Maria Dreves (27 October 1854 – 1 June 1909) was a German Jesuit, hymnologist and hymnwriter. He was the son of the notary and poet Lebrecht Blücher Dreves.

== Life ==
Dreves was born in Hamburg. He already had contact with Jesuits at school, as he attended the Stella Matutina grammar school in Feldkirch from 1861. After completing his education, he immediately entered the Jesuit order in November 1869. He completed his novitiate in Sigmaringen and then studied at the Jesuitenkolleg Münster, at the religious house in Bleijenbeek Castle in the Netherlands and at the Jesuit College of Ditton-Hall in Shropshire, England. He devoted his research mainly to medieval Latin hymnody.

He is especially important as the author and editor of the Analecta hymnica medii aevi, the largest collection of medieval Latin poetry to date (hymns, sequences, tropes, rhyming offices and psalters). With astonishing diligence, Dreves searched libraries all over Europe for old manuscripts and incunables. From 1886 to 1926, 55 volumes of Analecta were published, from volume 25 onwards Clemens Blume co-editor.

Dreves died in Mitwitz bei Kronach (Oberfranken) at the age of 54.

== Works ==
- Stimmen durch den Lenz (poems). 1881
- O Christ hie merk! Ein Gesangbüchlein geistlicher Lieder. (sacred songs) 1885
- Analecta hymnica medii aevi. 55 volumes. 1886–1926 (Reprint: Minerva, Frankfurt 1961; digital: Rauner, Augsburg 2004–2005, via Nationallizenz
- Aurelius Ambrosius, der Vater des Kirchengesanges. Eine hymnologische Studie. 1893 (Neudruck Grüner, Amsterdam 1968)
- Schwert-Lilien. Sagen und Gesch. des Hohen Deutschen Ordens. 1898
- Ein Jahrtausend lateinischer Hymnendichtung. 1909 (2 volumes, published posthumously by Christian Blume)

The Gotteslob hymnal contains his songs:

- "Gelobt seist du, Herr Jesu Christ" (375)
- "Ein Danklied sei dem Herrn" (382)
- "Sagt an, wer ist doch diese" (531)
