= Gotteslob (1975) =

Common German-language Catholic hymnal

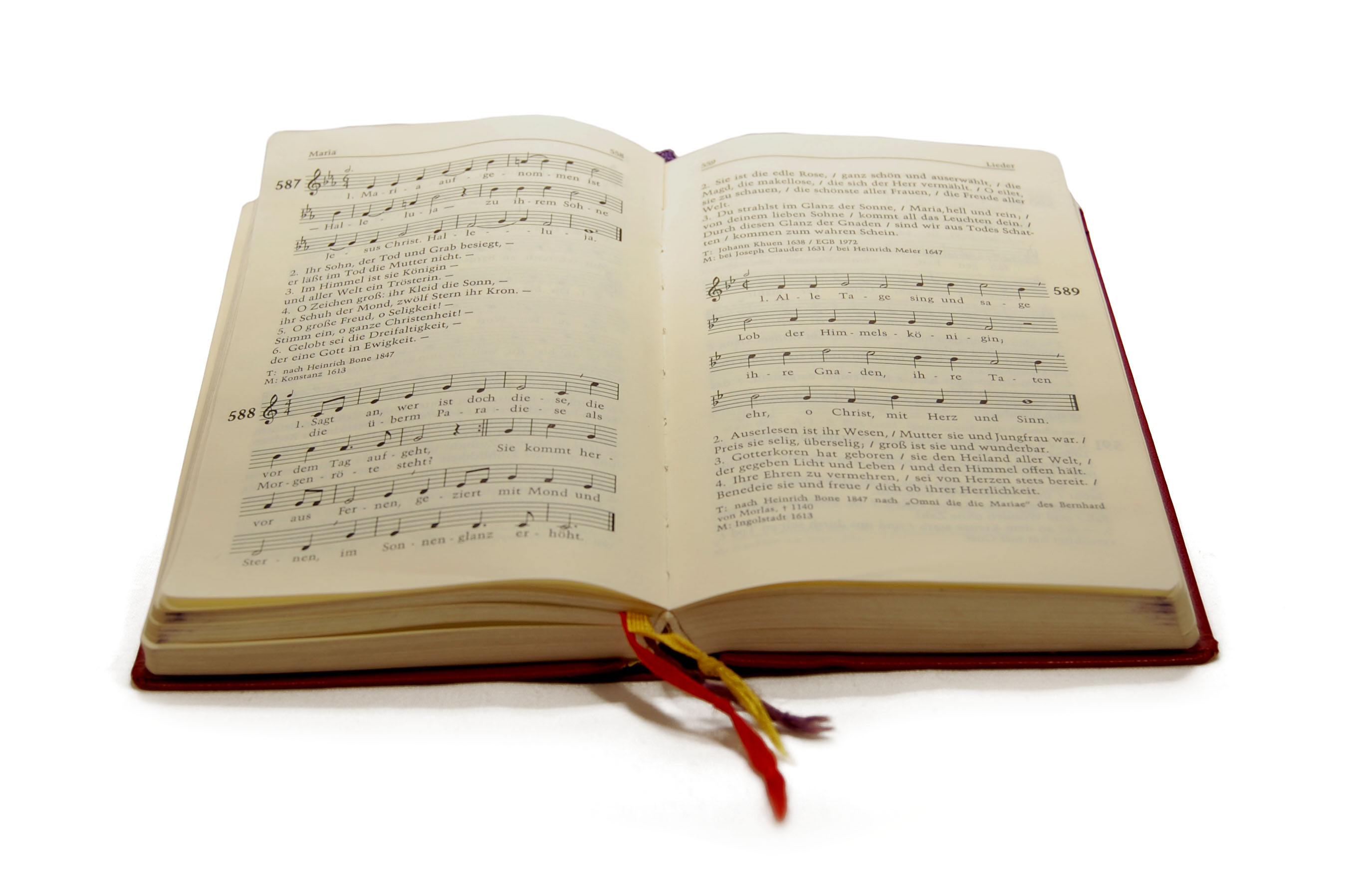
Opened book

The 1975 edition of Gotteslob (God's Praise) was the first combined prayerbook and hymnbook authorised by the bishops of all German-speaking Roman Catholics in Germany and Austria. It contains texts and songs for liturgy, communal prayer and private prayer, divided into a section which is common for all, and an appendix for the local songs in a diocese.

Forerunners for a common hymnal were the hymnal Cantate!, published by Heinrich Bone in 1847 and used by multiple diocese of German-speaking countries, and Kirchenlied, a 1938 hymnal that included songs by Protestant hymnwriters.

Maria Luise Thurmair was a member of the commission preparing the edition, and also contributed several songs to the book. Her "Den Herren will ich loben", based on the Magnificat and many other liturgical hymns appeared there first. Friedrich Dörr was a member of the commission who contributed mostly his translations of Latin hymns, such as "Komm, Heilger Geist, der Leben schafft", for Veni Creator Spiritus. He wrote the Advent song "Kündet allen in der Not" based on Isaiah 35.

From the First Sunday of Advent in 2013 until July 2014 it was gradually phased out and replaced by the present Gotteslob.

== See also ==
- Category:German-language Catholic hymns

== Bibliography ==
- Hermann Kurzke: Das Einheitsgesangbuch Gotteslob (1975–2008) und seine Vorgeschichte. In: Dominik Fugger/Andreas Scheidgen (Hgg.): Geschichte des katholischen Gesangbuchs, Tübingen 2008, S. 51–64; ISBN 978-3-7720-8265-8.
- Hermann Kurzke, Andrea Neuhaus (ed.): Gotteslob-Revision. Probleme, Prozesse und Perspektiven einer Gesangbuchreform, Tübingen 2003. ISBN 3-7720-2919-1
- Kunibertas Dobrovolskis (ed.), Gitarrenspiel zum Gotteslob, Freiburg, (12) 2003, ISBN 978-3-451-17911-2 (Stammteil des Gotteslobs mit Gitarren-Akkorden)
