= List of hymns for Pentecost =

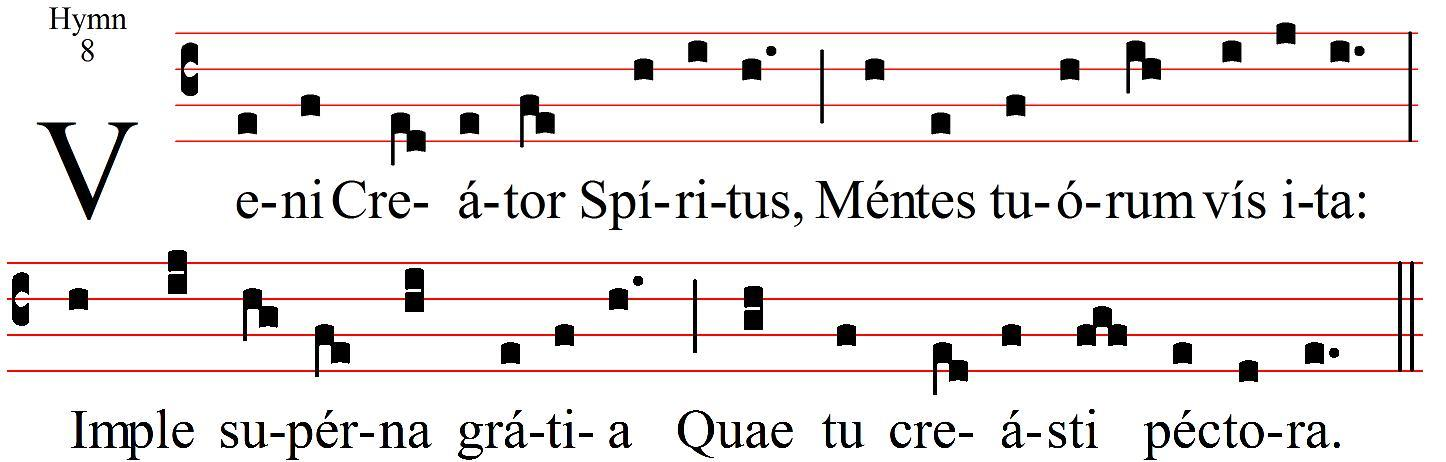
First verse of Veni Creator Spiritus, on which many later hymns are based

Hymns for Pentecost are hymns dedicated to the Christian feast of Pentecost, or Whitsun. Along with Christmas and Easter, it is a high holiday, dedicated to the Holy Spirit, or Holy Ghost. Hymns have been written from the 9th century to contemporary.

== History ==
First hymns were sung in Latin, and in plainchant. An early hymn was Veni Creator Spiritus (Come, Creator Spirit), attributed to Rabanus Maurus who lived in the 9th century. It was used in the liturgy not only for Pentecost, but also for vespers between Ascension Day and Pentecost, and for occasions such as ordination and profession. Many later hymns in different languages are based on it. An early sequence for Pentecost was Veni Sancte Spiritus (Come, Holy Spirit).

With the Reformation, hymns were often written in the native language. Martin Luther wrote several hymns dedicated to Pentecost specifically, based on earlier models. His first published hymn was "Komm, Gott Schöpfer, Heiliger Geist", a paraphrase of Veni Creator Spiritus, which appeared in the Erfurt Enchiridion in 1524.

Hymns in English include "Come, Holy Ghost, our souls inspire", a paraphrase of Veni Creator Spiritus by Bishop John Cosin, published in the 1662 Book of Common Prayer and used also for coronations of English royals, and "Breathe on Me, Breath of God", written by Edwin Hatch in 1876.

== Table ==
In the following sortable table, the entries appear first chronologically based on writing or publishing of the text. The following columns feature the language, a translation of the beginning, the author of the text, a year of writing when known or assumed, the source of the melody, its year, a publication date followed by a hymnal name, and notes. The notes may contain a reference, a number in a current hymnal, such as the 2013 German Catholic hymnal Gotteslob or its previous edition of 1975 (GL), and the German Protestant hymnal Evangelisches Gesangbuch (EG), also notes about a model.

Hymns for Pentecost
Hymn	Language	Translation	Text	Written	Tune	Composed	Published	Notes
Veni Creator Spiritus	Latin	Come, Creator Spirit	Rabanus Maurus (attr.)	809 c.	plainchant from Kempten	1000 c.		GL 341
Veni Sancte Spiritus	Latin	Come, Holy Spirit	Stephen Langton (attr.)	1200 c.	plainchant	1200 c.	1570, Roman Missal	GL 343
Discendi amor santo	Italian	Come Down, O Love Divine	Bianco da Siena	1390 c.	"Down Ampney"	1906	1867, The People's Hymnal	Best known after The English Hymnal (1906)
Komm, Gott Schöpfer, Heiliger Geist	German	Come, God Creator, Holy Spirit	Martin Luther	1524	based on chant	1524	1524, Erfurt Enchiridion	EG 126, translation of Veni Creator Spiritus
Komm, Heiliger Geist, Herre Gott	German	Come, Holy Spirit, Lord God	Martin Luther	1524	Martin Luther and Johann Walter	1524	1524, Erfurt Enchiridion	EG 125, after "Veni Sancte Spiritus, reple tuorum corda fidelium*
Nun bitten wir den Heiligen Geist	German	Now we implore the Holy Spirit	Martin Luther	1524	based on chant	1524	1524, Gesangbüchlein	EG 124, 1st stanza medieval
Come holy ghost eternall god	English		Thomas Cranmer	1550			1550, Prayer Book Ordinal	after "Veni Creator Spiritus"
Come, Holy Ghost, our souls inspire	English		John Cosin	1625			1662, Book of Common Prayer	after Veni Creator Spiritus
Komm, Schöpfer Geist, kehr bei uns ein	German	Come, Creator Spirit, visit us	Heinrich Bone	1845	from Cologne	1741	1975, Gotteslob	GL 351, translation of Veni Creator Spiritus
Breathe on Me, Breath of God	English		Edwin Hatch	1876	"Aylesbury" and others	1781	1886	
Der Geist des Herrn erfüllt das All	German	The Spirit of the Lord fills the universe	Maria Luise Thurmair	1941	Melchior Vulpius	1609	1975, Gotteslob	GL 347
Tui amoris ignem (Veni Sancte Spiritus)	Latin	Fire of your love	liturgical	1970s	Jacques Berthier	1970s	1970s, Taizé Community	GL 345
Komm, Heilger Geist, der Leben schafft	German	Come, Holy Spirit, creating life	Friedrich Dörr	1972	after plainchant	1524	1975, Gotteslob	GL 342, translation of Veni Creator Spiritus
Atme in uns, Heiliger Geist	German	Breathe in us, Holy Spirit	Jean-Marc Morin	1985	Pierre and Viviane Mugnier	1982	2013, Gotteslob	GL 346, based on "Esprit de Dieu, souffle de vie"
