= O clap your hands (disambiguation) =

O clap your hands are the first words of Psalm 47 (King James version).

O clap your hands may also refer to:

- O clap your hands (Vaughan Williams), a 1920 motet by Ralph Vaughan Williams setting verses from Psalm 47
- O clap your hands (Rutter), a 1973 anthem for choir and organ by John Rutter setting verses from Psalm 47
