= Lobpreiset all zu dieser Zeit =

- Christian hymn
- English: Praise all at this time
- Occasion: New Year
- Written: 1851
- Text: by Heinrich Bone
- Language: German
- Melody: by Martin Luther
- Composed: 1529

"Lobpreiset all zu dieser Zeit" (Praise all at this time) is a Christian hymn in German for a new year with text by Heinrich Bone written in 1851. It is contained in the Catholic hymnal Gotteslob. It is sung to a melody that Martin Luther created in 1529.

== History ==
"Lobpreiset all zu dieser Zeit" was written by Bone in 1851, to an older melody. There was a tendency in the Catholicism of the 19th century to fill the secular date of a new year with Christian interpretation. Bone published five stanzas with a refrain in the 1851 edition of his hymnal Cantate!, in a section Das Fest der Beschneidung. Neujahr. (The feast of the Circumcision. New year.), which was distinguished then from the preceding Zum Schlusse des Jahres (For the conclusion of the year).

The first two stanzas of the hymn, with a different third stanza dating to 1969, were included in the first edition of the common German Catholic hymnal Gotteslob in 1975, as GL 158, This version was retained in the second edition as GL 258, in the section Jahresschluss / Neujahr (End of a year / New Year). The refrain was also slightly changed, with a focus on God as the giver of time and caring for his creation. The melody is attributed to Martin Luther, who created it in 1529 for "Nun freut euch, lieben Christen g'mein", The melody is also used for "Es ist gewißlich an der Zeit" in 1529, which Johann Sebastian Bach set for four parts as BWV 307. The same melody is also one of the tunes of the Christmas carol "Ich steh an deiner Krippen hier" which Bach set for four parts in his Christmas Oratorio. Editor Richard Mailänder included a chorale prelude in the first volume of a 2013 collection of preludes for songs from the new Gotteslob, dedicated to Advent, Christmas and turn of the year, Choralvorspiele für Advent und Weihnachten. Walter Hofmann composed a chorale prelude, included in his collection Vorpiele zu Liedern aus dem neuen Gotteslob.

The song is contained in other hymnals and songbooks. It is frequently sung in services connected to the turn of a year.
