= Max Drischner =

German composer, Kantor, organist and harpsichordist

Max Drischner (31 January 1891 – 25 April 1971) was a German composer, Kantor, organist, and harpsichordist.

== Life and work ==
Max Drischner was born in Prieborn (now Przeworno), Silesia. After completing his A-levels at the grammar school in Züllichau, he started theological studies in 1910 at Leipzig and Breslau. However, after seven semesters, he gave this up to study the organ, piano, and harpsichord at the Berlin Music Academy. A teacher in his principal subject, Wanda Landowska, had a major influence on him.

Between 1916 and the end of the First World War, he was a voluntary medical orderly in France. During this time, he lost the top of a finger on his left hand.

After the war, through self-teaching, he acquired an extensive knowledge of music before the Bach period. He gave his first harpsichord concerts in Breslau in 1920 and in Brieg in 1923. In Brieg, he was trained by Paul Hielscher in organ playing and choir leading. In 1923, he founded a youth choir that was later united with the choir from St. Nikolai in Brieg. In 1924, he was appointed as cantor and organist of St. Nikolai in Brieg.

During his tenure in Brieg, he composed the majority of his organ and vocal works. He also led his choir to acclaimed success. He also took part in choir and church music conventions. In the interests of the organ movement, he had the famous Michael-Engler-Organ restored between 1926 and 1928. From 1927, he traveled at least six times to Norway, in order to study Norwegian folk melodies which would form the basis for many of his compositions. In 1942, in recognition of his ministry in Brieg, he was appointed Kirchenmusikdirektor.

Drischner married Käthe Petran in 1928. In 1929, their daughter Katharina was born. The marriage ended in divorce after in 1938 10 years.

In January 1945, as Brieg was declared a military fortress, Drischner had to flee to Prieborn. In Prieborn, he undertook the ministry of organist in the Lutheran church and also in the Catholic church in nearby Siebenhufen. In the autumn of 1946, Max Drischner, his mother, and his sister Margarethe were expelled from Silesia. From then on, the three Drischners lived together until the death of the mother in 1957, aged almost 90. Margarethe remained as an indispensable companion to her brother, outliving him by three months.

After short stops in resettlement quarters at Magdeburg and Eimersleben, Max Drischner was for two months the cantor and organist at the St. Augustine's Monastery in Erfurt.

The three Drischners lived in Herrenberg (Württemberg) from 1947 until 1955. In Herrenberg, Drischner was the organist and cantor in the Stiftskirche, but this lasted only a few months: In May 1948, after a five-month stay in the University Hospital of Tübingen, it was confirmed that due to illness, he would be unable to continue in his appointment.

In 1955, the three Drischners moved to Goslar, the partner town of Brieg. In 1956, the City of Goslar honored Max Drischner with the award of the City Culture Prize. In the nearby church of the Grauhof Monastery, he took over organ demonstrations, organ concerts, and organ ceremonies at the Brieger gatherings ("Brieger Treffen"). It was here as well that he made numerous audio recordings - for a gramophone record and for audiotape letters to friends and relatives.

In 1961, he had special pleasure in being able to renew his contact with his respected teacher Wanda Landowska.

Albert Schweitzer played a highly meaningful role in Max Drischner's life. As early as when he had been a schoolboy he had read Schweitzer's book about Johann Sebastian Bach and already written to him in 1910. Schweitzer had answered promptly and thus had begun a lifelong correspondence. They met each other four times: in 1929 in Frankfurt, Karlsruhe and Königsfeld; in 1932 in Kehl and Strassburg; in 1951 in Herrenberg and in 1954 in Günsbach. Albert Schweitzer never went to Brieg. Drischner gave an account of their meetings in "The friendship between the jungle doctor and a Silesian cantor".

The three Drischners found their final resting place at the cemetery in Lautenthal in the Harz mountains.

Fritz Feldmann wrote in the 1973 edition of MGG (Musik in Geschichte und Gegenwart) about Drischner's compositions: "Drischner's reproductive activity was born by the youth movement, unpretentious, serving only the church community and never emphasizing the virtuoso. Parallel to that are his compositions, which, according to his own opinion, are captured improvisations that, in the line of the ritual, want to be intelligible to each church member. They want to avoid modern paths without becoming a slave to the epigonic copy of the style of a specific standard. They are distinguished by an ever tonal melodic that is even with recitative texts, songlike and beholden especially to the Silesian and also the Nordic folklore."

Remembrances of and documents from Max Drischner are owned and preserved by Matthias Müller, who inherited the composer's entire estate just before the death of Drischner's son-in-law, Dr.Paul Kast.

== Works (selected) ==
The selection begins with the compositions of "Edition Schultheiss", which is the series of works of Max Drischner issued from 1947 onwards by the Publishing Company Schultheiss in Tübingen. The texts of the title pages are usually in several parts: the individual titles (e.g. Hymn of the sun or Worship the Lord) followed by the composition genre (in particular: Passacaglia or Choralfantasy), and to these have been added usually comprehensive directions for the performance. These three parts are always completely reproduced here. Added in circular and squared brackets, respectively, are also the dates of the transcript and the print.

- Die Weihnachtsgeschichte nach Lukas 2 - Brieger Christnacht 1944 mit Liedern aus der Grafschaft Glatz Für Chor / ein- oder vierstimmig / Einzelstimme und Orgel / statt Orgel Harmonium, Klavier oder Cembalo. (1944)
- Die Ostergeschichte nach den Evangelien Für Chor / ein- oder vierstimmig / Einzelstimme und Orgel / statt Orgel Harmonium, Klavier oder Cembalo (1945)
- Brieger Singe- und Spielbuch 40 Lieder für das ganze Kirchenjahr aus "Ein Neues Lied" "Der helle Ton" für eine Singstimme / Geige und Orgel oder einstimmigen Chor / Geigenchor und Orgel. Statt Geige auch andere Melodieinstrumente / etwa Flöte / Oboe / Trompete / Blockflöte. Statt Orgel: Harmonium / Klavier oder Cembalo [1935]
- Brieger Singe- und Spielbuch zweiter Teil, Volkslieder für offenes Singen, Schul- und Hausmusik für eine Singstimme, Geige und Klavier oder einstimmigen Chor, Geigenchor u. Klavier (Cembalo, Kleinorgel oder Harmonium) Statt Geige auch andere Melodieinstrumente, etwa Flöte, Oboe, Trompete, Blockflöte. Statt Klavier auch drei Geigen u. Cello (Laute, Guitarre) [1935]
- Der Herr ist mein Hirte (Psalm 23) für Sopran, Alt, 1 Männerstimme ad.lib. und Orgel (Harmonium) oder Klavier (1943)
- Herr Gott, du bist unsere Zuflucht (Psalm 90) für 2 Singstimmen (2-stimmigen Chor) und Orgel (Harmonium) oder Klavier und Orgel (1943)
- Tübinger Psalmen für eine Singstimme, Geige und Orgel (oder Chor, Melodieinstrument und Tasteninstrument) (1948): Aus der Tiefe ruf' ich, Herr, zu dir (Psalm 130) - Herr, du erforschest mich und kennest mich (Psalm 139) - Ich liege und schlafe ganz mit Frieden (Psalm 4, Vers 7,9 und Psalm 74, Vers 16)
- Motets: Sheet music with: Es sollen wohl Berge weichen (1924) - Selig sind die Toten (1944) - Wir warten des Heilands (1949)
- Vier Chorgesänge für vierstimmigen Chor; Sheet music [1959] with: Halleluja (1923) - Hör die Kirchenglocken rufen - Gib Frieden, Herr, gib Frieden - So wünsch ich euch ein gute Nacht
- Zwei Weihnachtslieder aus der Grafschaft Glatz für vier gemischte Stimmen und Das Glatzer Dreikönigslied für drei gleiche Stimmen; Sheet music (1950-1951) with: Von seinem ew'gen festen Thron - Gelobt sei Gott, gelobt sein Sohn - Drei Könige aus Morgenland kamen gezogen
- Lieder zur Jahreswende nach Texten von Arno Pötzsch für vierstimmigen Chor; Sheet music with: Nun schlägt die Stunde (1950) - Das Jahr geht hin (1951) - Der Eine kommt, der Andre geht (1951) - Du Gott, du bist das Leben (1951)
- Choralvorspiele für Dorforganisten für Orgel (Harmonium) oder Klavier (Deutsch / Norwegisch) (1954) (dedicated to Eivind Berggrav)
- Choralvorspiele für Orgel (mit Pedal) (1954) (dedicated to Helene Schweitzer)
- Praeludium und Fuge in a-moll für Orgel (1923) (dedicated to Albert Schweitzer)
- Lobe den Herren Choralfantasie für Klavier (Cembalo) oder Orgel (Harmonium) (1918)
- Vom Himmel hoch, da komm ich her Choralfantasie für Orgel (1917 und 1923)
- Wachet auf, ruft uns die Stimme Choralfantasie für Orgel (1923)
- Wie schön leuchtet der Morgenstern Choralfantasie für Orgel (1929)
- Nordische Kanzonen für Orgel oder für Klavier zu vier Händen 2 volumes (1940) (dedicated to Margarete Drischner)
- Nordische Toccata und Fuge g-moll (1936) (dedicated to Ingolv Nilssen)
- Nordische Fantasie a-moll für Orgel (1956) (dedicated to Arild Sandvold )
- Norwegische Variationen Sechs Reihen Variationen über alte norwegische Volkstöne für Klavier (Cembalo, Klavichord) oder Orgel (mit 2 Manualen und Pedal oder Kleinorgel ohne Pedal) oder Streichquartett (Streichorchester, mit anderen Instrumenten nach Belieben) (1939)
- Norwegische Volkstonsuiten 40 alte norwegische Volkstöne in Form von sechs Suiten für Klavier oder Orgel oder Streichquartett Für Klavier (Cembalo, Klavichord) oder Orgel (mit oder ohne Pedal) oder Streichquartett (Streichorchester, mit anderen Instrumenten nach Belieben) (1939) (dedicated to Eivind Berggrav)
- Passacaglia c-moll für Orgel (1923) (dedicated to Helmut Thörner)
- Sonnen-Hymnus Passacaglia in E-Dur für Orgel oder für Klavier zu vier Händen (1924)
- Chaconne f-moll für Orgel oder Klavier (1948) (dedicated to “my compatriots which were exiled from their homeland Silesia”)
- Zwei Choralpartiten über Jesu meine Freude und Befiehl du deine Wege für Orgel mit oder ohne Pedal, Kleinorgel, Klavier, Cembalo oder Klavichord (1945) (dedicated to Wanda Landowska)
- Glatzer Variationen für Klavier (Cembalo) oder Orgel (Harmonium), Variationen über Lieder aus der Grafschaft Glatz: Schönster Herr Jesu (1934) - O laufet ihr Hirten (1942) - Gelobt sei Gott, gelobt sein Sohn (1942)
- Variationen über das Marienlied "Wunderschön prächtige" für Orgel mit oder ohne Pedal, Kleinorgel, Klavier, Cembalo oder Klavichord (1949) (dedicated to the Franciscans in Grauhof)
- Partiten über zwei Weihnachtslieder Es ist ein Ros' entsprungen und In dulci jubilo für Orgel, Harmonium oder Klavier (1950)
- Published by Max Drischner: Antonio de Cabezón: 4 Tientos für Orgel, mit oder ohne Pedal, Kleinorgel, Harmonium oder Klavier, Cembalo, Klavichord oder Streichquartett (Streichorchester, auch mit anderen Instrumenten) oder Instrumente aller Art, auch Zupfinstrumente (1953) (dedicated to Albert Schweitzer)

This collection was taken over in 1995 by the Music Publishers Thomi-Berg in München-Planegg. It is still called Edition Schultheiss. However, the second volume of the Brieger Singe- und Spielbuch was removed from the collection.

In addition, both before and after the Second World War, other publishers have released Drischner's compositions. For example:

- Spielmannslieder, Lute accompaniment of Texts by Paul Steinmüller [Greiner & Pfeiffer, Stuttgart 1923]
- Variations on Deutschland, Deutschland über alles für Orgel [Littmann, Breslau 1933]
- Toccata A-major (1916), in the collection "Sunday by Sunday" by [Hinrichsen, London 1965]
- Parts of the Brieger Singe- und Spielbuch I, in the collection of "Make a joyful noise" von [Concordia Publishing House Saint Louis, Missouri, USA]
- Praeludium D-minor (1916), in a collection of [Fentone Music Ltd. Corby Northants 1993]

Only manuscripts or copies of manuscripts have been preserved of other works of Max Drischner.

Hanne-Lore Reetz claims possession of the manuscripts. But no one has ever seen them in their hands. Dr. Paul Kast, Drischer's son-in-law and Bach specialist, handed over Drischner's estate, including all manuscripts, to cantor Matthias Müller shortly before his death, as documented by documentary evidence. He owns manuscripts like:

- Lobe den Herrn, meine Seele (Psalm 104) for soloists, choir and organ (1946)
- Die Schöpfungsgeschichte (1948)
- Messe a cappella (started in 1950)
- Der Herr ist mein Hirte (Psalm 23) for an a cappella women's choir in four parts
- Was betrübst du dich, meine Seele (Psalm 43) for a two to four-part choir with organ (1946)
- Ist Gott für uns for a two to four-part choir with organ.
- Selig sind die Toten for two equal parts and organ (1944)
- Die 7 Worte am Kreuz for a two-part choir: soprano/tenor and alto/bass
- Auf diesen Tag bedenken wir (1947) and Komm, heiliger Geist, Herre Gott (1947), two chorales for one singing voice and a figured accompanying voice
- Chorale preludes for the organ (without pedal): Mir ist Erbarmung widerfahren (1945) - Nun lasst uns Gott, dem Herren (1945) - O komm, du Geist der Wahrheit (1946) - Christ lag in Todesbanden (1947) - Herr Jesu Christ, dich zu uns wend (1947) - Such, wer da will, ein ander Ziel (1947) - Herr Gott, dich loben alle wir (1947) - Allein zu dir, Herr Jesu Christ (1947) - O little town of Bethlehem (1955)
- Trio B-minor for the organ
- Fugues for the organ: C-minor (1918), D-minor (1923)
- Preludes with fugues for the organ: G-minor (1931), A-major (1933), A-minor (Norwegian) (1935)
- Prelude (Toccata), Fugue and Chaconne G-major for the organ (1943)
- Schönster Herr Jesu Variations for the organ (1919)
- Wie soll ich dich empfangen Chorale with eight variations for the organ (1943)
- Wilhelmus von Nassauen (1934)
- Deutschland, heiliges Wort Organ hymn (1940)
- Largo for the lute (1924)
- Variations for the lute on O Haupt voll Blut und Wunden (1931)
- Two series, each with four variations for 3 violins on Norwegian Christmas carols O store konge, Davids sönn (1933) and Hvor er det godt å lande (1933)
- Violin choir in D-major monophonic with organ or piano
- Memento mori Norwegian Chorale for 3 violins (1937)
- Es ist ein Ros entsprungen Chorale and two variations for 3 violins (1948)

Friedrich Kudell and Peter Zerbaum cite further manuscripts in their directory:

- Lass dich nicht ängstigen (Text of the Holy Theresa of Avila) for a two to four-part choir with organ (1946)
- Wer will uns scheiden von der Liebe Gottes for choir and organ

Matthias Müller is the owner of all manuscripts, documents, photos, and more. He received this estate, documented, from Drischner's son-in-law, Paul Kast. Unfortunately, Drischner's clavichord was stolen by a relative shortly before the estate was handed over. Likewise, letters from Albert Schweitzer to Drischner, to own manuscripts of:

- Heilig Vaterland Organ hymn (1940 ?) and
- Die Kunst der Fuge von JS Bach, adapted by Max Drischner for the Engler-organ, four-handed (about 1935)

He had already previously claimed on www.max-drischner.de that he knew "many more not published works" and he restated this claim in the last sentence of an article about Max Drischner that appeared in MGG in 2001. In 2002, he also reported in "Organ International" about Hesford's discovery in the organ of Niederschwedeldorf and repeated this in the "Almanac 2013 on Culture and History of the County of Glatz”. Unfortunately, he refuses to reveal any further information because of the bad behavior of members of Drischners' family.

== Literature ==
- Bryan Hesford: The Life and Work of Max Drischner, 2 volumes, England 1974
- Friedrich Kudell: Max Drischner, Leben und Wirken dargestellt nach zeitgenössischen Dokumenten und Erinnerungen, Vlotho 1987
- Matthias Müller: Wie eine gute Predigt - Der Brieger Kantor Max Drischner, in: Orgel International, 2002, Seite 294f
- MGG: Matthias Müller: Max Drischner
- Bogdan Andrzej Tabisz: Działalność Organmistrzowska Rodziny Englerów, Lublin 2014, Thesis treating the organ maker family Engler and their works. There is a German Translation in the family archives of those parts of the text that cover the Brieger organ and Drischner.
