= Cantate! =

German Catholic hymnal

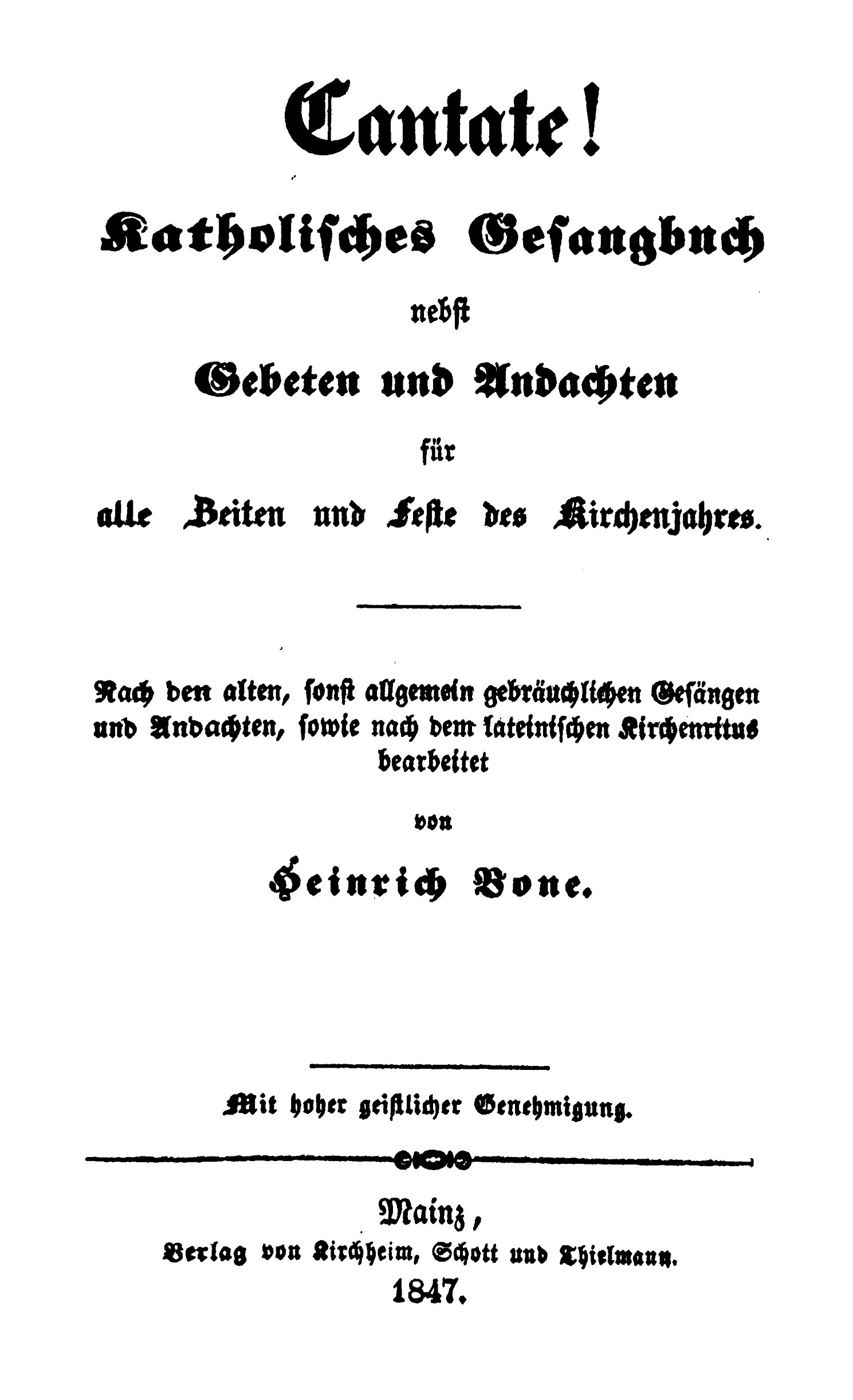
- Title page of the first edition
- Editor: Heinrich Bone
- Language: German
- Genre: Hymnal
- Published: 1847
- Publisher: F. Schöningh
- Publication place: Paderborn

Cantate! (Sing!) is a German Catholic hymnal first published in 1847, and continued in seven editions until 1879. It was a collection of 444 old and new songs, edited by the educator and hymnwriter Heinrich Bone, and the first Catholic hymnal in German that was used in multiple dioceses. Several of the songs are still part of the common Catholic hymnal in the Germanosphere, Gotteslob.

== History ==
Heinrich Bone published the hymnal Cantate! (Sing!), a collection of 444 songs, which appeared between 1847 and 1879 in seven editions. It was the first Catholic hymnal which was used in multiple German-speaking dioceses. A book with melodies for the songs appeared in 1852.

== Program ==
The hymnal has a programmatic title in Latin, referring to the traditional liturgical language of the Roman Rite in the Catholic Church. It is subtitled "Katholisches Gesangbuch nebst Gebeten und Andachten für alle Zeiten und Feste des Kirchenjahres" (Catholic songbook including prayers and contemplations for all times and feasts of the church year). Bone published traditional Latin hymns as the basis for singing in church, and also translated medieval and Baroque hymns into contemporary Standard German, such as "Komm, Schöpfer Geist, kehr bei uns ein" as a paraphrase of the 9th-century Veni Creator Spiritus, to make the return of traditional choral hymns to Catholic services more feasible. It also contained new hymns.

For the second, expanded edition of 1851, Bone wrote a foreword of several pages explaining his program, dated Christmas 1850. It is followed by an alphabetic index of the songs, first the songs in German, then those in Latin. A list of prayers and contemplations is followed by a list of the feasts, naming a saint for each day of the year. The songs begin with Latin hymns, listed with parallel German versions. The section with songs in German follows the liturgical year, beginning with Advent. Hymns often refer to original Latin hymns.

== Gotteslob ==
The common German hymnal Gotteslob of 1975 contained several songs from Bone's Cantate!, some with revised wording. Some were included in its second edition of 2013, and some also in the Protestant hymnal EG. In the following list, the GL number refers to the 2013 edition, with the former number in brackets.

- GL 222 (112) "Herr, send herab uns deinen Sohn" for Advent, after Veni, veni, Emmanuel
- GL 258 (158) "Lobpreiset all zu dieser Zeit" for New Year's Day, also EG 550 (West), first two stanzas
- GL 329 (220) "Das ist der Tag, den Gott gemacht" for Easter, stanzas 1,2,5
- GL 351 (245) "Komm, Schöpfer Geist, kehr bei uns ein" for Pentecost, after Veni Creator Spiritus
- GL 142 (462) "Zu dir, o Gott, erheben wir", for the beginning of a service
- GL 532 (584) "Christi Mutter stand mit Schmerzen", a paraphrase of the Stabat Mater
- GL 522 (587) "Maria aufgenommen ist" for Assumption of Mary
- GL 526 (589) "Alle Tage sing und sage", a paraphrase of "Omni die dic Mariae"

Hymns in regional sections of the Gotteslob include:

- "Das Zeichen ist geschehen" (Advent, John the Baptist)
- "Lass erschallen die Posaune" (Advent)
- "Zion, auf, werde licht" (Epiphany)
- "Zu dir in schwerem Leid" (Lent)
- "Am Ölberg in nächtlicher Stille" (Passion of Jesus)
- "Halleluja lasst uns singen" (Easter)
- "O heiligste Dreieinigkeit" (after Friedrich Spee, Trinity Sunday)
- "Nun lasst uns aus der Seele Grund"
- "Vater unser, der du wohnest" (paraphrase of Lord's Prayer)
- "Nun lobet Gott und singet" (Corpus Christi)
- "Christen, seht der Engel Speise" (paraphrase of Lauda Sion)
- "Die Jungfrau auserkoren" (birth of Mary)
- "Johannes, auserkoren" (St. John's Day)
- "Zu der Apostel Preis und Ruhm"
- "Herr, segne ihn, den du erwählt" (consecreation of a priest)
- "Herr, gib Frieden dieser Seele" (Requiem)
- "Dir, Vater, tönt der Lobgesang" (Eucharist).

== Bibliography ==
- Bone, Heinrich, ed. (1851). Cantate! (in German) (2nd ed.). Paderborn: F. Schöningh.
- Bone, Heinrich, ed. (1879). Cantate! (in German) (7th ed.). Paderborn: F. Schöningh.
