= Breathe on Me, Breath of God =

English Christian hymn written by Edwin Hatch

- Hymn for Pentecost
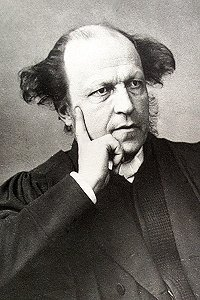
- The poet
- Written: 1878
- Text: by Edwin Hatch
- Based on: John 20:21-22
- Meter: 6.6.8.6 (Short Metre)
- Melody: "Trentham" by Robert Jackson; "Aylesbury" by John Chetham and S.S. Wesley; "Carlisle" by Charles Lockhart; "Veni Spiritus" by Sir John Stainer
- Published: 1886

"Breathe on Me, Breath of God" is an English Christian hymn. It was written by Edwin Hatch, a Church of England vicar and the Professor of Classics at the University of Trinity College in Canada. It was first published privately in 1878 and publicly published in 1886.

== History ==
Edwin Hatch spent his childhood in a non-conformist background before being ordained into the Church of England. In 1876 he wrote "Breathe on Me, Breath of God" and published it privately in a pamphlet entitled "Between Doubt and Prayer". giving it the Latin title of "Spiritus Dei" (Spirit of God). The hymn was later published into the public sphere in 1886 in Henry Allon's "The Congregational Psalmist Hymnal". It was republished posthumously by Hatch's widow in 1890 in "Towards Fields of Light: Sacred Poems".

The handbook to the Psalter Hymnal, where "Breath on Me, Breath of God" was later published, referred to the oft quoted statement about Hatch's faith being "as simple and unaffected as a child" being an appropriate description of the hymn. it was also described by the United Methodist Church as: "The simplicity of this profound hymn belies the education and knowledge of its author". Hatch's simple words refer to the accounts of the creation of man by God in Genesis and of the spiritual breath of God which came to humanity via Jesus at Pentecost.

== Music ==
"Breathe on Me, Breath of God" has been set to a number of tunes. The most commonly used ones are John Chetham and S.S. Wesley's 1718 "Aylesbury", the Irish tune "St. Columba", and blind London organist Charles Lockhart's "Carlisle". Other tunes include "Veni Spiritus" by Sir John Stainer and "Trentham" by Robert Jackson. The use of "Trentham" was criticised by hymnologist Donald Webster in 1980 who stated "One might conclude from [this tune] and the way it is sung that the breath of God was an anaesthetic, not a 'Giver of Life'."
