= Das ist der Tag, den Gott gemacht =

- Christian hymn
- Occasion: Easter
- Text: by Heinrich Bone
- Language: German
- Published: 1845

"Das ist der Tag, den Gott gemacht" (This is the day that God made) is a German Christian hymn for Easter. In the Catholic hymnal Gotteslob it appears as Gl 329.

== History ==
The text was written by Heinrich Bone (1813–1893), a pedagogue who is known for his hymnal Cantate! of 1847. When his song was included in the Gotteslob of 1975, Friedrich Dörr (1908–1993) added two stanzas from 1972 to the original three stanzas.

The melody is attributed to Johannes Leisentritt (1527–1586) who is known for his 1567 hymnal Geistliche Lieder und Psalmen der Alten Apostolischer recht und warglaubiger Christlicher Kirchen, one of the hymnals of the Counter-Reformation.

Musical settings of the hymn include an organ version by Herbert Voß (1922–2006), a four-part setting by Volker Wangenheim (1928–2014), a four-pat setting with organ by Klaus Fischbach (born 1935), and both a four-part setting (2012) and an organ setting (2016) by Ludger Stühlmeyer.

== Literature ==
- Ludger Stühlmeyer: Christus gestern, heute und in Ewigkeit. Das Lied: Das ist der Tag den Gott gemacht. In: Heinrichsblatt, Osterspezial, No. 15, Bamberg 8 April 2012, p VI.
