= Wunderschön prächtige =

- Marian hymn
- English: Most beautiful and glorious
- Written: 19th century
- Text: Unknown author, revised by Johannes von Geissel and Heinrich Bone
- Language: German
- Based on: elegy from Mirantische Mayen-Pfeiff, 1692
- Meter: 6 6 10 / 6 6 10 / 5 5 9 10
- Composed: anonymous

"Wunderschön prächtige" is a German hymn to Mary which 19th-century theologians Johannes von Geissel and Heinrich Bone adapted independently from older models and folk tradition going back to the 18th century. The song addresses Mary by many descriptive adjectives and in prose. It is, in different versions of both text and melody, part of regional sections of the Catholic hymnal in German, Gotteslob, and of songbooks.

== History ==
The origin of Wunderschön prächtige is assumed in Austria in the first half of the 18th century, based on an elegy attributed to Laurentius von Schnüffis, published in Mirantische Mayen-Pfeiff in 1692. His proper name was Johann Martin; he applied the term Mirantisch ('Mirantian') – an anagram of his last name – to almost all his publications; thus Mirantische Mayen-Pfeiff mean's Martin's May Music, a May devotion to the Blessed Virgin Mary. His song is introduced by the line "Clorus wegen grosser Lieb verlangt höchlich daß allerholde seeligste angesicht der Mutter Gottes zu sehen" (Clorus desires highly, out of great love, to see the fairest blessed face of the Mother of God.), followed by a line in Latin and German quoted from the Song of Songs 2:14: "Ostende mihi faciem tuam. / Zeige mir dein Angesicht."

The beginning of the melody appears in Marc-Antoine Charpentier's Canticum in nativitatem Domini, H. 393, composed around 1676. The song became a spiritual Volkslied, widely distributed in leaflets and hymnals. The melody was also used in 1759 for a song of thanks for the victory of the Austrians against the Prussians in the Battle of Kunersdorf. It was published in 1808 by Achim von Arnim and Clemens Brentano in their collection Des Knaben Wunderhorn, entitled "Maria, Gnadenmutter zu Freyberg" (Mary, Mother of Mercy in Freyberg)).

The song became a hymn in two independent paraphrases, one by Johannes von Geissel in the 1842 Speyerer Gesangbuch, the other by Heinrich Bone in Cantate! in 1847.

In several versions of both text and melody, the hymn is contained in regional sections of the 2013 Catholic hymnal in German, Gotteslob. It is also part of songbooks. The hymn is still popular in the 21st century.

== Poem and melodies ==
Bone's text is:

1. Wunderschön Prächtige,
Große und Mächtige,
Liebreich holdselige, himmlische Frau;
Welcher ich ewiglich
Kindlich verbinde mich,
Ja mich mit Leib und mit Seele vertrau!
Gut, Blut und Leben
Will ich ihr geben;
Alles, ja Alles, Gedanken und Sinn,
Geb‘ ich mit Freuden, Maria, dir hin!

2. Sonnenumglänzete,
Sternenbekränzete,
Leuchte und Trost auf der nächtlichen Fahrt;
Vor der verderblichen
Makel der Sterblichen
Hat dich die Allmacht des Vaters bewahrt
Selige Pforte
Warst du dem Worte,
Als es vom Throne der ewigen Macht
Gnade und Rettung den Menschen gebracht.

3. Gottesgebärerin,
Christi Ernährerin,
Wundersam Mutter und Jungfrau zugleich!
Herzenerquickende,
Seelenbeglückende
Quelle, an himmlischen Tröstungen reich!
O du Getreue,
Zu dir voll Reue
Schauen wir hoffend und flehend hinan,
Mutter, ach führ’ uns auf sicherer Bahn!

4. Du bist die Helferin,
Du bist die Retterin
Fürstin des Himmels und Mutter des Herrn!
Spiegel der Reinigkeit,
Stärke der Christenheit,
Arche des Bundes, hell leuchtender Stern!
Liebreich dich wende,
Frieden uns sende,
Mutter, ach wende die Augen uns zu,
Lehr‘ uns in Demuth zu wandeln wie du.

5. Einst auch Betrübete,
Vielfach Geübete,
Kennest der Seelen tief innersten Schmerz;
Niemand je untergeht,
Der zu dir kindlich fleht,
Keinen verachtet dein mütterlich Herz;
Tröst uns im Leiden,
Stärk uns im Scheiden,
Bitte für uns deinen göttlichen Sohn,
Wann er uns ruft vor den ewigen Thron.

Beautiful, glorious,
high and mighty,
loving and blest, heavenly woman,
to whom in all eternity
childlike I tie myself,
yes, entrust my body and soul.
Possessions, blood and life
I shall give to you;
everything, yes all, thoughts and mind,
I give joyfully to you, Mary.

Gleaming with sun rays,
crowned with stars,
light and comfort in dark journeys;
From the pernicious
blemish of mortals
did the almighty father save you.
Blessed portal
you were to the word
as it from the throne of eternal power
brought grace and salvation to humanity.

Bearer of God,
nurturer of Christ,
miraculously mother and virgin at once!
Refreshing our hearts,
you souls-delighting
source, rich in heavenly consolations!
O you true one,
to you full of remorse
we look up, hoping and pleading,
Mother, lead us to a safe path.

You are the helper,
you are the saviour
princess of Heaven and mother of the Lord!
Mirror of pureness,
strength of Christendom,
Ark of the Covenant, bright radiant star!
Turn lovingly,
peace send to us,
mother, turn your eyes to us,
teach us to walk humbly like you.

Once saddened,
often distressed,
you know the souls' innermost pain;
No one will perish
who childlike implores you,
your maternal heart despises no one;
comfort us in our suffering,
strength us in our parting,
plead for us to your divine son
when he calls us before the eternal throne.

The poem is in bar form, with a stollen of three lines, the first two short ones rhyming, and an abgesang of four lines, again the first two even shorter ones rhyming, and the last line similar to the last one of the stollen. The song addresses Mary by many descriptive and euphoric adjectives and in prose. The melodies have in common that they are in triple meter, mostly in steady quarter notes with a dotted quarter note to emphasise the middle of the short lines in the stollen. two eighth-notes in the short lines of the abgesang, and both elements appearing in the last lines of both.
