= Lili Wieruszowski =

German composer and organist

Lili Wieruszowski (10 December 1899 in Cologne – 2 March 1971) was a German composer and organist, who was born in Cologne, Germany, and lived in Basel, Switzerland, for many years. She was one of four daughters of Alfred Ludwig Wieruszowski and the women's rights activist Jenny Wieruszowski. Her parents helped start a girls' high school in Cologne, and her sister Helene became a well-known historian. Lili's parents converted from Judaism to Protestantism and raised their daughters as Protestants.

Wieruszowski studied music at the Cologne Conservatory, then at the Berlin University of Music. In 1925 she was employed as an organist at the Charlottenburg Epiphany Congregation. This job ended in 1933 when she was banned from playing the organ in Germany because of her Jewish background. She moved to Basel where she became well known as an organist and composer during the 1940s and 1950s. Her music was published by Schott, Foetisch, Krumpholtz, and Zwingli Verlag.

Wieruszowski's compositions include:

== Organ ==
- 22 Chorale Preludes and Intonations
- Chorale Preludes 1946 (with Rudolph Moser)
- 43 Chorale Preludes 1956
- 26 Chorale Preludes 1965

== Vocal ==
- Geneva Psalter
- Huguenot psalms
- Psalm 25
- Psalm 33
- Psalm 47
- Psalm 107
- psalm settings in the Swiss Evangelical Reformed Church Hymnal (some with instrumental accompaniment)
