= Der Geist des Herrn erfüllt das All =

- Hymn for Pentecost
- English: The Spirit of the Lord fills the universe
- Occasion: Pentecost
- Text: by Maria Luise Thurmair
- Language: German
- Melody: by Melchior Vulpius
- Published: 1946

"Der Geist des Herrn erfüllt das All" (The Spirit of the Lord fills the universe) is a Christian hymn for Pentecost by Maria Luise Thurmair, written in 1941. First printed in 1946, it appeared with a 1609 melody by Melchior Vulpius in the German Catholic hymnal Gotteslob in 1975 as GL 249. It has been included in ecumenical hymnals and songbooks.

== History ==
Maria Luise Thurmair wrote "Der Geist des Herrn erfüllt das All" in Innsbruck in 1941, the year of her marriage to the hymnwriter Georg Thurmair. It was then a hymn in seven stanzas about the influence of the Holy Spirit, written for the Innsbruck hymnal Gotteslob (or Innsbrucker Gesangbuch). It was published in 1946 by Christophorus, part of Herder in Freiburg. The song appeared in the Catholic hymnal Gotteslob in 1975 as GL 249, in four stanzas with a 1609 melody by Melchior Vulpius. In the current Gotteslob it is GL 347, in the section "Pfingsten – Heiliger Geist" (Pentecost – Holy Spirit). In the Protestant hymnal Evangelisches Gesangbuch of Württemberg it appears as EG-Wü 554. In the Protestant hymnal of Rheinland/Westfalen/Lippe it is EG 566. The song has been included in several songbooks, such as Alive, a ecumenical songbook for young people.

In the current Gotteslob, the hymn appears in four stanzas of seven lines. The four stanzas are in bar form, each Abgesang ending on Halleluja. The first stanza describes creation as being filled with God's spirit, filled with light and rejoicing. The second stanza notes that the Spirit awakes the spirit of visionaries and prophets. The third stanza reflects Jesus rescuing Earth ("die Erde zu erlösen"). The last stanza uses images of the spirit as storm throughout the world with a breath of fire, making God's Kingdom alive ("wird Gottes Reich lebendig").

The tune in 6/4 time is a lively dance. It was originally composed for a hymn "Lobt Gott, den Herrn, ihr Heiden all". Johann Paul Zehetbauer composed a setting for a four-part mixed choir, published by the Promultis-Verlag in Munich in 2003.

== Bibliography ==
- Negel-Täuber, Birgitta (26 September 2012). "24. Oktober: Maria-Luise Thurmair-Mumelter / Zum 100. Geburtstag der Kirchenlieddichterin Thurmair / Der liturgischen Bewegung verpflichtet" (in German). Domradio.
- Gallegos Sánchez, Katrin. "24. Oktober: Maria-Luise Thurmair-Mumelter". Konradsblatt (in German). Diocese of Freiburg.
- Grub, Udo (2012). Evangelische Spuren im katholischen Einheitsgesangbuch "Gotteslob" von 1975 (in German). LIT Verlag Münster. p. 252. ISBN 9783643116635. Archived from the original on 2017-04-10.
- "Der Geist des Herrn erfüllt das All; gemischter Chor" (in German). deutsche-digitale-bibliothek.de.
- "Der Geist des Herrn erfüllt das All". Lieder zum Glauben (in German). Evangelisches Gesangbuch. Archived from the original on 11 June 2017.
- "Der Geist des Herrn erfüllt das All" (in German). liederdatenbank.de.
- "Der Geist des Herrn erfüllt das All" (in German). evangeliums.net.
- "Der Geist des Herrn erfüllt das All (L) / Gesänge – Jahr – Pfingsten – Heiliger Geist" (in German). mein-gotteslob.de.
- "GL 249 – Der Geist des Herrn erfüllt das All" (PDF) (in German). dioezese-linzold.at.
- "Der Geist des Herrn erfüllt das All". Gotteslob (in German). Diocese of Limburg.
