= Psalm 25 =

Biblical psalm

- "Unto thee, O LORD, do I lift up my soul."
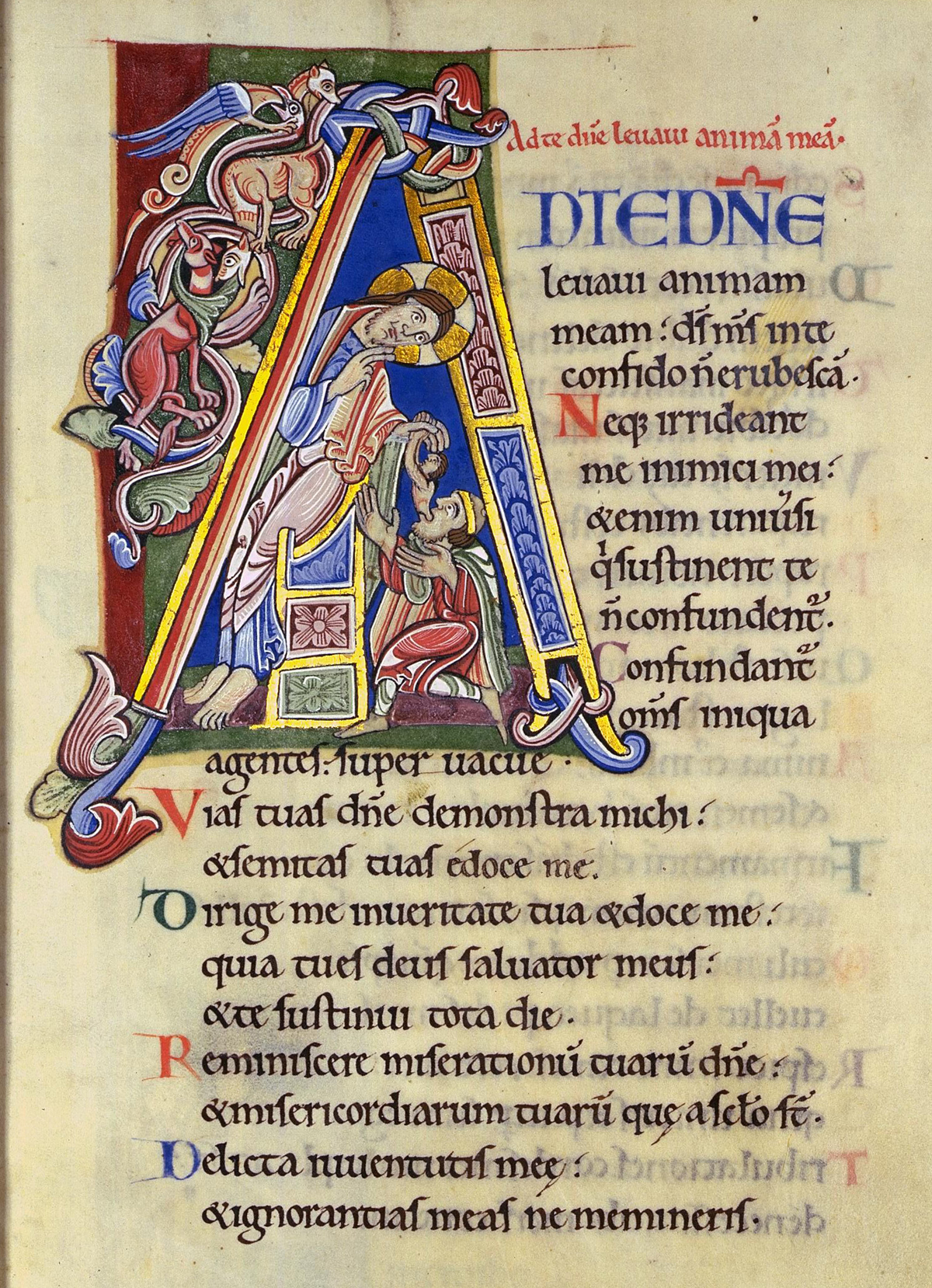
- Verses 1 to 7a of Psalm 25 (Psalmus 24) in the 12th-century St. Albans Psalter
- Other name: Psalm 24 (Vulgate); "Ad te Domine levavi animam meam"
- Language: Hebrew (original)

Psalm 25
- ← Psalm 24 Psalm 26 →
- Book: Book of Psalms
- Hebrew Bible part: Ketuvim
- Order in the Hebrew part: 1
- Category: Sifrei Emet
- Christian Bible part: Old Testament
- Order in the Christian part: 19

Psalm 25 is the 25th psalm of the Book of Psalms, beginning in English in the King James Version: "Unto thee, O LORD, do I lift up my soul". The Book of Psalms is part of the third section of the Hebrew Bible, and a book of the Christian Old Testament. In the slightly different numbering system used in the Greek Septuagint and Latin Vulgate translations of the Bible, this psalm is Psalm 24. In Latin, it is known as "Ad te Domine levavi animam meam". The psalm, attributed to David, has the form of an acrostic Hebrew poem.

The psalm forms a regular part of Jewish, Catholic, Lutheran, Anglican and Nonconformist Protestant liturgies. Metrical hymns in English and German were derived from the psalm, such as "Zu dir, o Gott, erheben wir". The psalm has often been set to music. Orlando Gibbons composed an anthem in English, O Lord, I lift my heart to thee. Heinrich Schütz composed a setting in German "Nach dir verlangt mich", as part of the Becker Psalter. Johann Sebastian Bach used verses from the psalm in his early cantata, Nach dir, Herr, verlanget mich, BWV 150.

== Place in the structure of the Psalms ==
Preceding Psalm 25, O. Palmer Robertson identifies a sequence of five Psalms that pertinently contribute to the establishment narrative of David's dynasty.

The immediate prior Psalms are 'The Cross, The Crook and The Crown Psalms:

- The Cross (Psalm 22): Psalm 22 is often regarded as a Messianic Psalm, prophetically describing the suffering and crucifixion of Jesus Christ. The vivid depiction of agony and the plea for God's presence align with the crucifixion narrative.

- The Crook (Psalm 23): Psalm 23, known as the Shepherd's Psalm, shifts to a pastoral metaphor. It portrays God as the caring shepherd, guiding and providing for His people. The crook, or shepherd's staff, symbolizes guidance, care, and protection.

- The Crown (Psalm 24): Psalm 24 emphasizes the kingship of God and His glory. It is often seen as a coronation Psalm, celebrating the triumphant entry of the King of Glory. The theme of sovereignty and kingship relates to the crown.

In the context of acrostic Psalms, scholars, exemplified by O. Palmer Robertson, perceive them as transitional components between distinct subjects. Additionally, these acrostic Psalms serve a dual purpose, functioning as mnemonic tools and pedagogical instruments for conveying instruction.

Psalm 25:8 affirms the inherent goodness and uprightness of the LORD, thereby elucidating His commitment to instructing those who transgress in the path of righteousness. Subsequent to Psalm 25, the thematic thread pertaining to instruction becomes discernible, marking a notable emergence of terms associated with teaching. Prior to this juncture in Psalm 25, the terms "teach" or "teaching" are conspicuously absent, a phenomenon extending through Psalm 34.

== Structure ==
The psalm is divided into three parts.

In the first portion of the psalm, David:

1. professes his desire towards God:
2. professes his dependence upon God
3. begs direction from God
4. professes God's infinite mercy.

In the middle portion, he addresses his own iniquities;

In the concluding portion, he pleads:

1. God's mercy:
2. his own misery, distress, affliction and pain.
3. the iniquity of his enemies, and deliverance from them.
4. He pleads his own integrity.

== Text ==
The following table shows the Hebrew text of the Psalm with vowels, alongside the Koine Greek text in the Septuagint and the English translation from the King James Version. Note that the meaning can slightly differ between these versions, as the Septuagint and the Masoretic Text come from different textual traditions. (Note: A 1917 translation directly from Hebrew to English by the Jewish Publication Society can be found here or here, and an 1844 translation directly from the Septuagint by L. C. L. Brenton can be found here. Both translations are in the public domain.) In the Septuagint, this psalm is numbered Psalm 24.

#	Hebrew	English	Greek
1	לְדָוִ֡ד אֵלֶ֥יךָ יְ֝הֹוָ֗ה נַפְשִׁ֥י אֶשָּֽׂא׃	(A Psalm of David.) Unto thee, O LORD, do I lift up my soul.	Ψαλμὸς τῷ Δαυΐδ. - ΠΡΟΣ σέ, Κύριε, ἦρα τὴν ψυχήν μου, ὁ Θεός μου.
2	אֱֽלֹהַ֗י בְּךָ֣ בָ֭טַחְתִּי אַל־אֵב֑וֹשָׁה אַל־יַעַלְצ֖וּ אוֹיְבַ֣י לִֽי׃	O my God, I trust in thee: let me not be ashamed, let not mine enemies triumph over me.	ἐπὶ σοὶ πέποιθα· μὴ καταισχυνθείην, μηδὲ καταγελασάτωσάν με οἱ ἐχθροί μου.
3	גַּ֣ם כׇּל־קֹ֭וֶיךָ לֹ֣א יֵבֹ֑שׁוּ יֵ֝בֹ֗שׁוּ הַבּוֹגְדִ֥ים רֵיקָֽם׃	Yea, let none that wait on thee be ashamed: let them be ashamed which transgress without cause.	καὶ γὰρ πάντες οἱ ὑπομένοντές σε οὐ μὴ καταισχυνθῶσιν· αἰσχυνθήτωσαν οἱ ἀνομοῦντες διακενῆς.
4	דְּרָכֶ֣יךָ יְ֭הֹוָה הוֹדִיעֵ֑נִי אֹ֖רְחוֹתֶ֣יךָ לַמְּדֵֽנִי׃	Shew me thy ways, O LORD; teach me thy paths.	τὰς ὁδούς σου, Κύριε, γνώρισόν μοι, καὶ τὰς τρίβους σου δίδαξόν με.
5	הַדְרִ֘יכֵ֤נִי בַאֲמִתֶּ֨ךָ ׀ וְֽלַמְּדֵ֗נִי כִּֽי־אַ֭תָּה אֱלֹהֵ֣י יִשְׁעִ֑י אוֹתְךָ֥ קִ֝וִּ֗יתִי כׇּל־הַיּֽוֹם׃	Lead me in thy truth, and teach me: for thou art the God of my salvation; on thee do I wait all the day.	ὁδήγησόν με ἐπὶ τὴν ἀλήθειάν σου καὶ δίδαξόν με, ὅτι σὺ εἶ ὁ Θεὸς ὁ σωτήρ μου, καὶ σὲ ὑπέμεινα ὅλην τὴν ἡμέραν.
6	זְכֹר־רַחֲמֶ֣יךָ יְ֭הֹוָה וַחֲסָדֶ֑יךָ כִּ֖י מֵעוֹלָ֣ם הֵֽמָּה׃	Remember, O LORD, thy tender mercies and thy lovingkindnesses; for they have been ever of old.	μνήσθητι τῶν οἰκτιρμῶν σου, Κύριε, καὶ τὰ ἐλέη σου, ὅτι ἀπὸ τοῦ αἰῶνός εἰσιν.
7	חַטֹּ֤אות נְעוּרַ֨י ׀ וּפְשָׁעַ֗י אַל־תִּ֫זְכֹּ֥ר כְּחַסְדְּךָ֥ זְכׇר־לִי־אַ֑תָּה לְמַ֖עַן טוּבְךָ֣ יְהֹוָֽה׃	Remember not the sins of my youth, nor my transgressions: according to thy mercy remember thou me for thy goodness' sake, O LORD.	ἁμαρτίας νεότητός μου καὶ ἀγνοίας μου μὴ μνησθῇς· κατὰ τὸ ἔλεός σου μνήσθητί μου, σύ, ἕνεκεν χρηστότητός σου, Κύριε.
8	טוֹב־וְיָשָׁ֥ר יְהֹוָ֑ה עַל־כֵּ֤ן יוֹרֶ֖ה חַטָּאִ֣ים בַּדָּֽרֶךְ׃	Good and upright is the LORD: therefore will he teach sinners in the way.	χρηστὸς καὶ εὐθὴς ὁ Κύριος· διὰ τοῦτο νομοθετήσει ἁμαρτάνοντας ἐν ὁδῷ.
9	יַדְרֵ֣ךְ עֲ֭נָוִים בַּמִּשְׁפָּ֑ט וִילַמֵּ֖ד עֲנָוִ֣ים דַּרְכּֽוֹ׃	The meek will he guide in judgment: and the meek will he teach his way.	ὁδηγήσει πραεῖς ἐν κρίσει, διδάξει πραεῖς ὁδοὺς αὐτοῦ.
10	כׇּל־אׇרְח֣וֹת יְ֭הֹוָה חֶ֣סֶד וֶאֱמֶ֑ת לְנֹצְרֵ֥י בְ֝רִית֗וֹ וְעֵדֹתָֽיו׃	All the paths of the LORD are mercy and truth unto such as keep his covenant and his testimonies.	πᾶσαι αἱ ὁδοὶ Κυρίου ἔλεος καὶ ἀλήθεια τοῖς ἐκζητοῦσι τὴν διαθήκην αὐτοῦ καὶ τὰ μαρτύρια αὐτοῦ.
11	לְמַֽעַן־שִׁמְךָ֥ יְהֹוָ֑ה וְֽסָלַחְתָּ֥ לַ֝עֲוֺנִ֗י כִּ֣י רַב־הֽוּא׃	For thy name's sake, O LORD, pardon mine iniquity; for it is great.	ἕνεκεν τοῦ ὀνόματός σου, Κύριε, καὶ ἱλάσῃ τῇ ἁμαρτίᾳ μου, πολλὴ γάρ ἐστι.
12	מִי־זֶ֣ה הָ֭אִישׁ יְרֵ֣א יְהֹוָ֑ה י֝וֹרֶ֗נּוּ בְּדֶ֣רֶךְ יִבְחָֽר׃	What man is he that feareth the LORD? him shall he teach in the way that he shall choose.	τίς ἐστιν ἄνθρωπος ὁ φοβούμενος τὸν Κύριον; νομοθετήσει αὐτῷ ἐν ὁδῷ, ᾗ ᾑρετίσατο.
13	נַ֭פְשׁוֹ בְּט֣וֹב תָּלִ֑ין וְ֝זַרְע֗וֹ יִ֣ירַשׁ אָֽרֶץ׃	His soul shall dwell at ease; and his seed shall inherit the earth.	ἡ ψυχὴ αὐτοῦ ἐν ἀγαθοῖς αὐλισθήσεται, καὶ τὸ σπέρμα αὐτοῦ κληρονομήσει γῆν.
14	ס֣וֹד יְ֭הֹוָה לִירֵאָ֑יו וּ֝בְרִית֗וֹ לְהוֹדִיעָֽם׃	The secret of the LORD is with them that fear him; and he will shew them his covenant.	κραταίωμα Κύριος τῶν φοβουμένων αὐτόν, καὶ ἡ διαθήκη αὐτοῦ δηλώσει αὐτοῖς.
15	עֵינַ֣י תָּ֭מִיד אֶל־יְהֹוָ֑ה כִּ֤י הֽוּא־יוֹצִ֖יא מֵרֶ֣שֶׁת רַגְלָֽי׃	Mine eyes are ever toward the LORD; for he shall pluck my feet out of the net.	οἱ ὀφθαλμοί μου διὰ παντὸς πρὸς τὸν Κύριον, ὅτι αὐτὸς ἐκσπάσει ἐκ παγίδος τοὺς πόδας μου.
16	פְּנֵה־אֵלַ֥י וְחׇנֵּ֑נִי כִּֽי־יָחִ֖יד וְעָנִ֣י אָֽנִי׃	Turn thee unto me, and have mercy upon me; for I am desolate and afflicted.	ἐπίβλεψον ἐπ᾿ ἐμὲ καὶ ἐλέησόν με, ὅτι μονογενὴς καὶ πτωχός εἰμι ἐγώ.
17	צָר֣וֹת לְבָבִ֣י הִרְחִ֑יבוּ מִ֝מְּצוּקוֹתַ֗י הוֹצִיאֵֽנִי׃	The troubles of my heart are enlarged: O bring thou me out of my distresses.	αἱ θλίψεις τῆς καρδίας μου ἐπληθύνθησαν· ἐκ τῶν ἀναγκῶν μου ἐξάγαγέ με.
18	רְאֵ֣ה עׇ֭נְיִי וַעֲמָלִ֑י וְ֝שָׂ֗א לְכׇל־חַטֹּאותָֽי׃	Look upon mine affliction and my pain; and forgive all my sins.	ἴδε τὴν ταπείνωσίν μου καὶ τὸν κόπον μου καὶ ἄφες πάσας τὰς ἁμαρτίας μου.
19	רְאֵֽה־אֹיְבַ֥י כִּי־רָ֑בּוּ וְשִׂנְאַ֖ת חָמָ֣ס שְׂנֵאֽוּנִי׃	Consider mine enemies; for they are many; and they hate me with cruel hatred.	ἴδε τοὺς ἐχθρούς μου, ὅτι ἐπληθύνθησαν καὶ μῖσος ἄδικον ἐμίσησάν με.
20	שׇׁמְרָ֣ה נַ֭פְשִׁי וְהַצִּילֵ֑נִי אַל־אֵ֝ב֗וֹשׁ כִּֽי־חָסִ֥יתִי בָֽךְ׃	O keep my soul, and deliver me: let me not be ashamed; for I put my trust in thee.	φύλαξον τὴν ψυχήν μου καὶ ῥῦσαί με· μὴ καταισχυνθείην, ὅτι ἤλπισα ἐπὶ σέ.
21	תֹּם־וָיֹ֥שֶׁר יִצְּר֑וּנִי כִּ֝֗י קִוִּיתִֽיךָ׃	Let integrity and uprightness preserve me; for I wait on thee.	ἄκακοι καὶ εὐθεῖς ἐκολλῶντό μοι, ὅτι ὑπέμεινά σε, Κύριε.
22	פְּדֵ֣ה אֱ֭לֹהִים אֶת־יִשְׂרָאֵ֑ל מִ֝כֹּ֗ל צָרוֹתָֽיו׃	Redeem Israel, O God, out of all his troubles.	λύτρωσαι, ὁ Θεός, τὸν ᾿Ισραὴλ ἐκ πασῶν τῶν θλίψεων αὐτοῦ.

This psalm has a strong formal relationship with Psalm 34. Both are alphabetic acrostics, both missing the verse beginning with Waw, and both end with an extra verse beginning with Pe, praying for the deliverance of Israel. As an acrostic, the verses in the psalm are arranged according to the Hebrew alphabet, with the exception of the letters Bet, Waw and Qoph which together, according to Jewish interpreters, made reference to the word gehinom (hell).

== Dating ==
In the International Critical Commentary, Charles and Emilie Briggs date this psalm to "the Persian period prior to Nehemiah", that is, between about 539 and 445 BCE.

The 19th-century Baptist preacher Charles Spurgeon claims "it is evidently a composition of David's later days, for he mentions the sins of his youth, and from its painful references to the craft and cruelty of his many foes, it will not be too speculative a theory to refer it to the period when Absalom was heading the great rebellion against him."

== Uses ==
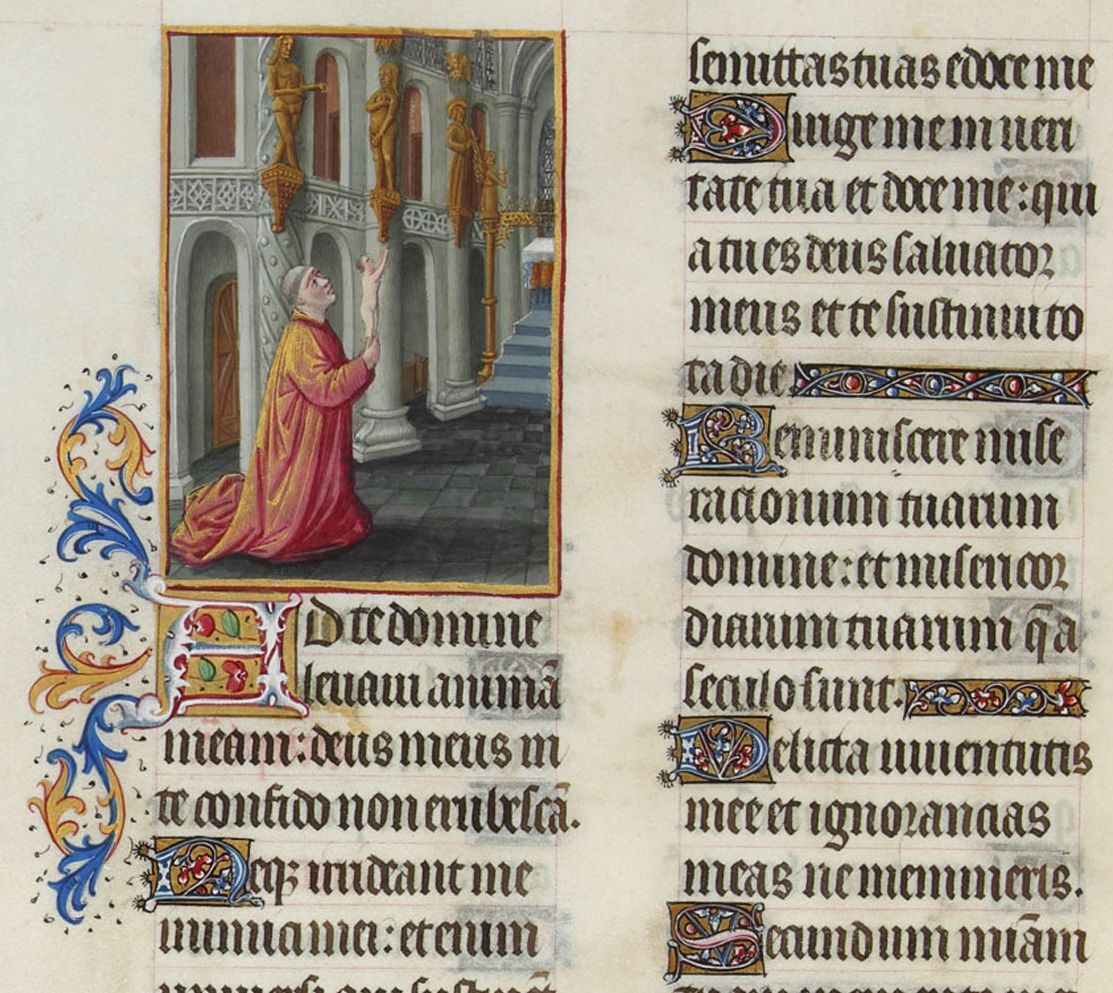
Psalm 25 in Les Très Riches Heures du duc de Berry, Folio 91v - Psalm XXIV (Vulgate) the Musée Condé, Chantilly.

=== Judaism ===
- The psalm is recited as part of tachanun in the Sephardic rite, the Italian rite, and some Chasidic communities (including Chabad).
- Verse 6 is the third verse of V'hu Rachum in Pesukei Dezimra part of the opening paragraph of the long Tachanun recited on Mondays and Thursdays, and part of the final paragraph of the regular Tachanun.

=== Catholic Church ===
This psalm is characterized by confidence of David the penitent king. That is why, from the sixth century, the Church begins the first Sunday of Advent with the first verses sung of it, namely the Introit in Old Roman and Gregorian, pending the Nativity.

Additionally, the Psalm (numbered as the twenty fourth) is traditionally sung at the hour of Prime on Tuesdays.

=== Eastern Orthodox Church ===
In the Eastern Orthodox Church, Psalm 24 (Psalm 25 in the Masoretic Text) is read daily at the Third Hour and at Great Compline. It is part of the fourth Kathisma division of the Psalter, read at Matins on Monday mornings, as well as on Wednesdays during Lent at the Sixth Hour.

=== Coptic Orthodox Church ===
In the Agpeya, the Coptic Church's book of hours, this psalm is prayed in the office of Prime. It is also in the prayer of the Veil, which is generally prayed only by monks.

=== Book of Common Prayer ===
In the Church of England's Book of Common Prayer, this psalm is appointed to be read on the morning of the fifth day of the month.

=== Protestant Christianity ===
A survey of organists in the Dutch Reformed denomination (from May 2000 to May 2001) revealed that Psalm 25 is the third most sung Psalm in Reformed worship services. Only Psalm 119 and Psalm 89 are sung more frequently.

== Musical settings ==
Hymns derived from Psalm 25 include Heinrich Bone's "Zu dir, o Gott, erheben wir", published in 1851.

Richard Farrant (1525-1580) wrote "Call To Remembrance" to the text of verses 5 and 6. Orlando Gibbons composed a five-part anthem in English, O Lord, I lift my heart to thee. Heinrich Schütz composed a setting of metred German text, "Nach dir verlangt mich", SWV 122, as part of the Becker Psalter. Johann Sebastian Bach composed an early cantata, Nach dir, Herr, verlanget mich, BWV 150, which alternates verses from Psalm 25 and poetry by an unknown librettist. Czech composer Antonín Dvořák set verses 16-18 and 20 to music in his Biblical Songs (1894). German composer Lili Wieruszowski (1899-1971) also set Psalm 25 to music.

== Bibliography ==
- Commentaires sur les psaumes, d'Hilaire de Poitiers
- Commentaries on the Psalms, John Chrysostom
- Discourse in the Psalms, Saint Augustine
- Commentaries for the Psalms, Thomas Aquinas 1273
- Commentaries on the Psalms John Calvin 1557
- A Godly and Fruitful Exposition on the Twenty-fifth Psalme, the second of the Penitentials; (in "A Sacred Septenarie.") By ARCHIBALD SYMSON. 1638. p74.
- The Preacher's Tripartie, in Three Books. The First, to raise Devotion in Divine Meditations upon Psalm XXV. By R. MOSSOM, Preacher of God's Word, late at St. Peter's, Paul's Wharf, London, 1657. Folio.
- Six Sermons in "Expository Discourses" by the late Rev. WILLIAM RICHARDSON, Subchanter of York Cathedral. 1825.
