= O clap your hands (Vaughan Williams) =

1920 motet by Ralph Vaughan Williams

- Motet by Ralph Vaughan Williams
- The composer c. 1920
- Key: B-flat major
- Text: from Psalm 47
- Language: English
- Published: 1920
- Scoring: choir; organ; brass; percussion

O clap your hands is a motet by Ralph Vaughan Williams. He composed the anthem, a setting of verses from Psalm 47, in 1920 for a four-part choir, organ, brass, and percussion. He later also made versions for orchestra and for organ. The motet was often recorded.

== History ==
Vaughan Williams was an agnostic but still composed Anglican church music. He said, "There is no reason why an atheist could not write a good Mass." He appreciated the music by Thomas Tallis, William Byrd and other 16th-century composers on English texts.

World War I, for which he had volunteered to serve in the military, left a deep impression. From 1919, he was a teacher of composition at the Royal College of Music. He wrote the anthem O clap your hands, a setting of selected verses from Psalm 47, in 1920. It was published in London by Stainer & Bell the same year. It was often recorded.

A loop from the anthem, performed by the Choir of King's College, Cambridge, and the English Chamber Orchestra, conducted by David Willcocks, was used for the song "Revolution 9" by the Beatles.

== Text and music ==
Vaughan Williams chose verses 1,2,5–8 (in the King James Version numbering) from Psalm 47, a psalm calling to exalt God as the King of "all the earth" with hands, voices and instruments. The Hebrew original mentions the shofar, which is given as trumpet in English.

He set the text in one movement in B-flat major, marked Allegro. He scored it for a four-part choir, organ, brass, and percussion, but also made a version for orchestra and an organ version. The music begins with brass fanfares. A jubilant first section is followed by an introspective middle section. The conclusion is a triumphant climax, repeating the words "Sing praises unto our King, sing praises."

Richard R. Terry, who had conducted the first performance of the composer's Mass in G minor at Westminster Cathedral, wrote to him: "I'm quite sincere when I say that [this] is the work one has all along been waiting for. In your individual and modern idiom you have really captured the old liturgical spirit and atmosphere."
