= Komm, Gott Schöpfer, Heiliger Geist =

Lutheran hymm for Pentecost

- Hymn by Martin Luther
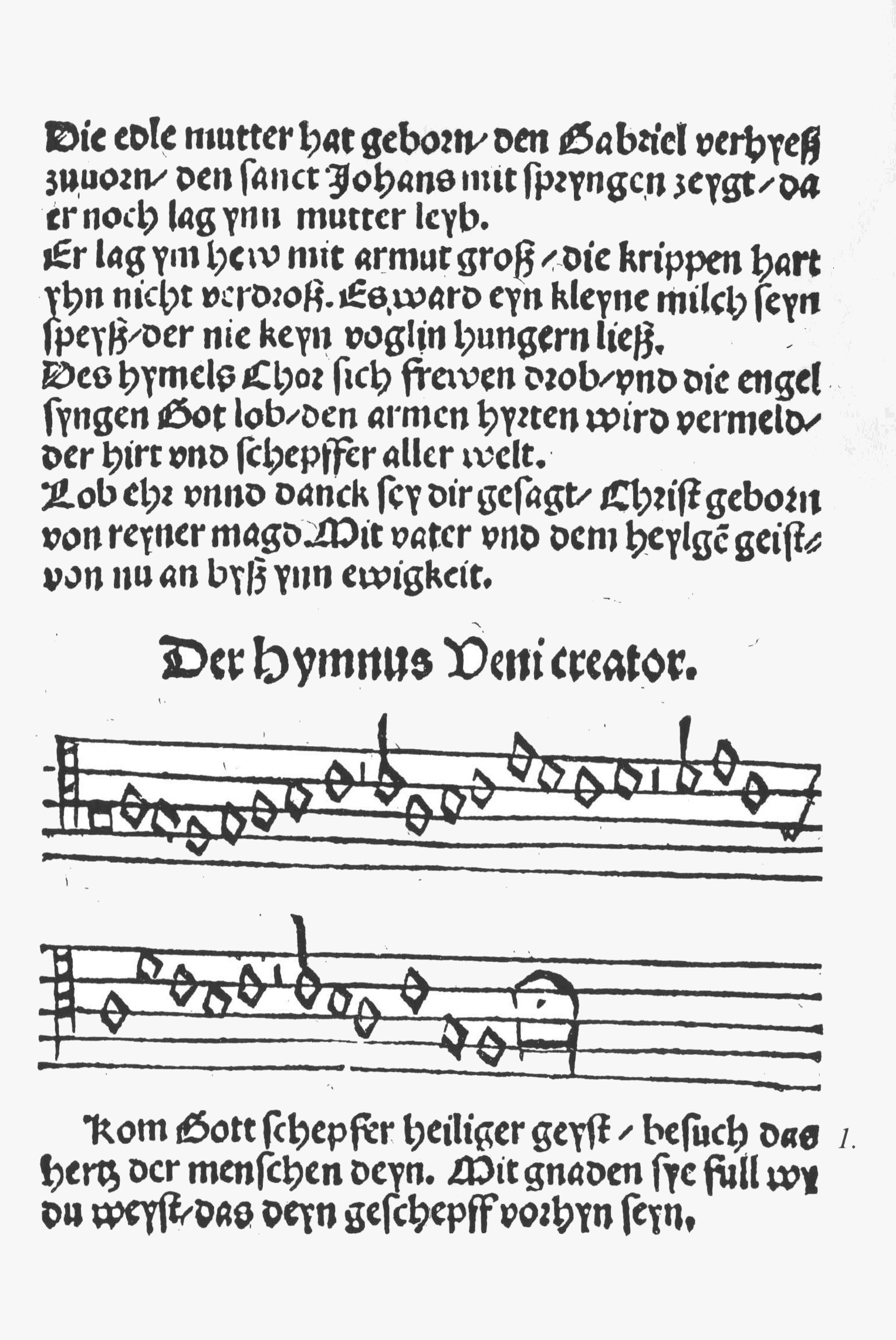
- The first page in the Erfurt Enchiridion, 1524
- English: Come, God Creator, Holy Ghost
- Catalogue: Zahn 294–295
- Text: by Martin Luther
- Language: German
- Based on: "Veni Creator Spiritus"
- Published: 1524

"Komm, Gott Schöpfer, Heiliger Geist" ("Come, God Creator, Holy Ghost") is a Lutheran hymn for Pentecost, with words written by Martin Luther based on the Latin "Veni Creator Spiritus". The hymn in seven stanzas was first published in 1524. Its hymn tunes are Zahn No. 294, derived from the chant of the Latin hymn, and Zahn No. 295, a later transformation of that melody. The number in the current Protestant hymnal Evangelisches Gesangbuch (EG) is 126.

Johann Sebastian Bach composed chorale preludes on the hymn as BWV 631 in the Orgelbüchlein and as BWV 667 in the Great Eighteen Chorale Preludes. The hymn has been translated and has appeared with the hymn tune in several hymnals.

== History ==
Luther wrote the hymn for Pentecost as a paraphrase of the Latin Veni Creator Spiritus in his effort to establish German equivalents to the Latin parts of the liturgy. He derived the melody from the chant of the Latin hymn. The hymn in seven stanzas was first published in 1524, both in the Erfurt Enchiridion and in a setting by Johann Walter in Eyn geystlich Gesangk Buchleyn. The number in the current Protestant hymnal Evangelisches Gesangbuch (EG) is 126.

== Musical settings ==
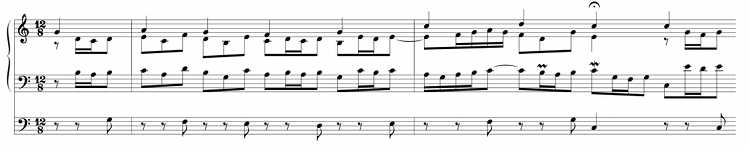
Beginning of BWV 631

Johann Sebastian Bach used the hymn tune Zahn 295 several times, for example setting it as the four-part chorale BWV 370. He also made organ settings for chorale preludes including BWV 631 from the Orgelbüchlein and BWV 667 from the Great Eighteen Chorale Preludes. Arnold Schönberg arranged the latter chorale for large orchestra in 1922.

== Hymn tune and use in English hymnals ==
The hymn has been translated and has appeared to the hymn tune "Komm, Gott Schöpfer" in twelve hymnals, for example "Come, O Creator Spirit Blest", translated by Edward Caswall.
