= Heinrich Bone =

German educator and hymnwriter

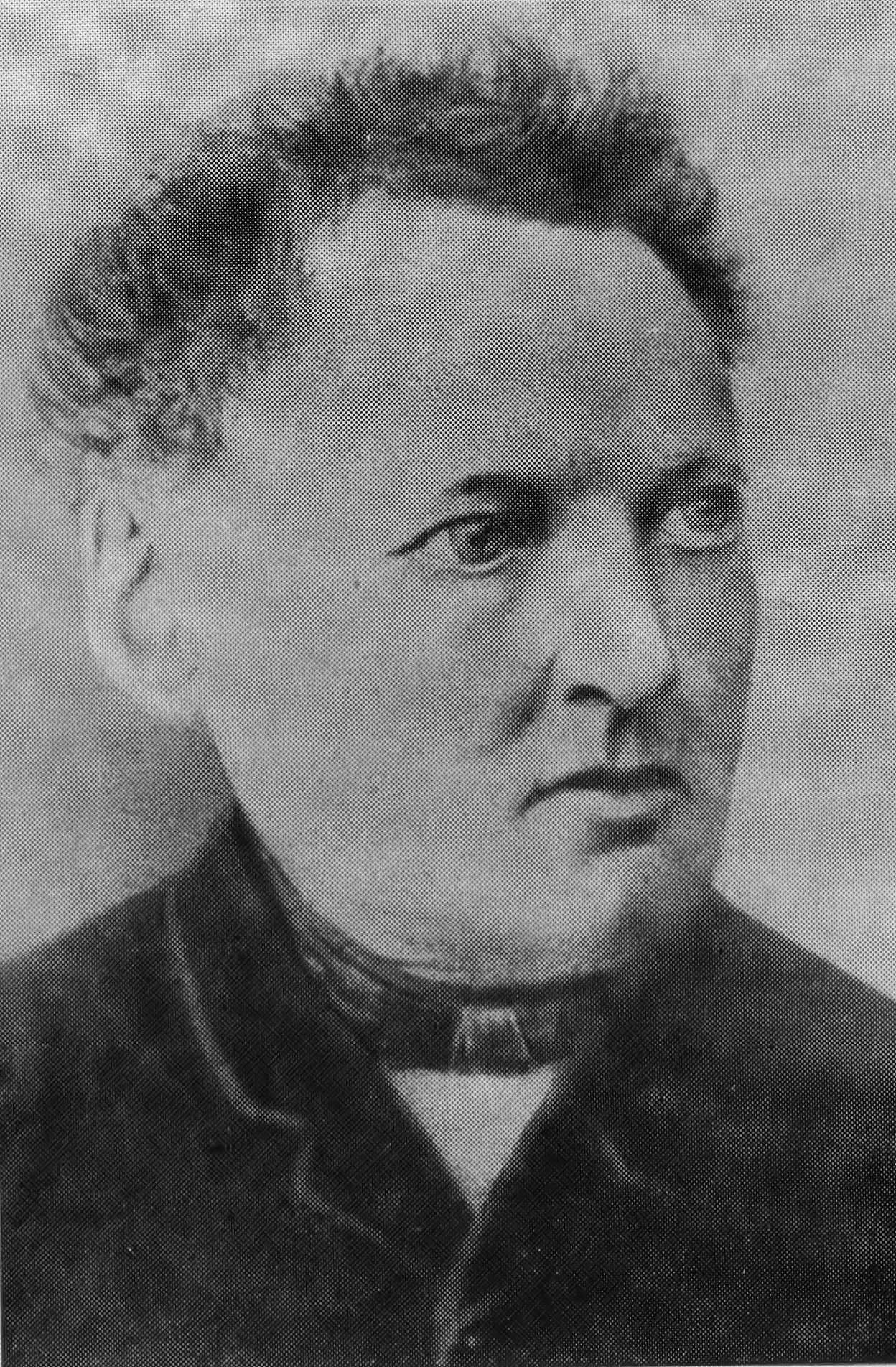
- Heinrich Bone c. 1860
- Born: 25 September 1813; Drolshagen
- Died: 10 June 1893 (aged 79); Hattenheim
- Education: University of Bonn
- Occupations: Educator; School director; Hymnwriter; Editor
- Organization: Rabanus-Maurus-Gymnasium
- Awards: Order of Philip the Magnanimous

Heinrich Bone (25 September 1813 – 10 June 1893) was a German educator and hymnwriter. He wrote a reader for German studies which was used for higher education in Germany, Belgium, Luxembourg and Austria, until it was banned during the Kulturkampf. He published a hymnal, Cantate!, which was used by several Catholic dioceses and became a model for common hymnals. Some of his own hymns, including paraphrases of Latin hymns, are part of recent hymnals, both Catholic and Protestant, such as "Komm, Schöpfer Geist, kehr bei uns ein" as a paraphrase of the 9th-century hymn for Pentecost, Veni Creator Spiritus.

== Life ==
Born in Drolshagen, Bone was the eldest of six children. His parents, Mathäus Bone and his wife Elisabeth, née Kramer, ran a small button factory, an inn and engaged in farming.

Bone attended the Progymnasium in Attendorn from 1825, afterwards the Gymnasium Laurentianum in Arnsberg, and from 1830 the Gymnasium Petrinum Recklinghausen, where he achieved the Abitur in 1831. He studied philology, philosophy and theology at the Rheinische Friedrich-Wilhelms-Universität Bonn, graduating in 1835. He completed the exam for teaching (Höheres Lehramt) with distinction at age 21. From 1835, he was a teacher on probation at the royal Gymnasium in Düsseldorf (now the Görres-Gymnasium). He received a permanent engagement at the Marzellengymnasium (now Dreikönigsgymnasium) in Cologne from 1838. He also taught German at the Höhere Töchterschule der Geschwister Schmitz, which was directed by Christine Schmitz, who later became his wife, and her sisters.

In 1841, Bone was appointed Oberlehrer at the new Rheinische Ritterakademie (now Silverberg-Gymnasium), in Bedburg. Bone became director of the Gymnasium Petrinum in 1856. In 1859, he was appointed director of the Rabanus-Maurus-Gymnasium in Mainz, initiated by Bishop Wilhelm Emmanuel von Ketteler. He was made a Knight 1st Class of the Order of Philip the Magnanimous for his pedagogic achievements in 1864.

Due to the Kulturkampf, Bone was forced into premature retirement on 3 April 1873. In 1876, his German reader Deutsches Lesebuch für höhere Lehranstalten was banned from use in schools in Hesse and Prussia. He moved to Wiesbaden in 1882, after his two sons died, teaching German again at the Höhere Töchterschule. He returned to Mainz in 1890. When he became severely ill in 1892, he moved to Hattenheim, where he died on 10 June 1893.

== Legacy ==
=== Correspondence ===
Bone had a large circle of friends, with whom he corresponded. Clerical leaders included Cardinal Melchior von Diepenbrock of Breslau, Cardinal Johannes von Geissel and Cardinal Philipp Krementz of Cologne, Bishop Wilhelm Emmanuel von Ketteler of Mainz, Christoph Moufang, Bishop Paul Leopold Haffner of Mainz, Johann Anton Friedrich Baudri of Cologne, and Bishop Konrad Martin of Paderborn, who wrote 250 letters to Bone which are extant. Cultural personalities included Philipp Veit, a painter and gallerist with whom he founded a Christlicher Kunstverein (Christian Art Association), the painter Friedrich Overbeck, the musicians Felix Mendelssohn and Max Bruch, and the politician Carl Schurz, who remembered Bone in his memoirs.

=== Pedagogy ===
Bone achieved influence through works such as Deutsches Lesebuch für höhere Lehranstalten, which appeared in two volumes and 67 editions from 1840. It was also used in schools in Belgium, Luxembourg and Austria. Due to the Kulturkampf, it was banned from use in schools in Prussia and Hesse from 1876.

=== Hymns and hymnal ===
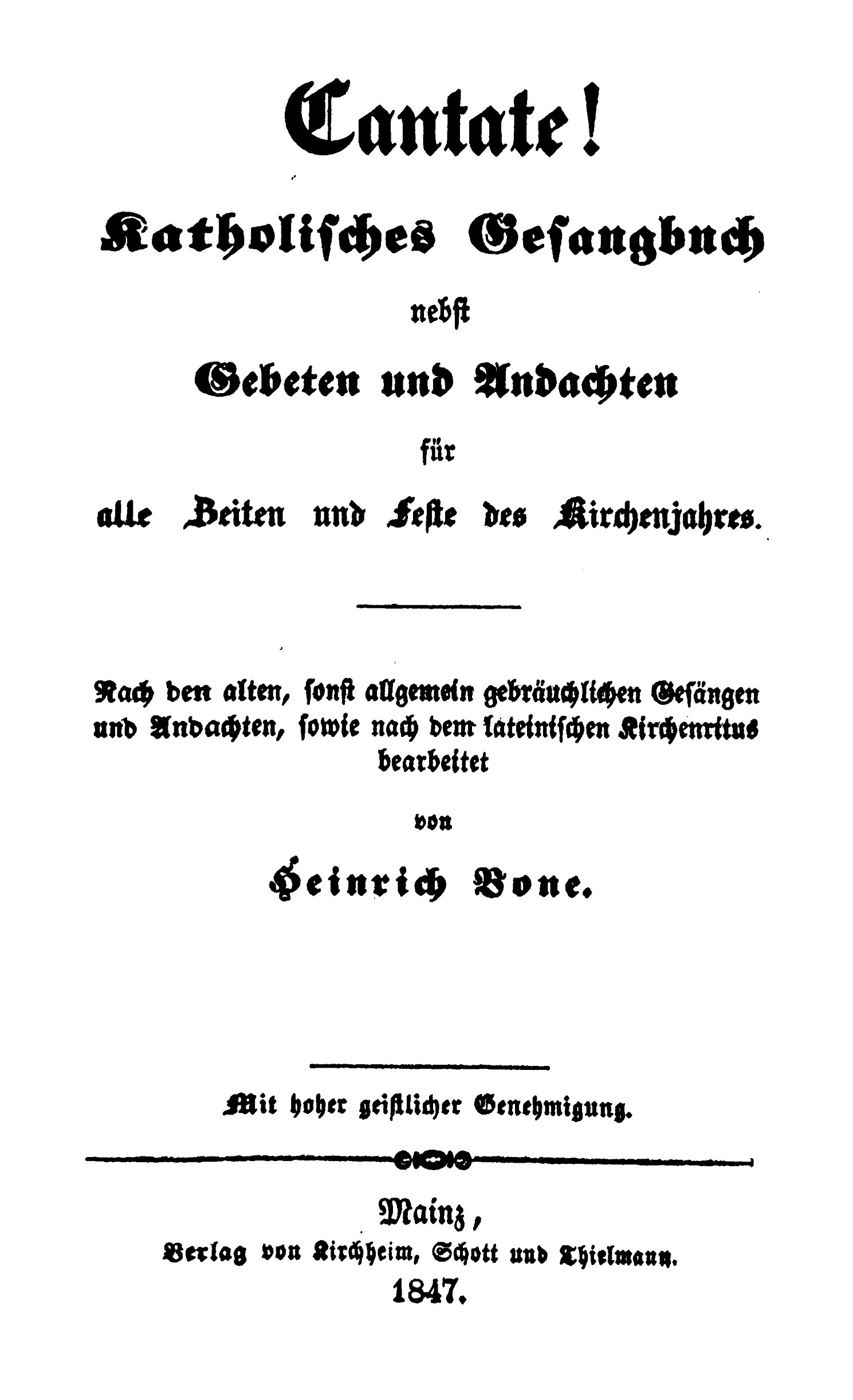
Title page of Cantate!

Bone published the hymnal Cantate! (Sing!), a collection of 444 songs, which appeared between 1847 and 1879 in seven editions. It was the first Catholic hymnal used in multiple German-speaking dioceses. A book with melodies for the songs appeared in 1852. Bone published traditional Latin hymns as the basis for singing in church, and also translated medieval and Baroque texts into contemporary language, such as "Komm, Schöpfer Geist, kehr bei uns ein" as a paraphrase of the 9th-century Veni Creator Spiritus, to make the return of traditional hymns to Catholic services possible. He also wrote new hymns. Some of his creations remain in recent hymnals.

The common German hymnal Gotteslob of 1975 contained several songs from Bone's Cantate!, some with revised wording. Some were included in its second edition of 2013, and some also in the Protestant hymnal EG. In the following list, the GL number refers to the 2013 edition, with the former number in brackets:

- GL 222 (112) "Herr, send herab uns deinen Sohn" for Advent, after Veni, veni, Emmanuel
- GL 258 (158) "Lobpreiset all zu dieser Zeit" for New Year's Day, also EG 550 (West), first two stanzas
- GL 329 (220) "Das ist der Tag, den Gott gemacht" for Easter, stanzas 1,2,5
- GL 351 (245) "Komm, Schöpfer Geist, kehr bei uns ein" for Pentecost, after Veni Creator Spiritus
- GL 142 (462) "Zu dir, o Gott, erheben wir", for the beginning of a service
- GL 532 (584) "Christi Mutter stand mit Schmerzen", a paraphrase of the Stabat Mater
- GL 522 (587) "Maria aufgenommen ist" for Assumption of Mary
- GL 526 (589) "Alle Tage sing und sage", a paraphrase of "Omni die dic Mariae"

The Te Deum paraphrase by Ignaz Franz, "Großer Gott wir loben dich", became popular in the version of text and melody in Cantate!

Hymns in regional sections of the Gotteslob include:

- Wunderschön prächtige" (to Mary)
- "Das Zeichen ist geschehen" (Advent, John the Baptist)
- "Lass erschallen die Posaune" (Advent)
- "Zion, auf, werde licht" (Epiphany)
- "Zu dir in schwerem Leid" (Lent)
- "Am Ölberg in nächtlicher Stille" (Passion of Jesus)
- "Halleluja lasst uns singen" (Easter)
- "O heiligste Dreieinigkeit" (after Friedrich Spee, Trinity Sunday)
- "Nun lasst uns aus der Seele Grund"
- "Vater unser, der du wohnest" (paraphrase of Lord's Prayer)
- "Nun lobet Gott und singet" (Corpus Christi)
- "Christen, seht der Engel Speise" (paraphrase of Lauda Sion)
- "Die Jungfrau auserkoren" (birth of Mary)
- "Johannes, auserkoren" (St. John's Day)
- "Zu der Apostel Preis und Ruhm"
- "Herr, segne ihn, den du erwählt" (consecreation of a priest)
- "Herr, gib Frieden dieser Seele" (Requiem)
- "Dir, Vater, tönt der Lobgesang" (Eucharist).

== Publications ==
- Gedichte. Schreiner, Düsseldorf 1838 (UB Bonn, EDDB Köln, StUB Köln, ULB Düsseldorf) (Digitalisierte Ausgabe der Universitäts- und Landesbibliothek Düsseldorf)
- Legenden. Renard, Köln 1839 (UB Bonn, StUB Köln, EDDB Köln)
- Veilchensamen. Neue Lieder für Kinder. Du Mont-Schauberg, Köln 1840; 1850^{2}; 3., illustr. Ausg. mit 6 Bildern im Farbdruck: Du Mont-Schauberg, Köln 1850 (UB Bonn, EDDB Köln, StUB Köln) Nachdruck 1858; Köln 1867^{4}
- Deutsches Lesebuch für höhere Lehranstalten, zunächst für die unteren und mittleren Klassen der Gymnasien mit Rücksicht auf schriftliche Arbeiten der Schüler, Bd. 1. Dietz, Köln 1840 (ULB Düsseldorf); Bd. 2.: Ebd. 1853; insges. 67 Auflagen
- Cantate! Katholisches Gesangbuch nebst Gebeten und Andachten für alle Zeiten und Feste des Kirchenjahres; Kirchheim, Schott und Thielmann, Mainz 1847; (Digital link); Schöningh Paderborn 1851. (Digital link); 7. Aufl. 1879
- Kleines Cantate. Katholisches Gesangbuch nebst einem vollständigen Gebet- und Andachtsbuche. Paderborn 1851; Ausgabe für Gymnasien: Schöningh, Paderborn 1859 (KPS Münster); Paderborn 1869^{3}
- Ueber den lyrischen Standpunkt bei Auffassung und Erklärung lyrischer Gedichte, mit besonderer Rücksicht auf Horaz. Köln 1851; Schöningh, Paderborn 1852 (ULB Münster)
- Orate! Katholisches Gebet- und Andachtsbuch; Schöningh, Paderborn 1853; Benziger, Einsiedeln 1901^{5}
- Sonette. Du Mont-Schauberg, Köln 1856 (UB Bonn, ULB Düsseldorf, StUB Köln)
- Buch der Altväter oder Bilder und Sprüche aus dem Leben der Einsiedler. Schöningh, Paderborn 1863 (KPS Münster, EDDB Köln)
- Gedenkblätter für Schule und Leben. Reden. Herder, Freiburg/Br. 1873 (StUB Köln, ULB Düsseldorf, KPS Münster)
- Das Te Deum. Foesser, Frankfurt/M. 1880 (KPS Münster)
- Über Roman und Romanlektüre. In: Frankfurter zeitgem. Broschüren N.F. 1880, H. 4, Foesser, Frankfurt/M. 1880, S. 108–132 (ÖB Aachen, StUB Köln)

== Literature ==
- Kurt Abels: Konfession, Lebenswelt und Deutschunterricht. Heinrich Bone (1813–1893) und sein „Deutsches Lesebuch“. In: Ortwin Beisbart, Helga Bleckwenn (ed.): Deutschunterricht und Lebenswelt in der Fachgeschichte (= Beiträge zur Geschichte des Deutschunterrichts, 12). Frankfurt 1994; pp. 115–130.
- Kurt Abels: Heinrich Bone. In: Christoph König (ed.),: Internationales Germanistenlexikon 1800–1950. Band 1: A–G. De Gruyter, Berlin/New York 2003, ISBN 3-11-015485-4.
- Heinrich Alois Keiser: Heinrich Bone, Lebensbild eines deutschen Schulmannes und Schriftstellers. Zug 1897.
- Cassian Stephan Lohmar, CR: Heinrich Bone (1813–1893). Leben und Werk einer Persönlichkeit des 19. Jahrhunderts. Neustift 1993.
- Franz Menge: Heinrich Bone (1813/93). Mainzer Gymnasialdirektor und Kirchenlieddichter. In: Jahrbuch für das Bistum Mainz, Jg. 2 (1947), pp. 33–40.
- Werner Pelz: Die Amtsenthebung von Heinrich Bone. Ein Beitrag zum Kulturkampf im Bistum Mainz. In: Archiv für mittelrheinische Kirchengeschichte (AmrhKg), 1993, pp. 347–358.
