= Alle Tage sing und sage =

Marian hymn in German

- Marian hymn by Anonymous
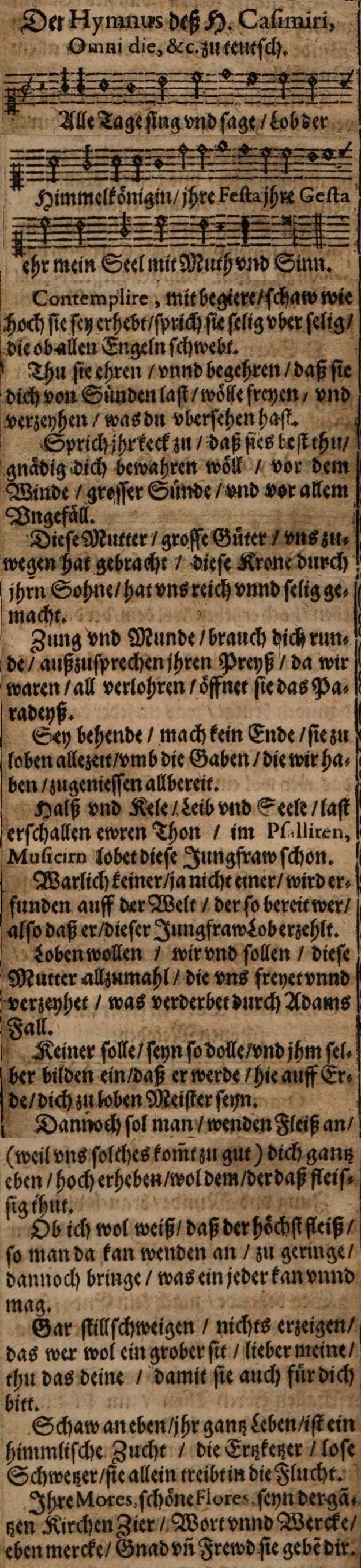
- 1630 version with the melody that is still in use
- English: All days sing and say
- Written: 17th century
- Text: Unknown author, revised by Heinrich Bone, Joseph Mohr and Friedrich Dörr
- Language: German
- Based on: "Omni die dic Mariae"
- Composed: 1613
- listen

"Alle Tage sing und sage" (All days sing and say) is a Marian hymn in German, a 17th-century paraphrase of a Latin hymn "Omni die dic Mariae" which is attributed to Bernard of Cluny. It is part of the 2013 Gotteslob as GL 526.

== History ==
"Alle Tage sing und sage" was written in the 17th century as a paraphrase of a Latin Marian hymn, "Omni die dic Mariae". This song is attributed to Bernard of Cluny, but was believed to have been written by Saint Casimir during the Baroque period. The melody of the hymn in German was first printed in a 1613 hymnal from Ingolstadt and has been used unchanged.

The German version was revised by Heinrich Bone in 16 stanzas in 1847. Four of these stanzas (1, 2, 4 and 6) became part of the common Catholic hymnal in German, Gotteslob, as GL 526.
