= O clap your hands (Rutter) =

- Anthem by John Rutter
- Related: later part of Psalmfest
- Text: Psalm 47
- Language: English
- Dedication: Lionel Dakers and the Incorporated Association of Organists
- Published: 1973
- Scoring: choir; organ or orchestra

O clap your hands is an anthem in English for choir and organ by John Rutter. He composed the setting of verses from Psalm 47 in 1973 for a four-part choir and organ, and also made a version with orchestra. It was first published in 1973. Later, Rutter included it in Psalmfest, a collection of nine psalm settings.

== History and music ==
Rutter composed the psalm setting in 1973 for Lionel Dakers and the Incorporated Association of Organists. He chose verses 1–7 (in the King James Version numbering) from Psalm 47, a psalm calling to exalt God as the king of "all the earth" with hands, voices and instruments. The Hebrew original mentions the shofar, which is given as trumpet in English. The psalm is often associated with the Feast of the Ascension, because it mentions God going up with a shout.

According to the sheet music published by Oxford University Press at OUP.com, Rutter set the text in one movement, marked Bright and rhythmic. He scored it for a four-part choir and organ, but also made a version with orchestra. Beginning in common time, the accompaniment has an ostinato-syncopated rhythm in the bass, grouping the eighth notes in a measure 3 + 3 + 2. Similar patterns were later used for the "Latin exuberance" in Rutter's Magnificat. The upper voices move in parallel scales in even eighth notes, alternating one measure downward and one measure upward. The choir alone enters in unison with a phrase that moves mostly upwards, covering an octave. It picks up the syncope in the stresses of the syllables "clap" and "hands", and runs for the remainder of the first line, ending on another syncope on the word "people". The time changes often allow for a natural declamation of the text, including extra measures of 3/8. A first climax is reached with the words "He is the great King", where the choir is divided in five parts, marked fortissimo. The following verses are given to one part only, with the altos beginning "He shall subdue the people under us", marked tranquillo. The text "O sing praises unto our God" is broader, while "sing ye praises with understanding" is given to the choir a cappella. The anthem ends with a recapitulation of the exuberant beginning, with even more syncopation.

The anthem was published by Oxford University Press in 1973. It was recorded several times, including a 1993 performance conducted by the composer in 1993 with his Cambridge Singers and the City of London Sinfonia, reissued in 2005 as part of an album Gloria : The sacred music of John Rutter, which also contains A Gaelic Blessing and "The Lord bless you and keep you", among many others. In 1997, Klaus Uwe Ludwig conducted the organ version with the Bach-Chor Wiesbaden. Kalevi Kiviniemi was the organist in a 2003 recording with the Harju Kamerkoor conducted by Heikki Limola. On a 2015 recording by the choir of Ely Cathedral, conducted by Paul Trepte, it was connected liturgically to the Feast of Christ the King, concluding the collection.

Rutter included the setting, together with eight other of his psalm settings, in a collection called Psalmfest. This was first recorded in 2014 by St Albans Cathedral Choir, the Abbey Girls' Choir and the Royal Philharmonic Orchestra, conducted by Andrew Lucas. At that time, John Quinn wrote a review of Rutter's intelligent approach to handling the texts, and specifically about O clap your hands: "When I first heard it, many years ago, I didn't much like [it]; the bouncy jollity of the opening in particular seemed a bit relentless to me. I've changed my mind, however; there's more depth than I'd first appreciated in the centre of the setting."
