= Zu dir, o Gott, erheben wir =

- Christian hymn
- Written: 1851
- Text: by Heinrich Bone
- Language: German
- Based on: Psalm 25
- Melody: by Caspar Ulenberg
- Composed: 1582

"Zu dir, o Gott, erheben wir" (To you, O God, we raise [the soul]) is a Christian hymn with German text written by Heinrich Bone in 1851 to a melody by Caspar Ulenberg dating to 1582.

== History ==
Heinrich Bone paraphrased Psalm 25 ("Unto thee, O LORD, do I lift up my soul. ") in 1851. In the Catholic hymnal Gotteslob, it is GL 142, in the section "Gesänge zur Eröffnung" (songs for the opening). The song is part of several hymnals.
