= Komm, Schöpfer Geist, kehr bei uns ein =

1845 German Christian hymn

- Christian hymn
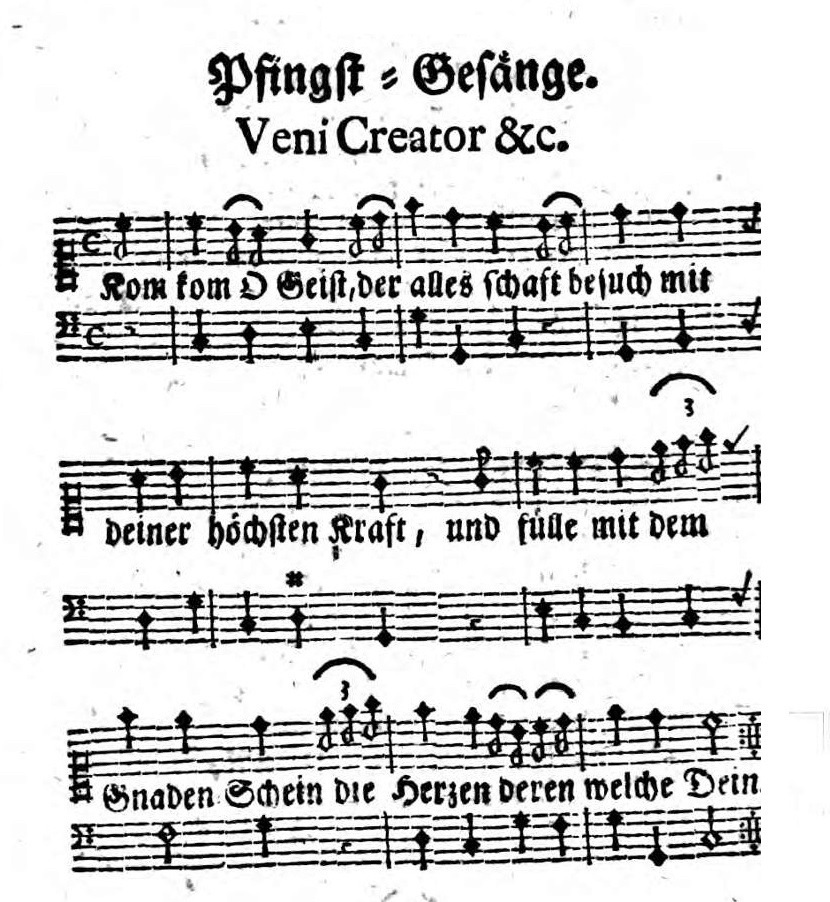
- 1741 printing of the hymn's melody
- English: Come, Creator Spirit, visit us
- Text: by Heinrich Bone
- Language: German
- Based on: Veni Creator Spiritus
- Published: 1845

"Komm, Schöpfer Geist, kehr bei uns ein" (Come, Creator Spirit, visit us) is a Christian hymn in German for Pentecost. The text is a paraphrase by Heinrich Bone of the Latin hymn Veni Creator Spiritus. It was first published in 1845. In the Catholic hymnal Gotteslob, it has the number GL 351.

== History ==
Komm, Schöpfer Geist, kehr bei uns ein is one of many paraphrases of the 9th-century Veni Creator Spiritus which is attributed to Rabanus Maurus. The first version in German was Martin Luther's "Komm, Gott, Schöpfer, Heiliger Geist, published in 1524. Bone's version, in six stanzas as the model, was first published in 1845. It was part of his 1847 hymnal Cantate!. The hymn was included in the first edition of the common German Catholic hymnal Gotteslob in 1975 as GL 245 and GL 351 in its 2013 edition, in the section Pentecost / Holy Spirit.

== Text ==
Latin (GL 341)

Veni, creator Spiritus,
mentes tuorum visita:
imple superna gratia,
quae tu creasti pectora.

Qui diceris Paraclitus,
donum Dei altissimi,
fons vivus, ignis, caritas
et spiritalis unctio.

Tu septiformis munere,
dextrae Dei tu digitus,
tu rite promissum Patris
sermone ditans guttura.

Accende lumen sensibus,
infunde amorem cordibus,
infirma nostri corporis
virtute firmans perpeti.

Hostem repellas longius
pacemque dones protinus;
ductore sic te praevio
vitemus omne noxium.

Per te sciamus da Patrem
noscamus atque Filium,
te utriusque Spiritum
credamus omni tempore.

Deo Patri sit gloria
et Filio, qui a mortuis
surrexit, ac Paraclito,
in saeculorum saecula.

Heinrich Bone (GL 351)

Komm, Schöpfer Geist, kehr bei uns ein,
besuch das Herz der Kinder dein:
Die deine Macht erschaffen hat,
erfülle nun mit deiner Gnad.

Der du der Tröster wirst genannt,
vom höchsten Gott ein Gnadenpfand,
du Lebensbrunn, Licht, Lieb und Glut,
der Seele Salbung, höchstes Gut.

O Schatz, der siebenfältig ziert,
o Finger Gottes, der uns führt,
Geschenk, vom Vater zugesagt,
du, der die Zungen reden macht.

Zünd an in uns des Lichtes Schein,
gieß Liebe in die Herzen ein,
stärk unsres Leibs Gebrechlichkeit
mit deiner Kraft zu jeder Zeit.

Treib weit von uns des Feinds Gewalt,
in deinem Frieden uns erhalt,
dass wir, geführt von deinem Licht,
in Sünd und Elend fallen nicht.

Gib, dass durch dich den Vater wir
und auch den Sohn erkennen hier
und dass als Geist von beiden dich
wir allzeit glauben festiglich.

Dem Vater Lob im höchsten Thron
und seinem auferstandnen Sohn,
dem Tröster auch sei Lob geweiht
jetzt und in alle Ewigkeit. (Note: The last stanza is slightly different in Gotteslob.)
