= Veni Creator Spiritus =

9th-century Latin Christian hymn about the Holy Spirit

- Hymn
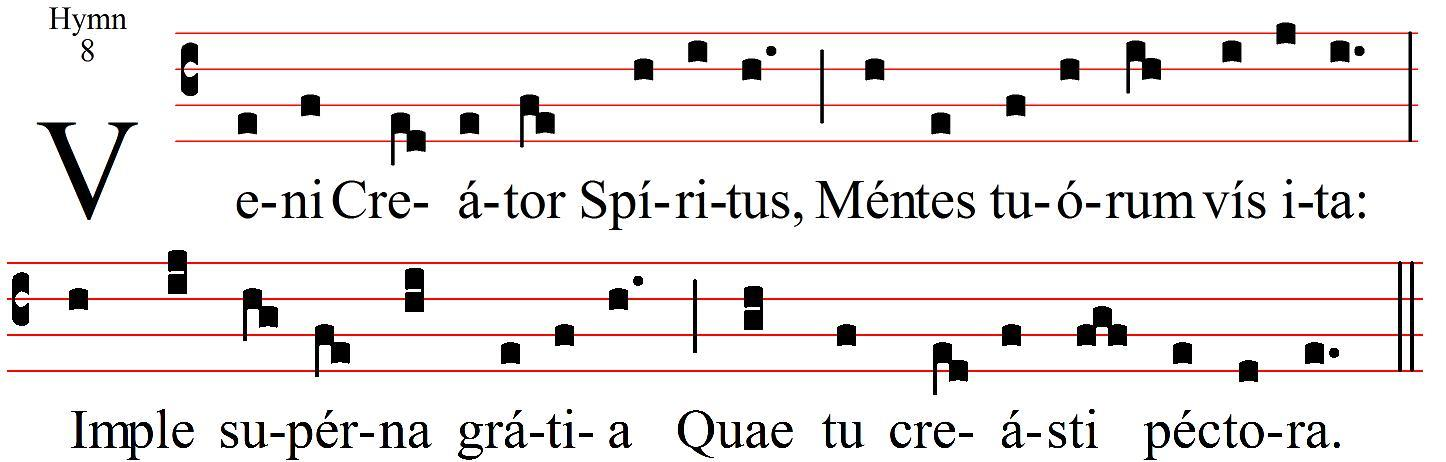
- First verse
- English: Come, Creator Spirit
- Occasion: Pentecost
- Text: c. 809, attributed to Rabanus Maurus
- Language: Latin
- Meter: 8 8 8 8
- Melody: Gregorian chant
- Composed: c. 1000, attributed to Kempten Abbey

Veni Creator Spiritus (Latin: Come, Creator Spirit) is a traditional Christian hymn believed to have been written by Rabanus Maurus, a ninth-century Frankish Benedictine monk, teacher, archbishop, and saint. When the original Latin text is used, it is normally sung to a Gregorian Chant tune first known from Kempten Abbey around the year 1000. The hymn has been translated and paraphrased into several languages, and adapted into many musical forms, often as a hymn for Pentecost or for other occasions that focus on the Holy Spirit.

== Liturgical use ==
Veni Creator Spiritus: Gregorian chant

As an invocation of the Holy Spirit, Veni Creator Spiritus is sung in the Catholic Church during liturgical celebrations on the feast of Pentecost, at both Terce and Vespers. It is also sung at occasions such as the College of Cardinals entering the Sistine Chapel during a papal conclave, the consecration of bishops, the ordination of priests, the profession of members of religious institutes, administering the sacrament of Confirmation, the dedication of churches, the convening of synods or councils, the coronation of monarchs, the Red Mass starting the judicial year, and the beginning of other similar solemn events. It is also traditional to chant the hymn on New Year's Day to obtain a plenary indulgence.

Martin Luther used the hymn as the basis for his Pentecost chorale "Komm, Gott Schöpfer, Heiliger Geist", first performed and published in 1524.

Veni Creator Spiritus is also widely used in Anglican liturgies, where it has appeared since the publication of the 1550 ordinal. Appearances have also appeared, for example, in the ordinal of the 1662 Book of Common Prayer, and in the Novena to The Holy Ghost in Saint Augustine's Prayer Book, which was published in 1947. Bishop John Cosin's 1625 translation, "Come Holy Ghost, our souls inspire" was sung at Charles I of Great Britain's coronation; the same translation has been sung at all British coronations since. Another well-known rendering into English is "Creator Spirit, by whose aid", written in 1690 by John Dryden, and published in The Church Hymn Book (1872, n. 313).

== Text ==
Several variations of the lyrics exist; below are the original ninth-century text and a classicized revision published in 1632 under Pope Urban VIII. The former is used in some Protestant churches and certain Catholic religious orders, while the latter is used in most secular Catholic parishes. A versified English translation follows.

Original text

Veni Creator Spiritus,
Mentes tuorum visita,
Imple superna gratia,
Quæ tu creasti pectora.

Qui Paraclitus diceris,
Donum Dei altissimi
Fons vivus, ignis, caritas,
Et spiritalis unctio.

Tu septiformis munere,
Dexteræ Dei tu digitus,
Tu rite promissum Patris,
Sermone ditans guttura.

Accende lumen sensibus:
Infunde amorem cordibus:
Infirma nostri corporis
Virtute firmans perpeti.

Hostem repellas longius,
Pacemque dones protinus:
Ductore sic te prævio,
Vitemus omne noxium.

Per te sciamus da Patrem,
Noscamus atque Filium;
Te utriusque Spiritum
Credamus omni tempore.

Gloria Patri Domino,
Natoque qui a mortuis
Surrexit, ac Paraclito,
In sæculorum sæcula. Amen.

1632 revision

Veni Creator Spiritus,
Mentes tuorum visita,
Imple superna gratia,
Quæ tu creasti pectora.

Qui diceris Paraclitus,
Altissimi donum Dei,
Fons vivus, ignis, caritas,
Et spiritalis unctio.

Tu septiformis munere,
Digitus Paternæ dexteræ,
Tu rite promissum Patris,
Sermone ditans guttura.

Accende lumen sensibus:
Infunde amorem cordibus:
Infirma nostri corporis
Virtute firmans perpeti.

Hostem repellas longius,
Pacemque dones protinus:
Ductore sic te prævio,
Vitemus omne noxium.

Per te sciamus da Patrem,
Noscamus atque Filium;
Teque utriusque Spiritum
Credamus omni tempore.

Deo Patri sit gloria,
Et Filio qui a mortuis
Surrexit, ac Paraclito,
In sæculorum sæcula. Amen.

English translation

Come, Holy Ghost, Creator blest,
Vouchsafe within our souls to rest;
Come with Thy grace and heav'nly aid
And fill the hearts which Thou hast made.

To Thee, the Comforter, we cry,
To Thee, the Gift of God Most High,
The Fount of life, the Fire of love,
The soul's Anointing from above.

The sev'n-fold gifts of grace are Thine,
O Finger of the Hand Divine;
True Promise of the Father Thou,
Who dost the tongue with speech endow.

Thy light to every thought impart
And shed Thy love in every heart;
The weakness of our mortal state
With deathless might invigorate.

Drive far away our wily Foe,
And Thine abiding peace bestow;
If Thou be our protecting Guide,
No evil can our steps betide.

Make Thou to us the Father known;
Teach us the eternal Son to own
And Thee, whose name we ever bless,
Of both the Spirit, to confess.

Praise we the Father and the Son
And Holy Spirit, with them One;
And may the Son on us bestow
The gifts that from the Spirit flow! Amen.

== Notable English translations ==
Since the English Reformation in the 16th century, there have been more than fifty English-language translations and paraphrases of Veni Creator Spiritus. The version attributed to Archbishop Cranmer (his sole venture into English verse), first appeared in the Prayer Book Ordinal of 1550; it was the only metrical hymn included in the Edwardian liturgy. In 156, John Day included it after the psalms in his incomplete metrical psalter of that year. From 1562 onwards, in The Whole Booke of Psalmes, Day printed Cranmer's version at the start of the metrical paraphrases. In terms of concision and accuracy, Cranmer compares poorly with Luther. Cranmer's sixth stanza, which mentions the Last Judgement and religious strife within Christendom ("the last dreadful day... strife and dissension..."), was a new addition, with no parallel in the Latin original or in Luther's version.

The version included in the 1662 revision of the Book of Common Prayer compressed the content of the original seven verses into four (with a two-line doxology), but retained the Latin title. It was written by Bishop John Cosin for the coronation of King Charles I of Great Britain in 1625. The same words have been used at every coronation since, sung by the choir after the Creed and before the Anointing. The first verse is:

Come, Holy Ghost, our souls inspire
and lighten with celestial fire.
Thou the anointing Spirit art,
who dost Thy sevenfold gifts impart.

At the Coronation of Charles III and Camilla in 2023, the words were sung for the first time in Irish Gaelic, Scots Gaelic and Welsh in addition to English, the three new translations being the work of Iain Urchadan, Damian McManus, and Grahame Davies, respectively.

Another well-known version, by the poet John Dryden, was first published in his Examen Poeticum (1693). It has six-line verses and hence must be sung to a hymn tune in 88 88 88 meter, such as "Melita" by John Bacchus Dykes. Dryden's first verse is:

Creator Spirit, by whose aid
The world's foundations first were laid,
Come, visit every pious mind;
Come, pour Thy joys on humankind;
From sin and sorrow set us free,
And make Thy temples worthy Thee.

== German paraphrases ==
Martin Luther wrote a paraphrase in German, "Komm, Gott Schöpfer, Heiliger Geist" (literally: Come, God Creator, Holy Ghost) as a Lutheran hymn for Pentecost, first published in 1524, with a melody derived from the chant of the Latin hymn. It appears in the Protestant hymnal Evangelisches Gesangbuch as EG 126.

Heinrich Bone published his own German paraphrase in 1845, "Komm, Schöpfer Geist, kehr bei uns ein" (literally: Come, Creator Spirit, visit us), also using an adaptation of the plainchant melody. It appears in the German Catholic hymnal Gotteslob (2013) and in its 1975 predecessor.

A rhymed German translation or paraphrase, "Komm, Heiliger Geist, der Leben schafft" (literally: "Come, Holy Spirit who creates life"), was written by Friedrich Dörr to a melody close to the Gregorian chant, published in 1972. It became part of the Gotteslob hymnal in 1975, and the second edition in 2013, as GL 342 in the section "Pfingsten – Heiliger Geist" (Pentecost – Holy Spirit).

== Musical settings ==
Over the centuries, Veni Creator Spiritus has inspired the following works by notable composers, in approximate chronological order:

- Jehan Titelouze, Veni creator (1623)
- Guillaume-Gabriel Nivers, "L'hymne de la Pentecôte" in his 2e Livre d'Orgue (1667)
- Marc-Antoine Charpentier, 5 settings:
  - Veni creator Spiritus, H.54, for 3 voices (or chorus), 2 violins and continuo (1670s)
  - Veni creator Spiritus, H.66, for soloists, chorus, flutes, bassoons, strings and continuo (1680s)
  - Veni creator Spiritus, H.69, for 1 voice and continuo (1690 ca.)
  - Veni creator Spiritus, H.70, for 1 voice and continuo (1690)
  - Veni creator Spiritus, H.362, for 3 voices and continuo (early 1690s?)
- Michel-Richard Delalande, Veni creator Spiritus S 14 (1689) or S 14 bis (1684)
- Johann Pachelbel, chorale prelude for organ, on "Komm, Gott Schöpfer, Heiliger Geist" (1693)
- Nicolas de Grigny, Veni creator en taille à 5, fugue à 5 for organ (5 versets) (1699)
- Henry Desmarest, Veni creator, for soloists, chorus and orchestra (early 1700s)
- Johann Gottfried Walther, chorale prelude for organ, on "Komm, Gott Schöpfer, Heiliger Geist" (early 1700s)
- Johann Sebastian Bach harmonized "Komm, Gott Schöpfer, Heiliger Geist" for his four-part chorale BWV 370, and also used the tune as the basis for his chorale prelude for organ BWV 631 (1708–1717), which he later extended as BWV 667 (1750).
- Charles-Hubert Gervais, Veni creator (1723)
- Ferdinando Bertoni, Veni creator (1765)
- François Giroust, Veni creator à 4 voix et orchestre (1787)
- Camille Saint-Saëns, Veni creator à 4 voix (1858)
- Hector Berlioz, Veni creator à cappella H 141 (c.1861–1868), a motet for women's voices to the Latin text
- César Franck, Veni creator for two voices (TB) and organ, FWV 68 (1876)
- Anton Bruckner harmonized the original tune for voice and organ as his motet WAB 50 (c. 1884).
- Augusta Holmès, Veni creator for tenor and mixed chorus, IAH 74 (1887)
- Alexandre Guilmant, organ works in L'Organiste liturgiste, Op. 65, Book 1 (1884) and Book 10 (1899)
- Gustav Mahler set the Latin text to music in Part I of his Symphony No. 8 in E-flat major (1906).
- Filippo Capocci, Organ Fantasia on Veni Creator Spiritus (1910)
- Maurice Duruflé used the chant tune as the basis for his symphonic organ composition "Prélude, Adagio et Choral varié sur le thème du Veni Creator", Op. 4 (1926/1930).
- Charles Tournemire, L'Orgue Mystique: In Festo Pentecostes, No. 25, Op. 56 (1928), Deux Fresques Symphoniques Sacrées II, Op. 76 (1939)
- Karol Szymanowski, Veni creator for soprano, mixed chorus, organ and orchestra, Op. 57 (1930)
- Gaston Litaize, Toccata sur le Veni Creator, for organ (1934)
- Marcel Dupré, "Komm, Gott Schöpfer, Heiliger Geist" among his organ settings of 79 Chorales, Op. 28, No. 46 (1931), and Veni creator in the organ suite Le Tombeau de Titelouze, Op. 38, No. 8 (1942)
- Jeanne Demessieux, Veni creator, Toccata for Organ (1947)
- Zoltán Gárdonyi, Partita for Organ Veni creator spiritus (1958)
- Paul Hindemith concluded his Concerto for Organ and Orchestra with a Phantasy on Veni Creator Spiritus (1962).
- Kenneth Leighton Veni Creator Spiritus, Prelude for Organ (1987).
- Krzysztof Penderecki wrote a motet for mixed choir (1987).
- Hilliard Ensemble recorded it on the album "Perotin" (1989).
- Cristóbal Halffter set the text for chorus and orchestra (1992).
- Petr Eben, Toccata for Piano after Gregorian chant Veni creator spiritus (1996)
- Karlheinz Stockhausen used the text in the second hour of his Klang cycle (2005), in a piece for two singing harpists titled Freude (Joy), Op. 82.
- Arvo Pärt, Veni creator (2006)
- Zsolt Gárdonyi, Toccata for Organ Veni creator spiritus (2020)
- Dan Forrest used several lines from the text in his symphonic oratorio CREATION (2023), including the first Introit and tenth Ish Ishah movements.
