= Charles Lockhart (musician) =

English organist and composer

Charles Lockhart (1745 in London, England – February 9, 1815 in London, England), was an English organist and composer of hymn-tunes, best known for the tunes "Tamworth" (1790) and "Carlisle" (1791).
