= Psalm 47 =

Biblical psalm

- "O clap your hands, all ye people"
- Hymn psalm
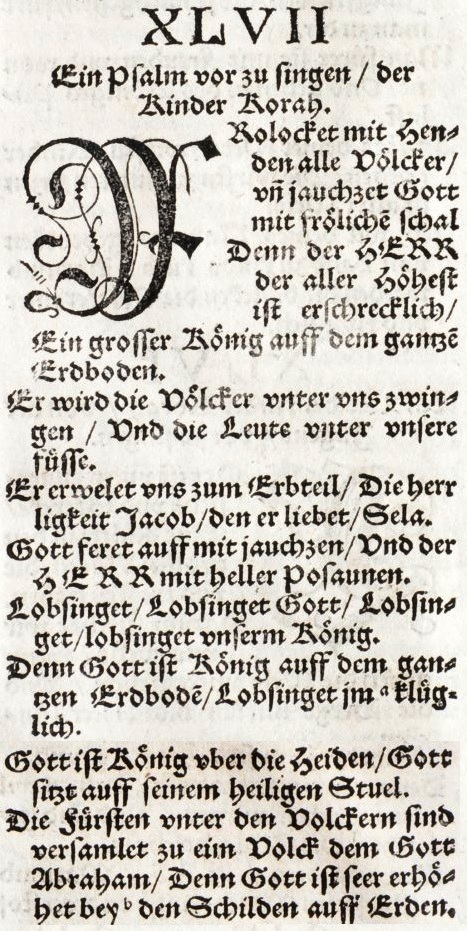
- Psalm 47 in a Luther Bible, 1544
- Other name: Psalm 46; "Omnes gentes plaudite manibus"
- Text: by Korahites
- Language: Hebrew (original)

Psalm 47
- ← Psalm 46 Psalm 48 →
- Book: Book of Psalms
- Hebrew Bible part: Ketuvim
- Order in the Hebrew part: 1
- Category: Sifrei Emet
- Christian Bible part: Old Testament
- Order in the Christian part: 19

Psalm 47 is the 47th psalm of the Book of Psalms, beginning in English in the King James Version: "O clap your hands". The Book of Psalms is the third section of the Hebrew Bible, and a book of the Christian Old Testament. In the slightly different numbering system used in the Greek Septuagint and Latin Vulgate translations of the Bible, this psalm is Psalm 46. In Latin, it is known as "Omnes gentes plaudite manibus". The psalm is a hymn psalm. It is one of twelve psalms attributed to the sons of Korah, and one of fifty-five psalms addressed to the "Chief Musician" or "Conductor".

The psalm forms a regular part of Jewish, Catholic, Lutheran, Anglican and other Protestant liturgies. It has often been set to music, notably by Heinrich Schütz, Ralph Vaughan Williams, John Rutter and Oskar Gottlieb Blarr.

== Background ==
In Jewish tradition, Psalm 47 is one of 12 psalms attributed to the sons of Korah. It is also classified as part of the "Elohistic Psalter" (Psalms 42–83), which includes psalms referring to God as Elohim rather than YHWH. Psalm 47 is also grouped with other psalms that declare God's kingship, as stated in verse 7.

In Christian scholarship, Psalm 47 is one of seven "enthronement psalms" which refer to the crowning of God as king at a festive occasion. It has also been suggested that the theme of Psalm 47 is "universal rejoicing for God's universal reign".

According to Christian scholars, verse 6 (verse 5 in the KJV), "God has gone up with a shout", indicates that the psalm was written when King David brought the Ark of the Covenant to Mount Zion. Alternately, it is an allusion to the Ascension of Jesus to the heavenly Zion after completing his mission on earth.

== Themes ==
This psalm is an expansion of the thought underlying Psalm 46:10: Be still, and know that I am God; I will be exalted among the nations, I will be exalted in the earth! It is all the nations of the world who are addressed.

Psalm 47 includes allusions to Rosh Hashanah, the day of judgment in Judaism. Verse 6, which cites the shofar that is blown on Rosh Hashanah, further hints at God ascending his thrones of judgment and mercy, themes that resonate with the day of judgment. The connection is explained in the Midrash:

Yehuda bar Nahmani began in the name of Shimon ben Lakish: "Elohim ascends amidst shouting, YHWH to the blast of the shofar" (Psalms 47:6). When the Holy One ascends to sit on the throne of judgment, it is in order to render strict justice, as it says, "Elohim ascends amidst shouting". When the Jews take up their shofars and sound them, immediately "YHWH to the blast of the shofar". What does the Holy One do? Arises from the throne of judgment, sits on the throne of mercy, is filled with mercy towards them and transforms the attribute of strict justice into the attribute of mercy for their sake. When? On Rosh Hashanah (Leviticus Rabbah 29:3).

Verse 6 also alludes to the trumpet or shofar blowing at the conclusion of the holiday of Yom Kippur, when the Divine Presence, which has rested upon the Jewish people throughout the day of atonement, returns to heaven. This verse can be translated, "God ascends with a teruah", teruah being a reference to the sound of the shofar.

== Uses ==
=== Judaism ===
Psalm 47 is recited seven times prior to the shofar blowing on Rosh Hashanah. These seven repetitions correspond to the seven mentions of Elohim (God) in this psalm, as well as allude to the seven heavens which God created.

Verse 6 is one of the ten verses included in the grouping known as Shofarot (verses related to shofar-blowing), recited during the Mussaf prayer on both days of Rosh Hashanah.

According to the Siddur Avodas Yisrael, Psalm 47 is recited as the Song of the Day on the second day of Rosh Hashanah.

=== Christianity ===
Since the line "God is gone up with a shout" has been related to the Ascension of Jesus, the psalm is used in liturgies on this feast day.

==== Coptic Orthodox Church ====
In the Agpeya, the Coptic Church's book of hours, this psalm is prayed in the office of Terce.

==== Anglican Church ====
In the Anglican Church's Book of Common Prayer, Psalm 47 is part of the Evening Prayer on Day 9, along with Psalm 48 and Psalm 49. It is also one of the proper psalms for Evensong on Ascension Day.

== Musical settings ==
The psalm and selected verses have often been set to music, focusing on the call to clap and sing, and related to the line "God is gone up with a shout" which has been related to the Ascension of Jesus. Heinrich Schütz set the psalm in German as part with the text from the Becker Psalter, "Frohlockt mit Freud, ihr Völker all", for choir as his SWV 144. Marc-Antoine Charpentier set in 1683 - 85 one "Omnes gentes plaudite manibus" H.192, for 3 voices, 2 treble instruments and continuo. Johann Sebastian Bach began a cantata for Ascension with three verses from the psalm, Gott fähret auf mit Jauchzen, BWV 43, first performed in 1726. Carl Martin Reinthaler set the complete psalm in German for choir, Frohlocket mit Händen, alle Völker. In 1904, Florent Schmitt composed a setting for soprano solo, choir, organ and orchestra, called Psaume XLVII.

Orlando Gibbons (1583-1625) set the psalm in English for choir. Ralph Vaughan Williams set the psalm in English in 1920 as O clap your hands, a motet for chorus and orchestra. Lili Wieruszowski (1899-1971) also composed a musical setting for the psalm. John Rutter set verses 1 to 7, O clap your hands, for choir and organ or orchestra in 1973. Oskar Gottlieb Blarr composed a setting for soprano, tenor, choir (ad lib.), trumpet, trombone, percussion (steel drums), violin, harp and double bass in 1998. Rory Cooney set Psalm 47 for Ascension, subtitled God Mounts His Throne in 2003, scored for soloist, three-part choir, the assembly, and brass. It can also be performed in a reduced version with guitar accompaniment.

Many hymns are modelled after Psalm 47. They include the English The Universal Sovereignty of Christ with the incipit "Rejoice, ye people, homage give", published in 1902, and the German "Völker aller Land", written by Georg Thurmair in 1964 and revised 1971, when it was selected to appear in the German Catholic hymnal Gotteslob of 1975. Even more hymns pick up topics from Psalm 47, including "Praise to the Lord, the Almighty", which paraphrases verses 6–9.

== Text ==
The following table shows the Hebrew text of the Psalm with vowels, alongside the Koine Greek text in the Septuagint and the English translation from the King James Version. Note that the meaning can slightly differ between these versions, as the Septuagint and the Masoretic Text come from different textual traditions. (Note: A 1917 translation directly from Hebrew to English by the Jewish Publication Society can be found here or here, and an 1844 translation directly from the Septuagint by L. C. L. Brenton can be found here. Both translations are in the public domain.) In the Septuagint, this psalm is numbered Psalm 46.

#	Hebrew	English	Greek
(Note: In the Jewish verse numbering, the ascription of this psalm is verse 1, and the rest of the psalm begins from verse 2. However, the Christian verse numbering does not count the ascription as a separate verse.)	לַמְנַצֵּ֬חַ ׀ לִבְנֵי־קֹ֬רַח מִזְמֽוֹר׃	(To the chief Musician, A Psalm for the sons of Korah.)	Εἰς τὸ τέλος· ὑπὲρ τῶν υἱῶν Κορὲ ψαλμός. -
1	כׇּֽל־הָ֭עַמִּים תִּקְעוּ־כָ֑ף הָרִ֥יעוּ לֵ֝אלֹהִ֗ים בְּק֣וֹל רִנָּֽה׃	O clap your hands, all ye people; shout unto God with the voice of triumph.	ΠΑΝΤΑ τὰ ἔθνη κροτήσατε χεῖρας, ἀλαλάξατε τῷ Θεῷ ἐν φωνῇ ἀγαλλιάσεως.
2	כִּֽי־יְהֹוָ֣ה עֶלְי֣וֹן נוֹרָ֑א מֶ֥לֶךְ גָּ֝ד֗וֹל עַל־כׇּל־הָאָֽרֶץ׃	For the LORD most high is terrible; he is a great King over all the earth.	ὅτι Κύριος ὕψιστος, φοβερός, βασιλεὺς μέγας ἐπὶ πᾶσαν τὴν γῆν.
3	יַדְבֵּ֣ר עַמִּ֣ים תַּחְתֵּ֑ינוּ וּ֝לְאֻמִּ֗ים תַּ֣חַת רַגְלֵֽינוּ׃	He shall subdue the people under us, and the nations under our feet.	ὑπέταξε λαοὺς ἡμῖν καὶ ἔθνη ὑπὸ τοὺς πόδας ἡμῶν·
4	יִבְחַר־לָ֥נוּ אֶת־נַחֲלָתֵ֑נוּ אֶ֥ת־גְּא֨וֹן יַעֲקֹ֖ב אֲשֶׁר־אָהֵ֣ב סֶֽלָה׃	He shall choose our inheritance for us, the excellency of Jacob whom he loved. Selah.	ἐξελέξατο ἡμῖν τὴν κληρονομίαν αὐτοῦ, τὴν καλλονὴν ᾿Ιακώβ, ἣν ἠγάπησεν. (διάψαλμα).
5	עָלָ֣ה אֱ֭לֹהִים בִּתְרוּעָ֑ה יְ֝הֹוָ֗ה בְּק֣וֹל שׁוֹפָֽר׃	God is gone up with a shout, the LORD with the sound of a trumpet.	ἀνέβη ὁ Θεὸς ἐν ἀλαλαγμῷ, Κύριος ἐν φωνῇ σάλπιγγος.
6	זַמְּר֣וּ אֱלֹהִ֣ים זַמֵּ֑רוּ זַמְּר֖וּ לְמַלְכֵּ֣נוּ זַמֵּֽרוּ׃	Sing praises to God, sing praises: sing praises unto our King, sing praises.	ψάλατε τῷ Θεῷ ἡμῶν, ψάλατε, ψάλατε τῷ βασιλεῖ ἡμῶν, ψάλατε,
7	כִּ֤י מֶ֖לֶךְ כׇּל־הָאָ֥רֶץ אֱלֹהִ֗ים זַמְּר֥וּ מַשְׂכִּֽיל׃	For God is the King of all the earth: sing ye praises with understanding.	ὅτι βασιλεὺς πάσης τῆς γῆς ὁ Θεός, ψάλατε συνετῶς.
8	מָלַ֣ךְ אֱ֭לֹהִים עַל־גּוֹיִ֑ם אֱ֝לֹהִ֗ים יָשַׁ֤ב ׀ עַל־כִּסֵּ֬א קׇדְשֽׁוֹ׃	God reigneth over the heathen: God sitteth upon the throne of his holiness.	ἐβασίλευσεν ὁ Θεὸς ἐπὶ τὰ ἔθνη, ὁ Θεὸς κάθηται ἐπὶ θρόνου ἁγίου αὐτοῦ.
9	נְדִ֘יבֵ֤י עַמִּ֨ים ׀ נֶאֱסָ֗פוּ עַם֮ אֱלֹהֵ֢י אַבְרָ֫הָ֥ם כִּ֣י לֵ֭אלֹהִים מָֽגִנֵּי־אֶ֗רֶץ מְאֹ֣ד נַֽעֲלָֽה׃	The princes of the people are gathered together, even the people of the God of Abraham: for the shields of the earth belong unto God: he is greatly exalted.	ἄρχοντες λαῶν συνήχθησαν μετὰ τοῦ Θεοῦ ῾Αβραάμ, ὅτι τοῦ Θεοῦ οἱ κραταιοὶ τῆς γῆς σφόδρα ἐπήρθησαν.
