= Protestant liturgy =

Protestant liturgy or Evangelical liturgy is a pattern for worship used (whether recommended or prescribed) by a Protestant congregation or denomination on a regular basis. The term liturgy comes from Greek and means "public work". Liturgy is especially important in the Historical Protestant churches, while evangelical churches tend to be very flexible and in some cases have no liturgy at all. It often but not exclusively occurs on Sunday.

== Types ==
=== Communion liturgies ===
A Lutheran pastor administers the Eucharist during the Divine Service at the chancel rails.

Lutherans have retained and utilized much of the Roman Catholic mass since the early modifications by Martin Luther. The general order of the mass and many of the various aspects remain similar between the two traditions. Latin titles for the sections, psalms, and days have been widely retained, but more recent reforms have omitted this. Recently, Lutherans have adapted much of their revised mass to coincide with the reforms and language changes brought about by post–Vatican II changes.

Protestant traditions vary in their liturgies or "orders of worship" (as they are commonly called). Other traditions in the west often called "Mainline" have benefited from the Liturgical Movement which flowered in the mid/late 20th century. Over the course of the past several decades, these Protestant traditions have developed remarkably similar patterns of liturgy, drawing from ancient sources as the paradigm for developing proper liturgical expressions. Of great importance to these traditions has been a recovery of a unified pattern of Word and Sacrament in Lord's Day liturgy.

Many other Protestant Christian traditions (such as the Pentecostal/Charismatics, Assembly of God, and Non-denominational churches), while often following a fixed "order of worship", tend to have liturgical practices that differ from that of the broader Christian tradition.

=== Divine office ===
The term "Divine Office" describes the practice of "marking the hours of each day and sanctifying the day with prayer".

In Lutheranism, the offices were also combined into the two offices of Matins and Vespers, both of which are still maintained in modern Lutheran prayer books and hymnals. A common practice among Lutherans in America is to pray these offices mid-week during Advent and Lent. The office of Compline is also found in some Lutheran worship books and more typically used in monasteries and seminaries (cf. The Brotherhood Prayer Book).

In Anglican churches, as with Lutheranism, the offices were combined into two offices: Morning Prayer and Evening Prayer, the latter sometimes known as Evensong. In more recent years, the Anglicans have added the offices of Noonday and Compline to Morning and Evening Prayer as part of the Book of Common Prayer. The Anglican Breviary, containing 8 full offices, is not the official liturgy of the Anglican Church.

== Rites ==
Protestant liturgy and ritual families are primarily influenced by the theological development of the regions.

=== Western rites ===
Extant
- Germanic Rites or Lutheran Rites (used by the Lutheran church)
  - German rite (in Germany)
  - Scandinavian rite (in Sweden, Finland and Baltics: Estonia, Latvia)
  - Apostolic Lutheran rite or Laestadianism rite (in some parishes of Finland)
- Iberian Rites
  - Mozarabic Rite (in Portugal and Spain) used by the Lusitanian Catholic Apostolic Evangelical Church and the Spanish Reformed Episcopal Church
- British rites
  - Book of Common Prayer (in England, Wales, Nigeria, Uganda, Australia, New Zealand and several other regional Anglican churches)
  - Methodist liturgy
- Genevan Rites or Reformed rites
  - Genevan Rite or Calvin's rite (in Netherlands, Geneva (Switzerland))
  - Celtic (presbyterian) rite (in Scotland)
  - Waldensian rite (in the alps)
- Czech or Hussite family
  - Hussite rite (in Czechoslovakia and in some parishes of the Moravian Church)
- Rites in a broad sense (not using a strict liturgy)
  - Contemporary Service used mostly by charismatic and independent congregations

=== Eastern rites ===
Extant
- Antiochene Family (West Syriac)
  - Malankara Rite used by Malankara Mar Thoma Syrian Church
- Edessean Family (East Syriac)
  - East Syriac rite, used by Assyrian Evangelical Church
  - Neo Aramaic use, used by Assyrian Pentecostal Church
- Byzantine Family
  - Byzantine rite, in Romania, and east congregations such as Ukrainian Lutheran church, Evangelical Church of the Augsburg Confession in Slovenia and Society for Eastern Rite Anglicanism
- Armenian rite used by Armenian Evangelical Church

== Liturgical rites by denomination ==
Different Christian traditions have employed different rites:

=== Historical Protestantism ===
==== Lutheranism ====
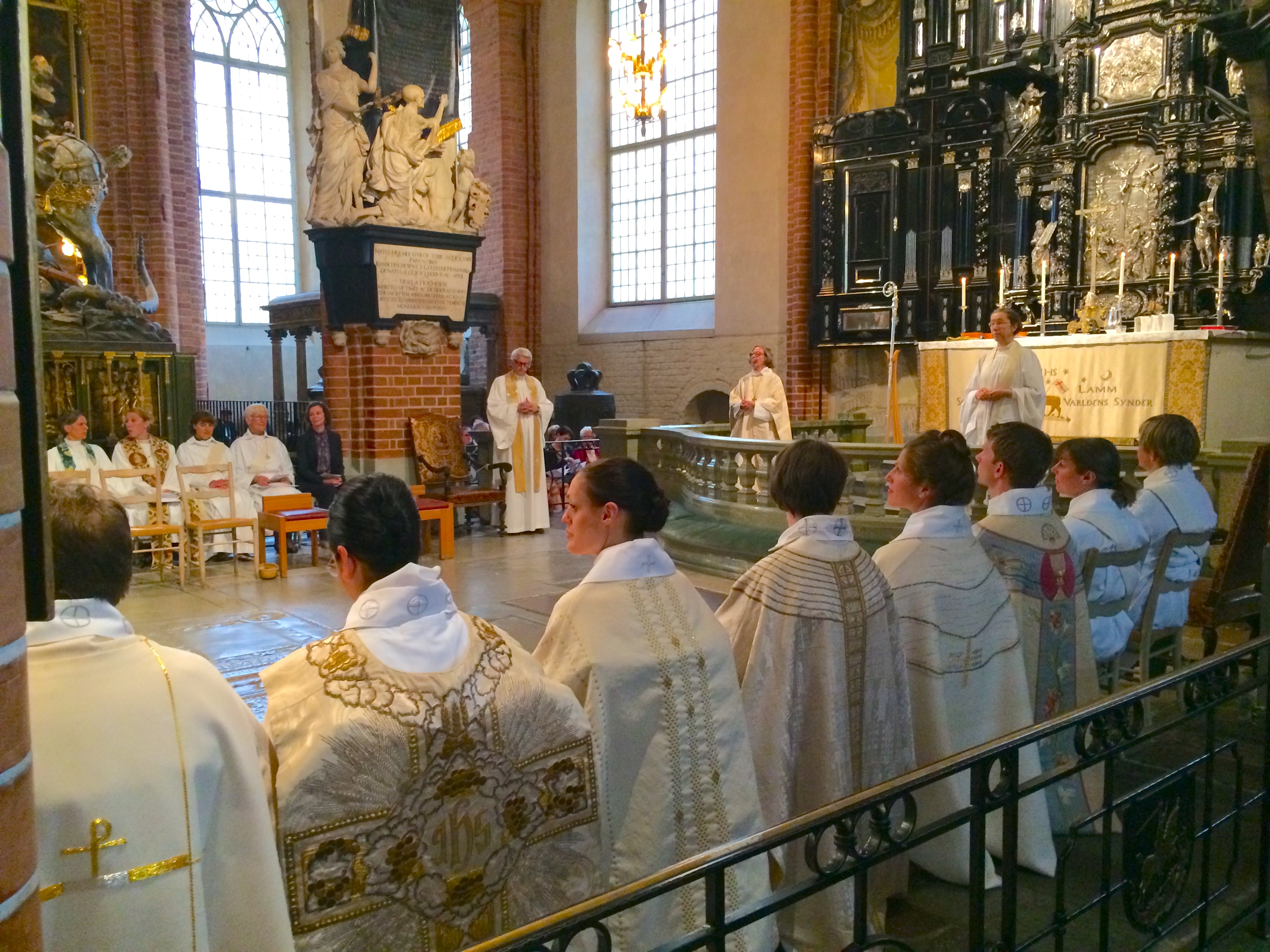
A Lutheran Ordination Mass of the Church of Sweden, in which 7 priests and 2 deacons received Holy Orders.

In the parts of North American Lutheranism that use it, the term "Divine Service" supplants more usual English-speaking Lutheran names for the Mass: "The Service" or "The Holy Communion." The term is a calque of the German word Gottesdienst (literally "God-service" or "service of God"), the standard German word for worship.

As in the English phrase "service of God," the genitive in "Gottesdienst" is arguably ambiguous. It can be read as an objective genitive (service rendered to God) or a subjective genitive (God's "service" to people). While the objective genitive is etymologically more plausible, Lutheran writers frequently highlight the ambiguity and emphasize the subjective genitive. This is felt to reflect the belief, based on Lutheran doctrine regarding justification, that the main actor in the Divine Service is God himself and not man, and that in the most important aspect of evangelical worship God is the subject and we are the objects: that the Word and Sacrament are gifts that God gives to his people in their worship.

Although the term Mass was used by early Lutherans (the Augsburg Confession states that "we do not abolish the Mass but religiously keep and defend it") and Luther's two chief orders of worship are entitled "Formula Missae" and "Deutsche Messe"—such use has decreased in English usage except among Evangelical Catholics and "High Church Lutherans". Also, Lutherans have historically used the terms "Gottesdienst" or "The Service" to distinguish their Service from the worship of other protestants, which has been viewed as focusing more on the faithful bringing praise and thanksgiving to God.

Various forms of the liturgy are used by Lutherans:

- Latin Liturgy of Martin Luther, a form of Pre-Tridentine Mass, based on Formula missae, used mostly in Evangelical Catholic Lutheran and some high church Lutheran churches
- Byzantine rite or known as Divine Liturgy, used by eastern Lutheranism
- German Liturgy of Martin Luther or Deutsche Messe, mostly in western Lutheranism, known as Divine Service among Conservative Lutherans and Holy Communion or The Eucharist among progressive Lutherans

==== Reformed ====
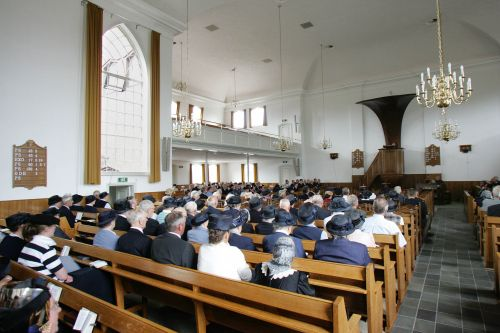
Congregants attend the Divine Service in a Dutch Reformed Church, Doornspijk

The origins of the liturgy are in John Calvin's Geneva, which became the model for all continental Reformed worship, and by the end of the sixteenth century a fixed liturgy was being used by all Reformed churches. Dutch Reformed churches developed an order of worship in refugee churches in England and Germany which was ratified at synods in Dordrecht in 1574 and 1578. The form emphasizes self-examination between the words of institution and communion consisting of accepting the misery of one's sin, assurance of mercy, and turning away those who are unrepentant. Calvin did not insist on having explicit biblical precedents for every element of worship, but looked to the early church as his model and retained whatever he considered edifying. The liturgy was entirely in the vernacular, and the people were to participate in the prayers.

- John Calvin's Order of Worship, or known as Geneva liturgy, based on Regulative principle of worship, used mostly in Calvinism and some presbyterian churches
- John Knox's Liturgy, based on Book of Common Order, used mostly in Presbyterianism, especially in the Church of Scotland.

==== Anglicanism ====
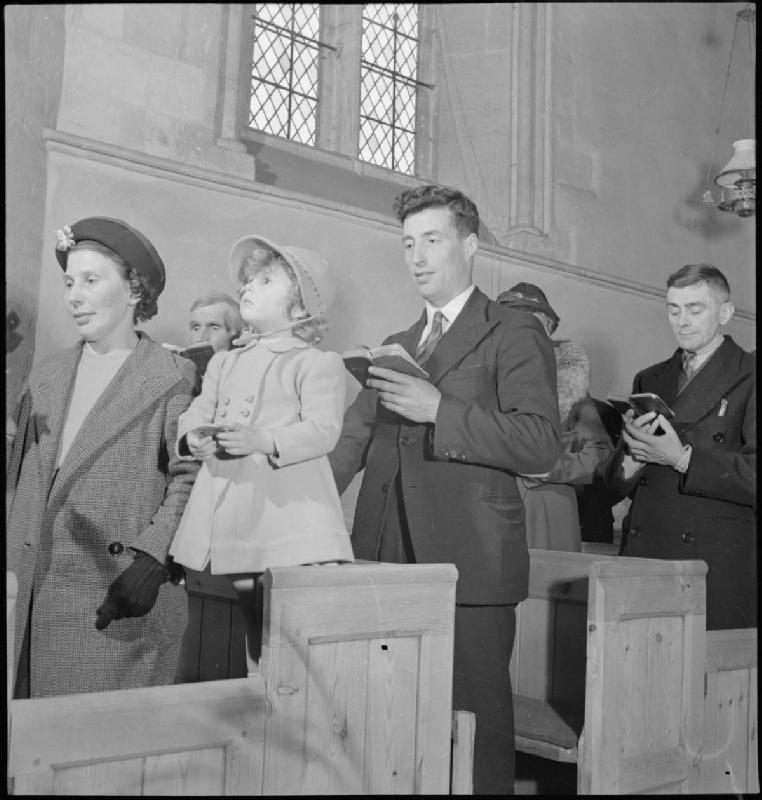
Worship in an Anglican congregation belonging to the Church of England.

At the time of English Reformation, the Sarum Rite was in use along with the Roman Rite. Reformers in England wanted the Latin mass translated into the English language. Archbishop of Canterbury Thomas Cranmer authored the Exhortation and Litany in 1544. This was the earliest English-language service book of the Church of England, and the only English-language service to be finished within the lifetime of King Henry VIII. In 1549, Cranmer produced a complete English-language liturgy. Cranmer was largely responsible for the first two editions of the Book of Common Prayer. The first edition was predominantly pre-Reformation in its outlook. The communion service, lectionary, and collects in the liturgy were translations based on the Sarum Rite as practised in Salisbury Cathedral.

The revised edition in 1552 sought to assert a more clearly Protestant liturgy after problems arose from conservative interpretation of the mass on the one hand, and a critique by Martin Bucer on the other. Successive revisions are based on this edition, though important alterations appeared in 1604 and 1662. The 1662 edition is still authoritative in the Church of England and has served as the basis for many of the Books of Common Prayer of national Anglican churches around the world. Those deriving from Scottish Episcopal descent, such as the Prayer Books of the American Episcopal Church, have a slightly different liturgical pedigree.

- Anglican tradition, also known as Anglican rite, based on Book of Common Prayer
- Exhortation and Litany (1544), Protestant predecessor of the Book of Common Prayer

==== Methodism ====
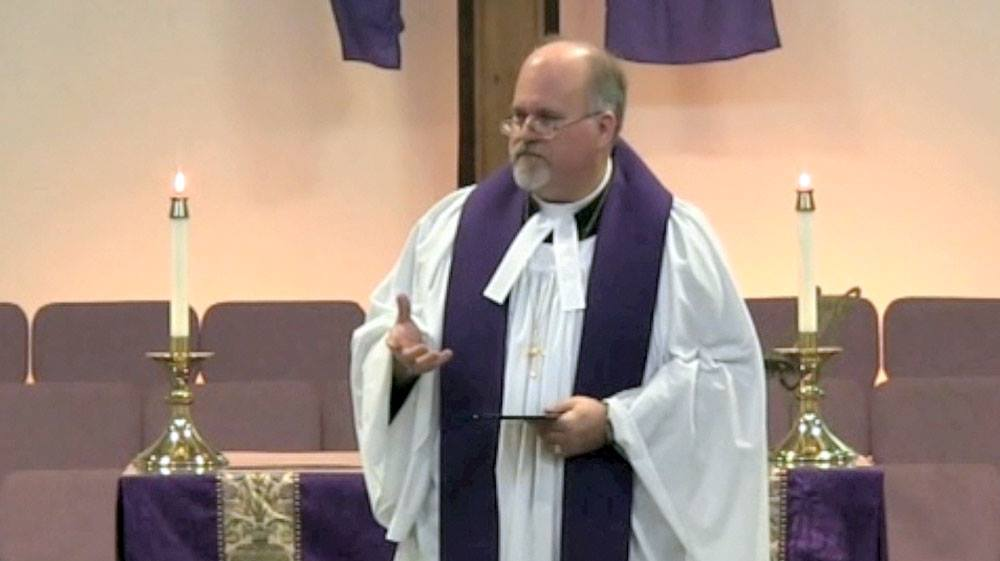
A Methodist minister delivering the sermon during a service of worship

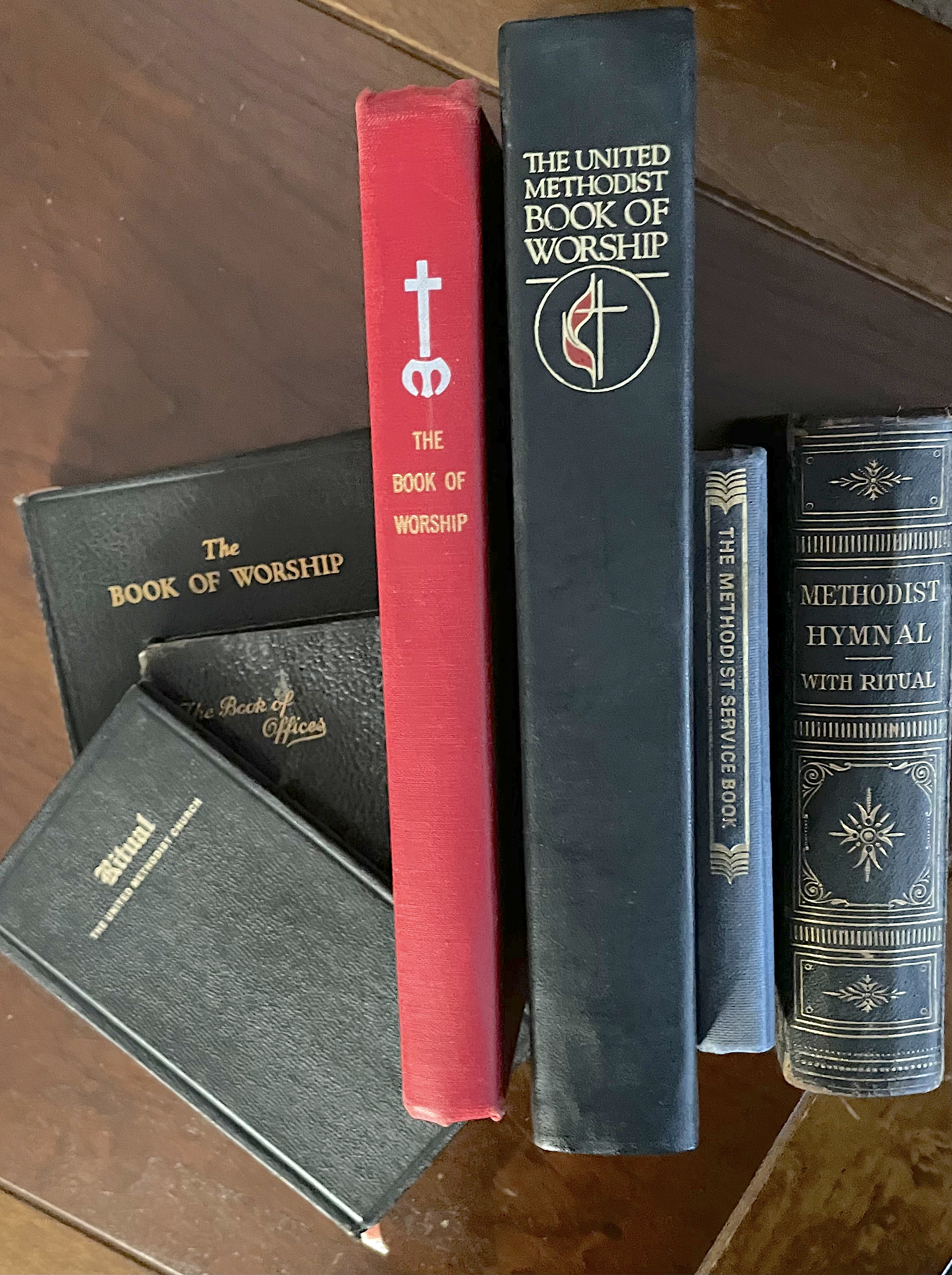
Several liturgical books from multiple Methodist denominations

The United Methodist liturgical tradition is based on The Sunday Service of the Methodists, which was passed along to Methodists by John Wesley (an Anglican priest who led the early Methodist revival) who wrote that

there is no Liturgy in the world, either in ancient or modern language, which breathes more of a solid, scriptural, rational piety, than the Common Prayer of the Church of England.

When the Methodists in America were separated from the Church of England, John Wesley himself provided a revised version of the Book of Common Prayer called The Sunday Service of the Methodists. Wesley's Sunday Service has shaped the official liturgies of the Methodists ever since. Worship, hymnology, devotional and liturgical practices in Methodism were also influenced by Lutheran Pietism and, in turn, Methodist worship became influential in the Holiness movement.

The United Methodist Church (the largest Methodist denomination) has official liturgies for services of Holy Communion, baptism, weddings, funerals, ordination, anointing of the sick for healing, and daily office "praise and prayer" services. Along with these, there are also special services for holy days such as All Saints Day, Ash Wednesday, Maundy Thursday, Good Friday, and Easter Vigil. All of these liturgies and services are contained in The United Methodist Hymnal and The United Methodist Book of Worship (1992). In most cases, congregations also use other elements of liturgical worship, such as candles, vestments, paraments, banners, and liturgical art.

- Traditional Methodist use, also known as Wesleyan Liturgy, based on The Sunday Service of the Methodists
- Methodist use of 1965, the second liturgical use, based on Book of Worship for Church and Home (1965), was always considered optional and completely voluntary
- United Methodist use, based on The United Methodist Book of Worship

Because John Wesley advocated outdoor evangelism, revival services are a traditional worship practice of Methodism that are often held in local churches, as well as at outdoor camp meetings, brush arbor revivals, and at tent revivals.

=== Eastern Protestantism ===
==== Byzantine tradition (Eastern European) ====
- Liturgy of Saint John Chrysostom, used by eastern orthodox churches which accepted the reformation, such as the Evangelical Church of Romania, Evangelical Orthodox Church, and Ukrainian Lutheran Church

==== Antiochian tradition ====
- Liturgy of Saint James, West Syriac Rite, used by the Mar Thoma Syrian Church, St. Thomas Evangelical Church of India, and Assyrian Evangelical Church
- Revised Common Lectionary, used by the Believers Eastern Church

==== Alexandrian tradition ====
- Liturgy of St. Dioscorus, Ethiopic Rite, principally used by P'ent'ay congregations

=== Pentecostalism and nondenominational Christianity ===
==== Worship service ====
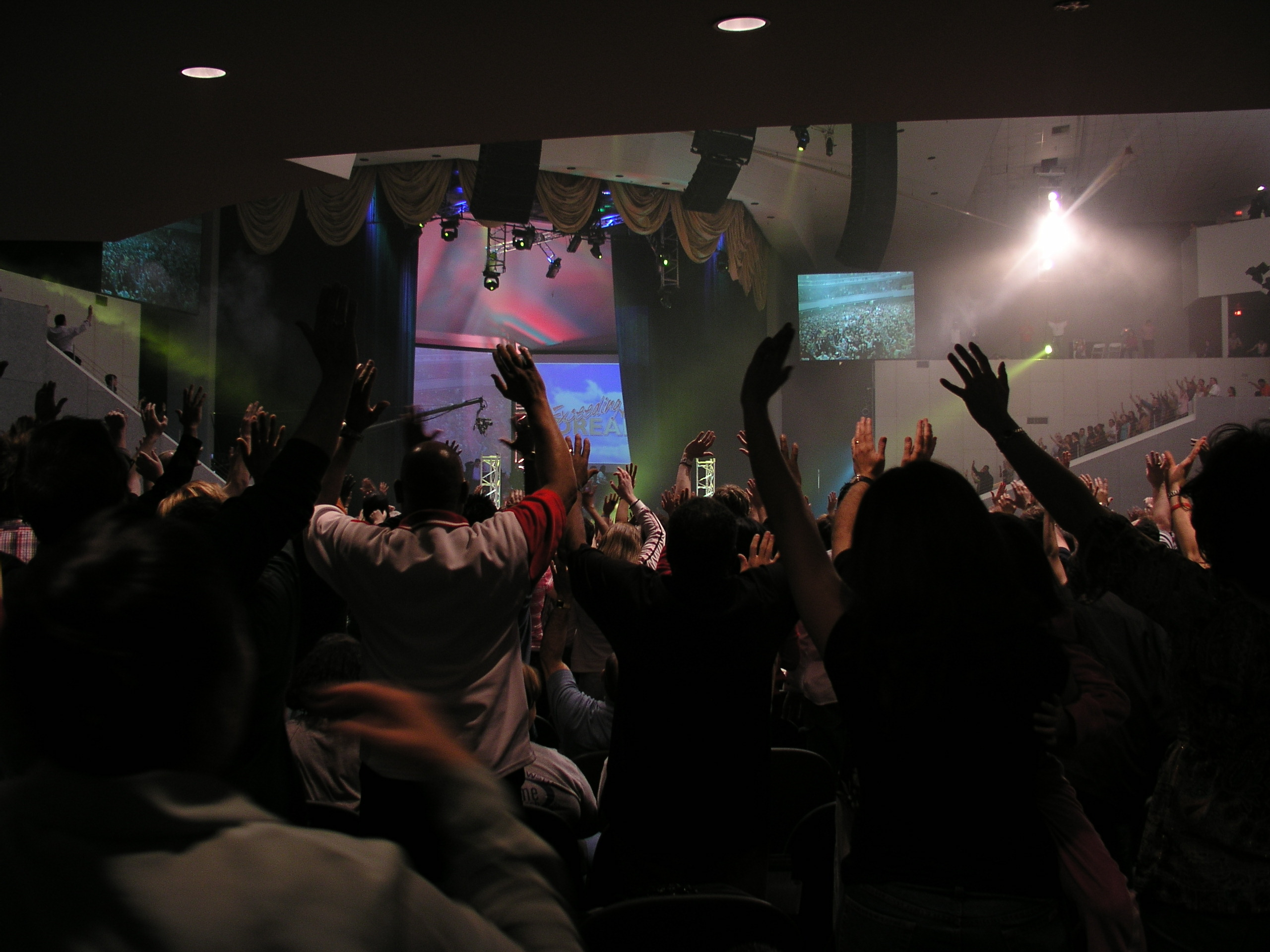
Worship service at Dream City Church, affiliated to the Assemblies of God USA, a Finished Work Pentecostal denomination, in Phoenix, United States

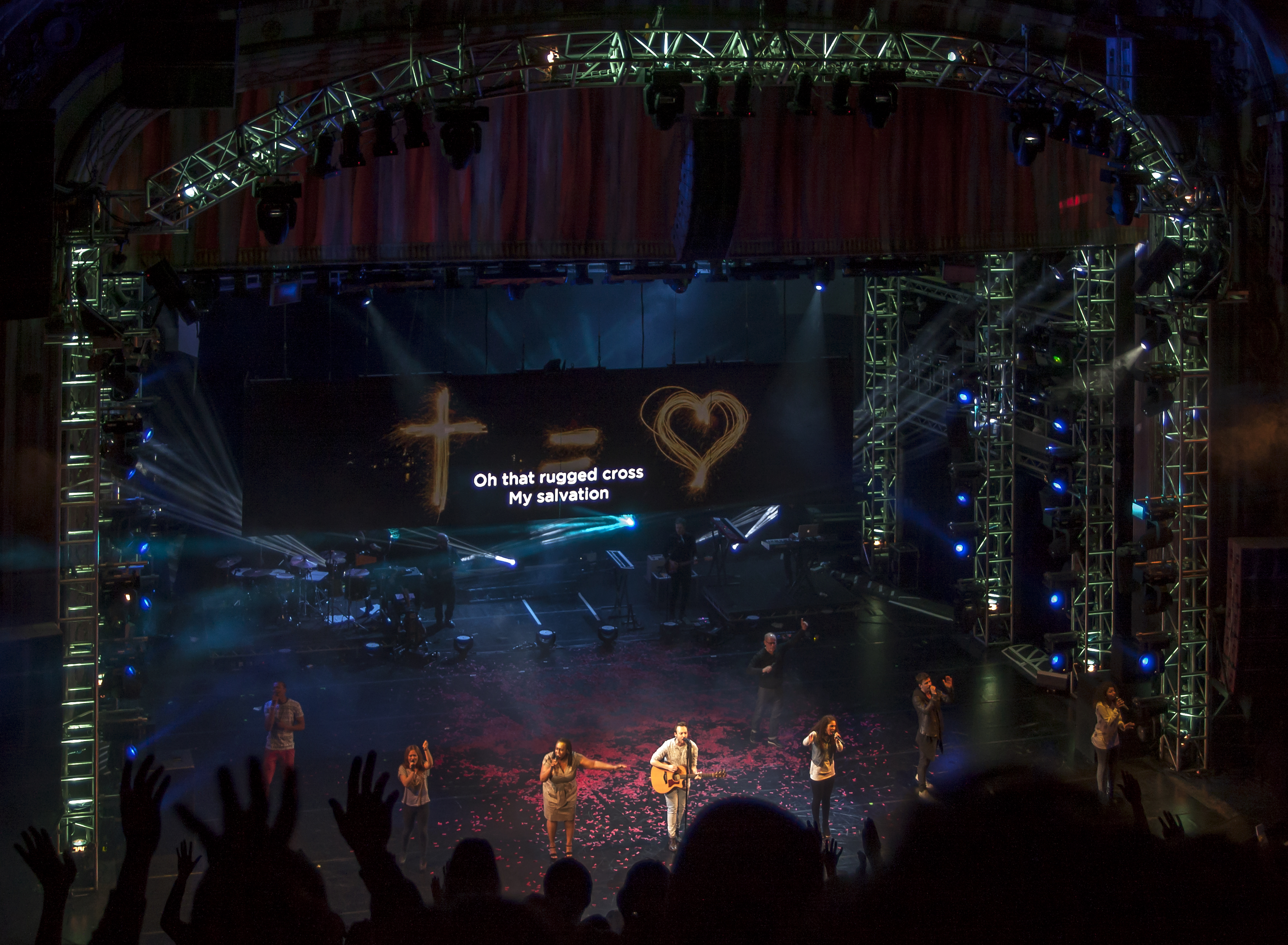
A Worship service at Hillsong Church UK, London

The worship service in neo-charismatic and Pentecostal churches is seen as facilitating "the believers' encounter with God." Certain churches in the Pentecostal tradition are more informal in their worship, while others, such as the Church of God, use a formal liturgy. It is usually run by a pastor and contains two main parts, the praise (Christian music) and the sermon, with periodically the Lord's Supper. During worship there is usually a nursery for babies. Children and young people receive an adapted education, Sunday school, often before the service of worship.

- Pentecostal and Charismatic services

While most Holiness Pentecostal churches use the Methodist rite, other Pentecostal movements, such as charismatic movement use a new conception of praise in worship, such as clapping and raising hands as a sign of worship, it also takes place in many non-charistmatic evangelical denominations.

- Contemporary service

In the 1980s and 1990s, contemporary Christian music, including a wide variety of musical styles, such as Christian rock and Christian hip hop, appeared in the praise.

== Bibliography ==
- Bürki, Bruno (2003). "Reformed Worship in Continental Europe in the Seventeenth Century". In Vischer, Lukas (ed.). Christian Worship in Reformed Churches Past and Present. Calvin Institute of Christian Worship Liturgical Studies. Cambridge: Wm. B. Eerdmans Publishing Company. ISBN 978-0802805201.
- White, James F. (1989). Protestant Worship. Louisville, KY: Westminster/John Knox Press. ISBN 978-0664250379.
