= Divine Service (Lutheran) =

Lutheran liturgy

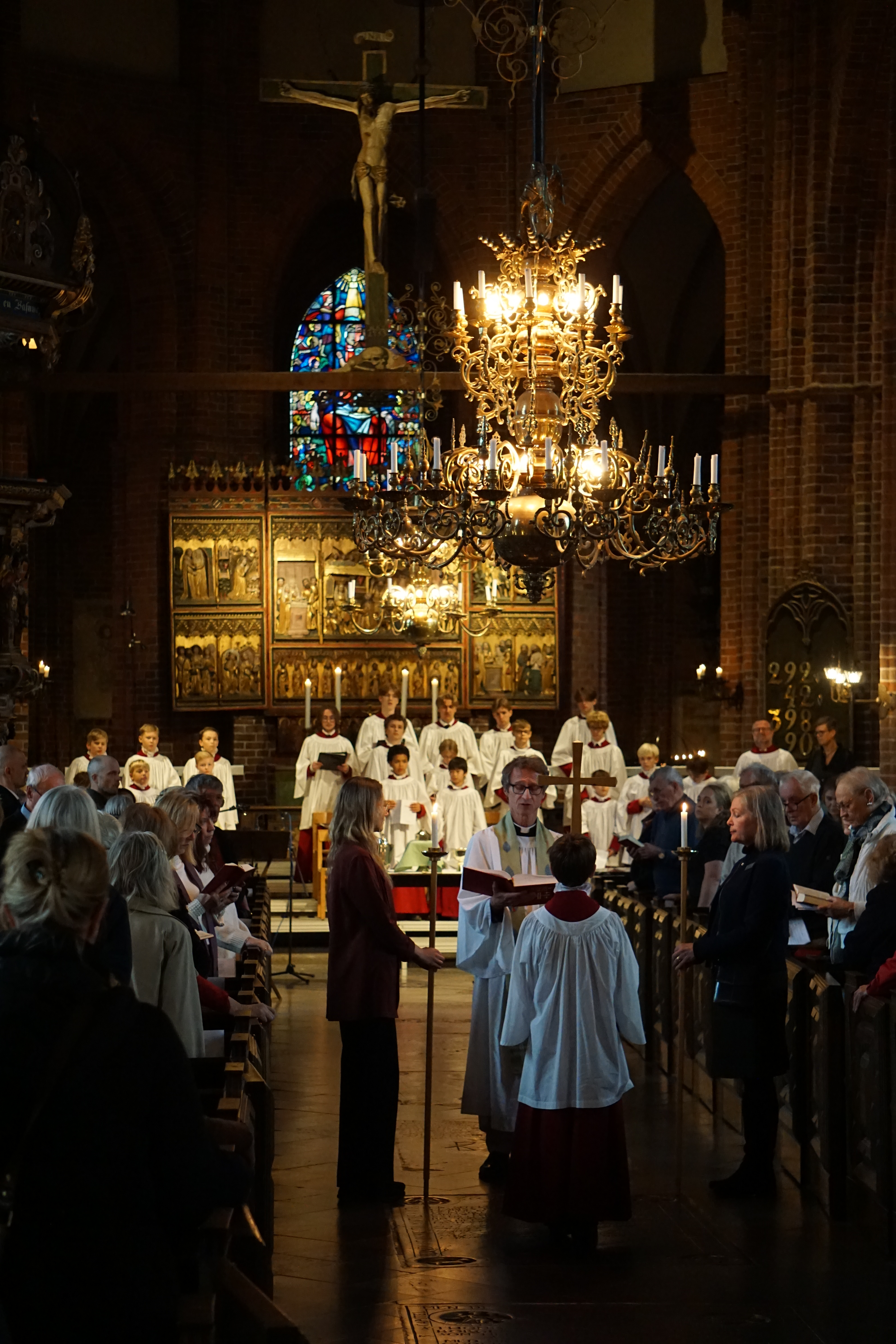
The reading of the Gospel during the offering of the Holy Mass at Saint Mary's Church in Helsingborg, Sweden

The Divine Service (German: Gottesdienst) is a title given to the Eucharistic liturgy as used in the various Lutheran churches. It has its roots in the Pre-Tridentine Mass as revised by Martin Luther in his Formula missae ("Form of the Mass") of 1523 and his Deutsche Messe ("German Mass") of 1526. It was further developed through the Kirchenordnungen ("church orders") of the sixteenth and seventeenth centuries that followed in the Lutheran tradition.

In the Nordic countries, where Lutheranism predominates, the usual term for the Eucharistic liturgy is Mass, even among Confessional Lutheran churches. In denominations heavily influenced by the twentieth century ecumenical and liturgical movements, such as the Evangelical Lutheran Church in America, the terms "Holy Communion" or "the Eucharist" are more frequently used.

Other Lutheran rites are also in use, such as those used in the Byzantine Rite Lutheran churches, such as the Ukrainian Lutheran Church and Evangelical Church of the Augsburg Confession in Slovenia. In these churches, the term "Divine Liturgy" is used.

== Definition and origins ==
In the parts of North American Lutheranism that use it, the term "Divine Service" supplants more usual English-speaking Lutheran names for the Mass: "The Service" or "The Holy Communion." The term is a calque of the German word Gottesdienst (literally "God-service" or "service of God"), the standard German word for worship.

As in the English phrase "service of God," the genitive in "Gottesdienst" is arguably ambiguous. It can be read as an objective genitive (service rendered to God) or a subjective genitive (God's "service" to people). While the objective genitive is etymologically more plausible, Lutheran writers frequently highlight the ambiguity and emphasize the subjective genitive. This is felt to reflect the belief, based on Lutheran doctrine regarding justification, that the main actor in the Divine Service is God himself and not man, and that in the most important aspect of evangelical worship God is the subject and we are the objects: that the Word and Sacrament are gifts that God gives to his people in their worship.

Although the term Mass was used by early Lutherans (the Augsburg Confession states that "we do not abolish the Mass but religiously keep and defend it") and Luther's two chief orders of worship are entitled "Formula Missae" and "Deutsche Messe"—such use has decreased in English usage except among Evangelical Catholics and High Church Lutherans though Mass is the normative term used in the Nordic countries. For example, in the Lutheran Church of Finland and Sweden the term Mass (”messu” in Finnish, "mässa" in Swedish) is used. Also, Lutherans have historically used the terms "Gottesdienst" or "The Service" to distinguish their Service from the worship of other Protestants, which has been viewed as focusing more on the faithful bringing praise and thanksgiving to God.

=== Nordic countries ===
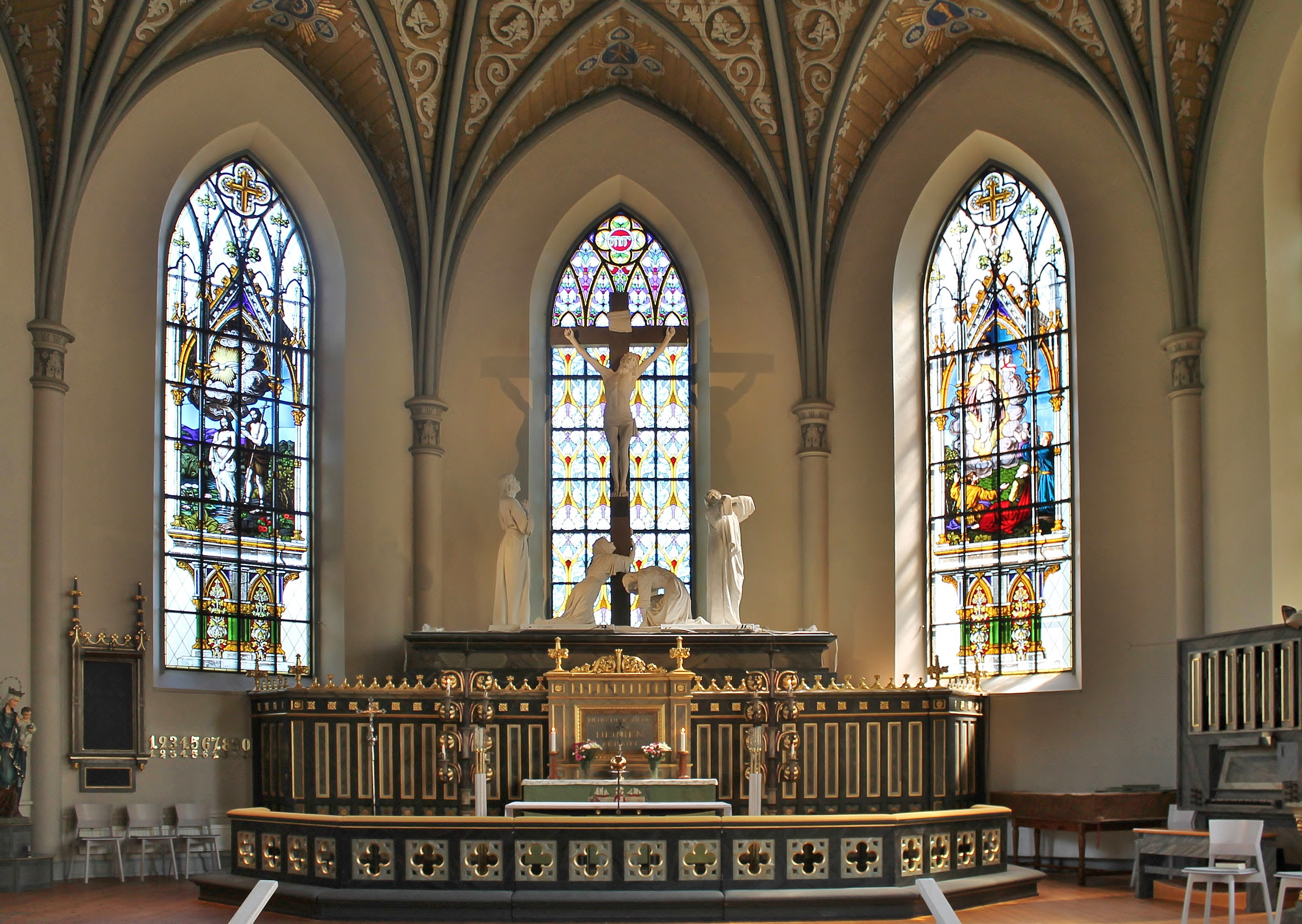
The high altar of Lutheran City Church of Oskarshamn, Sweden

The Order of the Mass produced under the liturgical reforms of the Lutheran divine Olavus Petri (6 January 1493 – 19 April 1552), expanded the anaphora from the Formula Missae, which liturgical scholar Frank Senn states fostered "a church life that was both catholic and evangelical, embracing the whole population of the country and maintaining continuity with pre-Reformation traditions, but centered in the Bible's gospel".

=== United States ===
The Lutheran liturgy currently used in the United States traces its development back to the work of Beale M. Schmucker, George Wenner, and Edward Horn. Their work took place in the context of a wider North American confessional revival. Between 1876 and 1883, various Lutheran synods expressed an interest in creating a common worship service. This led to the creation of a joint committee in 1884 that included representatives of the General Synod and General Council, the two dominant pan-Lutheran groups. This committee appointed Schmucker, Wenner, and Horn, who began their work in April 1884. A year later, they brought a draft to the General Synod's convention that modified and approved the following order: Introit, Kyrie, Gloria in Excelsis, Collect, Epistle, Gradual with Alleluia (or Tract during Lent), Gospel, Nicene Creed, Sermon, General Prayer, Preface, Sanctus and Benedictus qui Venit, Exhortation to Communicants, Lord's Prayer and Words of Institution, Agnus Dei, Distribution, Collect of Thanksgiving, Nunc Dimittis, Benedicamus Domino, Benediction. In 1887, the three men presented their final draft to the Joint Committee. This final draft used the King James Version language and Anglican (Book of Common Prayer) translations of the Kyrie, Gloria, Creeds, Prefaces, Lord's Prayer, and Collects. It also included the Nunc Dimittis as an option. The final draft, with minor edits, was approved by the various synods in 1888 and has become known as The Common Service and formed the basis for every major Lutheran hymnal and worship book into the late twentieth century.

=== Brazil ===
In Brazil both the Evangelical Church of the Lutheran Confession in Brazil (IECLB) and the Evangelical Lutheran Church of Brazil (IELB) use the term culto for the Divine Service, in line with the broader terminology used by other Protestant churches in the country, while preserving the historic Lutheran liturgy.

== Liturgy ==
=== Preparatory Service ===
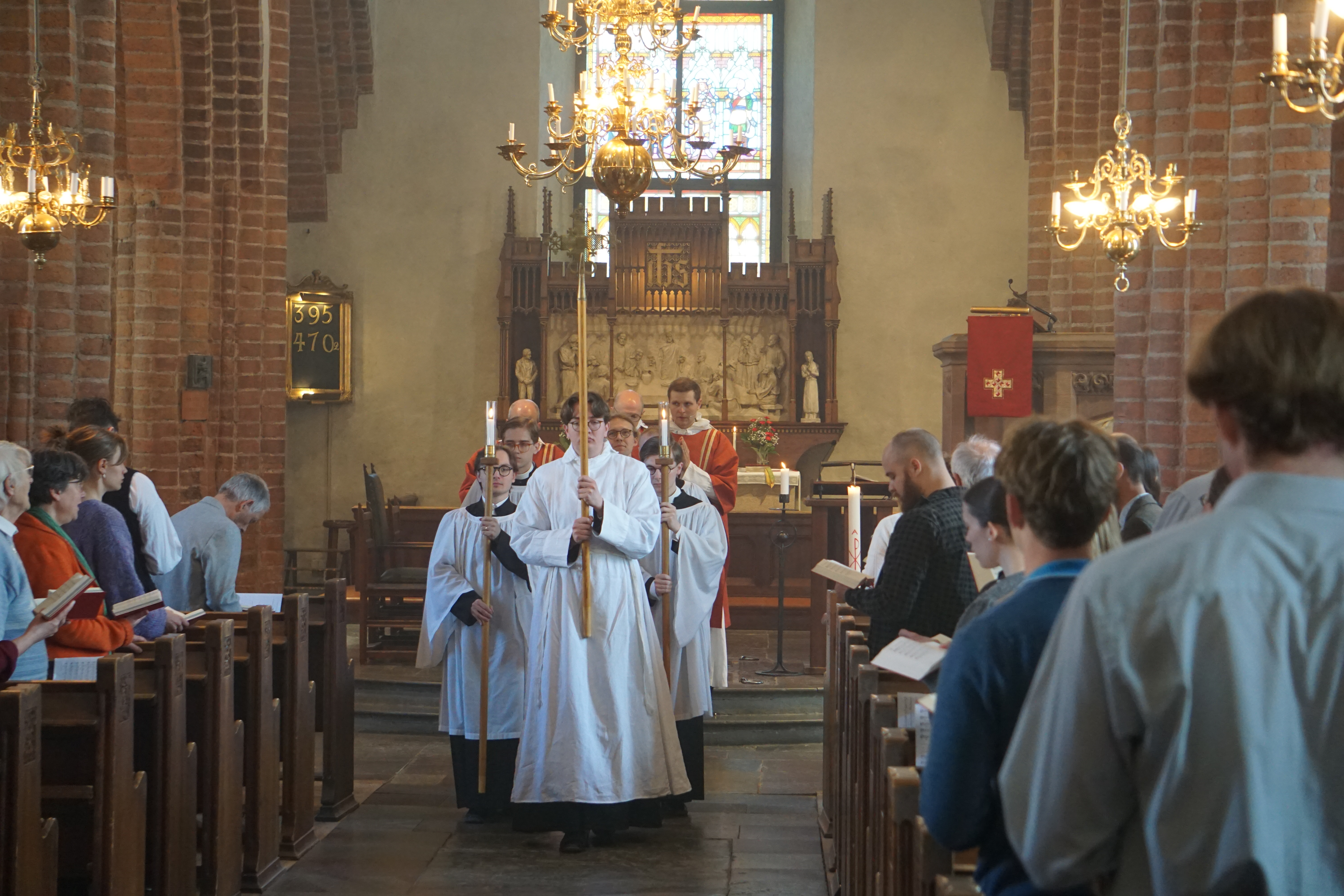
Evangelical-Lutheran acolytes (with the crossbearer in the center) prepare for the Gospel Reading during High Mass at Holy Trinity Church in Uppsala on the Feast Day of the Apostles Philip and James the Less

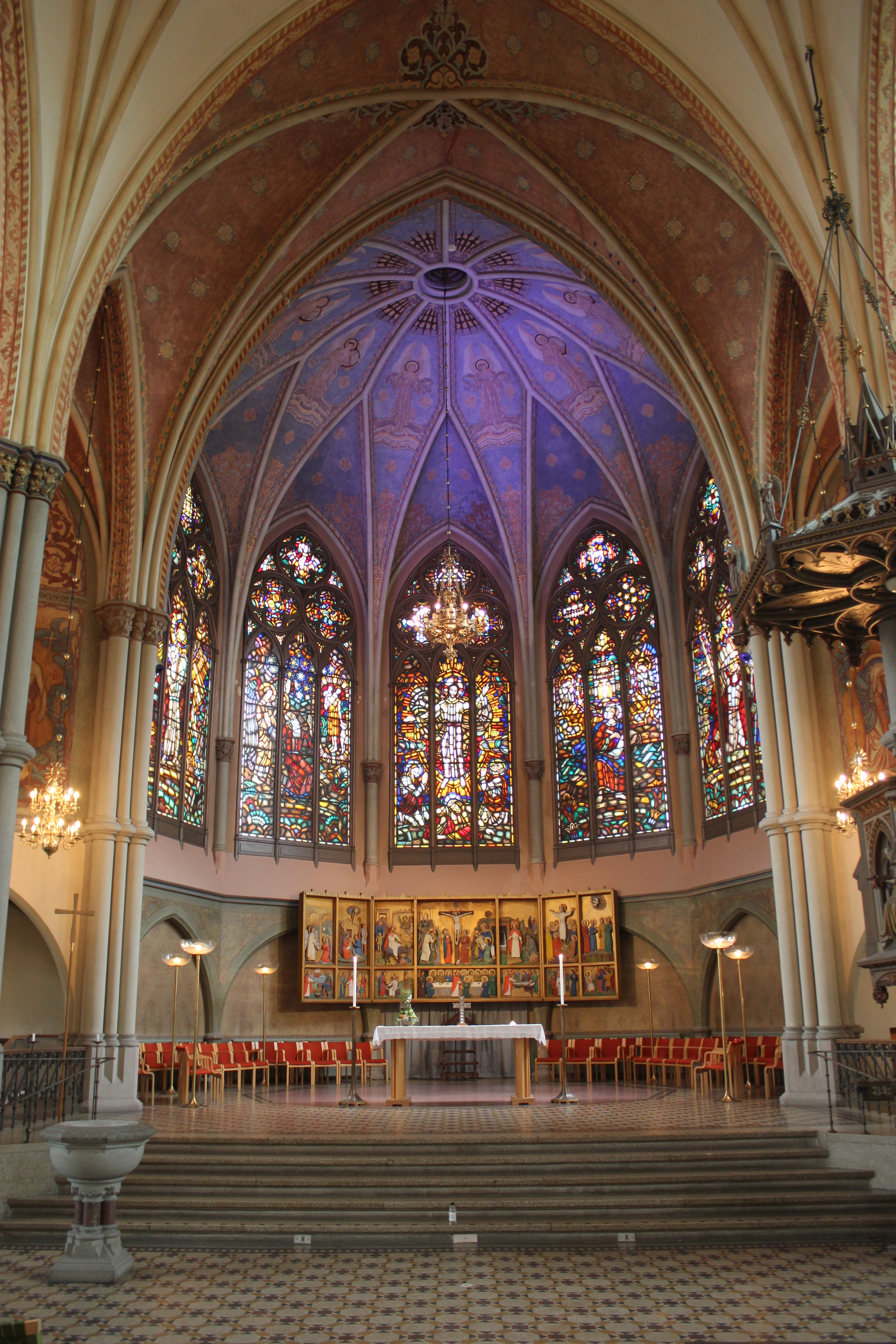
The high altar of Oscar Fredrik Lutheran Church in Gothenburg, Sweden

- Processional hymn is sung.
  - The people stand. During this hymn, the pastor and those assisting him/her (such as the acolytes) process into the sanctuary from the narthex.
- The Invocation begins the Divine Service.
  - For the Invocation and the Preparatory Service, the pastor is to stand at the foot of the altar steps, advancing to the altar at the Introit. He speaks the Trinitarian formula, as the Sign of the Cross is made by all.
- The Confession follows
  - "In the Confession (Lat. "Confiteor"), we kneel humbly before our God, acknowledging our sin and seeking purification of our Spirit. In the Declaration of Grace that follows, we receive from God Himself the assurance of God's mercy and grace that enables us to focus on our loving God." Both the congregation and the pastor kneel as the following is said:

Pastor: If we say we have no sin, we deceive ourselves, and the truth is not in us.

Congregation: But if we confess our sins, God who is faithful and just will forgive our sins and cleanse us from all unrighteousness.

(moment of silence for personal examination)

Pastor: Let us then confess our sins to God our Father.

All: Most merciful God, we confess that we are by nature sinful and unclean. We have sinned against you in thought, word, and deed, by what we have done and by what we have left undone. We have not loved You with our whole heart; we have not loved our neighbors as ourselves. We justly deserve Your present and eternal punishment. For the sake of Your Son, Jesus Christ, have mercy on us. Forgive us, renew us, and lead us, so that we may delight in Your will and walk in Your ways to the glory of your Holy Name. Amen.

Pastor: Almighty God in His mercy has given His Son to die for you and for His sake forgives you all your sins. As a called and ordained servant of Christ, and by His authority, I therefore forgive you all your sins in the name of the Father and of the Son and of the Holy Spirit. .

All: Amen.

=== Service of the Word ===
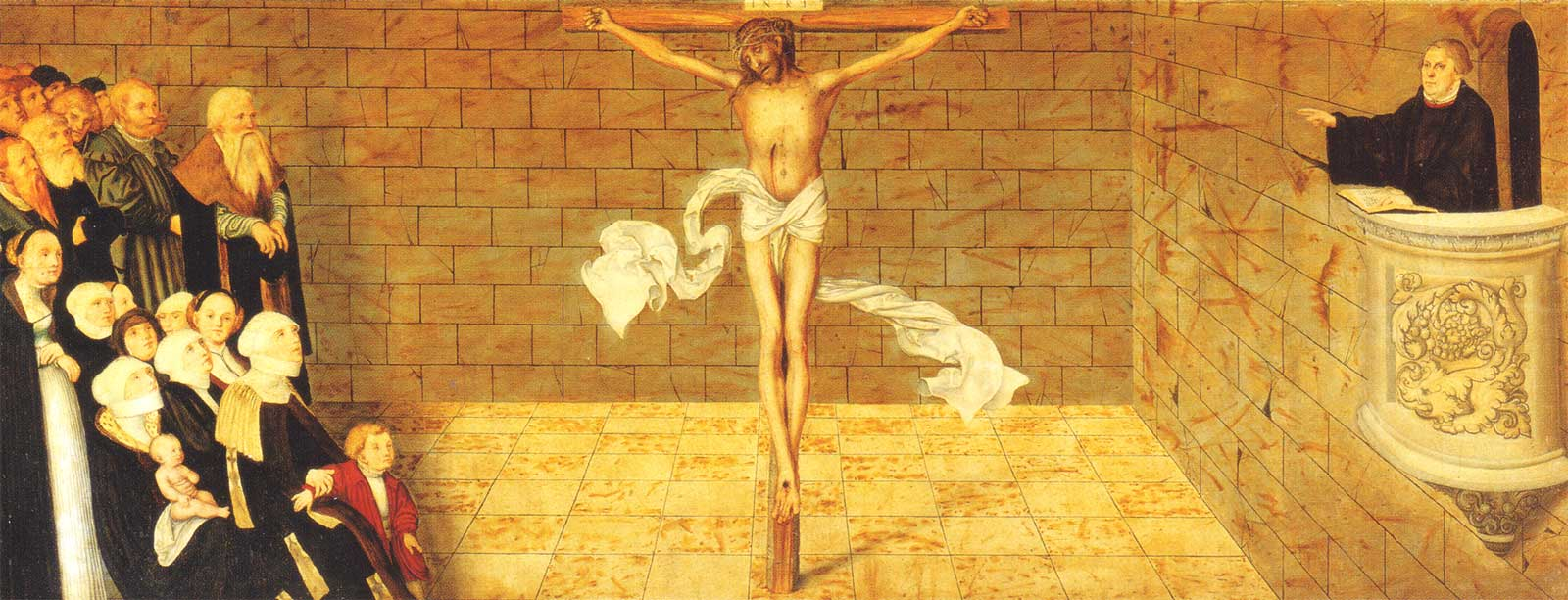
Martin Luther celebrating the Divine Service (predella of the 1547 altar by Lucas Cranach the Elder and Younger in St. Mary's Church, Wittenberg, Germany)

- The Introit is sung.
  - "The Introit (Lat. "entrance") marks the actual beginning of the Service of the Day. It strikes the keynote theme of the entire Service, recognizing the glory of God and announcing God's grace using pertinent verses, usually from the Psalms. The Introit consists of an Antiphon, followed by a Psalm verse, followed by the Gloria Patri. The Antiphon is then repeated for emphasis." It is during the Introit that the choir, ministers (bishop, pastors (presbyters), deacons), and celebrant process to the chancel. Bowing to the altar, they move to their seats. The celebrant approaches the altar and bow to kiss it. All remain standing.
- The Kyrie is chanted by a deacon.
  - "In the Kýrie Eléison (Gr. "O Lord, have mercy"), we pray to God for grace and help in time of need. It expresses our humility and appreciation of our own weakness and need in a sinful world."
- The Gloria in Excelsis Deo follows.
  - "The Gloria in Excelsis (Lat. "Glory to God in the highest") is the angelic hymn announcing the birth of our Savior Jesus Christ to the shepherds. In it, we join in the hymn of the angels in celebration of the Father's gift of His Son." During Advent and Lent the Gloria in Excelsis is omitted. In its place in Advent, "O come, O come, Emmanuel" is commonly sung. In Lent, "Vexilla Regis" commonly takes its place.
- Next is the Dominus Vobiscum and the day's Collect.
  - "The Dominus Vobiscum is a reciprocal chanted prayer of the Pastor for his people and of the congregation for its Pastor before we together offer our petitions to God. It reflects the special relationship of love between the Pastor and congregation... The Collect sums up, or "collects", all the prayers of the church into one short prayer and suggests the theme of the day or season." After the collect, all may be seated.
- The first reading (commonly an Old Testament passage) is read.
  - During Easter and its season a passage from the book of Acts of the Apostles is read. After the reading the person chants "The Word of the Lord", to which the congregation replies "Thanks be to God". Today the common practice is that the readings (excluding the Gospel) are read by lay people.
- Next, the Gradual is sung by the cantor and/or choir.
  - "The Gradual, so-named because it was originally sung from a step (Lat. "gradus") of the altar, provides a musical echo to the passage just read and a transition to the next lesson." The gradual is psalm that is sung in meditation on the first reading.
- The Epistle reading is announced and read.
  - "The Epistle (Gr. "letter") is usually taken from the letters of the Apostles. Frequently, this lesson does not relate directly to the Gospel. Usually, it bears practical and serious thoughts for daily living."
- The Alleluia and verse is now sung by cantor and people.
  - "The Alleluia (Heb. "Praise the Lord") is a song of joy at the hearing of the Word of God. The accompanying verse usually reflects the mood of the day." During Lent, the Alleluia is omitted and is replaced with a tract. All rise at the singing of the Alleluia and remain standing while the Gospel is read.
- The Gospel reading is chanted or spoken. Traditionally the role of a deacon.
  - "At the announcement of the Gospel, we sing the Gloria Tibi, Domine (Lat. "Glory to you, O Lord"), joyfully affirming our recognition of the real presence of Christ. After hearing our Savior's Good News, we respond with words of praise in the Laus Tibi, Christe (Lat. "Praise to you, O Christ")."
- The Hymn of the day is sung next.
  - This hymn outlines the theme of the day and is the chief hymn of the Divine Service, so it is chosen very carefully. Following, the people may be seated.
- Sermon (also called "homily" or "postil").
  - "In the Sermon, the preacher "rightly divides (or interprets) the Word of truth." The Sermon contains elements of the two great doctrines of the Bible: the Law, which tells us how we are to live, and the Gospel, which proclaims forgiveness of our sins, by grace, through faith, for Christ's sake. The Gospel predominates in the Sermon. The Sermon usually relates to the lessons of the day." After the sermon the people stand and the pastor says the Votum (Lat. "we desire"): "The peace of God, which surpasses all understanding, keep your hearts and minds through Christ Jesus."
- The Nicene Creed is spoken.
  - "The Creed (Lat. "I believe") is our individual, public confession of faith, spoken with the "one, holy, catholic and apostolic Church". It is a statement of Christianity's most basic and fundamental beliefs, witnessing to the unity and universality of the Church. It does not specifically mean "The Roman Catholic Church"
- The Collection and Offertory follow.
  - After the offerings have been collected they are given to the pastor, who presents it at the altar. "We joyfully offer to God a portion of His gifts to us, as an outward response of our faith in Him." After the collection, the Offertory is sung. "In the words of David, we ask God to cleanse our hearts, to keep us in the one true faith and to grant us the full joy of salvation."
- The Prayer of the Faithful is next, with petitions offered by a deacon.
  - "In the Prayer of the Faithful, the Church performs its priestly role (which is communal and not individual) by representing the people of the world before God in prayer. The "Prayer of the Church" is therefore not the prayer of individuals for themselves nor the congregation for itself but is indeed the prayer of the Church for the world, the work of the Church, and the Church itself."

=== Service of the Sacrament ===
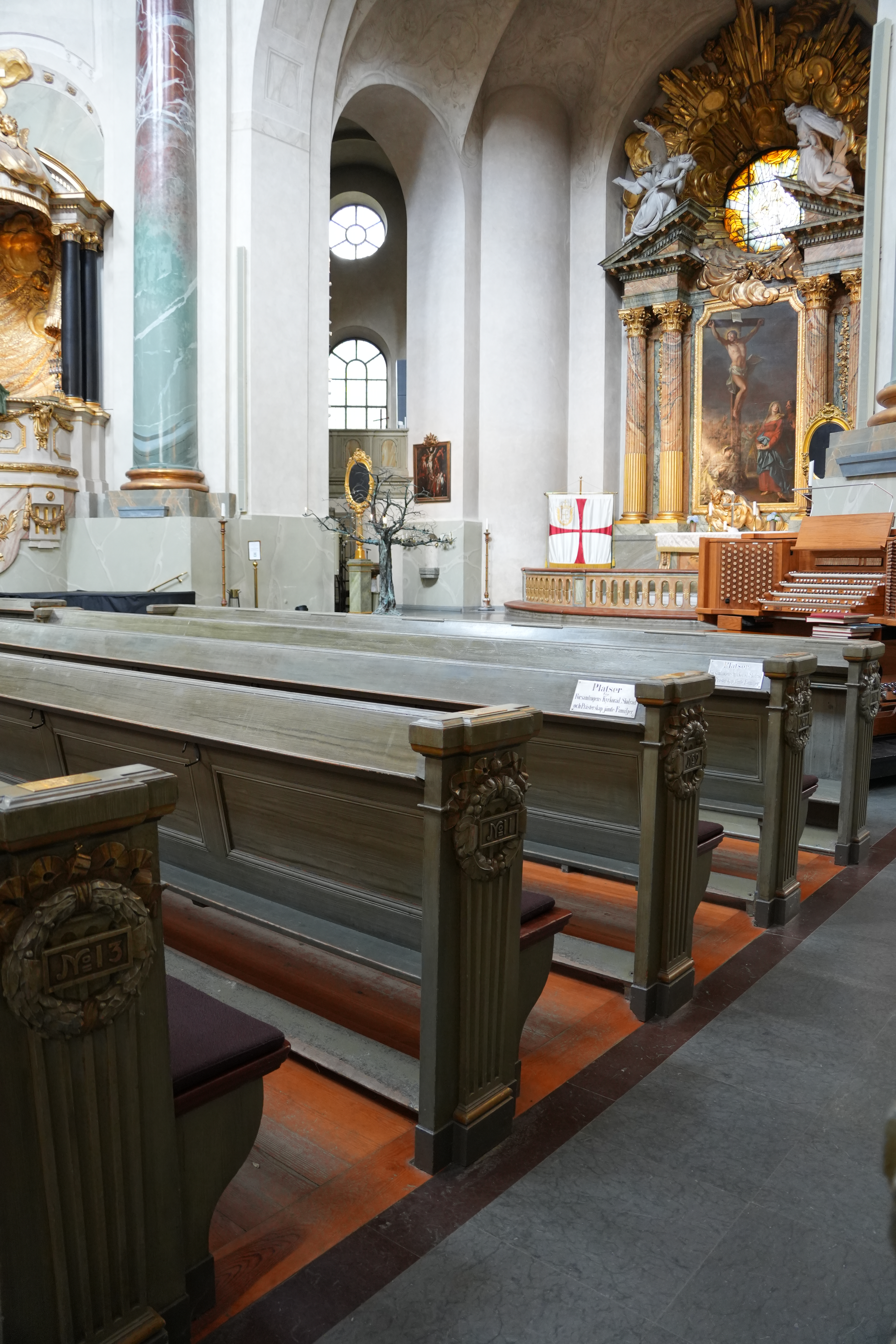
During the offering of the Mass, it is common for Evangelical-Lutherans to kneel after the Sanctus and the Agnus Dei; as such, a number of the pews of Evangelical-Lutheran churches have kneelers (depicted is Hedvig Eleonora Church in Östermalm, Sweden).

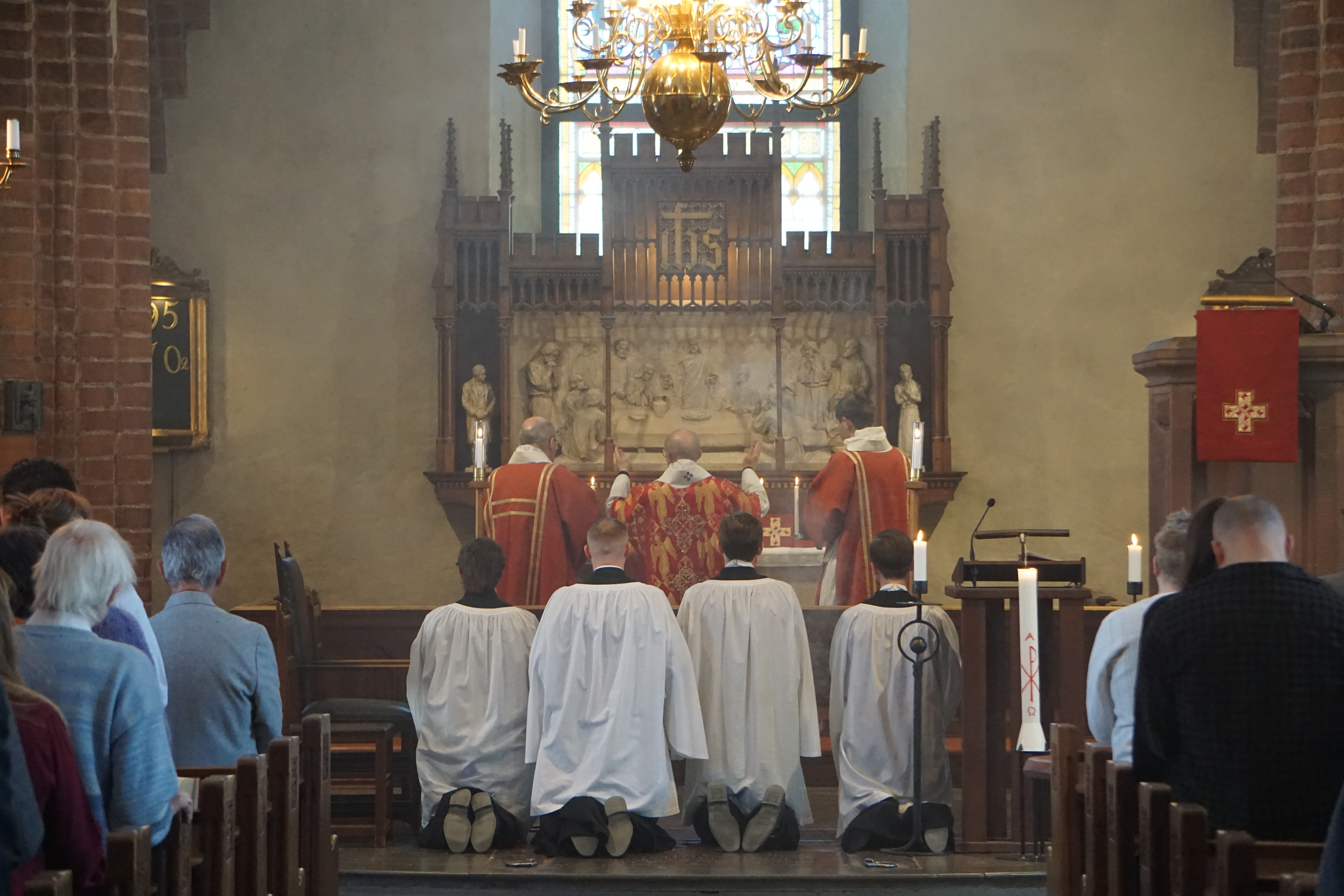
The consecration during High Mass at Holy Trinity Church in Uppsala on the Feast Day of the Apostles Philip and James the Less

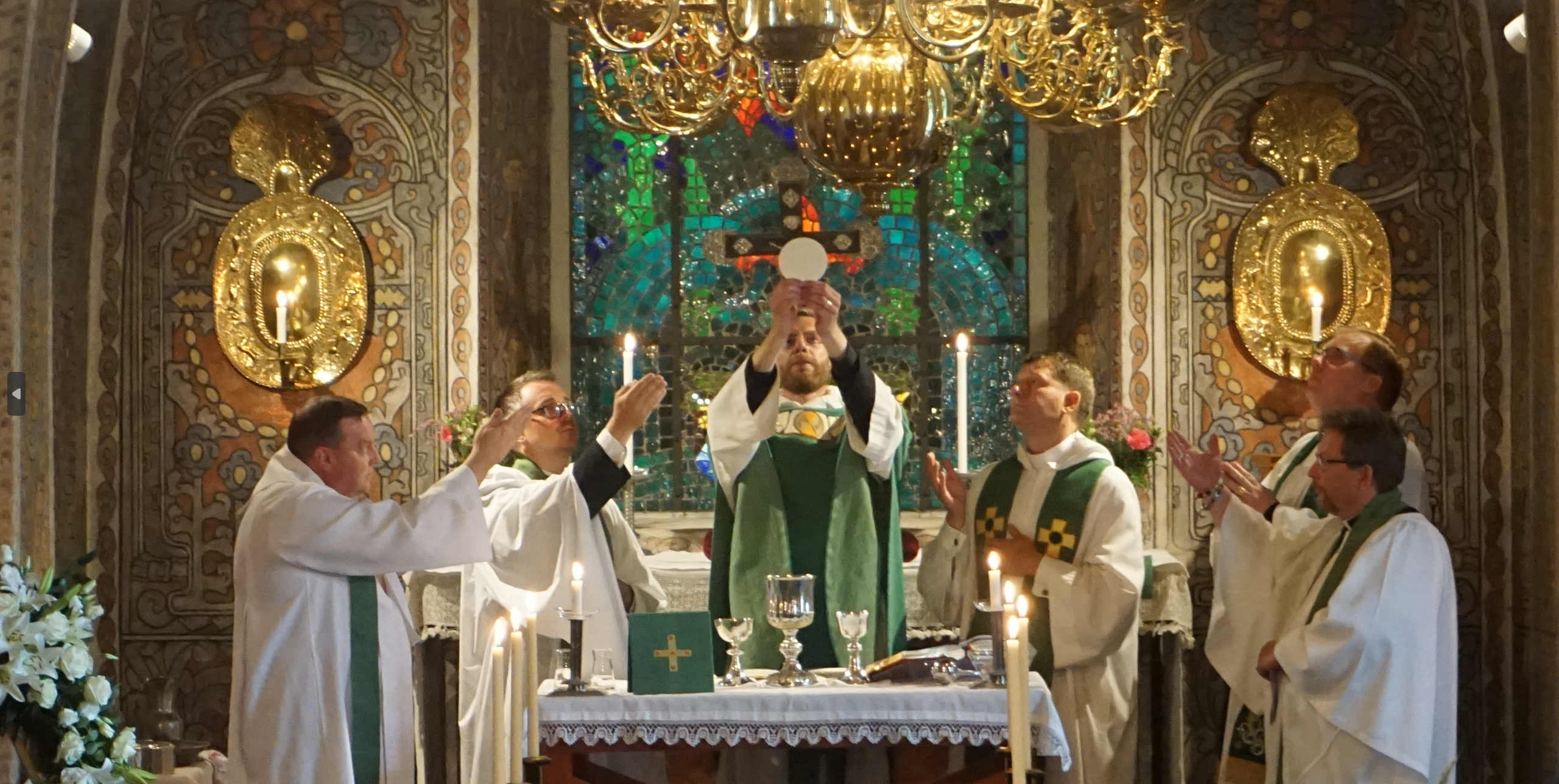
Lutheran priest elevating the host during the Mass at Alsike Church, Sweden

- The Preface is chanted.
  - "The Preface begins the Office of Holy Communion. It begins with a simple but powerful dialogue between the pastor and the congregation, which unites the whole body of believers in reverence, adoration, joy and thanksgiving in anticipation of the Sacrament. This is followed by the Common Preface, which begins "It is truly good, right and salutary" and ends with "Therefore with angels and archangels," thus uniting the Church with angelic host. In between is the Proper Preface, which is variable."
- The Sanctus and Benedictus are sung.
  - "In the Sanctus (Lat. "Holy"), we join with the "Angels, Archangels and all the company of heaven" in proclaiming the glory of the Father (first sentence), praising Christ our Savior (second sentence) and singing the song of the children of Jerusalem as they welcomed the Messiah on the first Palm Sunday (third sentence)."
- The Anaphora follows.
  - "The reverent, unadorned use of the Anaphora focuses all our thoughts on the acts and words or Christ and expresses the Real Presence of Christ's body and blood in, with and under the bread and wine. Here, God is dealing with us in a loving manner, reminding us that Christ died for our sins." Below is an example form:

Pastor: You are indeed holy, almighty and merciful God; you are most holy, and great is the majesty of your glory. You so loved the world that you gave your only Son, that whoever believes in him may not perish but have eternal life. Having come into the world, he fulfilled for us your holy will and accomplished our salvation. Our Lord Jesus Christ, on the night when He was betrayed, took bread, and when he had given thanks, he broke it and gave it to his disciples and said, 'Take; eat; this is my body, given for you. This do in remembrance of me.' In the same way, also, He took the cup after supper, and when He had given thanks, He gave it to them saying, 'Drink of it all of you. This cup is the New Testament in My Blood, shed for you for the forgiveness of sins. This do as often as you drink it, in remembrance of Me.'

Remembering, therefore, his salutary command, his life-giving Passion and death, his glorious resurrection and ascension, and his promise to come again, we give thanks to you, Lord God Almighty, not as we ought, but as we are able; and we implore you mercifully to accept our praise and thanksgiving, and, with your Word and Holy Spirit, to bless us, your servants, and these your own gifts of bread and wine; that we and all who share in the + body and blood of your Son may be filled with heavenly peace and joy, and receiving the forgiveness of sin, may be + sanctified in soul and body, and have our portion with all your saints.

People: Amen.

Pastor: As often as we eat this bread and drink this cup, we proclaim the Lord's death until He comes.

People: Amen. Come, Lord Jesus.

Pastor: O Lord Jesus Christ, only Son of the Father, in giving us Your body and blood to eat and to drink, You lead us to remember and confess Your holy cross and passion, Your blessed death, Your rest in the tomb, Your resurrection from the dead, Your ascension into heaven, and Your coming for the final judgment.

- Many Lutheran churches forego the use of a eucharistic prayer which encircle Jesus' words of institution and instead progress from the Sanctus to the Words of Institution to the Lord's Prayer to the Agnus Dei and on to the distribution. Widely respected Lutheran liturgical scholar and theologian Oliver K. Olson wrote; "The danger of the eucharistic prayer is not primarily its text, but its direction." and "Including human words in the consecration means enclosing the words of institution (like a sandwich) within a human prayer. Making the words of institution into part of a prayer results in a change of direction. That means that the liturgy is initiated by humans and directed toward God." The danger of this mistaken direction of the action at this point of the service is that Lutherans are unanimous in the belief that the Lord's Supper is solely God's service to us and the use of the eucharistic prayer may lead to an unintended teaching of it being a human action toward God that results in its efficacy rather than it being merely our Holy Spirit given faith that clings to Christ's promised, "for you".
- The Lord's Prayer follows.
  - "As children, we address our God as "Our Father", praying as our Lord Jesus Christ himself taught us to pray."
- Next is the Pax Domini.
  - "The Pax Domini (Lat. "Peace of the Lord") is the same greeting spoken by the risen Christ to His disciples on Easter evening. It is the final blessing before we approach the altar to receive the gift of Christ's body and blood."
- The Agnus Dei follows.
  - "The Agnus Dei (Lat. "Lamb of God") is our hymn of adoration to our Savior Jesus Christ who is truly present for us in the Sacrament. The Agnus Dei recalls the testimony of John the Baptist when he pointed to Jesus and proclaimed: "Behold the Lamb of God who takes away the sin of the world.""
- The Distribution is next.

The faithful receive the Eucharist kneeling on the chancel rail during the offering of the Mass at Vadstena Abbey Church (Evangelical-Lutheran) in Sweden

  - The congregation is to remain kneeling in adoration during the distribution. The pastor first receives communion and then "those who will be assisting him". "By Christ's own words, "Given and shed for you for the remission of sins", in the Sacrament of the Lord's Supper God offers, gives, and seals for us forgiveness of sins, life and salvation." The manner of receiving the Eucharist differs throughout the world. Sometimes there is a cushioned area at the front of the church where the congregation can come to the front to kneel and receive this sacrament. Typically, the pastor distributes the host and an assistant (the deacon) then distributes the wine. The congregation departs and may make the sign of the cross. In other Lutheran churches, the process is much like the Post-Vatican II form used in the Catholic Church, the eucharistic minister (most commonly the pastor) and his assistants/deacons line up, with the eucharistic minister in the center, holding the hosts, and the two assistants on either side, holding the chalices. The people process to the front in lines and receive the Eucharist kneeling [though standing is the practice in a number of Evangelical-Lutheran parishes]; when a person receives the bread, the eucharistic minister may say "The Body of Christ, given for you." When a person receives the wine, the assistant/deacon may say "The Blood of Christ, shed for you." Following this, the people make the sign of the cross (if they choose to) and return to their places in the congregation.

In dismissing the communicants, the pastor commonly says, "The body and blood of our Lord strengthen and preserve you steadfast in the true faith to life everlasting." The communicants may say "Amen". Silent prayer is appropriate after being dismissed. "The Dismissal reassures communicants of the efficacy of the Lord's Supper in creating life-saving faith in Christ."

- The nunc dimittis is sung next as a postcommunion canticle
  - "In singing the Nunc Dimittis, (Lat. "Now you dismiss"), we stand with Simeon as he looked upon the baby Jesus, in awe of the profound mystery that the Father would give His only Son in the flesh for the salvation of our souls. Having just received the Lord's Supper, we have truly seen Thy Salvation, which [God] prepared before the face of all people."
- The postcommunion collect follows.
  - "The Versicle calls us to give thanks and introduces the Thanksgiving Collect. In the Collect, we thank God for His life-saving Sacrament and pray that His gift of faith offered therein causes us to change our life and enables us to love God and love others."

The Benedicamus Domino is sung:

Celebrant: "Let us bless the Lord."

People: Thanks be to God.

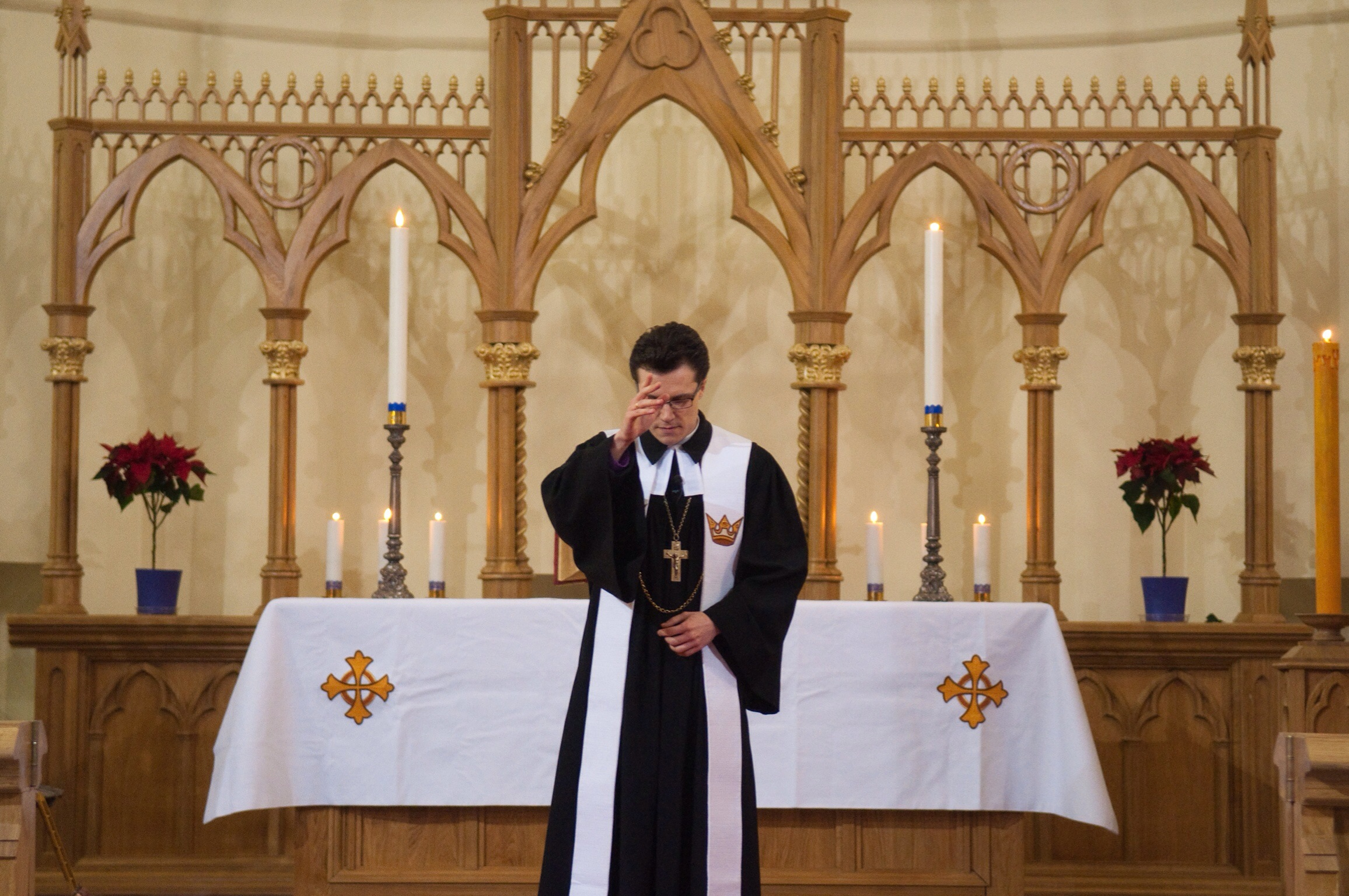
An Evangelical Lutheran priest in Russia imparts the Final Blessing with the sign of the cross during the concluding rites of the Mass

- The Benediction (from Numbers 6:24) and the Amen is chanted.
  - "More than a prayer for blessing, the Benediction imparts a blessing in God's name, giving positive assurance of the grace and peace of God to all who receive it in faith. The words of the Benediction are those that the God gave to Moses (the Aaronic Blessing) and those used by Christ at the Ascension. The final word that falls on our ears from our gracious God is "peace", affirming our reconciliation to God through the blood of Jesus Christ... We conclude the Divine Service with a triple Amen, that is, "Yea, yea, it shall be so", which expresses our firm faith in the forgiveness of sins by God's grace through Jesus Christ as heard and experienced in the Word and Sacrament of the Divine Service just ended."
- The recessional hymn is sung.
  - The pastor and his assistants process into the narthex.
- The ite missa est concludes the Divine Service.
  - Before the congregation departs, the deacon walks back into the sanctuary and says, "Go in peace to love and serve the Lord" (or similar words) as the people respond, "Thanks be to God."

== Eastern Rite Lutheran liturgies ==
The predominant rite used by the Lutheran churches is a Western one based on the Formula Missae ("Form of the Mass") although other Lutheran liturgies are also in use, such as those used in the Byzantine Rite Lutheran Churches, such as the Ukrainian Lutheran Church and Evangelical Church of the Augsburg Confession in Slovenia.

== Gallery ==
The consecration during the Evangelical-Lutheran Mass at Vadstena Abbey Church, Sweden

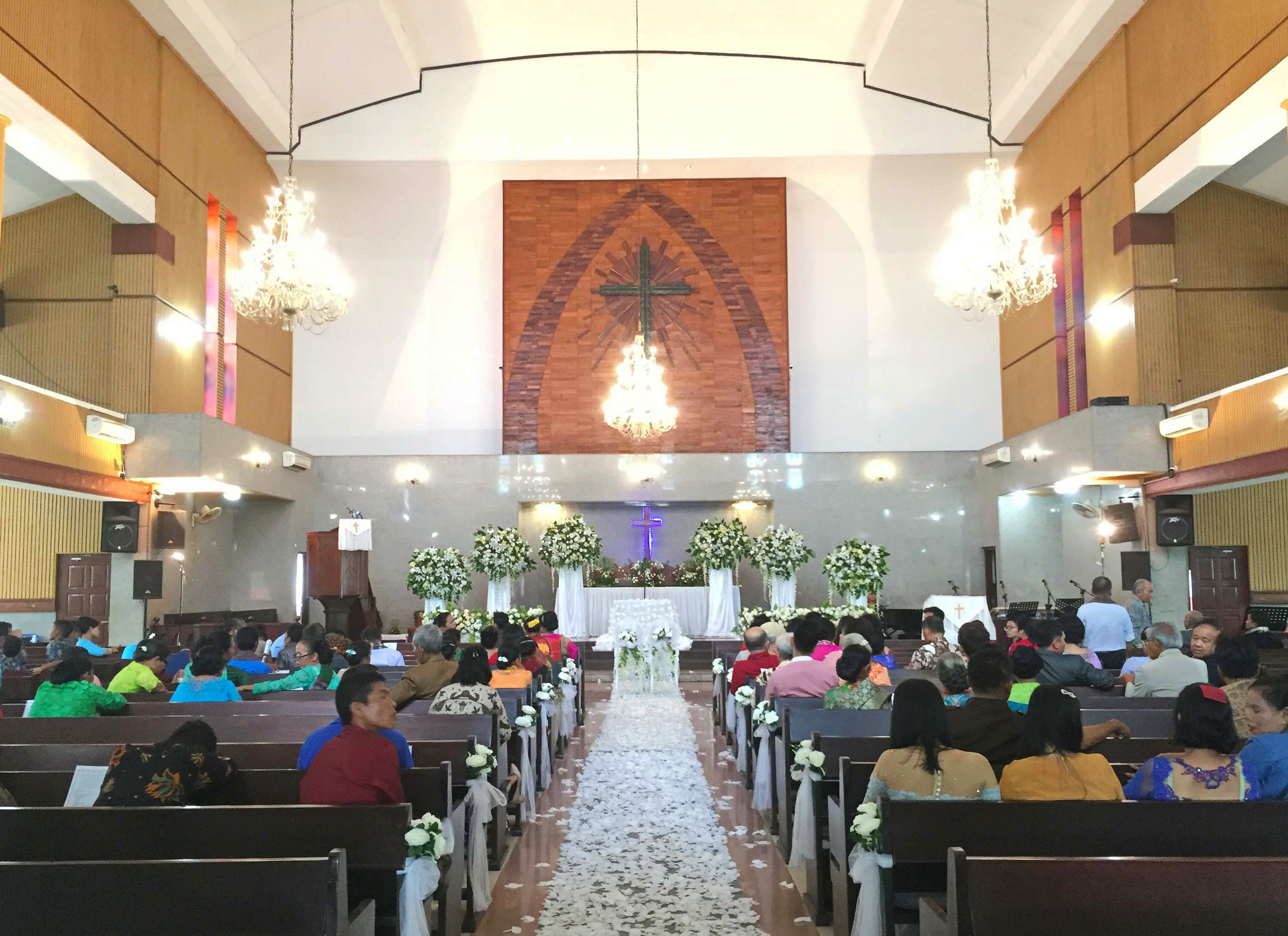
HKBP congregation sitting before the start of the Divine Service in Medan, North Sumatra, Indonesia

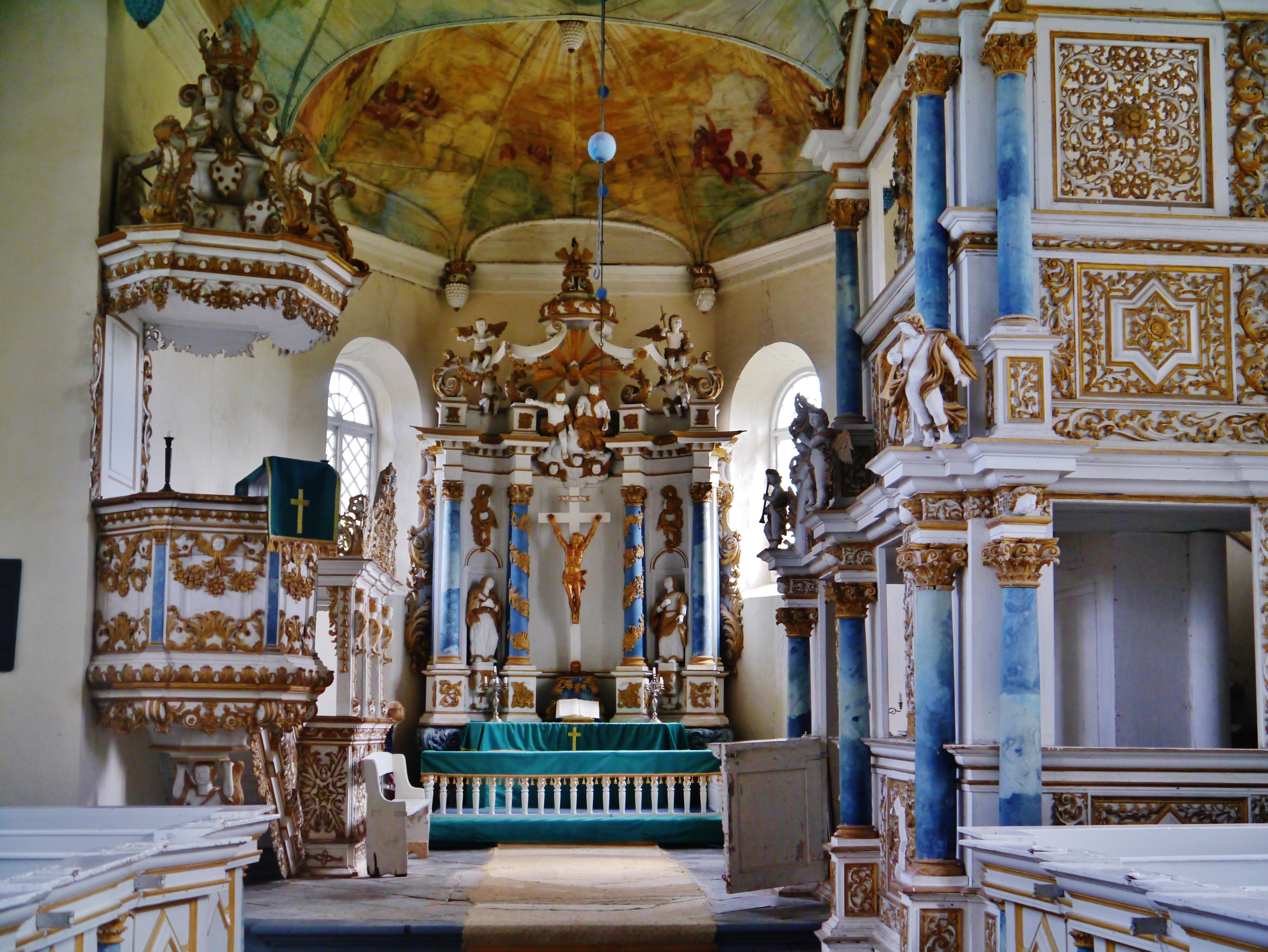
The altar of Apriķu Lutheran Church in Laža Parish, Latvia

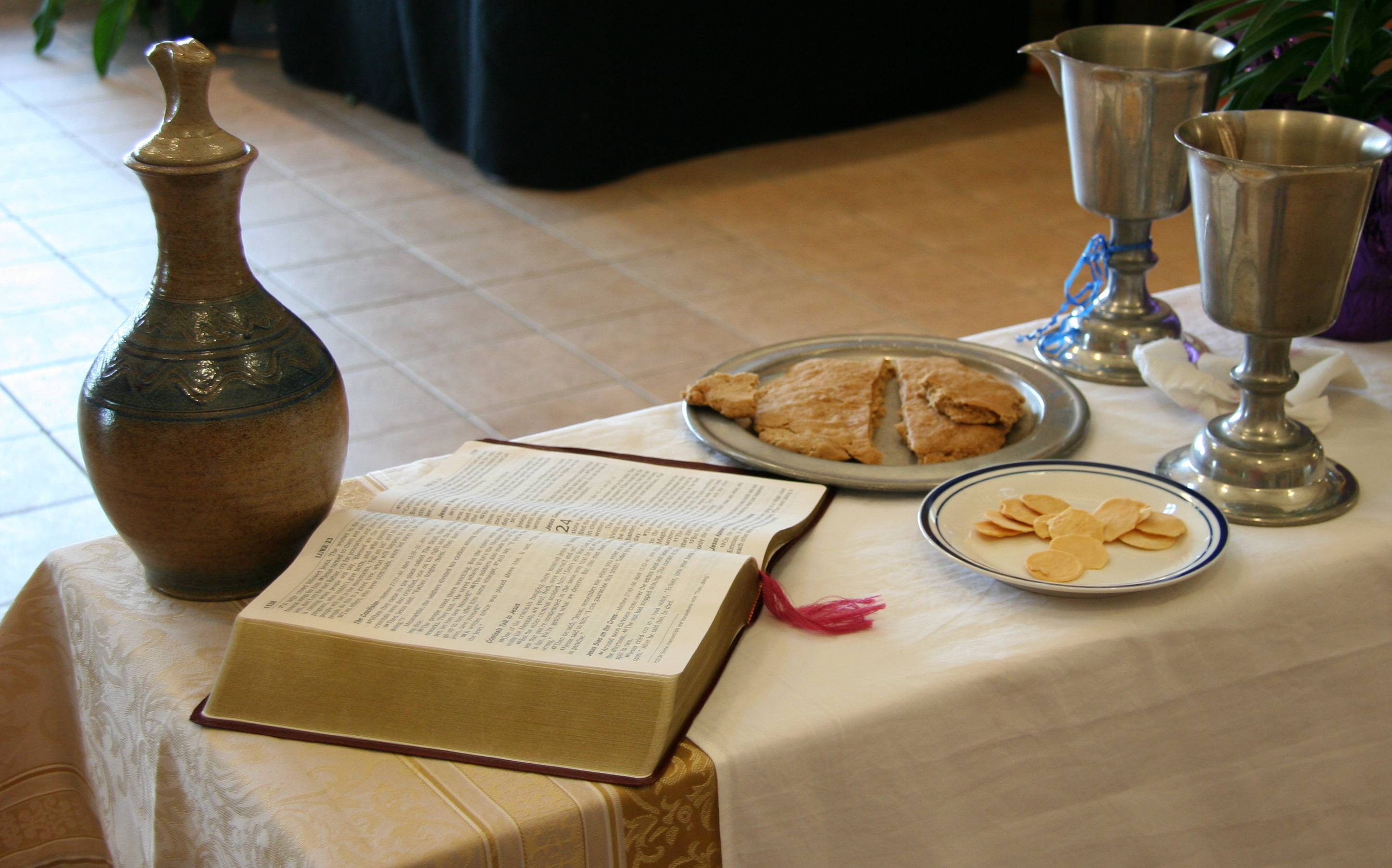
Communion setting at an Evangelical Lutheran Church in America (ELCA) worship service

An ELCA pastor elevating the chalice

Eucharistic reception at a church in the LCMS

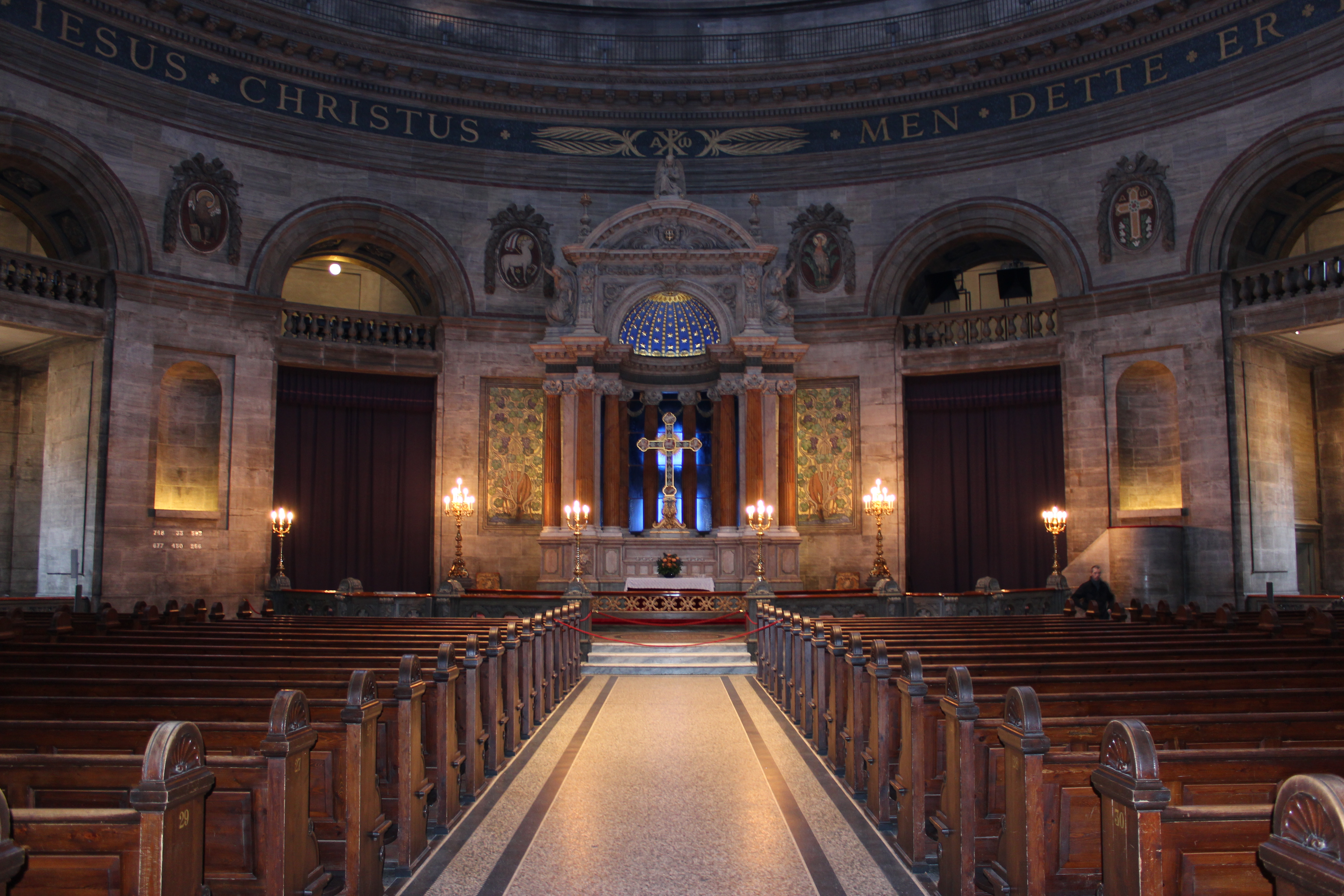
The chancel of Frederik's Church, part of the Evangelical-Lutheran Church in Denmark

Eucharistic reception at a church in the Evangelical Church in Germany (EKD)

An ELCA congregation kneeling as the congregation receives the Eucharist

The reading of the Gospel during the offering of the Mass at Vadstena Abbey Church, Sweden

The faithful bow towards the processional cross and make the sign of the cross as it passes in the recession

== See also ==
- Agenda (liturgy)
- Eucharistic theologies contrasted
