= Eastern Christianity =

Christian traditions originating from Greek- and Syriac-speaking populations

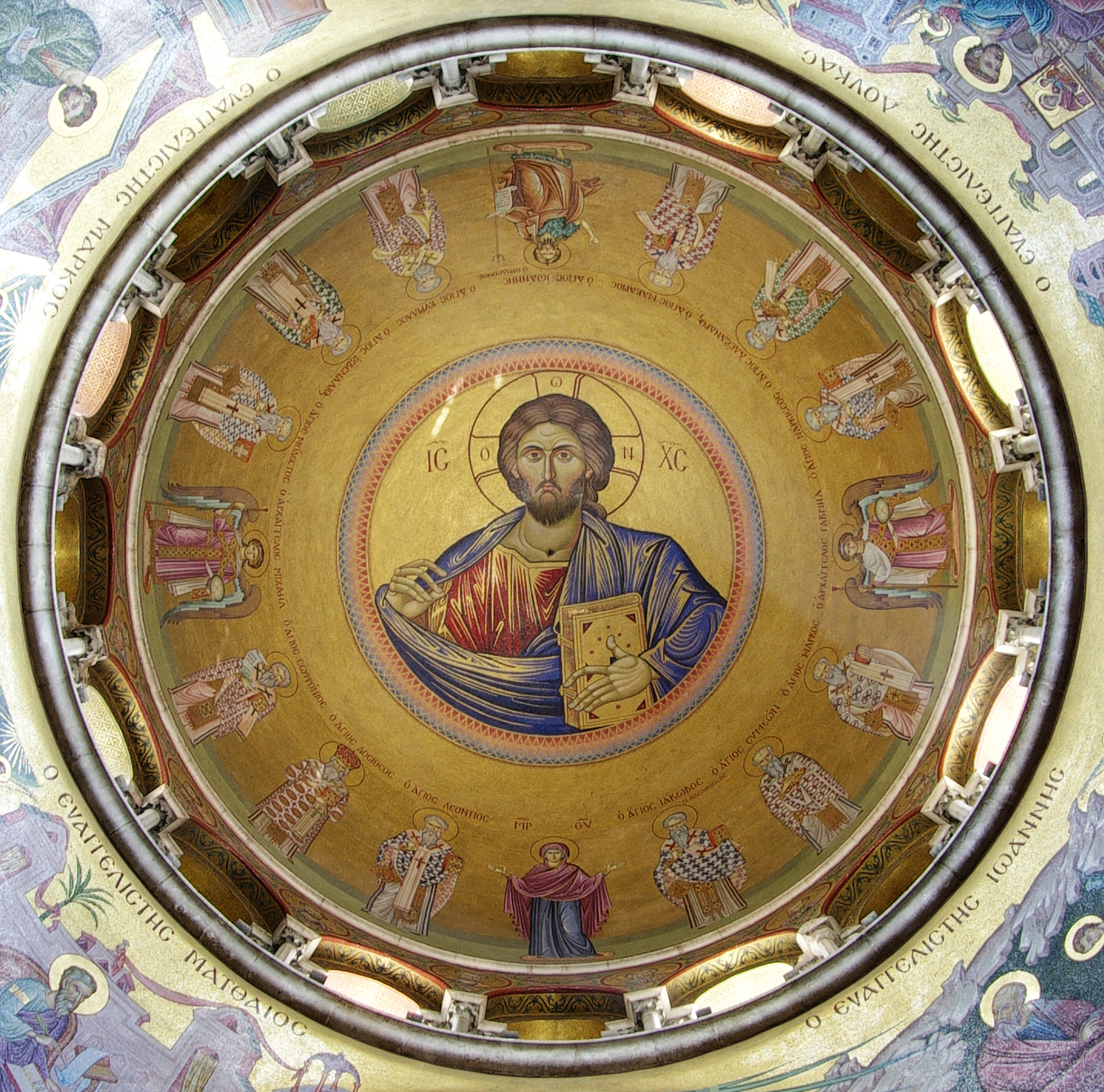
Jesus depicted on the dome over the katholikon at the Holy-Sepulchre, Jerusalem; art in Eastern Christianity

Eastern Christianity is one of two major classifications used to categorize church bodies with shared orientation within common historical root. Eastern Christianity is a category contrasted with Western Christianity, which comprises those Christian traditions and churches that originally were based to the west along the Mediterranean region. Eastern Christianity comprises church families within Christian traditions that originally developed during classical and late antiquity in the Eastern Mediterranean region and their later extensions. The term does not refer to any single communion or particular church body. The term does not imply any unity of different communion of churches within its classification nor plurality of churches within this classification implies any disunity within any singular communion.

Major Eastern Christian communions include the Eastern Orthodox Church and the Oriental Orthodox Churches, along with churches descended from the historic Church of the East (Assyrian Church of the East and its offshoot, the Ancient Church of the East), as well as the Eastern Catholic Churches (which are in communion with Rome while maintaining their respective liturgical heritage), and the Eastern Protestant churches..

The Eastern Orthodox Church is the largest body within Eastern Christianity with a worldwide population of 220 million, followed by the Oriental Orthodox Churches at 60 million. The Eastern Catholic Churches consist of about 16–18 million and are a small minority within the Catholic Church. Eastern Protestant Christian churches do not form a single communion; the Ukrainian Lutheran Church claims 2,500 members while the Malankara Mar Thoma Syrian Church claims over one million members. The Assyrian Church of the East and the Ancient Church of the East, descendant churches of the Assyria-based Church of the East, have a combined membership of approximately 400,000.

Historically, Eastern Christianity could also referred to churches in Persian Empire that lay further east of the Roman Empire and could also referred to non-Greek churches within Eastern Roman Empire. However, with the advent of early Muslim conquests in the 7th century onwards, the term Eastern Church increasingly came to be identified with the Greek rite half of the Chalcedonian Christianity that would later centered in Constantinople following mutual separation with Western half from eleventh century onwards. This term is contrasted with the (Western) Latin Church, centered on Rome, which uses the Latin liturgical rites. The terms "Eastern" and "Western" in this regard originated with geographical divisions in Christianity mirroring the cultural divide between the Hellenistic East and the Latin West, and the political divide of 395 AD between the Western and Eastern Roman Empires. Since the Protestant Reformation of the 16th century, the term "Eastern Christianity" may be used in contrast with "Western Christianity", which contains not only the Latin Church but also forms of Protestantism and Independent Catholicism. Eastern Catholic churches on the other hand, have more in common historically and theologically with Western Christianity than with other Eastern Christians.

Because the largest church in the Eastern Christianity is the Eastern Orthodox Church, the term "Orthodox" is also often used in an interchangeable manner with "Eastern Christianity", despite existence of other distinct Eastern Christian communions or traditions, which includes Oriental Orthodox, True Orthodoxy, and Old Believers. However, all Christian denominations including the ones who don't label themselves "Orthodox", whether Eastern or Western, regard themselves as orthodox in the literal sense, meaning "following correct beliefs". Likewise, all Christian denominations considered themselves to be "catholic" (meaning "universal"), and as sharing in the Four Marks of the Church listed in the Nicene-Constantinopolitan Creed (381 AD): "One, Holy, Catholic and Apostolic" (Greek: μία, ἁγία, καθολικὴ καὶ ἀποστολικὴ ἐκκλησία). (Note: This ecumenical creed is today recited in the liturgy of the Catholic Church (both Latin and Eastern Rites), the Eastern Orthodox Church, the Oriental Orthodox Churches, the Church of the East, the Moravian Church, the Lutheran Churches, the Methodist Churches, the Anglican Communion, the Reformed Churches, and other Christian denominations.)

Eastern churches (excepting the non-liturgical dissenting bodies) utilize several liturgical rites: the Alexandrian Rite, the Armenian Rite, the Byzantine Rite, the East Syriac Rite (also known as Persian or Assyrian Rite), and the West Syriac Rite (also called the Antiochian Rite).

== Families of churches ==
Comparative distribution of Eastern Orthodoxy and Oriental Orthodoxy in the world by country Legend: Eastern Orthodoxy / Oriental Orthodoxy; Dominant religion (more than 75%) / Dominant religion (more than 75%); Majority religion (50–75%) / Majority religion (50–75%); Important minority religion (20–50%) / Important minority religion (20–50%); Important minority religion (5–20%) / Important minority religion (5–20%); Minority religion (1–5%) / Minority religion (1–5%)

Eastern Christians do not all share the same religious traditions, but many do share cultural traditions. Christianity divided itself in the East during its early centuries both within and outside of the Roman Empire in disputes about fundamental theology such as Christology, as well as through national divisions (Roman, Persian, etc.). It would be many centuries later that Western Christianity fully split from these traditions as its own communion. Major branches or families of Eastern Christianity, each holding a distinct theological dogmas, including of the Eastern Orthodox Church, the Oriental Orthodox communion, the Eastern Catholic Churches and the Assyrian Church of the East.

In most Eastern churches, clergy is required to administer the sacrament of chrismation to infants after baptism before giving the Eucharist to them. Married man are allowed to be ordained as priest, provided they are not a divorcee. The Eastern Catholic Churches recognize the authority of the Pope of Rome, but those who have originally been part of other Eastern Christian churches closely follow the traditions of Eastern Orthodoxy, Oriental Orthodoxy, or Church of the East, including the tradition of allowing married men to become priests.

The Eastern churches' differences from Western Christianity have to do with theology, as well as liturgy, culture, language, and politics. For the non-Catholic Eastern churches, a definitive date for the commencement of schism cannot usually be given (see East–West Schism). The Church of the East declared independence from the churches of the Roman Empire at its general council in 424, which was before the Council of Ephesus in 431, and so had nothing to do with the theology declared at that council. Oriental Orthodoxy exist as distinct communion after the Council of Chalcedon in 451 but did not immediately form separate patriarchates until 518 (in the case of the Syriac Patriarchate of Antioch) and 536 (in the case of the Coptic Patriarchate of Alexandria).

Since the time of the historian Edward Gibbon, the split between the Church of Rome and rest of the churches in the East has been conveniently dated to 1054, though the reality is more complex as there was break of communion before and numerous attempted reunions after that date. This split is sometimes referred to as the Great Schism, but is now more usually called the East–West Schism. This final schism reflected a larger cultural and political division which had developed in Europe and Southwest Asia during the Middle Ages and coincided with Western Europe's re-emergence from the collapse of the Western Roman Empire.

Eastern Protestant church on the other hand emerged after engagement of Protestant missions that attempted to reform Eastern Christianity in the way they reformed the Western church before. The Ukrainian Lutheran Church developed within Galicia around 1926, with its rites being based on the Liturgy of Saint John Chrysostom, rather than on the Western Formula Missae.

=== Eastern Orthodox Church ===
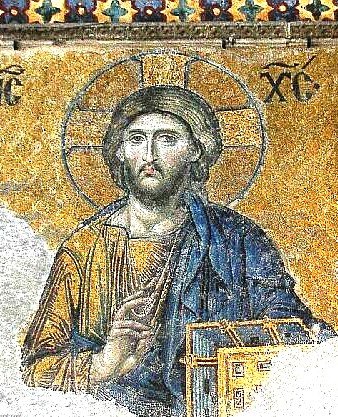
Christ Pantocrator, detail of the Deesis mosaic in Hagia Sophia – Constantinople (Istanbul) 12th century

The Eastern Orthodox Church is an Eastern Christian communion whose adherents are largely based in Western Asia (particularly Syria, Lebanon, Jordan, Israel, and Palestine) and Turkey, Eastern Europe, the Balkans and the Caucasus (Georgia), with a growing presence in the Western world. Eastern Orthodox Christians accept the decisions of the first seven ecumenical councils.

Eastern Orthodox Christianity identifies itself as the original Christian church (see early centers of Christianity) founded by Christ and the Apostles, and traces its lineage back to the early Church through the process of apostolic succession and unchanged theology and practice. Characteristics of the Eastern Orthodox Church include the Byzantine Rite (shared with some Eastern Catholic Churches) and an emphasis on the continuation of Holy Tradition, which it holds to be apostolic in nature.

The Eastern Orthodox Church is organized into self-governing jurisdictions along geographical, national, ethnic or linguistic lines. Eastern Orthodoxy is thus made up of fourteen or seventeen autocephalous bodies. Smaller churches are either autonomous or semi-autonomous, and each belonged to an autocephalous mother church.

All Eastern Orthodox are united in dogmatic agreement and sacramental life with each other, though a few are not in communion at present, for non-doctrinal reasons. This is in contrast to the Catholic Church and its various churches. Members of the latter are all in communion with each other, parts of a top-down hierarchy (see primus inter pares). The Eastern Orthodox reject the Filioque clause as contrast to Catholics. The Catholic Church was once in communion with the Eastern Orthodox Church, but the two split after the East–West Schism and are no longer in communion.

It is estimated that there are approximately 240 million Eastern Orthodox Christians in the world. (Note: See details about major religious groups.) Today, many adherents shun the term "Eastern" as denying the church's universal character. They refer to Eastern Orthodoxy simply as the Orthodox Church.

=== Oriental Orthodoxy ===
Oriental Orthodoxy refers to the churches of Eastern Christian tradition that keep the faith of the first three ecumenical councils of the undivided Christian Church: the First Council of Nicaea (AD 325), the First Council of Constantinople (381) and the Council of Ephesus (431), while rejecting the dogmatic definitions of the Council of Chalcedon (451). Hence, these churches are also called the Old Oriental churches. They are the Coptic Orthodox Church, the Malankara Orthodox Church (India), the Eritrean Orthodox Tewahedo Church, the Ethiopian Orthodox Tewahedo Church, the Syriac Orthodox Church and the Armenian Apostolic Church.

Oriental Orthodoxy developed in reaction to Chalcedon on the eastern limit of the Byzantine Empire and in Egypt, Syria and Mesopotamia. In those locations, there are also Eastern Orthodox patriarchs, but the rivalry between the two has largely vanished in the centuries since the schism.

=== Church of the East ===
Historically, the Church of the East was the widest reaching branch of Eastern Christianity, at its height spreading from its heartland in Persian-ruled Assyria to the Mediterranean, India, and China. Originally the only Christian church recognized by Zoroastrian-led Sassanid Persia (through its alliance with the Lakhmids, the regional rivals to the Byzantines and its Ghassanid vassal), the Church of the East declared itself independent of other churches in 424 and over the next century became affiliated with Nestorianism, a Christological doctrine advanced by Nestorius, Patriarch of Constantinople from 428 to 431, which had been declared heretical in the Roman Empire. Thereafter it was often known in the West, possibly inaccurately, as the Nestorian Church. Surviving a period of persecution within Persia, the Church of the East flourished under the Abbasid Caliphate and branched out, establishing dioceses throughout Asia. After another period of expansion under the Mongol Empire, the church went into decline starting in the 14th century, and was eventually largely confined to its founding Assyrian adherent's heartland in the Assyrian homeland, although another remnant survived on the Malabar Coast of India.

In the 16th century, dynastic struggles sent the church into schism, resulting in the formation of two rival churches: The Chaldean Catholic Church, which entered into communion with Rome as an Eastern Catholic Church, and the Assyrian Church of the East. The followers of these two churches are almost exclusively ethnic Assyrians. In India, the local Church of the East community, known as the Saint Thomas Christians, experienced its own rifts as a result of Portuguese influence.

==== Assyrian Church of the East ====
The Assyrian Church of the East emerged from the historical Church of the East, which was centered in Mesopotamia/Assyria, then part of the Persian Empire, and spread widely throughout Asia. The modern Assyrian Church of the East emerged in the 16th century following a split with the Chaldean Church, which later entered into communion with Rome as an Eastern Catholic Church.

The Church of the East was associated with the doctrine of Nestorianism, advanced by Nestorius, Patriarch of Constantinople from 428 to 431, which emphasized the disunion between the human and divine natures of Jesus. Nestorius and his doctrine were condemned at the Council of Ephesus in 431, leading to the Nestorian Schism in which churches supporting Nestorius split from the rest of Christianity.

Many followers relocated to Persia and became affiliated with the local Christian community there. This community adopted an increasingly Nestorian theology and was thereafter often known as the Nestorian Church. As such, the Church of the East accepts only the first two ecumenical councils of the undivided Church—the First Council of Nicaea and the First Council of Constantinople—as defining its faith tradition, and rapidly took a different course from other Eastern Christians.

The Church of the East spread widely through Persia and into Asia, being introduced to India by the 6th century and to the Mongols and China in the 7th century. It experienced periodic expansion until the 14th century, when the church was nearly destroyed by the collapse of the Mongol Empire and the conquests of Timur. By the 16th century it was largely confined to Iraq, northeast Syria, southeast Turkey, northwest Iran and the Malabar Coast of India (Kerala). The split of the 15th century, which saw the emergence of separate Assyrian and Chaldean Churches, left only the former as an independent sect. Additional splits into the 20th century further affected the history of the Assyrian Church of the East.

==== Saint Thomas Syrian Christians ====
The Saint Thomas Syrian Christians are an ancient body of Syrian Christians in Kerala, Malabar coast of India who trace their origins to the evangelical activity of Thomas the Apostle in the 1st century. Many Assyrian and Jewish communities like the Knanaya and the Cochin Jews assimilated into the Saint Thomas Syrian Christian community. By the 5th century the Saint Thomas Syrian Christians were part of the Church of the East (Nestorian Church). Until the middle of the 17th century and the arrival of the Portuguese, the Thomas Christians were all one in faith and rite. Thereafter, divisions arose among them, and consequently they are today of several different rites. The East Syriac Chaldean Rite (Edessan Rite) churches among the Saint Thomas Syrian Christians are the Syro Malabar Church and the Chaldean Syrian Church. The West Syriac Antiochian Rite churches among the Saint Thomas Syrian Christians are the Malankara Jacobite Syrian Church, the Malankara Orthodox Syrian Church, the Mar Thoma Syrian Church, the Syro Malankara Church and the Thozhiyur Church.

=== Eastern Catholic Churches ===
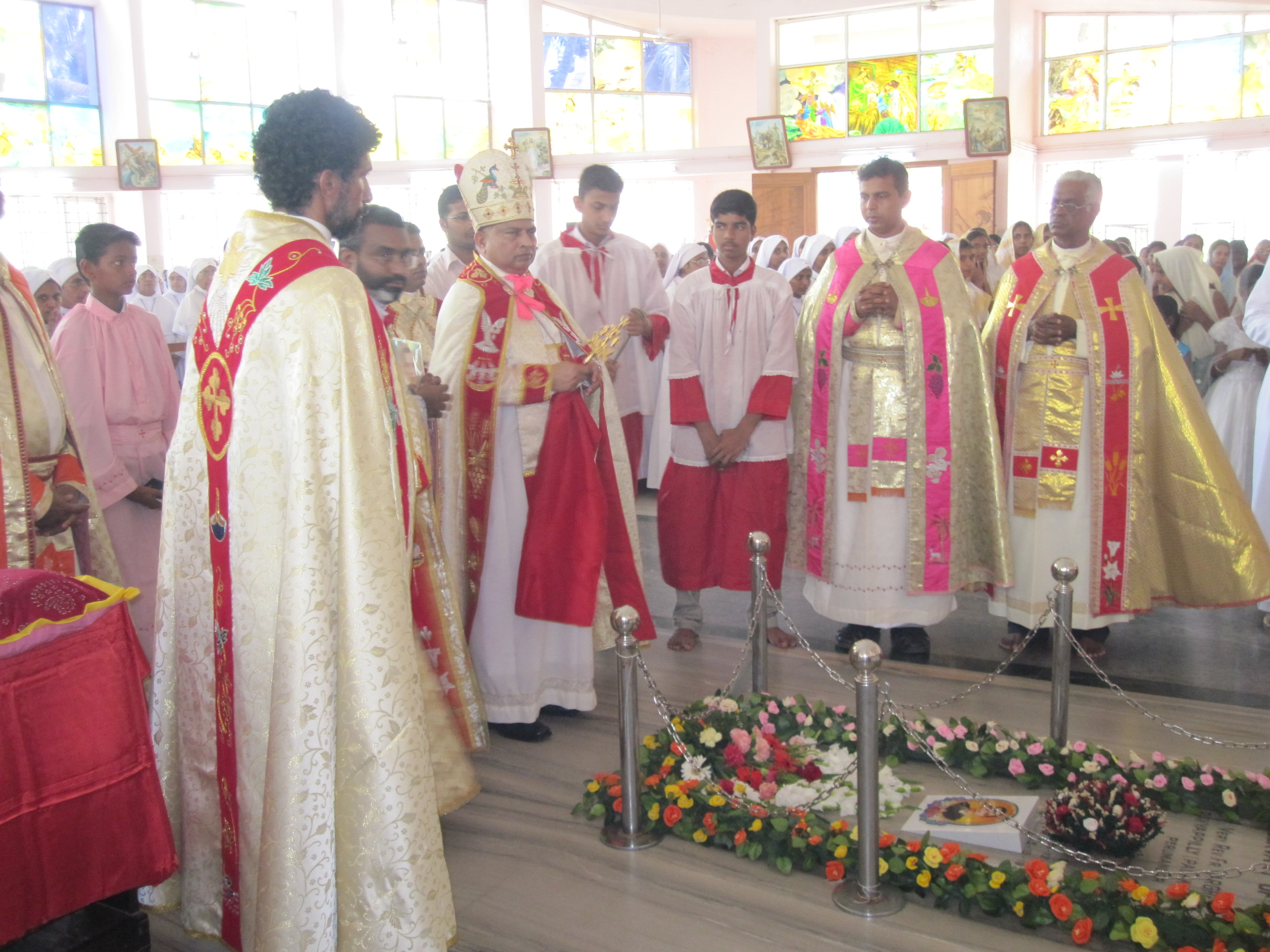
An Eastern Catholic bishop of the Syro-Malabar Church holding the Mar Thoma Cross which symbolizes the heritage and identity of the Saint Thomas Christians of India

The twenty-three Eastern Catholic Churches are in communion with the Holy See at the Vatican whilst being rooted in the theological and liturgical traditions of Eastern Christianity. Most of these churches were originally part of the Orthodox East, but have since been reconciled to the Latin Church.

Many of these churches were originally part of one of the above families and so are closely related to them by way of ethos and liturgical practice. As in the other Eastern churches, married men may become priests, and parish priests administer the mystery of confirmation to newborn infants immediately after baptism, via the rite of chrismation; the infants are then administered Holy Communion.

The Syro-Malabar Church, which is part of the Saint Thomas Christian community in India, follows East Syriac traditions and liturgy. Other Saint Thomas Christians of India, who were originally of the same East Syriac tradition, passed instead to the West Syriac tradition and now form part of Oriental Orthodoxy (some from the Oriental Orthodox in India united with the Catholic Church in 1930 and became the Syro-Malankara Catholic Church). The Maronite Church claims never to have been separated from Rome, and has no counterpart Orthodox Church out of communion with the Pope. It is therefore inaccurate to refer to it as a "Uniate" Church. The Italo-Albanian Catholic Church has also never been out of communion with Rome, but, unlike the Maronite Church, it resembles the liturgical rite of the Eastern Orthodox Church.

=== Dissenting movements ===
In addition to these four mainstream branches, there are a number of much smaller groups which originated from disputes with the dominant tradition of their original areas. Most of these are either part of the more traditional Old Believer movement, which arose from a schism within Russian Orthodoxy, or the more radical Spiritual Christianity movement. The latter includes a number of diverse "low-church" groups, from the Bible-centered Molokans to the anarchic Doukhobors to the self-mutilating Skoptsy. None of these groups are in communion with the mainstream churches listed above. There are also national dissidents, where ethnic groups want their own nation-church, such as the Montenegrin Orthodox Church in domicile of the Serbian Orthodox Church. There are also some Reformed churches which share characteristics of Eastern Christianity, to varying extents.

==== "True Orthodox" churches ====
Starting in the 1920s, parallel hierarchies formed in opposition to local Orthodox churches over ecumenism and other matters. These jurisdictions sometimes refer to themselves as being "True Orthodox". In Russia, underground churches formed and maintained solidarity with the Russian Orthodox Church Outside Russia until the late 1970s. There are now traditionalist Orthodox in every area, though in Asia and Egypt their presence is negligible.

==== Eastern Protestant churches ====
Eastern Protestant Christianity is a collection of heterogeneous Protestant denominations which are mostly the result of Protestant Churches adopting Reformation variants of Orthodox Christian liturgy and worship. Some others are the result of reformations of Orthodox Christian beliefs and practices, inspired by the teachings of Western Protestant missionaries. Denominations of this category include the Malankara Mar Thoma Syrian Church , Ukrainian Lutheran Church, St. Thomas Evangelical Church of India, Evangelical Orthodox Church, etc.

===== Byzantine Rite Lutheranism =====
Byzantine Rite Lutheranism arose in the Ukrainian Lutheran Church around 1926. It sprung up in the region of Galicia and its rites are based on the Liturgy of Saint John Chrysostom. The church suffered persecution under the Communist régime, which implemented a policy of state atheism.

== Catholic–Orthodox ecumenism ==
Ecumenical dialogue since the 1964 meeting between Pope Paul VI and Orthodox Patriarch Athenagoras I has awoken the nearly 1,000-year hopes for Christian unity. Since the lifting of excommunications during the Paul VI and Athenagoras I meeting in Jerusalem there have been other significant meetings between Popes and Ecumenical Patriarchs of Constantinople. One of the most recent meetings was between Benedict XVI and Bartholomew I, who jointly signed the Common Declaration. It states that "We give thanks to the Author of all that is good, who allows us once again, in prayer and in dialogue, to express the joy we feel as brothers and to renew our commitment to move towards full communion".

In 2013 Patriarch Bartholomew I attended the installation ceremony of the new Catholic Pope, Francis, which was the first time any Ecumenical Patriarch of Constantinople had ever attended such an installation.

In 2019, Primate of the OCU Metropolitan of Kyiv and All Ukraine Epiphanius stated that "theoretically" the Orthodox Church of Ukraine and the Ukrainian Greek Catholic Church could in the future unite into a united church around the Kyiv throne. In 2019, the primate of the UGCC, Major Archbishop of Kyiv-Galicia Sviatoslav, stated that every effort should be made to restore the original unity of the Kyivan Church in its Orthodox and Catholic branches, saying that the restoration of Eucharistic communion between Rome and Constantinople is not a utopia.

=== Rejection of Uniatism ===
At a meeting in Balamand, Lebanon, in June 1993, the Joint International Commission for the Theological Dialogue between the Catholic Church and the Orthodox Church declared that these initiatives that "led to the union of certain communities with the See of Rome and brought with them, as a consequence, the breaking of communion with their Mother Churches of the East … took place not without the interference of extra-ecclesial interests"; and that what has been called "uniatism" "can no longer be accepted either as a method to be followed nor as a model of the unity our Churches are seeking" (section 12).

At the same time, the Commission stated:

- 3) Concerning the Eastern Catholic Churches, it is clear that they, as part of the Catholic Communion, have the right to exist and to act in response to the spiritual needs of their faithful.
- 16) The Oriental Catholic Churches who have desired to re-establish full communion with the See of Rome and have remained faithful to it, have the rights and obligations which are connected with this communion.
- 22) Pastoral activity in the Catholic Church, Latin as well as Oriental, no longer aims at having the faithful of one church pass over to the other; that is to say, it no longer aims at proselytizing among the Orthodox. It aims at answering the spiritual needs of its own faithful and it has no desire for expansion at the expense of the Orthodox Church. Within these perspectives, so that there will be no longer place for mistrust and suspicion, it is necessary that there be reciprocal exchanges of information about various pastoral projects and that thus cooperation between bishops and all those with responsibilities in our churches, can be set in motion and develop.

== Migration trends ==
There has been a significant Christian migration in the 20th century from the Near East. Fifteen hundred years ago Christians were the majority population in today's Turkey, Iraq, Syria, Lebanon, Jordan, Palestine and Egypt. In 1914 Christians constituted 25% of the population of the Ottoman Empire. At the beginning of the 21st century Christians constituted 6–7% of the region's population: less than 1% in Turkey, 3% in Iraq, 12% in Syria, 39% in Lebanon, 6% in Jordan, 2.5% in Israel/Palestine and 15–20% in Egypt.

As of 2011 Eastern Orthodox Christians are among the wealthiest Christians in the United States. They also tend to be better educated than most other religious groups in America, having a high number of graduate (68%) and post-graduate (28%) degrees per capita.

== Role of Christians in Arabic culture ==
Scholars and intellectuals agree Christians have made significant contributions to Arab and Islamic civilization since the introduction of Islam, and they have had a significant impact contributing the culture of the Middle East and North Africa and other areas. Byzantine science played an important and crucial role in the transmission of classical knowledge to the Islamic world.

Christians, especially Nestorians, contributed to the Arab Islamic Civilization during the Umayyads and the Abbasids by translating works of Greek philosophers to Syriac and afterwards to Arabic. They also excelled in philosophy, science (such as Hunayn ibn Ishaq, Qusta ibn Luqa, Masawaiyh, Patriarch Eutychius, Jabril ibn Bukhtishu etc.) and theology (such as Tatian, Bar Daisan, Babai the Great, Nestorius, Toma bar Yacoub, etc.) and the personal physicians of the Abbasid Caliphs were often Assyrian Christians such as the long serving Bukhtishus. Many scholars of the House of Wisdom were of Christian background.

A hospital and medical training center existed at Gundeshapur. The city of Gundeshapur was founded in AD 271 by the Sassanid king Shapur I. It was one of the major cities in Khuzestan province of the Persian empire in what is today Iran. A large percentage of the population was Syriacs, most of whom were Christians. Under the rule of Khusraw I, refuge was granted to Greek Nestorian Christian philosophers including the scholars of the Persian School of Edessa (Urfa), also called the academy of Athens, a Christian theological and medical university. These scholars made their way to Gundeshapur in 529 following the closing of the academy by Emperor Justinian. They were engaged in medical sciences and initiated the first translation projects of medical texts. The arrival of these medical practitioners from Edessa marks the beginning of the hospital and medical center at Gundeshapur. It included a medical school and hospital (bimaristan), a pharmacology laboratory, a translation house, a library and an observatory. Indian doctors also contributed to the school at Gundeshapur, most notably the medical researcher Mankah. Later after Islamic invasion, the writings of Mankah and of the Indian doctor Sustura were translated into Arabic at Baghdad. Daud al-Antaki was one of the last generation of influential Arab Christian writers.

Arab Christians and Arabic-speaking Christians, played important roles in the Nahda, and because Arab Christians formed the educated upper and bourgeois classes, they have had a significant impact in politics, business and culture, and most important figures of the Nahda movement were Christian Arabs. Today Arab Christians still play important roles in the Arab world, and Christians are relatively wealthy, well educated, and politically moderate.

== See also ==
- Apophatic theology
- Ascetical theology
- Cappadocian Fathers
- Desert Fathers
- Eastern Christian monasticism
- Eastern Orthodox – Roman Catholic ecclesiastical differences
- Eastern Orthodox Christian theology
- Eastern Party
- Essence–energies distinction (Eastern Orthodox theology)
- History of Eastern Christianity
- History of the Eastern Orthodox Church
- Index of Eastern Christianity–related articles
- Interparliamentary Assembly on Orthodoxy
- Mystical theology
- Syriac Christianity
- Tabor Light
