= Apriķi Manor =

Manor house in Laža parish, Aizpute, Courland, Latvia

- Apriķu muiža
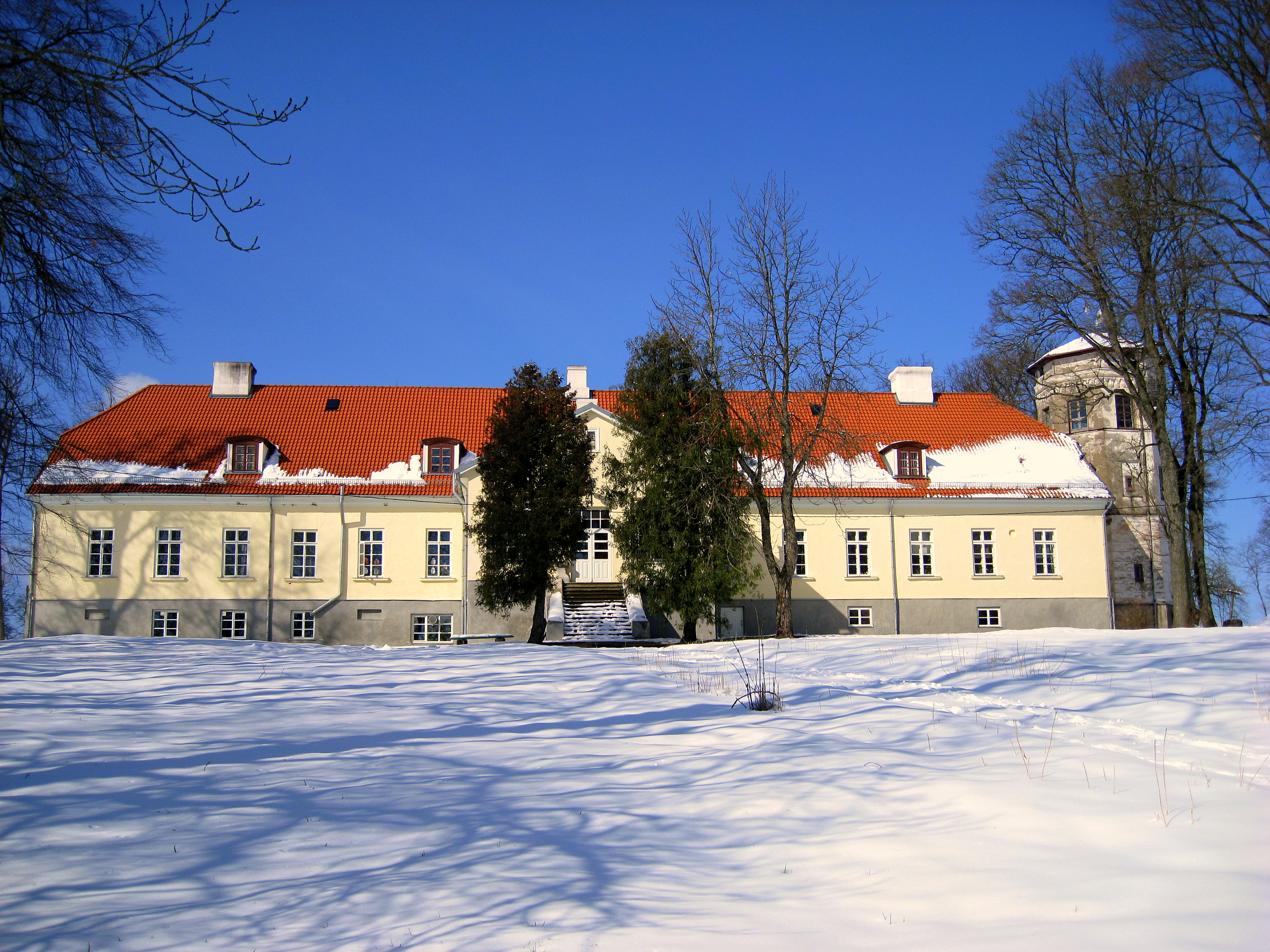

- Location within Latvia

General information
- Architectural style: Baroque, Neo-Gothic
- Location: Apriķi, Laža parish, South Kurzeme Municipality, Latvia
- Coordinates: 56°48′09.9″N 21°30′23.5″E
- Completed: 1742
- Client: von Osten-Sacken family

Apriķi Manor (Latvian: Apriķu muižas pils, German: Apprikken) is a manor house in Apriķi, Laža Parish, South Kurzeme Municipality, in the historical region of Courland, in western Latvia.

== History ==
Apriki Manor since the 16th century belonged to the Osten-Sacken noble family, and from 1790 to 1852 it was the property of the von Kroft family. At the beginning of 20th century manor was owned by Karl Gustav Mannerheim, who later became the President of Finland and is known for the legendary Mannerheim line, a fortification system during the Winter War.

The Apriķi Manor baroque ensemble on the bank of Alokste River dates back to the beginning of 18th century. The manor house was built before 1742, but its octagonal tower in Neo-Gothic style was built in the second half of the 19th century. Most of the other buildings - barn, brewery, mill - were built in the 19th century and a small landscape park was set up at the same time.

The building currently houses the Apriķi Primary School and the Apriķi Regional Museum, which includes an exhibit on Finnish soldier and politician Carl Gustaf Mannerheim who lived at the manor for a time in the early 20th century. Currently the manor houses the Apriķi Museum, whose expositions tell about the region's ancient history. The museum is also home to a large family of gnomes.

== See also ==
- List of palaces and manor houses in Latvia
