= Eastern Lutheranism =

Byzantine-rite expression of Lutheran Christianity

Eastern Lutheranism (also known as Byzantine Lutheranism or Byzantine Rite Lutheranism) refers to Eastern Protestant Lutheran churches, such as those of Ukraine, that use a form of the Byzantine Rite as their liturgy. Eastern Lutheran worship is based on the Eastern Christian rite used by the Eastern Orthodox Church, while incorporating theology from the Divine Service contained in the Formula Missae, the base texts for Lutheran liturgies in the West.

Eastern Lutherans use the Julian calendar for their calendar and thus observe feast days and liturgical seasons, such as Great Lent, in a fashion similar to Orthodox customs, so many Byzantine Lutheran holy days are shared with those of the Eastern Orthodox Church. Eastern Lutheran churches are constructed in accordance with Byzantine architecture. Posture during worship, such as bowing, is identical to that in other parts of Eastern Christianity. Within Byzantine Rite Lutheranism, the calendar of saints includes persons esteemed in Eastern Christianity, such as John Chrysostom and Nestor the Chronicler, as well as those specific to the Lutheran Church, such as Lucas Cranach the Elder and Martin Luther.

The Byzantine Lutheran Rite was first used in the Ukrainian Lutheran Church. The Byzantine Lutheran Rite includes the filioque in the Niceno-Constantinopolitan Creed, albeit placing it in brackets. The first published Liturgy of the Byzantine Lutheran Rite was in 1933. The English text of the rite now in use is almost identical to that of the original printing. Some contemporary communities such as the Eastern Rite Community (Ostkirchlicher Konvent) in Germany and the Czech Republic utilize the Byzantine Rite.

In the region of Galicia, Eastern Lutherans were persecuted by the communist regime, which instituted a policy of state atheism. From 1939–1945, many Eastern Lutheran clergy were killed for their faith. Theodor Yarchuk, a priest who was a major leader in the Ukrainian Lutheran Church of the Augsburg Confession was tortured and killed in Stanislaviv by communist authorities. Many Ukrainian Lutheran laypersons were also sent to the Gulag, where they died. During this time of the persecution of Christians in the Soviet Union, property of the Ukrainian Lutheran Church was expropriated. After the collapse of USSR, the Ukrainian Lutheran Church experienced a revival.

== See also ==
- Eastern Catholic Churches
- Eastern Protestantism
- High Church Lutheranism
- Lutheranism by region
- Ukrainian Lutheran Church
- Western Rite Orthodoxy
