= Hymn of the day =

Song sung as part of a Sunday service

The hymn of the day is a congregational hymn that is centered on the theme of the lectionary texts for a given Sunday divine service.

The practice was developed by Lutherans and is currently in use in other denominations. According to Carl Schalk, the hymn of the day came out of the singing of the gradual which is sung before the epistle reading.

Generally, it is used during the Word section of the liturgy, but can vary in its placement depending on which Lutheran hymnal is used. For example, the Lutheran Book of Worship (1978) suggests that the hymn of the day be placed either immediately before or after the sermon. The newer Evangelical Lutheran Worship (2006), however, only suggests its use after the sermon.

Regardless of placement, some Lutherans, including Schalk, believe this to be the most important hymn in the worship service.
