= Laža Parish =

Parish of Latvia

- parish of Latvia
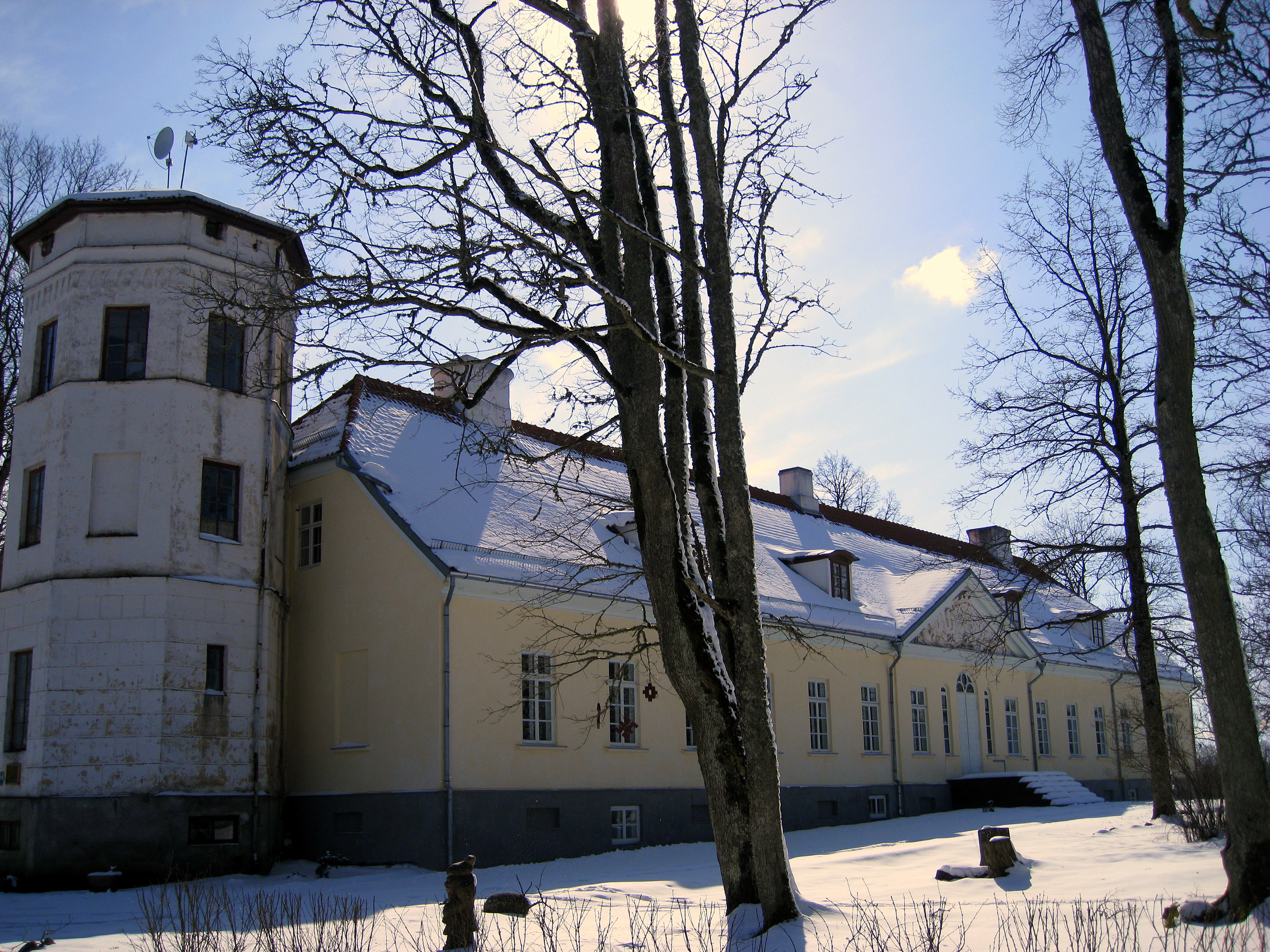

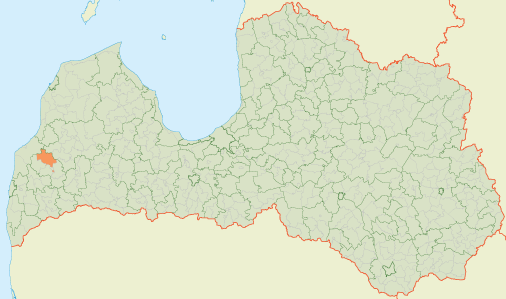
- 56°47′57″N 21°31′34″E

- Location within Latvia
- Country: Latvia

Area
  - Total: 160.06 km^{2} (61.80 sq mi)
  - Land: 150.77 km^{2} (58.21 sq mi)
  - Water: 9.29 km^{2} (3.59 sq mi)

Population (1 January 2026)
  - Total: 431
  - Density: 2.86/km^{2} (7.40/sq mi)

Laža Parish (Latvian: Lažas pagasts) is an administrative unit of South Kurzeme Municipality, Latvia. The parish has a population of 662 (as of 1/07/2010) and covers an area of 160.1 km^{2}.

== Villages of Laža parish ==
- Apriķi
- Lanksēži
- Mežgaļi
- Padure (Aizputes Padure)
- Štakeldanga
- Tebras

== See also ==
- Apriķi Manor
