= Deutsche Messe =

German Mass published by Martin Luther in 1526

Deutsche Messe ("German Mass"; full title: Deutsche Messe und Ordnung des Gottesdiensts, "German Mass and Order of Worship") was published by Martin Luther in 1526. It followed his work Formula Missae from the year 1523, pertaining to the celebration of a Latin mass. Both of these masses were meant only as suggestions made on request and were not expected to be used exactly as they were, but could be altered. The function of the mass, according to Luther, is to make people hear the word.

The German Mass was completely chanted, except for the sermon.

== Order of Luther's Deutsche Messe ==
A spiritual song or a psalm in German
Kyrie eleison (three fold)
Collect (read facing the altar)
Epistle (read facing the people)
A German hymn (by the whole choir)
Gospel (read facing the people)
Creed sung in German
Sermon (on the Gospel)
Paraphrase of the Lord's Prayer
Exhortation to those who will commune
Consecration of the Bread.
Elevation of the Body of Christ
Distribution of the Body of Christ
Sanctus paraphrased in German (or the hymns "Gott sei gelobet und gebenedeiet" or "Jesus Christus, unser Heiland, der von uns den Gotteszorn wandt")
Consecration of the Wine
Distribution of the Blood of Christ
Sanctus or Agnus Dei in German (or the hymns "Gott sei gelobet und gebenedeiet" or "Jesus Christus, unser Heiland, der von uns den Gotteszorn wandt")
Thanksgiving Collect
Aaronic Benediction
