= Ukrainian Lutheran Church =

Eastern-rite Lutheran denomination in Ukraine

- Українська Лютеранська Церква
- Seal of the Ukrainian Lutheran Church
- Type: Eastern Protestant
- Classification: Eastern Lutheran
- Orientation: Confessional Lutheran
- Scripture: Bible
- Polity: Modified episcopal polity with some powers reserved to the congregation as in congregationalism
- Associations: Confessional Evangelical Lutheran Conference
- Region: Ukraine
- Liturgy: Byzantine Rite
- Origin: 1933; Kyiv, Ukraine
- Congregations: about 25
- Members: 2,500
- Other name: Ukrainian Evangelical Church of the Augsburg Confession
- Official website: ukrlc.org

The Ukrainian Lutheran Church (ULC; Ukrainian: Украї́нська Лютера́нська Це́рква, romanized: Ukrayínsʹka Liuteránsʹka Tsérkva, IPA: [ʊkrɐˈjinʲsʲkɐ lʲʊteˈranʲsʲkɐ ˈt͡sɛrkʋɐ]), formerly called the Ukrainian Evangelical Church of the Augsburg Confession (Украї́нська Єва́нгельська Це́рква А́угсбурзького Віросповіда́ння, Ukrayínsʹka Yevánhelʹsʹka Tsérkva Áuhsburzʹkoho Virospovidánnia), is a Byzantine Rite Lutheran Church based in Ukraine. The Eastern Christian denomination consists of 25 congregations within Ukraine, serving over 2,500 members and runs Saint Sophia Ukrainian Lutheran Theological Seminary in Ternopil in Western Ukraine.

The ULC is a member of the Confessional Evangelical Lutheran Conference (CELC), a worldwide organization of confessional Lutheran church bodies of the same beliefs.

== Beliefs and worship ==
The Ukrainian Lutheran Church uses the Revised Julian calendar for the liturgical year and thus observes feast days and liturgical seasons, such as Great Lent, in a fashion similar to Orthodox customs.

Posture during worship, such as bowing, is identical to that in other parts of Eastern Christianity. The calendar of saints used by the Ukrainian Lutheran Church includes persons esteemed in Eastern Christianity, such as John Chrysostom and Nestor the Chronicler, as well as those specific to the Lutheran Church, such as Lucas Cranach the Elder and Martin Luther.

The ULC teaches that the Bible is the only authoritative source for doctrine. It subscribes to the Lutheran Confessions (the Book of Concord) as accurate presentations of what Scripture teaches. It teaches that Jesus is the center of Scripture and the way to eternal salvation, and that the Holy Spirit uses the gospel in Word and Sacrament (Baptism, Holy Communion and Confession and Absolution) to bring people to faith in Jesus as Saviour and keep them in that faith, strengthening them in their daily life of sanctification.

Ukrainian Lutheran parishes are constructed in accordance with Byzantine architecture.

The Ukrainian Lutheran Church uses the Luther Rose with an Suppedaneum Cross in the centre as its seal.

== History ==
Ukrainian Lutheranism originated in the sixteenth century. A Ukrainian deacon also named Martin stayed in the home of Martin Luther. In 1933, the Ukrainian Lutheran Liturgy was published, the first modern Liturgy of Byzantine Rite Lutheranism.

The ULC traces its roots to early Lutheranism in the 16th century, and more recently, to the Ukrainian Evangelical Church of the Augsburg Confession which was persecuted by the KGB and Soviet government, which held a policy of state atheism, in 1939. From 1939-1945, many Byzantine Lutheran clergy were martyred for their faith. Theodor Yarchuk, a priest who was a major leader in the Ukrainian Evangelical Church of the Augsburg Confession was tortured and killed in Stanislaviv by communist authorities. Many Ukrainian Lutheran laypersons were also sent to the Gulag, where they died.

In the diaspora, parts of the Lutheran Church survived. In 1989, Pastor Yaroslav Shepeliavets from a Ukrainian Lutheran Church in Minnesota ordered over 100,000 Bibles from Germany, translated to Ukrainian, once Communist controls on religion were relaxed late in Perestroika.

The ULC was reorganized in 1994 by several Lutheran congregations in Ukraine after the fall of the Soviet Union and the loosening of restrictions on religious expression. It grew into existence through active mission work by the Evangelical Lutheran Synod mission organization "Thoughts of Faith" in the 1980s and 1990s.

The ULC is legally seen as the successor to the earlier church body and has been given the right to reclaim some of the church property that had been seized by the Soviet government. The ULC has been officially registered with the government of Ukraine as a Christian denomination since 1996.

== Affiliations and ecumenical relations ==
The ULC is a member of the Confessional Evangelical Lutheran Conference (CELC), a worldwide organization of confessional Lutheran church bodies of the same beliefs.

The Ukrainian Lutheran Church is a member of the Council of Churches of Ukraine, an ecumenical organisation.
