= Formula Missae =

Formula missae et communionis pro ecclesia Vuittembergensi (1523) is a 16th-century tract on the reform of the Latin liturgy composed by Martin Luther for Lutheran churches in Wittenberg, Germany. Formula missae was not itself a new mass, but rather an outline and guide for using the existing missals and office books in Latin, with the primary difference being the omission of the Canon of the Mass. It was not prescriptive for Lutherans in general, but was widely influential as Lutherans sought to bring their worship into harmony with their theology. The Formulae Missae was included in Luther's "scriptural correctives" which was how he intended to align the inherited liturgies with the Bible.

It was followed three years later by the Deutsche Messe (German Mass), a guide to mass in the vernacular, which adopted ideas from the Formula Missae. Latin liturgy for both mass and office continued in use in various Lutheran churches and cathedrals for more than two centuries afterward, still guided by the influence of Luther's Formula missae.

== Parts ==
- Introit
- Kyrie
- Gloria in Excelsis Deo
- Collect
- Epistle
- Gradual or Alleluia
- Gospel (optionally with candles and incensation)
- Nicene Creed
- Sermon
- Preface
- Eucharistic Prayer
- Sanctus (including elevation of the elements during the Benedictus)
- Lord's Prayer
- Pax
- Distribution during Agnus Dei (the pastor communicating first himself and then the congregation)
- Collect
- Benedicamus
- Benediction
