= Hymnody of continental Europe =

Hymnody in continental Europe developed from early liturgical music, especially Gregorian chant. Music became more complicated as embellishments and variations were added, along with influences from secular music. Although vernacular leisen and vernacular or mixed-language carols were sung in the Middle Ages, more vernacular hymnody emerged during the Protestant Reformation, although ecclesiastical Latin continued to be used after the Reformation. Since then, developments have shifted between isorhythmic, homorhythmic, and more rounded musical forms with some lilting. Theological underpinnings influenced the narrative point of view used, with Pietism especially encouraging the use of the first person singular. In the last several centuries, many songs from Evangelicalism have been translated from English into German.

== New Testament ==
The sources of Christian music are the Jewish tradition of psalm singing, and the music of Hellenistic late antiquity. Paul the Apostle mentions psalms, hymns and sacred songs (Ephesians 5:19 and Colossians 3:16) but only in connection with the Christian behavior of the Christians, not with regard to worship music.

Among the earliest surviving Christian songs include those described in the New Testament traditional canticles as the Benedictus, the Magnificat and the Nunc dimittis.

Christ songs are hymns to Jesus of Nazareth as the Christ. Literary criticism makes it possible, on the basis of stylistic criteria, to elaborate Christ songs and liturgically used portions in the New Testament. In letters and texts some songs are quoted and mentioned, e.g. For example, the hymn to Christ in Philippians 2:6–11. It can be assumed that such texts were commonly known at the time and served to remind readers that its content was already general belief. Also, such texts may have been used for singing praises by the congregation.

Criteria:

- Often, phrases such as "we know..." introduce the beginning
- The persons change in connection. While the text itself is formulated as a form of address or speaks of the author in the "first person", it suddenly changes to the third person, and then afterwards continues in the original language again.
- In some places it is also explicitly pointed to a received tradition (what we have "received")

== Early church ==
Probably the earliest evidence for liturgical hymns outside of the New Testament can be found in the letters of Ignatius of Antioch in his Epistle to the Ephesians (7, 2 and 19, 2f).

In the fourth century, leading Church Fathers gave great prominence to parish singing: in the East, there were transformations of the liturgy under Basil of Caesarea. In the West, Bishop Ambrose of Milan made liturgical and musical reforms and the introduction of Ambrosian hymns still sung today. Ambrose introduced antiphons and composed new O Antiphons. The emergence of the Te Deum falls into this time.

As part of the rapid spread of Christianity, the individual archbishoprics and monasteries gained relative independence from Rome. Thus, in addition to the Ambrosian various other liturgies such as the Roman Rite, the Mozarabic Rite, the Gallican Rite, the Celtic Rite, the Byzantine Rite, the East and West Syriac Rites and the Alexandrian Rite. Many of these liturgies developed their own singing traditions, some of which are still alive today.

In the East, Romanos the Melodist was the most prominent hymnwriter of kontakion and the most prominent in the general akathist tradition, while Ephrem the Syrian was a notable Syriac hymnodist. An early musical notation was used in the Byzantine Empire for hymn writing.

== Middle Ages ==
=== Gregorian chant ===
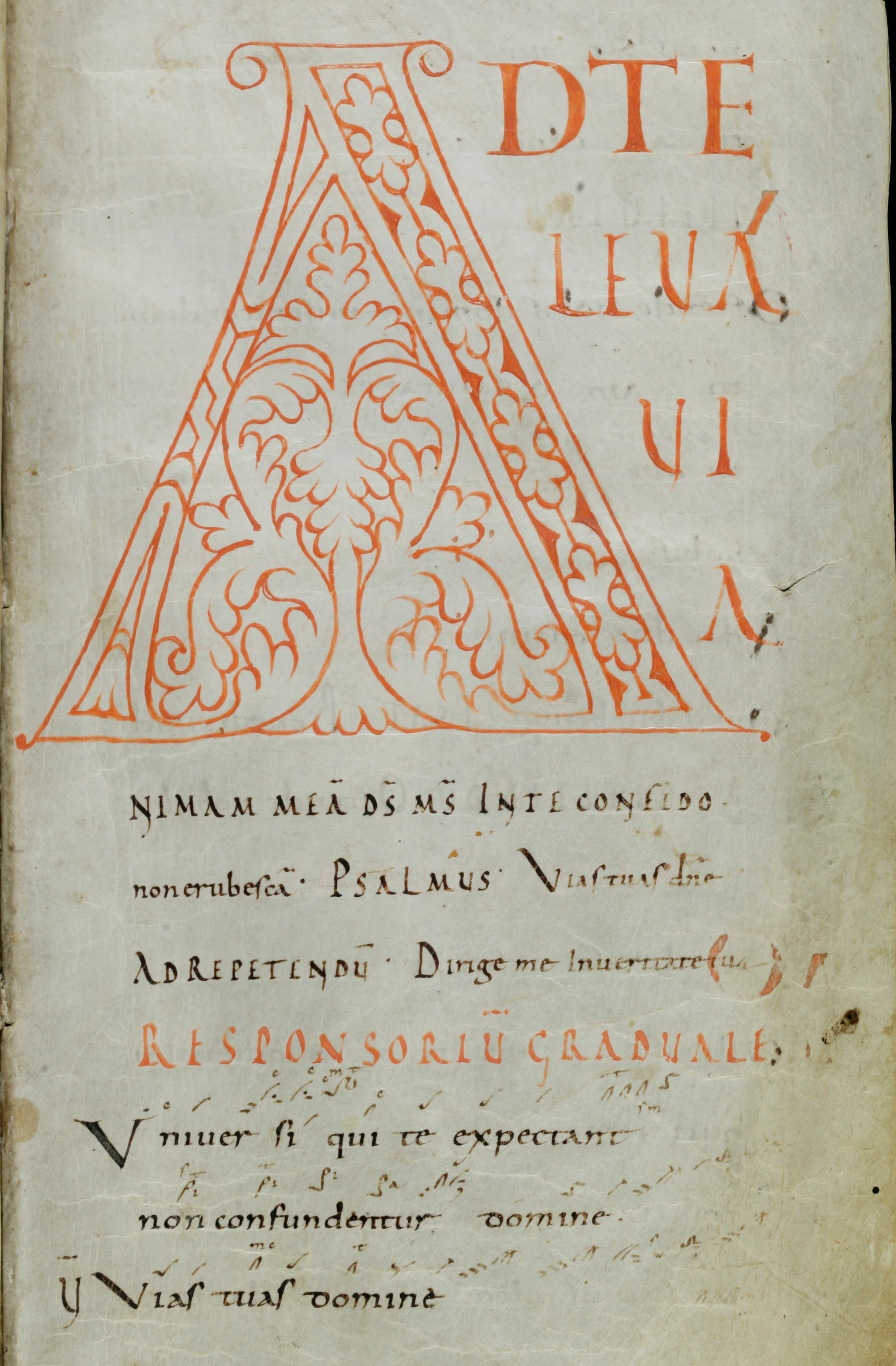
Two plainchants, written in adiastematic neumes

At the end of the 6th century, Pope Gregory I carried out a reform of the Roman liturgy. Presumably in the context of these reforms began over several hundred years continued order, collection and standardization of the melodies and texts used in the liturgy. The songs were compulsory as Gregorian chant for the Roman church and largely replaced local vocal styles.

In the style of the Gregorian chant emerged many new compositions that were increasingly melismatic. Their texts came from the Ordinary and the Proprium Missae, from antiphons for the worship service, and pieces from the Liturgy of the Hours.

=== Trope ===
In the Carolingian period, the officially sanctioned chorales developed various additions and modifications called tropes. They developed by the insertion or addition of new melismas or textual melody sections onto the existing tunes.

=== Sequence ===
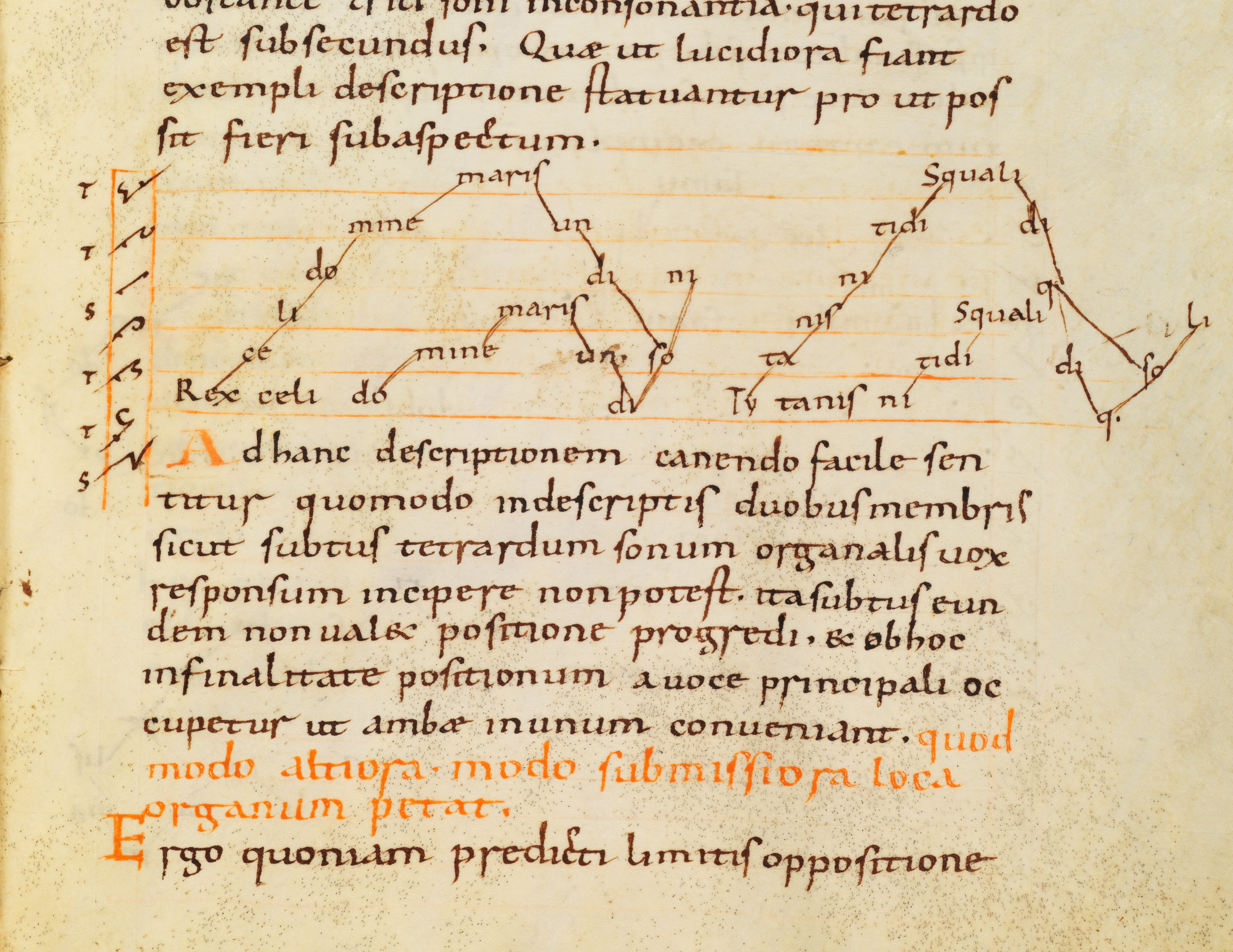
The Rex caeli sequence from the Bamberg Manuscript of the treatise Musica enchiriadis, (2nd half of the 9th century, Germany)

With the writing of the Alleluia final melismas ( classical sequence ), the history of the sequence begins around 850. Until the 12th century, the rhyme sequence, which is independent of the alleluia, emerges with the rhymes and rhythms. It leads to the large-scale stop rhythms of the 13th century (significant authors being Thomas of Celano and Thomas Aquinas). Rhyme sequences have the developed structure with multiple tropes, are metrically ordered, and rhyming. They were very popular in the late Middle Ages; there are about 5,000 rhyme sequences known. Although many were authored anonymously, notable sequence writers include Notker the Stammerer, Fulbert of Chartres, Hermann of Reichenau, and Adam of Saint Victor.

== Leise, carols, and vernacular hymnody ==
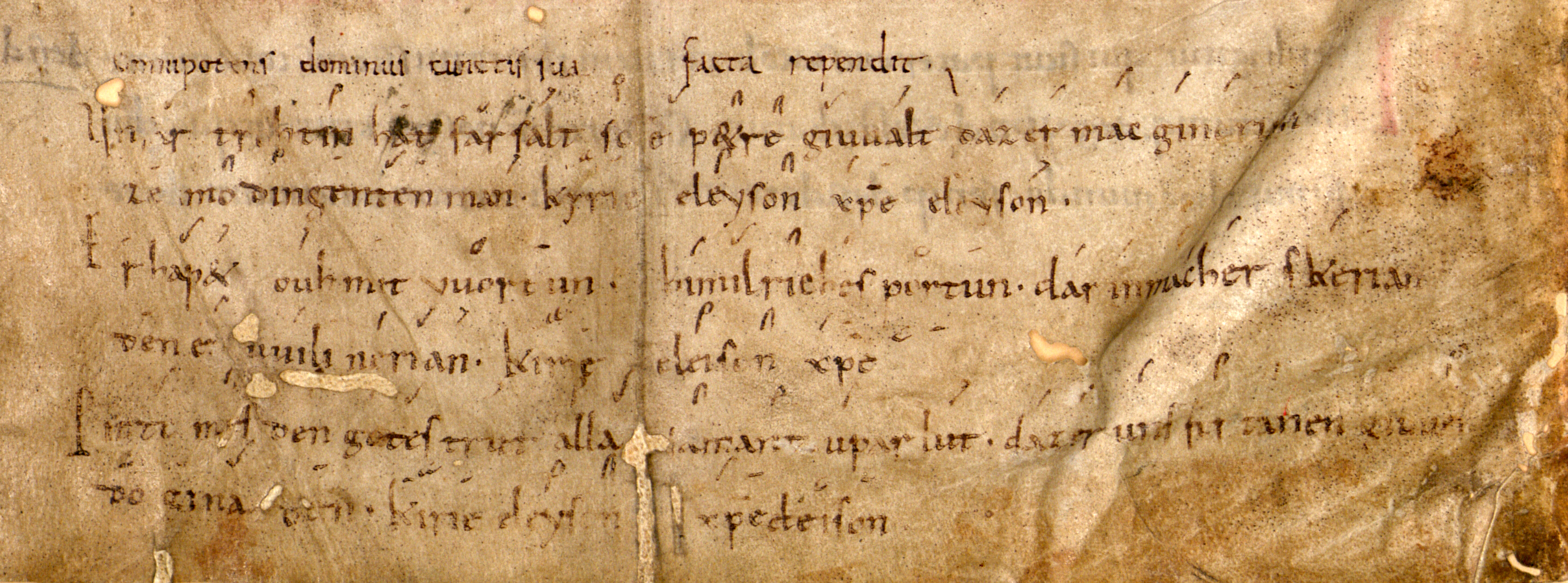
The oldest known manuscript of a leise, "Unsar trothîn hât farsalt", from the Petruslied

The first evidence of vernacular hymns from the Middle Ages comes from the leisen. The oldest known leise dates to c. 860. They were vernacular language (Germanic or Scandinavian) responses by the congregation to sung elements of the Latin Mass, especially sequences sung on feast days and also used during processionals and on pilgrimages. Leisen often consist of single stanzas which end in some form of the Kyrie eleison. Sometimes more than one stanza was used. As they were sung in the vernacular by the congregation, they were a precursor of Reformation-era church music.

With all the musical wealth of the Gregorian chant, a community participation in the liturgical song was at best tolerated. The more casual vernacular songs are termed spiritual songs and the more formal ones are called hymns. They were used at high festivals, processions or spiritual games.

Also, in the context of the Christmas games, carols using folk tunes or mixed-language reworking of Latin hymns and sequences like "In dulci jubilo" and the Quempas carol were sung. Musically, these hymns move between Gregorian chant and folk song (three-tone melody, three-bar), so that sometimes they should be considered spiritual folk songs rather than hymns or church music properly speaking.

Besides the vernacular songs based on ecclesiastical sources, the first uses of counterpoint were created, an example of the transmission of the development of music from secular songs into sacred music. Most of the time the melody was taken over and the text was reworked or rewritten. Another ninth-century development was the rhythmical office, and it was around this time in the East that idiomelon (a type of sticheron) began to be written down with musical notation.

== Reformation ==
=== Pre-Reformation ===
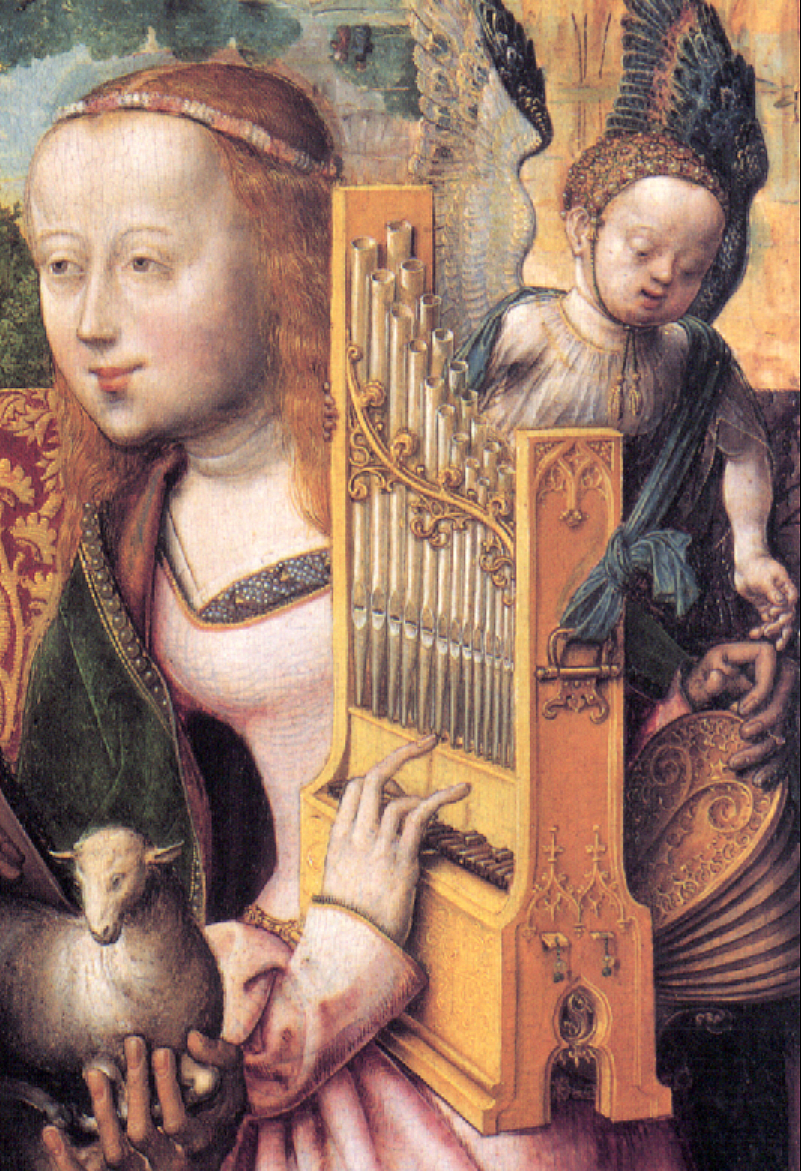
A depiction of Saint Cecilia playing a portative organ (cropped from the Altarpiece of the Holy Cross), painted around 1490 to 1495. The bellows can be seen to the right of the pipes.

Some churches by this time had pipe organs, but these were expensive. Other churches used a portative organ, or no organ at all. The Hungarian duda, a traditional bagpipe, was also used.

In the pre-Reformation period began to compile vernacular hymns in hymnals. One of the first hymnals appeared in 1501 with the Bohemian Brethren. It contained not only translations of Latin songs and contrafacts of Czech folk songs but also newly written songs.

Even shortly before Luther's day people began to print hymnals. Since then, the history of the hymn has been closely linked to the history of hymnals.

=== Martin Luther and his environment ===
Among the Protestant Reformers, Martin Luther in particular attributed great importance to the vernacular hymn. He aimed at various effects of singing hymns together in vernacular language:

- The songs promoted the spread of biblical content and reformatory ideas.
- Catechetical songs could be instructive and treat specific theological themes such as creed or sacraments.
- Formulated as a hymn that, with the help of a memorable melody, could easily be memorized, content was easier to memorize.
- Singing together represented common ground and formed a community.
- German songs enabled the hitherto essentially passive community to actively participate in the service.
- The spiritual effect of music was described by Luther as medicine against evil and despondency.

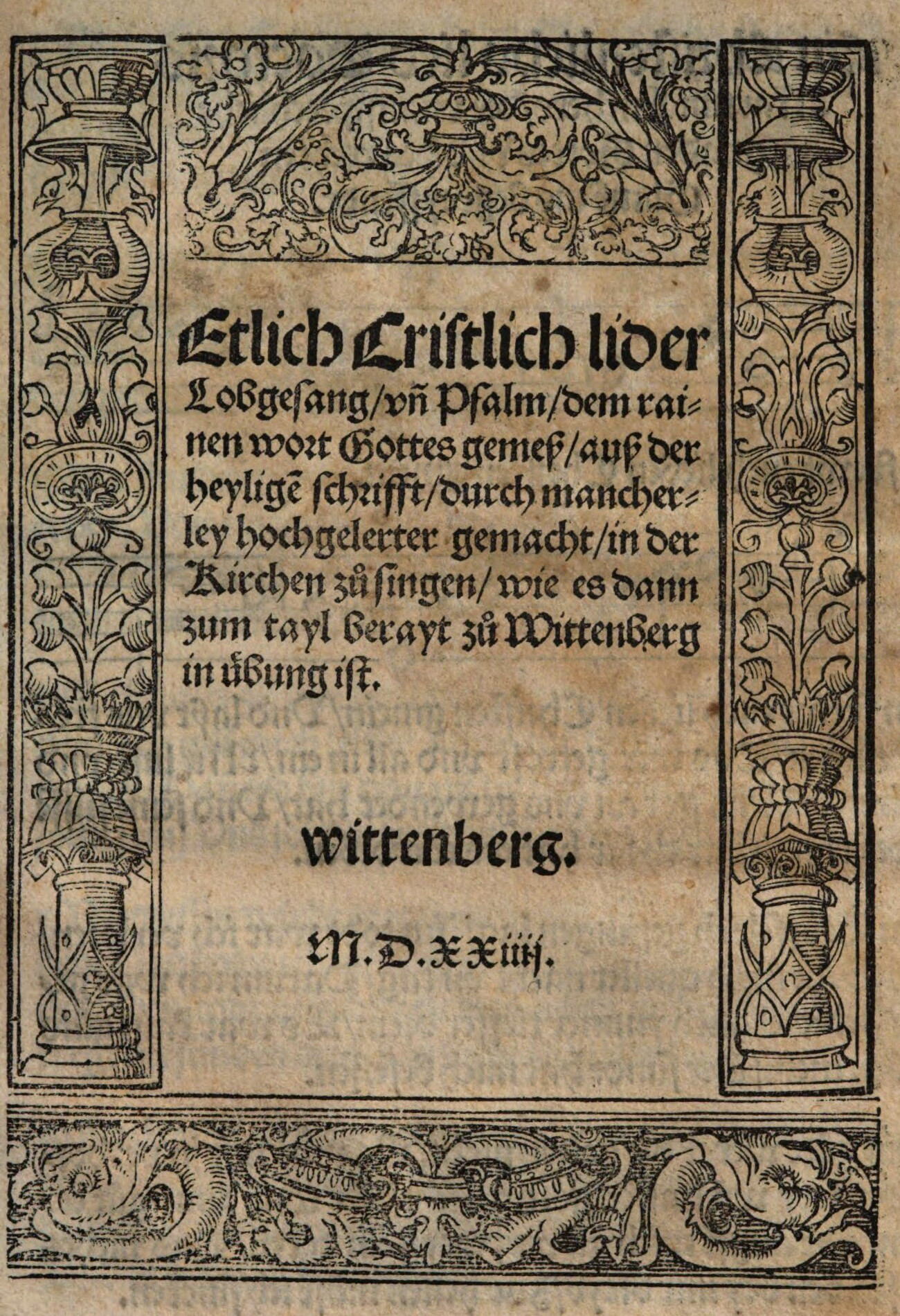
The title page to the First Lutheran hymnal, Wittenberg, 1523/24

Luther wrote over 30 hymns, including church year songs like "Vom Himmel hoch, da komm ich her" (From Heaven Above to Earth I Come)", catechism songs like "Mensch, willst du leben seliglich" (That Man a Godly Life Might Live)" and psalm songs like "Ein feste Burg ist unser Gott" (A Mighty Fortress Is Our God), as well as table songs in place of spoken prayers, songs for domestic use (morning blessing and evening blessings ) and liturgical songs. Many of these songs are in the second person plural and strengthen the early Reformation community.

Some of his hymns, such as "Gott sei gelobet und gebenedeiet" ("O Lord, We Praise Thee"), "Nun bitten wir den Heiligen Geist" ("We Now Implore God the Holy Ghost"), "Christ ist erstanden" ("Christ the Lord is Risen Again"), and "Mitten wir im Leben sind" ("In Midst of Earthly Life") were based on a medieval leise, which Luther reworked and expanded.

Luther also adopted several Gregorian chants and gave them new German texts. With new melodies the singularity always stood in the foreground; often the melodies move in familiar formulas – artistic originality of the melody was of little importance. New melodies were mostly written in collaboration with Johann Walter. Luther also asked other co-workers for support in creating new hymns.

The songs of Luther and his environment were printed on leaflets. They spread widely and quickly became popular. They formed a pillar of the worship orders: In Lutheran worship, the hymn is an active participation of the church and also may correspond to the sermon as in the hymn of the day.

=== Reformed Church ===
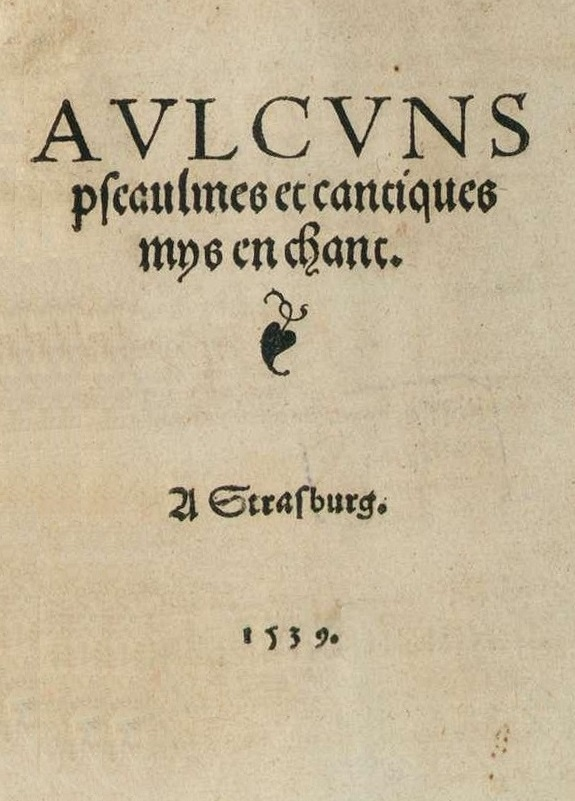
Title page of the 1539 Psalter, published in Strasburg when Calvin was a minister there. Calvin's psalters were called "Genevan" due to later editions after Calvin moved to Geneva.

John Calvin rejected all traditions that he did not see justified in the Bible. Unlike Luther, he was initially dismissive of church music. In Calvinist liturgies, the spoken word had priority.

Although being very musical, Zwingli rejected music in worship for a long time. In the Reformed communities of Zürich, there were no songs in his time. Instrumental music was also excluded.

Calvin, who took over the leadership of the Reformed Church after Zwingli's death, had encountered psalm singing in Strasbourg. He put communal singing again under strict musical and lyrical conditions, now called exclusive psalmody:

- Only psalm texts were allowed to be sung. Versified psalms had to lean closely on the biblical text.
- The singing had to be unanimous.
- The tunes were not allowed to exceed the size of an octave.
- Melismas were not allowed.
- Only two basic values were allowed for the rhythm (one beat and two beats, quarter note and half note in today's notation). Rhythmic reassurance at the end of lines was desired.
- Every line had to be paused.

In this framework, a series of psalm songs emerged, with simple melodies that usually avoided jumps (example: get up in your power, God ). The central hymnbook of the Reformed Church was the Genevan Psalter, whose final (French) edition appeared in 1562. After Calvin's death, the four-part ballad was allowed, and with the simple four-part choral movements by Claude Goudimel, the Geneva Psalter reached a wide spread in the Reformed churches. Sigmund Hemmel set to music in the Württemberg Reformation, first around 1560 the entire Psalter for four voices in German psalm seals of various authors. The translation of Ambrosius Lobwasser soon became for over two hundred years the authoritative hymnbook of the Reformed communities in Germany.

Hymn boards were used to help people keep track of which page to use in the hymnal, with the earliest documentation of them coming from 1550 in Geneva.

=== Anabaptists ===
Even Thomas Müntzer, who had introduced a reformatory German-language liturgy before Luther, wrote new hymns. Müntzer relied mainly on well-known Gregorian melodies, which he translated into German. Some of his songs, such as his translation of the Latin Conditor alme siderum can be found today in both Catholic and Protestant hymnals.

In the context of the Radical Reformation movement, new hymns were created. Particularly noteworthy is the first printed in 1564 Anabaptist hymn book Ausbund, which was used until the 19th century in southern German Mennonites and even today in the Amish in North America. The core of the hymn book was 51 songs whose authorship is unknown save that they were all written between 1535 and 1540 by Anabaptists in the dungeon of the Veste Oberhaus castle. They were mostly sung to folk melodies. Also popular was Das schön Gesangbüchlein from 1565, which contained 122 songs. Known Anabaptist songwriters include Felix Manz, one of the co-founders of the first Anabaptist church in 1525, as well as Michael Sattler, Hans Hut, Leonhard Schiemer and George Blaurock. Some churches of Anabaptist heritage today still practice the lining out of hymns.

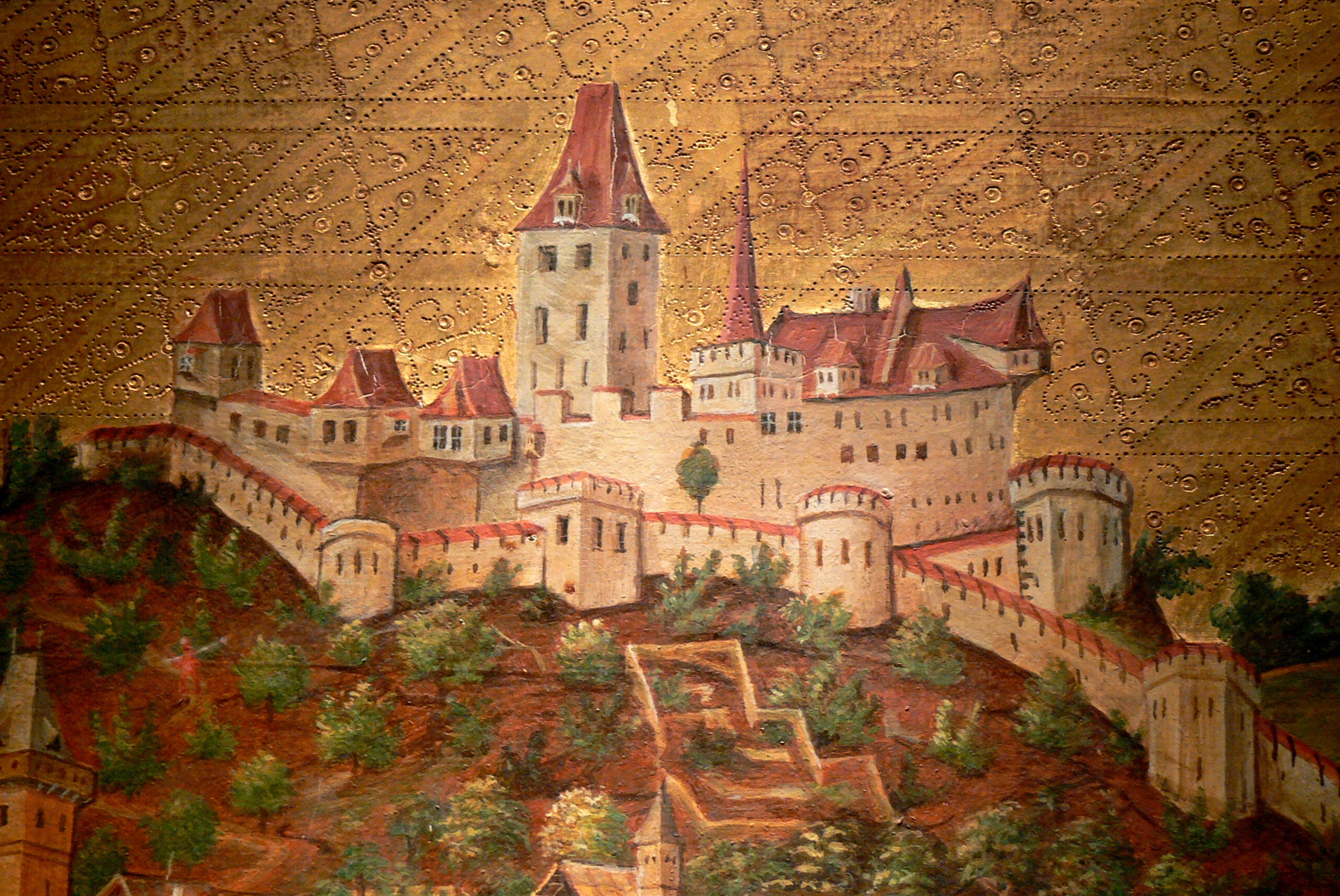
14th century painting of the Veste Oberhaus castle

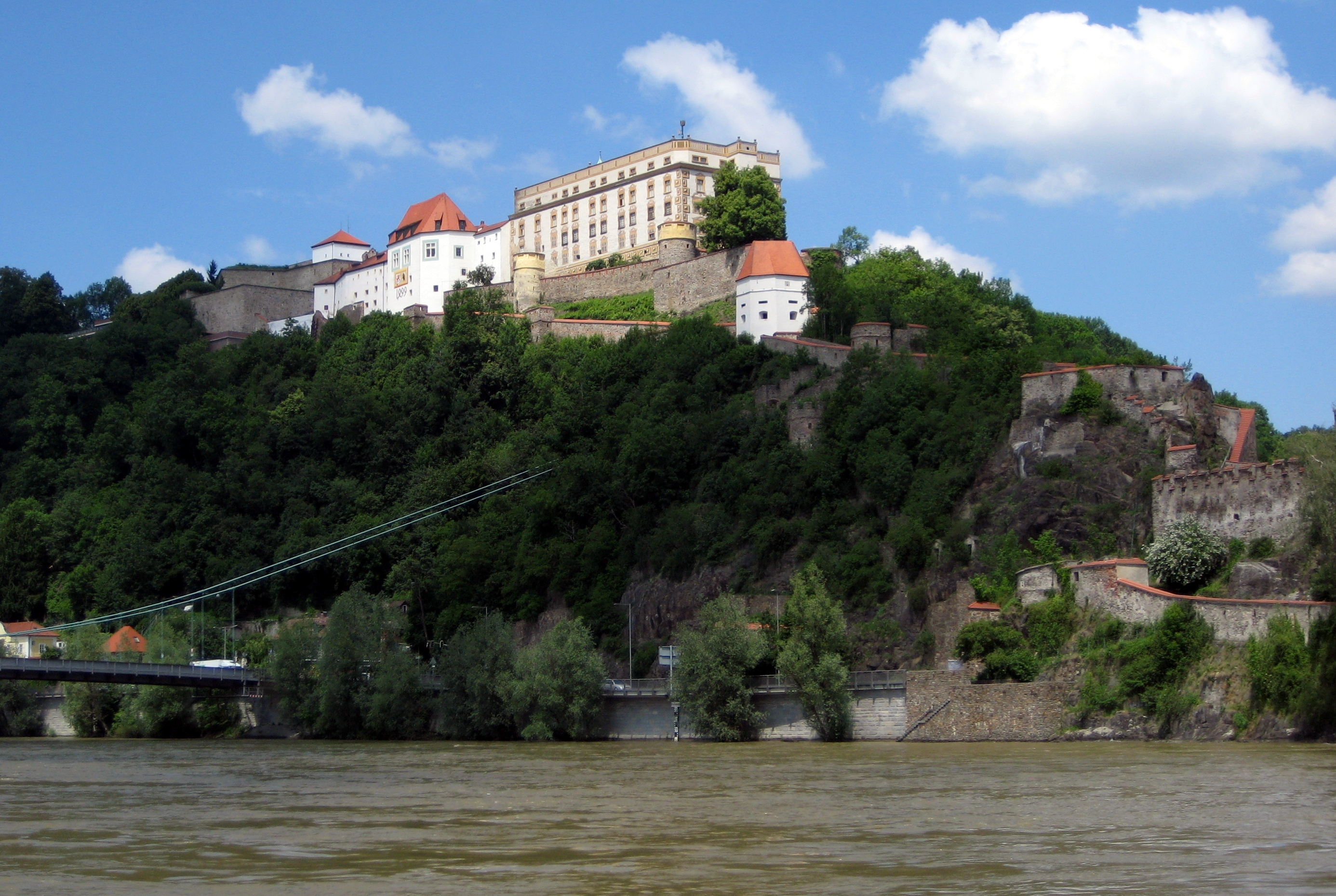
Veste Oberhaus today

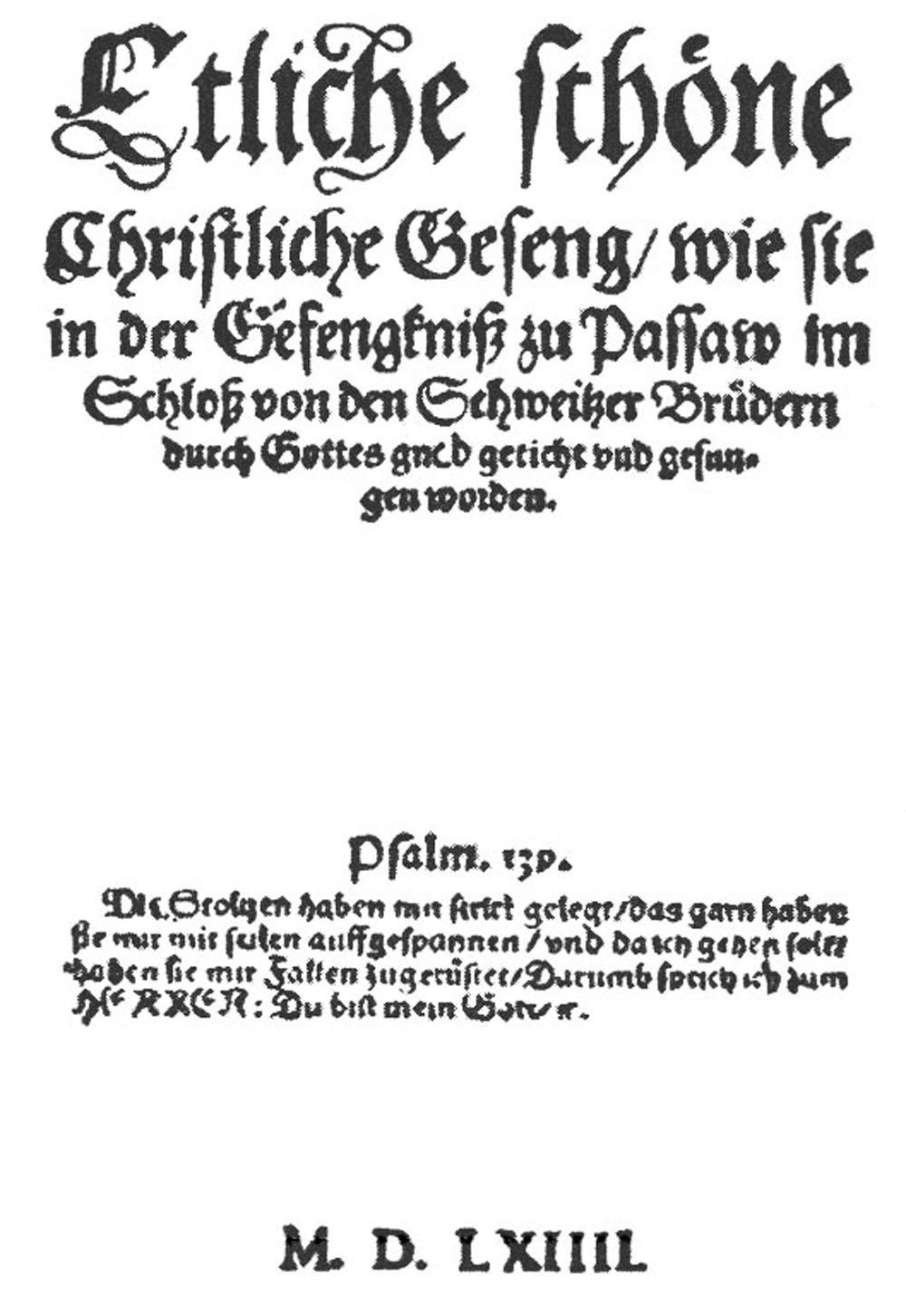
Ausbund title page

== Lutheran Orthodoxy and the Counter-Reformation ==
The time after the death of Luther ( 1546 ) was characterized by a period of theological controversies which were resolved in the 1577 Formula of Concord. This reconsolidation of theology was also reflected in the hymn texts.

In addition to a regulation of figural music, the Council of Trent (1545–1563) also gave instructions for the Gregorian chant. Thus, only four of the sequences of the late Middle Ages were admitted in the official Roman liturgy.

The Counter-Reformation also recognized the importance of the vernacular hymn. Catholic hymnbooks such as that of Nikolaus Beuttner (Graz, 1602) – a collection of mainly pre-Reformation religious folk songs and pilgrimage – and David Gregor Corner (Nuremberg, 1625) are early examples of the work of Catholic, Jesuit educated scholars in Reformation regions and the use of the Hymn as an instrument of re-catholization. In particular, the hymnal by Beuttner included the hymn "Unser lieben Frauen Traum" that is still played today.

The 17th century brought a new vivacity and a new level of German poetry, which also included the hymn. Martin Opitz set up laws for German poetry in his Buch von der Deutschen Poeterey in 1624, which were widely adopted by German speaking hymn writers during following hundred years:

- strict attention to metering, taking into account the natural word accent,
- Prohibition of unclean rhymes,
- Prohibition of word shortening and contractions,
- Exclusion of foreign words.

One important themes in hymns at the time of the Thirty Years' War was the juxtaposition of transience and eternity. Numerous passion, death, crucifixion and death songs were created which are still in use today. In contrast to earlier songs, the emphasis is not on the retelling of biblical content or the teaching of teachings, but on subjective considerations. For example, the hymn may discuss the passion or human life in general. The second person plural perspective of the Reformation shifts into a first person perspective. Some poets wrote edifying literature or were influenced by Christian mysticism.

During this time, the regal organ began to replace the portative organ for use in worship. Organs were used to find pitch earlier on and as improved organs became available they were used to accompany hymns as well. Still, organ use varied by location and could be controversial.

An important hymnal of this time was Praxis pietatis melica. The outstanding hymn writer of the time is Paul Gerhardt (1607–1676). His songs, to a large extent devotional in character, are still sung today in the services of various denominations and have been translated into numerous languages. In particular, his translation of "O Sacred Head, Now Wounded" made him the first Protestant to be included in a Catholic hymnal. Next to Paul Gerhardt are Johann Heermann (1585–1647), Martin Rinckart (1586–1649) who wrote "Nun danket alle Gott", Johann Rist (1607–1667), Paul Fleming (1609–1640) and Georg Neumark (1621–1681), who wrote "Wer nur den lieben Gott läßt walten".

In the musical field, with the transition to the baroque, the church modes are increasingly taking a back seat. The municipality song begins to assume a chordal accompaniment and becomes the basso song can. Thus new, freer melodic twists in the context of the major-minor tonality are possible. Other new elements included derivative harmonization, change notes, and leittöne. Scope and vocal demand of the songs grow, the distinction of the church song against the (spiritual) solo song blurs. There is a rich production of new song tunes.

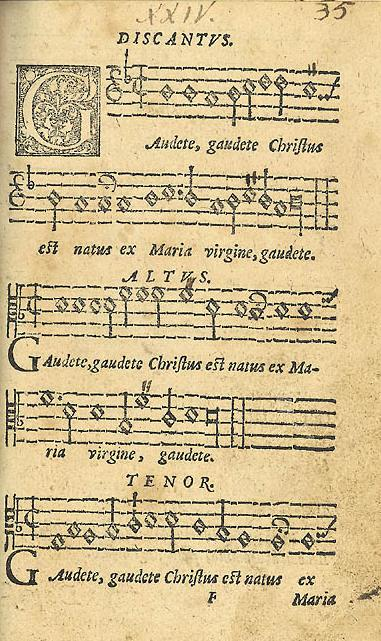
The first page of "Gaudete" (Latin for "rejoice"), a sacred Christmas carol published in Piae Cantiones (1582). This songbook had mostly religious songs, some which were mixed language with both Latin and Swedish.

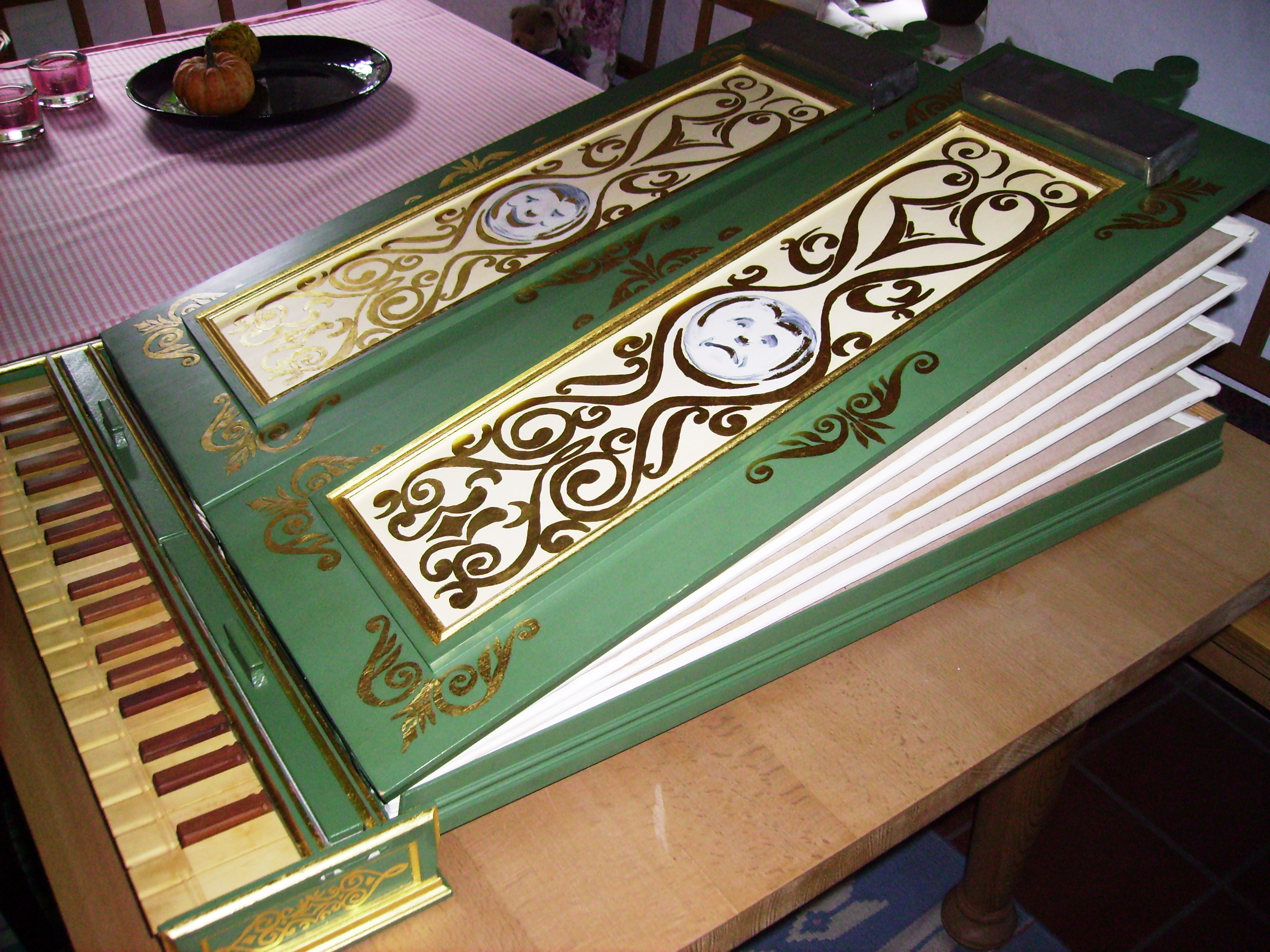
Regal organ made in 1988 based on an instrument made c. 1600. From the Germanisches Nationalmuseum.

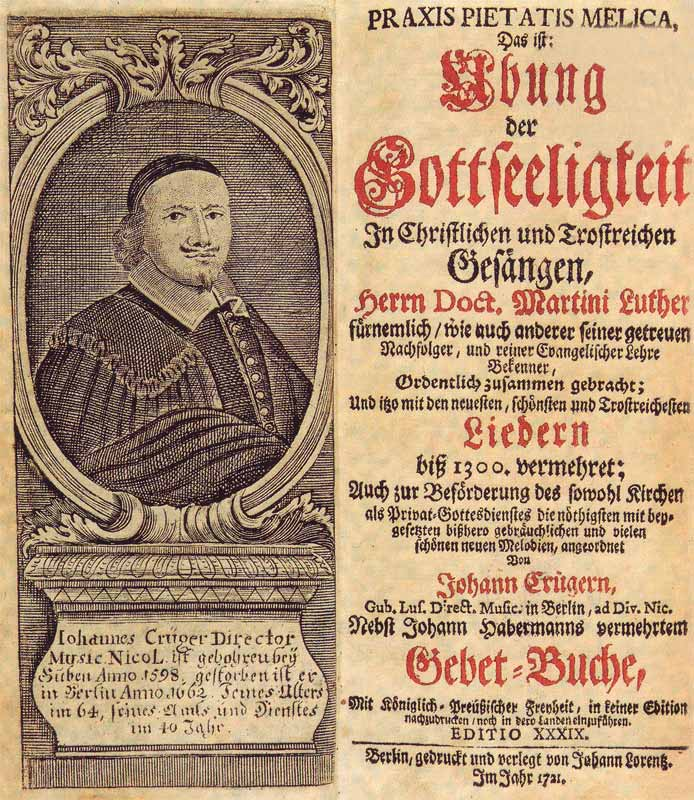
Praxis pietatis melica, Title page of the 39th edition, 1721

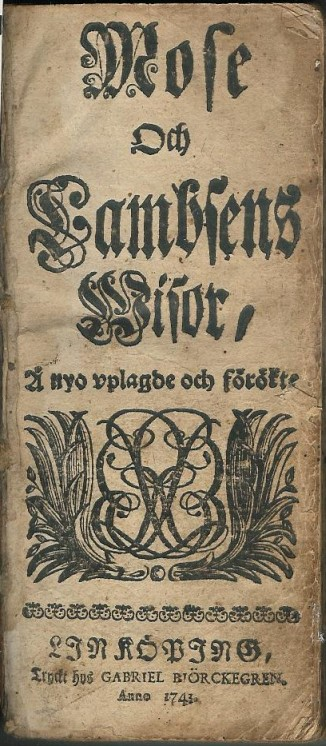
Title page of the 1743 Mose och Lambsens wisor.This edition had 136 hymns, which were not numbered, although most had instructions as to which melody the text should be sung. (Note: For a complete list of hymns, see the Swedish article on Mose och Lambsens wisor. The title is a reference to Revelation 15:3, where those who triumph over the beast sing the songs of Moses and the Lamb.)

== Pietism ==
From about 1670, Pietism became the dominant flow of German-language hymn literature.

Pietism began as an intra-church reform movement, which wanted to break the rationalization of theology, perceived as paralyzed ( from the head to the heart ) and opposed it to a practice of faith based on personal conversion and emotional piety. Philipp Spener published his 1675 Pia desideria. After official rejection, Pietism quickly found its place in private homes, where the pietistic hymn was of central importance.

The new songs were mostly subjective in emphasis, characterized by linguistic images in which descriptions of personal feelings stood foremost and in front of clear theological expression. Expressions of love from the believing soul to her bridegroom or the Lamb Jesus Christ, exaggerated expressions of feeling underlined by interjections such as "Oh" and the rejection of the world as a "vale of tears" were familiar contents. In addition, militant-missionary songs were created, which called for a new, conscious conversion. On the whole the literary quality sank as eventually these songs all started to sound the same.

The most productive poet of pietistic hymns was Nikolaus Ludwig von Zinzendorf; he wrote about 3000 songs. The Reformed Joachim Neander ("Lobe den Herren, den mächtigen König der Ehren") and the Reformed mystic Gerhard Tersteegen ("Ich bete an die Macht der Liebe") wrote many hymns that are still popular today. The most important hymn book of Pietism was the Freylinghausen hymnal published in Halle in 1704, which contained about 1,500 songs in two volumes.

Pietism was of great importance to hymn writing until the end of the eighteenth century.

Musically, in the high and late Baroque many valuable, heartfelt hymn tunes were composed. The three-quarter clock gained in importance. At the same time stereotypical, undemanding melodies were created which seem overly utilitarian. The combined relationship between the text and tune of the hymn lost importance as melodies were increasingly used several times for different texts or texts associated with other melodies. As a result, the overall fit between text and tune could not be as precise.

During this time, people started smoothing out the strictly metered rhythmic hymn tunes to produce to isorhythmic versions. These hymns had uniform note lengths.

== Rationalism ==
From about 1730, the Age of Enlightenment, which understood critical reason as the supreme principle and rejected every belief in revelation and miracles, became decisive for the theology and practice of the official churches in German-speaking countries. The rationalism presented Biblical teachings often behind the rational interpretations back, and in the Protestant Enlightenment theology, reason finally was regarded as the highest judge in matters of faith. Central contents, such as the Lutheran doctrine of justification, were called into question. The liturgy was considered irrational, especially in the Protestant churches, which was accompanied by a decline of church music.

The passage of the liturgy was filled by the sermon, according to the pedagogical concerns of the Enlightenment understood as a guide to a virtuous life. Core values such as tolerance, freedom of conscience and charity were central themes. God was portrayed as the loving Father and initial Creator whose world is now moving according to their own laws; Christ has been reduced to a role as a wise virtue teacher.

The hymn should lead to such sermons during worship or underline their contents. So many existing songs were no longer acceptable due to their textual content and were revised according to rationalistic standards of value, sometimes profoundly changed. In addition, numerous new creations, mostly of a very instructive character, whose contents corresponded to the sermons. In front of the textual content, the poetic content became irrelevant – the songs contained only a few pictures and looked very sober. As of 2004 only some of these rationalistic church lyrics are sung in Germany, including the poetry of the Enlightenment theologian Christian Fürchtegott Gellert (1715–1769). The best known of his hymns is "Die Ehre Gottes aus der Natur".

The musical arrangement of the hymns also lost much importance. The number of popular melodies to which new and old texts were sung sank rapidly. These tunes were mostly Isorhythmically reshaped and sung by the community in increasingly long-stretched tones. The songs were interrupted by organ interludes at the end of the choral line.

The design of new hymn tunes was no longer understood as artistically demanding; Thus, the newly created melodies have no rhythmic variety, and they often lack melodic momentum. Partly new melodies are in musical proximity to the classical music, for example with Franz Anton Hoffmeister (1754–1812), in his "Zu lernen bleibt noch unsern Seelen viel".

In rationalism appeared a number of new hymn books, for example, the Cramersches Gesangbuch. Due to the low number of melodies used, hymnbooks were now usually published without music.

Matthias Jorissen's Neue Bereimung der Psalmen, published in 1798, replaced the psalm settings of Ambrosius Lobwasser in the German-speaking Reformed churches.

== Mediating between Pietism and Rationalism ==
Some German-speaking hymn writers of the 18th and early 19th centuries attempted to mediate between the polarization of pietism and mysticism on the one hand and rationalism on the other. These include Friedrich Gottlieb Klopstock (1724–1803), who wrote "Die ihr Christi Jünger seid" and "Herr, du wollst uns vorbereiten" and Matthias Claudius, writer of the poem "Wir pflügen und wir streuen" which was translated as the Thanksgiving hymn "We Plough the Fields and Scatter". His popular poetry expressed a simple Biblical faith that was deeply rooted in God.

Also during this time, some laity saved and used old hymnals from the orthodox period.

== 19th century ==
=== Text development ===
The development of the hymn text in the 19th century is characterized by counter-movements against rationalism. The determining currents include various revival movements and their revival theology and German Romanticism. Neo-Lutheranism and Confessional Lutheranism also influenced the hymn texts of the 19th century. Danish revivalist N. F. S. Grundtvig wrote or translated about 1,500 hymns, including "God's Word Is Our Great Heritage".

==== German revival movement ====
Today lyrics from the 19th century are to a great extent derived from Protestant theologians or clerics from the context of various German revivalist movements. These include the contributions of hymn writers Friedrich August Tholuck (1799–1877) who wrote "Das sei alle meine Tage", Philipp Spitta (1801–1859) who wrote "Bei dir, Jesus, will ich bleiben", and the pastor's wife Marie Schmalenbach (1835–1924) who wrote "Brich herein, süßer Schein". In addition, melodies were written by Michael Haydn, Johannes Kuhlo, Andreas Sulger, and Johann Georg Christian Störl.

Christian Gottlob Barth (1799–1862) and Albert Knapp (1798–1864) were notable Wuerttemberg pietist writers.

A Reformed hymn writer was Friedrich Adolf Krummacher (1767–1845).

==== Occasional works and other poets ====
Some outstanding German literary figures and publicists of the 19th century have written individual sacred texts, which represent only a small part of a much larger work. The songs of Ernst Moritz Arndt (1769–1860), Friedrich Rückert (1788–1866), and Eleonore Princess of Reuss (1835–1903) are examples.

=== Song melodies ===
New lyrics of the 19th century were often sung on choral melodies, which were already known to Germans, such as on the tune to "Wake, Awake, for Night Is Flying".

New song melodies of the 19th century come from

- Hans Georg Nägeli (1773–1836) ("Lobt froh den Herrn")
- Karl Friedrich Schulz (1784–1850) (Danket dem Herrn")
- César Malan (1787–1864) (Harre, meine Seele", text by Johann Friedrich Räder)
- Gottlob Siegert (1789–1868) ("Du lieber, heil'ger, frommer Christ")
- Friedrich Silcher (1789–1860) ("So nimm denn meine Hände")
- Franz Xaver Gruber (1787–1863) ("Stille Nacht")
- Karl Friedrich Ellwanger (1796–1856) ("Ich will dich immer treuer lieben")
- Julius Karl Hermann Grobe (1807–1877) ("Mit dem Herrn fang alles an")
- Friedrich August Schulz (1810–1880) ("Wie ein Hirt, sein Volk zu weiden")
- Friedrich Wilhelm Stade (1817–1902) ("Ach komm, füll unsre Seelen ganz")
- Karl Kuhlo (1818–1909) ("Brich herein, süßer Schein", text by Marie Schmalenbach, "Sei uns tausendmal willkommen", "Sieh, ich breite voll Verlangen")
- Franz Abt (1819–1885) ("Freut euch, ihr Christen")
- Jakob Heinrich Lützel (1823–1899) ("Zwei Hände wollen heute sich")
- Karl Voigtländer (1827–1858) ("Vor meines Herzens König", "Laßt mich gehn")
- John Baccus van Dykes (1832–1876) ("Weiß ich den Weg auch nicht")
- Mina Koch (1845–1924) ("Stern, auf den ich schaue")
- Friedrich Linde (1864–1933) ("Wann schlägt die Stunde")
- Fritz Liebich (1873–1958) ("Reicht euch die Hände")

=== Translations from English into German ===
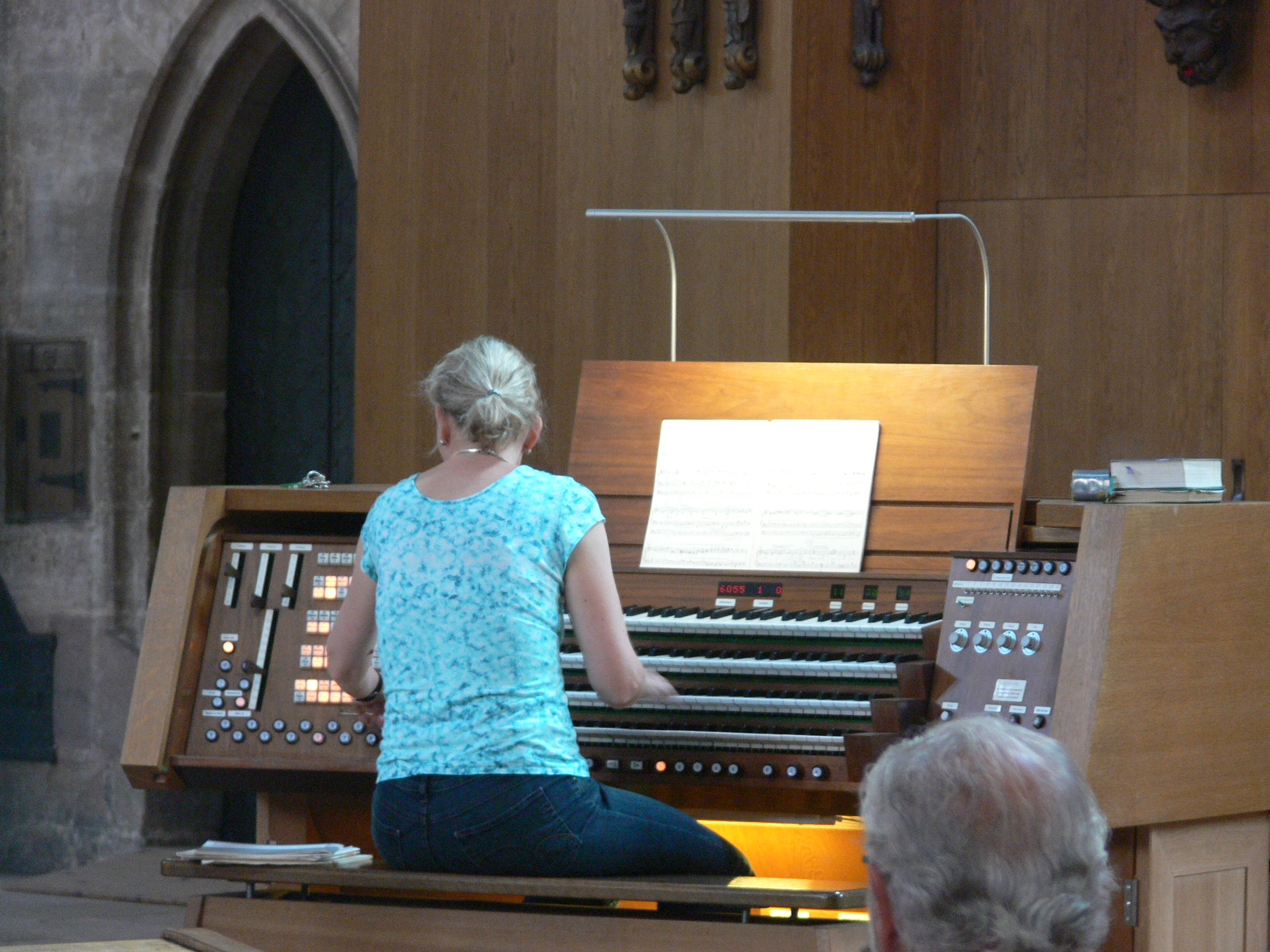
Organist at St. Sebaldus Church, Nuremberg, 2014

In addition more songs have been translated into German from English, especially gospel songs from the American revival movement and from Baptist or Methodist hymn writers.

Hymn translators have often written their own lyrics. Translated lyrics inspired German-speaking authors to stylistically similar re-creations. German-speaking Baptists contributed to the spread of gospel songs in Europe.

Important translators of hymns into German were:

- Erhard Friedrich Wunderlich (1830–1895) (translated "Näher mein Gott zu dir" after "Nearer, My God, to Thee" by Sarah Flower Adams)
- Ernst Heinrich Gebhardt (1832–1899) (translated "Herr hier bring ich mein alles" for a text by Mary Dagworthy James, "Herrliches, liebliches Zion" after a text by William Orcutt Cushing, "Ich brauch dich alle Zeit" after "I Need Thee Every Hour" by Annie Hawks, "Welch ein Freund ist unser Jesus" according to "What a Friend We Have in Jesus" by Joseph Medlicott Scriven ), also rewrote many songs and also composed melodies inspired by the gospel songs ("Herr dir bring ich mein alles", "Lasst die Herzen immer fröhlich")
- Theodor Kübler (1832–1905), translated many English language revival songs by Philip Paul Bliss ("Zu des Heilands Füßen"), Horatius Bonar ("Frisch von dem Thron des Lammes") and Horatio Spafford ("Wenn Friede mit Gott"), also wrote his own songs ("Mir ward in bangen Sorgen ein Trostquell aufgetan")
- Dora Rappard (1842–1923) (Translated from English, also composed and composed songs of her own like "Es harrt die Braut so lange schon")
- Johanna Meyer (1851–1921) translated many English lyrics, for example by Edmond Louis Budry, Frances Ridley Havergal
- Heinrich Rickers (1863–1928) (translated "Blessed Knowledge" into "Blessed Assurance" by Fanny Crosby)

Baptist and Methodist hymn writers influential in German hymnody include Philip Bickel (1829–1914) ("Reicht euch die Hände, die Stunde zerrinnen," melody by Fritz Liebig) and Hans Jakob Breiter (1845–1893) ("Daheim, o welch ein schönes Wort" and "Eine Botschaft voll Erbarmen").

== 20th century ==
In the 20th century, Jochen Klepper and Dietrich Bonhoeffer shared their experiences of intellectual resistance to fascism.

At the turn of the millennium, new sacred songs in the style of praise and worship have gained popularity.

== Literature ==
- Albrecht, Christoph: Einführung in die Hymnologie. Berlin (East) 1973, ISBN 3-374-00175-0.
- Blank, Benuel S. The Amazing Story of the Ausbund. Carlisle Printing: Sugar Creek, OH, 2001. ISBN 978-0-9714539-1-3, 120-page book by ordained Old Order Amish writer.
- Brown, Christopher Boyd (2005). Singing the Gospel: Lutheran Hymns and the Success of the Reformation. Harvard University Press. ISBN 978-0-674-01705-4.
- Bürki, Bruno (2003). "Reformed Worship in Continental Europe in the Seventeenth Century". In Vischer, Lukas (ed.). Christian Worship in Reformed Churches Past and Present. Calvin Institute of Christian Worship Liturgical Studies. Cambridge: Wm. B. Eerdmans Publishing Company. ISBN 978-0802805201.
- McKee, Elsie Anne (2003). "Reformed Worship in the Sixteenth Century". In Vischer, Lukas (ed.). Christian Worship in Reformed Churches Past and Present. Calvin Institute of Christian Worship Liturgical Studies. Cambridge: Wm. B. Eerdmans Publishing Company. ISBN 978-0802805201.
- Old, Hughes Oliphant (2002). Worship. Louisville, KY: Westminster John Knox Press. ISBN 978-0664225797.
- White, James F. (1989). Protestant Worship. Louisville, KY: Westminster/John Knox Press. ISBN 978-0664250379.
- Trocmé-Latter, Daniel (2015). The Singing of the Strasbourg Protestants, 1523-1541. Farnham: Ashgate. ISBN 978-1472432063.
- Barber, John (June 25, 2006). "Luther and Calvin on Music and Worship". Reformed Perspectives Magazine. 8 (26).
- Frame, John. "A Fresh Look at the Regulative Principle". Third Millennium Ministries.
- Frame, John (August 2006). "The Doctrine of the Christian Life: Regulating worship". Reformed Perspectives Magazine. 8 (32). Archived from the original on September 27, 2007.
- Frame, John (1992). "Some Questions About The Regulative Principle". Westminster Theological Journal. 54 (2): 357–66. ISSN 0043-4388.
- Frame, John and Darryl Hart (1998). "The Regulative Principle: Scripture, Tradition, and Culture (a written debate)".
- Gordon, T. David (1993). "Some Answers about the Regulative Principle". Westminster Theological Journal. 55 (2): 321–29.
- Gordon, T. David. "Nine Lines of Argument in Favor of the Regulative Principle of Worship".
- Herl, Joseph (2004). Worship Wars in Early Lutheranism: Choir, Congregation, and Three Centuries of Conflict. Oxford University Press. ISBN 978-0-19-534830-9.
- Johnson, Terry L. (2000). Reformed Worship: Worship that Is According to Scripture. Greenville, SC: Reformed Academic Press. ISBN 1-884416-33-0.
- Kleinig, Vernon P. Lutheran Liturgies from Martin Luther to Wilhelm Löhe, Concordia Theological Quarterly, April 1998
- Kraeuter, Tom. "An Honest Look at the Regulative Principle of Worship". Training Resources. Archived from the original on 2008-05-09.
- Leaver, Robin (2007). Luther's Liturgical Music. Wm. B. Eerdmans Publishing. pp. 135–141. ISBN 978-0-8028-3221-4.
- McMahon, C. Matthew. "The Regulative Principle in Worship: A brief article". A Puritan's Mind. Archived from the original on 2008-06-10.
- Pless, John T. "Six Theses on Liturgy and Evangelism," (Conference on Liturgy and Outreach, Concordia College, 1987)
- Pratt, Richard. "The Regulative Principle". Third Millennium Ministries.
- Schwertley, Brian M. (2000). Pribble, Stephen (ed.). Sola Scriptura and the Regulative Principle of Worship. Southfield, MI: Reformed Witness. OCLC 45414021.
- Schwertley, Brian M. (1999). Musical Instruments in the Public Worship of God. Southfield, MI: Reformed Witness. OCLC 41962530.
- Thornwell, James Henley (1841). "Argument Against Church-Boards". Collected Writings. Vol. 4.
- Thornwell, James Henley (1842). "The Argument For Church Boards Answered". Collected Writings. Vol. 4.
- Williamson, G. I. "The Scriptural Basis for the Regulative Principle of Worship" (PDF). Archived from the original (PDF) on July 25, 2011.

== See also ==
- Hymn tune § History
- Hymn § Christian hymnody
- Hymnology
- Lutheran hymn
- Lutheran chorale
- Anglican church music § History
