= Nun bitten wir den Heiligen Geist =

Christian song by Martin Luther

- Hymn by Martin Luther
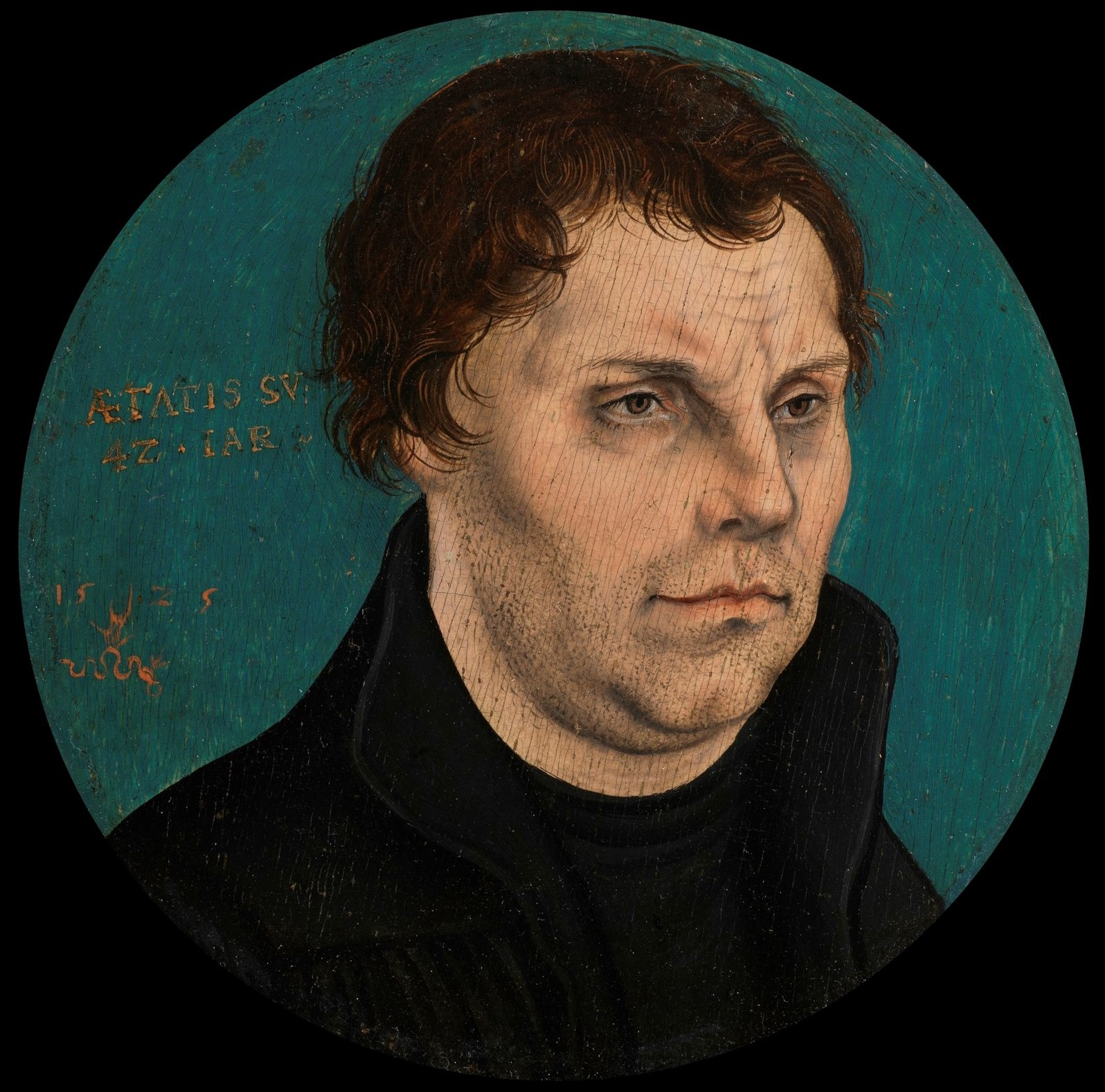
- Portrait of Luther, 1525
- English: "We now implore the Holy Ghost"
- Catalogue: Zahn 2029a
- Language: German
- Based on: Chant
- Meter: 9.9.11.10.4
- Published: 1524

"Nun bitten wir den Heiligen Geist" ("We now implore the Holy Ghost") is the title of several hymns in German. The first is one of the oldest hymns in the German language: a 13th-century leise. Subsequent versions expanded upon the leise; the original hymn became the new version's first stanza, and it now used melodies derived from its medieval tune. The Protestant reformer Martin Luther expanded the leise in 1524, and different Catholic versions were published between 1537 and 1975.

The text of the original 13th-century leise alludes to the Latin sequence for Pentecost, Veni Sancte Spiritus (translated as "Come, Holy Spirit"). The leise was widely known and performed, especially as a song sung when someone was dying, during a procession, and in sacred plays.

The leise contained an appeal for the right faith which especially suited Luther's theology; he wrote three additional stanzas, first published in Wittenberg in 1547 as part of Johann Walter's choral songbook Eyn geystlich Gesangk Buchleyn. His version's themes of faith, love and hope made the hymn appropriate for general occasions and funerals.

Alternate versions of the hymn have appeared in Catholic hymnals, countering the Reformation, first in 1537 in a collection published by Michael Vehe. Over the following centuries, Protestant versions remained in use, adapted to changes in religion and philosophy, but restored to Luther's version by the 19th century's restoration of chorales. Catholic use was discontinued after the Baroque period, but the hymn reappeared in a modified version in Heinrich Bone's Cantate! hymnal in 1847. It became used more after the 1938 collection Kirchenlied included it in a version based on Vehe's. Maria Luise Thurmair wrote three stanzas for the 1975 Gotteslob which appeared combined with one stanza from the Vehe version.

Luther's chorale is sung by several Christian denominations in different languages, having received various English translations. It has inspired vocal and organ music from the Renaissance to contemporary by composers such as Johann Crüger, Johann Sebastian Bach, Hugo Distler and Ernst Pepping.

== Medieval leise ==
Initially, "Nun bitten wir den Heiligen Geist" was a medieval leise. During Latin Catholic masses, congregations typically alternated leises in their native languages with a priest's Kyrie in the Latin mass.

"Nun bitten wir den Heiligen Geist" is documented in the 13th century, quoted by the Franciscan Berthold von Regensburg in a sermon. Its text read:

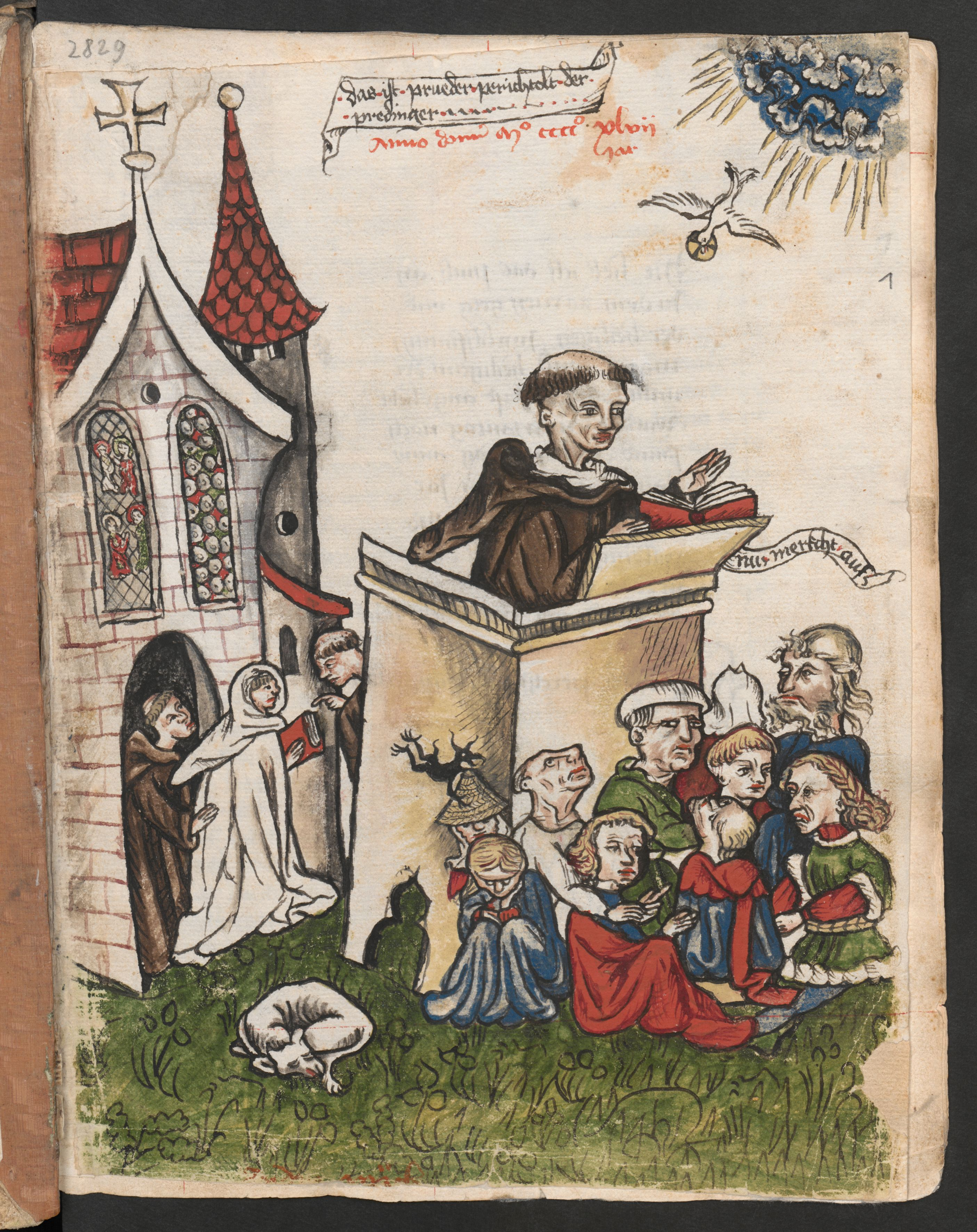
Berthold von Regensburg (1447)

Medieval German

Nû biten wir den heiligen geist
umbe den rechten glouben allermeist,
daz er uns behüete an unsrem ende,
sô wir heim suln varn ûz disem ellende.
kyrieleis.

— Evangelical Lutheran Hymnary Handbook, Fischer
Translation:
English

Now do we pray unto the Holy Ghost
For the true faith of all things the most,
That He may defend us when life is ending,
As from exile home we are wending.
Kyrieleis!

— The Free Lutheran Chorale-Book

This leise is a prayer in German addressing the Holy Spirit, reminiscent of the Latin sequence Veni Sancte Spiritus. It was first a Sterbelied, a song for someone dying. As in the conclusion of Veni Sancte Spiritus (da salutis exitum), the focus is the assistance of the Holy Spirit at the time of death. The concern is "most of all" (allermeist) the "right faith" (rechten glouben), considering to return "home" (heim) after the "exile" (ellende) of life. In the old German, "ellende" meant exile and was stressed on the second syllable, rhyming with "ende", whereas the modern "Elend" is stressed on the first syllable and translates to "misery". The person praying is aware that human life is transient and believes that the true home is Heaven, following a line from a letter of Paul the Apostle, Philippians 3:20.

The leise was widely known. A tune derived from the sequence's chant first appeared in Jistebnitz, modern-day Czech Republic, around 1420. The leise was used as a procession song and in sacred plays. It is one of the oldest hymns in German. "Nun bitten wir den Heiligen Geist" and "Christ ist erstanden" (Christ is risen) are the only medieval songs still in use.

== Protestant expansion ==
Protestant Reformers tried to continue medieval tradition. Martin Luther issued a 1523 liturgy for services; one aspect was the inclusion of hymns in German. He recommended, for lack of alternatives, three medieval songs to be sung regularly: "Gott sei gelobet und gebenedeiet", "Ein Kindelein so lobelich" and, probably as the gradual, "Nun bitten wir den Heiligen Geist". The leise had a long tradition. Its topics of the right faith (rechter Glaube, veram fide) and the thought of the time of death must have appealed to Luther. He had mentioned veram fide in an early sermon about the leise (1509 or 1510), and promoted salvation by faith alone (sola fide). Anxiety in the hour of death was a topic that Luther reflected for all of his life. In 1524, possibly for Pentecost, Luther expanded the leise "Nun bitten wir den Heiligen Geist" by three stanzas, addressing the Holy Spirit three more times.

=== Luther 1724 ===
Luther's text in modernised German, with a free rhymed translation into English, reads as follows:

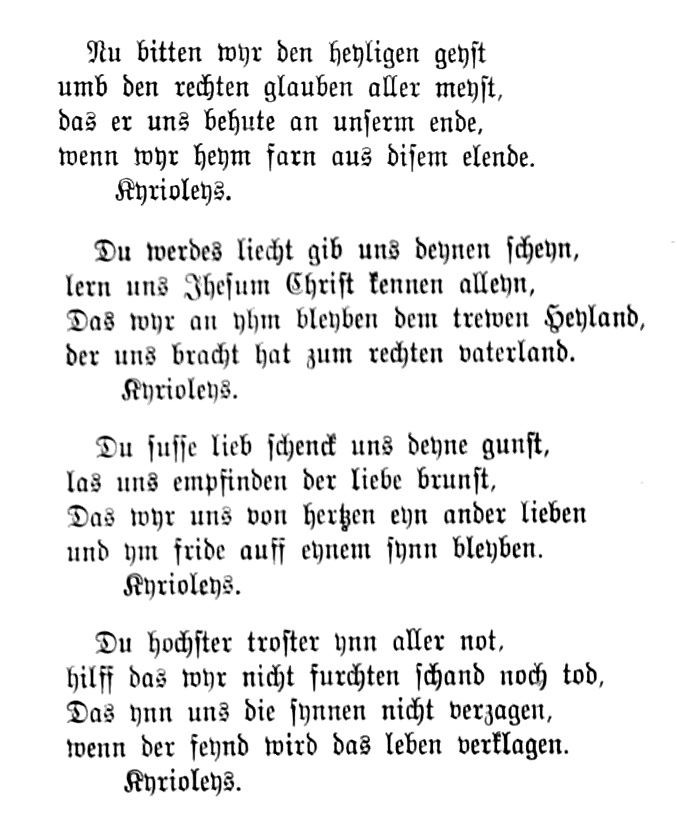
The text in the Wittenberg hymnal of 1524

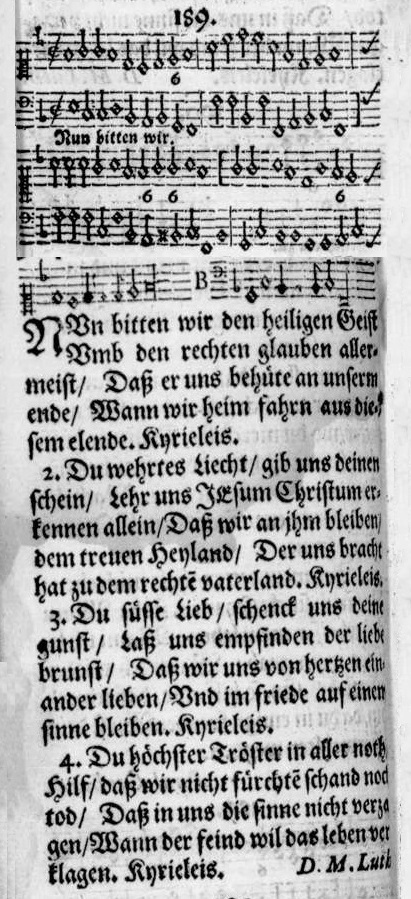
The hymn with tune and figured bass in the 1653 edition of Johann Crüger's Praxis pietatis melica

German

Nun bitten wir den Heiligen Geist
um den rechten Glauben allermeist,
daß er uns behüte an unserm Ende,
wenn wir heimfahrn aus diesem Elende.
Kyrieleis.

Du wertes Licht, gib uns deinen Schein
Lehr uns Jesum Christ kennen allein
Daß wir an ihm bleiben, dem treuen Heiland
Der uns bracht hat zum rechten Vaterland
Kyrieleis

Du süße Lieb, schenk uns deine Gunst
Laß uns empfinden der Liebe Brunst
Daß wir uns von Herzen einander lieben
Und im Friede auf einem Sinn blieben.
Kyrieleis.

Du höchster Tröster in aller Not
Hilf, daß wir nicht fürchten Schand noch Tod
Daß in uns die Sinnen nicht verzagen
Wenn der Feind wird das Leben verklagen
Kyrieleis

— Evangelical Lutheran Hymnary Handbook
Translation:
English

Now do we pray unto the Holy Ghost
For the true faith of all things the most,
That He may defend us when life is ending,
As from exile home we are wending.
Kyrieleis!

Thou precious Light, be Thou within us shone,
Teach us Jesus Christ to know alone,
That we may abide in the Lord who bought us,
Who to our true homeland hath brought us.
Kyrieleis!

Thou sweetest Love, Thy favor to us grant,
Give to us Thy love’s bright burning brand,
That with hearts united we love each other,
Of one mind, at peace with each brother.
Kyrieleis!

Thou highest Comforter in ev’ry need,
Help us of our death be unafraid,
That e’en then our courage may never fail us,
When the Foe at last shall assail us.
Kyrieleis!

— The Free Lutheran Chorale-Book

In the added stanzas, the Holy Spirit is addressed three more times, as "Du wertes Licht" (You esteemed light), "Du süße Lieb" (You sweet love) and "Du höchster Tröster" (You highest comforter). In the tradition of songs about the Holy Spirit, which mention its manifold gifts, the focus is on the aspects: light, love and comforter. His three stanzas can be seen as related to "Glaube, Liebe, Hoffnung", the theological virtues of faith, love and hope, which Paul the Apostle expressed in his letter, 1 Corinthians 13:13. Luther interpreted faith as belief in Jesus Christ, love to people and living in peace and unity, and hope in assistance of the Holy Spirit in remaining unafraid in the hour of death. He followed the medieval irregular metre, and ended each stanza with "Kyrieleis", as in the original.

=== Publication ===
Luther's text appeared in print first in 1524, in a collection Teutsch Kirchen ampt (German church office) in Strasbourg, and in Wittenberg, set to music by Johann Walter (Zahn No. 2029a), as part of Walter's choral hymnal Eyn geystlich Gesangk Buchleyn, sometimes called the First Wittenberg Hymnal. Luther prescribed the song for regular use between epistle reading and gospel reading in his Deutsche Messe, a 1526 liturgy for services in German, and included it among his funeral songs (Begräbnisgesänge) in 1542. Johann Crüger included the song, among many other hymn by Luther, in his hymnal Praxis pietatis melica, first published in 1647.

During the 18th and 19th centuries, several attempts were made to adapt the hymn to changing views of religion and aesthetic aspects. A Leipzig hymnal of 1796, Sammlung christlicher Gesänge (Collection of Christian songs) for use in public worship in the town's city churches, contains a version that is focused not on the right faith but (negatively) on protection against false doctrine and conversion of the erring. Faith becomes a topic only in its second stanza, combined with a prayer for a virtuous life.

Luther's version was restored in the 19th century with the movement to restore chorales (Choralrestauration). It is part of many hymnals and songbooks; in the current Protestant hymnal, Evangelisches Gesangbuch, the hymn appears as EG 124, opening the section of Pentecost songs.

=== Translations ===
The oldest translation of Luther's hymn, into Danish, appeared in 1528. Translations into English include "We now implore God the Holy Ghost" in The Lutheran Hymnal, St. Louis, 1941. Arthur Tozer Russell wrote a translation, rendered in the 1884 book Martin Luther, The Hymns of Martin Luther, "Now pray we all God, the Comforter". It was also translated as "To God the Holy Spirit let us pray". Like other hymns by Luther, it is part of several hymnals in English, recommended as an introit and a song for Pentecost.

=== Melody and musical settings ===
Johann Walter, who collaborated with Luther on the music, modified the medieval chant tune slightly giving it distinct rhythmic shape. In later versions over the centuries, the rhythmic features disappeared, but his version was restored in the 19th century with the movement to restore chorales.

Walter set the hymn for four parts in his Eyn geystlich Gesangk Buchleyn. He set it for five parts (SATBB) for the 1537 edition of the hymnal. He also wrote a six-part version (SSAATB).

Michael Praetorius composed seven a cappella settings for two to six voices. Dieterich Buxtehude composed two chorale preludes, BuxWV 208 and BuxWV 209. Johann Crüger set the hymn (transcribed below) as one of 161 hymns in his 1649 collection Geistliche Kirchen-Melodien (Sacred church melodies).

Johann Sebastian Bach used the third stanza to conclude his cantata Gott soll allein mein Herze haben, BWV 169. It was composed in Leipzig for the 18th Sunday after Trinity, dealing with the topic of the Great Commandment and first performed on 20 October 1726. Bach also set the same stanza for a wedding cantata in the 1730s, Gott ist unsre Zuversicht, BWV 197, where it concluded Part I, the fifth of ten movements. His third setting is an untexted four-part version, BWV 385.

Organ preludes were composed by Georg Böhm, Helmut Eder, Paul Hamburger, Arnold Mendelssohn, Ernst Pepping, Heinrich Scheidemann, Johann Gottfried Vierling, Helmut Walcha and Johann Gottfried Walther, among others.

In 1936, Johann Nepomuk David wrote a chorale motet for four-part choir a cappella, Nun bitten wir den Heiligen Geist. Hugo Distler composed a setting for three high voices (SSA) with instrumental interludes for a trio of flute, oboe and violin, or two violins and viola. The song is the first movement of Pepping's 1951 Deutsche Choralmesse (Chorale Mass in German) for six voices a cappella (SSATBB), in the position of the Kyrie call of the Latin mass.

In 1984, Herbert Blendinger wrote a composition for cello and organ titled Meditation über den Choral "Nun bitten wir den heiligen Geist", Op. 36. Jacques Wildberger composed Pentecostal music for viola solo in 1986, Diaphanie: Fantasia super "Veni creator spiritus" et Canones diversi super "Nun bitten wir den heiligen Geist", combining the hymn with another Latin sequence, Veni creator spiritus. It was published in Zürich in 1989.

== Catholic expansions ==
=== Vehe 1537 ===
In response to the Reformation's movement for singing hymns in German, the Catholics countered with different hymns and hymnals, also in German. In 1537 Michael Vehe, a Dominican friar and theologian, published a hymnal in Leipzig, Ein New Gesangbuechlin Geystlicher Lieder (A new little songbook of sacred songs) with the description vor alle gutthe Christen nach ordenung Christlicher kirchen. Ordenung vnd Gebrauch der Geystlichen Lieder (for all good Christians after the order of Christian churches. Order and use of sacred songs.) It contained a song that also used the medieval stanza as a starting point for three additional stanzas, independent from Luther's. This hymn was placed in a section for Pentecost. It reads: The three stanzas read as follows:

Erleuchte uns, o ewiges Licht;
hilf, daß alles, was durch uns geschieht,
Gott sei wohlgefällig durch Jesum Christum,
der uns macht heilig durch sein Priestertum.
Kyrieleis.

O höchster Tröster und wahrer Gott,
steh uns treulich bei in aller Not;
mach rein unser Leben, schein uns dein Gnade,
laß uns nicht weichem von dem rechten Pfade.
Kyrieleis.

Dein heilge Lieb und Allgütigkeit
mache gnädig unser Herz bereit,
daß wir unsern Nächsten recht christlich lieben,
und stets bleiben in deinem heilgen Frieden.
Kyrieleis.

Like in Luther's version, the Holy Spirit is addressed three times, as eternal light, comforter and finally love and goodness. The prayer is firstly for actions pleasing God, secondly for a pure life, not deviating from the right path, and finally to love one's neighbour and remain in peace. For Catholics, the "right path" meant the Catholic church, and deviating meant to follow the Reformation.

With few exceptions, the hymn disappeared from Catholic hymnals after the Baroque period. Heinrich Bone, a Catholic educator and hymnwriter, revived it when he published his hymnal Cantate! in Mainz in 1847; it contained the hymn in a version not imploring the Holy Spirit for the right faith, but in the right faith, taking for granted that the singer had the right faith, and finding to doubt that offensive.

The hymn received wider distribution only in the second half of the 20th century, after the collection Kirchenlied, a 1938 attempt at a common Christian hymnal in German published by Josef Diewald, Adolf Lohmann and Georg Thurmair, included it. Its version was based on Vehe's, while other hymns by Luther were included although without credit to his name.

=== Thurmair 1975 ===
The hymn-writer Maria Luise Thurmair was active in the preparation of the first common German Catholic hymnal Gotteslob, published in 1975. She wrote three new stanzas, which were taken as stanzas 2 to 4 of a hymn beginning with the medieval first stanza and ending with the second stanza from the Vehe version. In the three inner stanzas, the Holy Spirit is addressed, now as "Du heller Schein" (You radiant light), "Du stille Macht" (You silent power), and "Du mächtger Hauch" (You mighty breath). She alluded to Luther's version in some aspects, but completely ignored the aspect of transience when dying. The melody of her song is a transcription of the chant in fixed rhythm.

The first edition of Gotteslob also contained Vehe's version in regional sections, such as for the Diocese of Limburg as GL 870 with the same transcription of the chant. Thurmair's version was retained in the second edition of the Gotteslob in 2013, as GL 348.
