= Macht weit die Pforten in der Welt =

Hymn first published in 1829

- Christian hymn
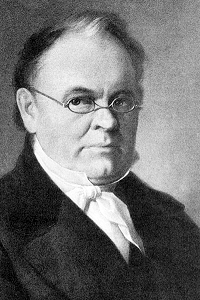
- Occasion: Advent; Feast of Christ the King
- Text: by Albert Knapp
- Language: German
- Based on: Psalm 98
- Melody: by Adolf Lohmann
- Composed: 1938
- Published: 1829

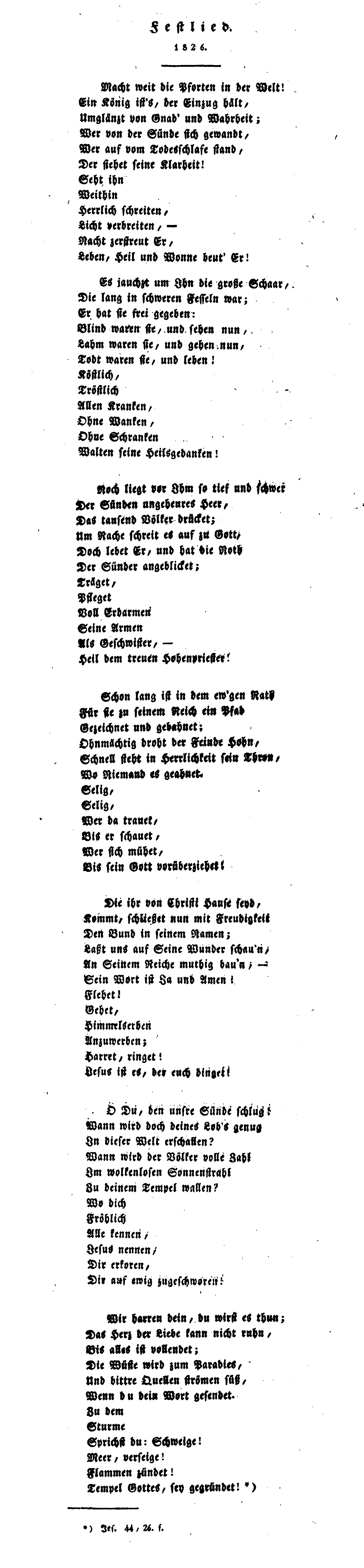
First print

"Macht weit die Pforten in der Welt" (Make the gates in the world wide) is a Christian hymn with German text by Albert Knapp written for the Basel Mission and first published in 1829. It appeared in 19th-century German hymnals, to be sung with the melody of "Wie schön leuchtet der Morgenstern". It appeared in the 1938 hymnal Kirchenlied with a new melody by Adolf Lohmann. The song is part of the 2013 German Catholic hymnal Gotteslob.

== History ==
Albert Knapp wrote the text of "Macht weit die Pforten in der Welt" in 1826. Knapp was then a young Protestant pastor in Sulz am Neckar, and wrote this hymn and others in his twenties, in a series of songs for the annual meeting (Jahresfest) of the Basel Mission. It was first sung at the Martinskirche on 25 May 1826. Knapp was a prolific writer of Christian poetry but reluctant to publish them. His friends published two volumes of his lyrics in Basel in 1829 in a collection entitled Christliche Gedichte (Christian Poems), with "Macht weit die Pforten" in the second volume. The collection became known in Germany.

The poem appeared also in Johann Peter Lange's hymnal in 1843, in the Jauersches Gesangbuch in Breslau in 1855, in an Oldenburg hymnal and the Schlesisches Gesangbuch both in 1868, among others. In 1938, it became part of the hymnal Kirchenlied with a melody by Adolf Lohmann. It was one of the Christköniglieder, proclaiming Christ the King in opposition to the Nazi regime.

The song was included in the German Catholic hymnal Gotteslob of 1975 in regional sections. It appeared in five stanzas in the 2013 edition as GL 360, in the section "Leben in Gott - Jesus Christus" (Life in God). It has been recommended for both Advent and Feast of Christ the King.

== Text and theme ==
The call to open gates in the world is relates to general symbols which are often referred to in the Bible. Knapp wrote seven stanzas, with a focus on opening the gates for the entry of a King.

== Melody and musical settings ==
When the poem was first used as a hymn, it was sung to the melody of "Wie schön leuchtet der Morgenstern". For the publication in Kirchenlied in 1938, Adolf Lohmann created a melody, which was also used in later hymnals. It was described as "expressive". Bertold Hummel set this melody to a prelude and four-part setting in 1994.
