= Grates nunc omnes =

Latin hymn for Christmas Mass

Grates nunc omnes is the title and first three words of the Latin sequence for Midnight Mass at Christmas.

== History ==
It dates from the 11th century and first appears in a troparion from Regensburg dating to 1030. It belongs to a set of sequences which fell out of use in the official Roman Catholic liturgy after the Council of Trent.

The Grates nunc omnes sequence was also used for communion and as a processional song. In the 14th century a custom developed of linking sequences with German-language responsorial stanzas. The leise Lovet sistu Ihesu Crist is first documented in a Middle Low German manuscript of 1380 from the Cistercian monastery at Medingen. Martin Luther used this and six more verses to create his Christmas hymn Gelobet seist du, Jesu Christ (EG 23, GL 252).

== Text and translations ==
Latin	Translation (from the Latin)	German translation (Hymnal, Michael Vehe, 1537)	German adaptation (14th century, via Martin Luther)
Grates nunc omnes reddamus Domino Deo qui sua nativitate nos liberavit de diabolica potestate. Huic oportet ut canamus cum angelis semper sit gloria in excelsis.	Let us now all return thanks to the Lord God who by his nativity freed us from the devil's power. For this it is right that we sing with the angels "forever let there be glory in the highest"	Dank sagen wir alle mit Schalle dem Herrn unserm Gott der durch sein Geburt uns erlöset hat von der teuflischen Macht und Gewalt. Dem sollen wir mit seinen Engeln fröhlich singen allzeit Preis in der Höhe.	Gelobet seist du, Jesu Christ, dass du Mensch geboren bist von einer Jungfrau, das ist wahr, des freuet sich der Engel Schar. Kyrieleis.

== Bibliography ==
- (in German) Hansjakob Becker and others (ed.): Geistliches Wunderhorn. Große deutsche Kirchenlieder. C. H. Beck, München 2001, ISBN 3-406-48094-2, S. 69–75.
