= Christ fuhr gen Himmel =

German Ascension hymn

- German hymn
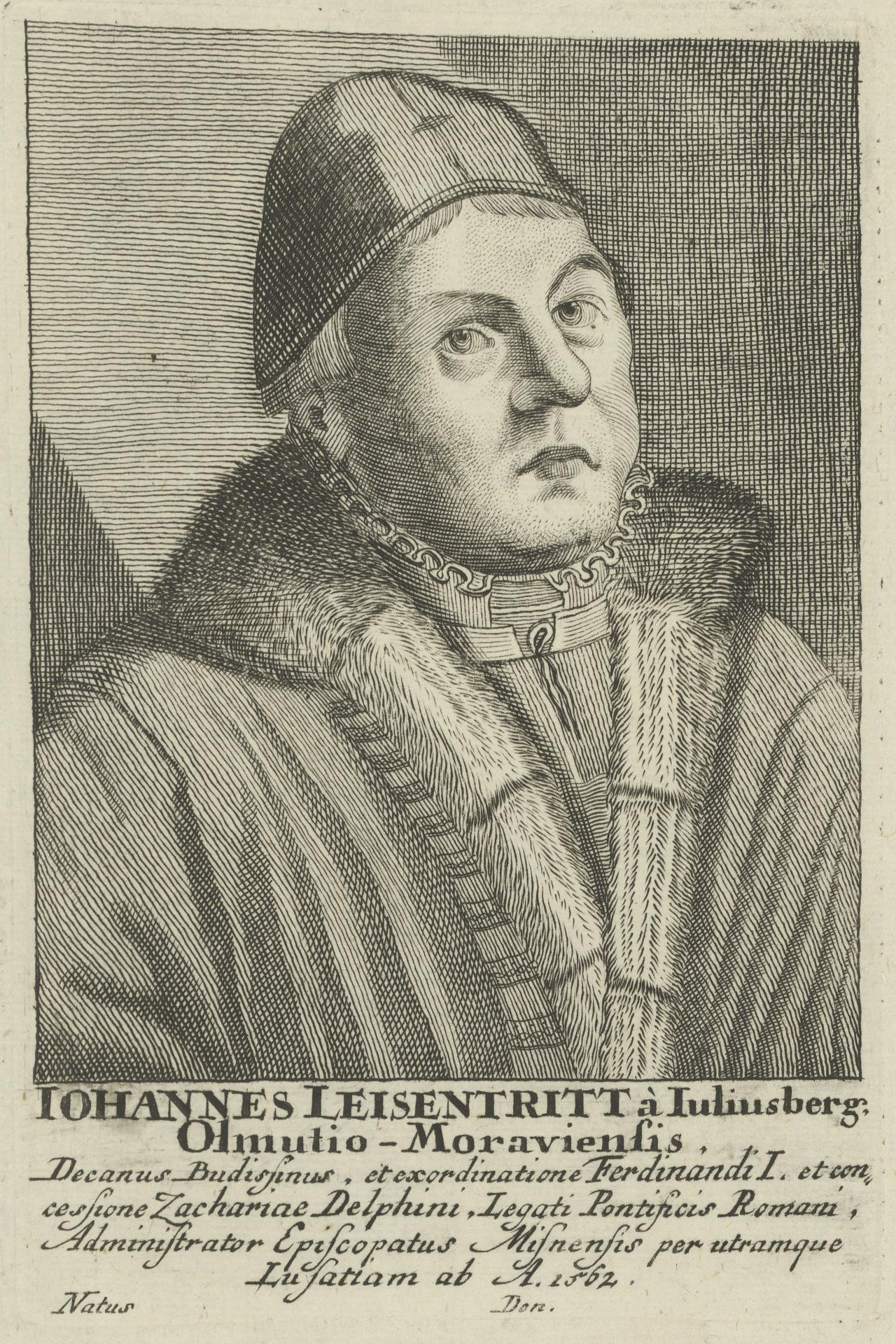
- Johannes Leisentritt who added a second stanza to a medieval Leise
- English: Christ rose to Heaven
- Occasion: Ascension
- Text: anon.; Johann Leisentritt (2nd stanza)
- Language: German
- Melody: "Christ ist erstanden"
- Published: 1480/1567
- Tune EG 120

"Christ fuhr gen Himmel" (Christ rose to Heaven) is a German Ascension hymn. The church song is based the medieval melody of the Easter hymn "Christ ist erstanden". It was an ecumenical song from the beginning, with the first stanza published in 1480, then included in a Lutheran hymnal in 1545, and expanded by the Catholic Johannes Leisentritt in 1567. It appears in modern German Catholic and Protestant hymnals, and has inspired musical settings by composers from the 16th to the 21st century.

== History ==
Most 15th century church hymns were sung in Latin. A few chants on high holidays sung in German became the first to introduce vernacular language into the liturgy. They began as inserts into tropes in Latin sequences. "Christ fuhr gen Himmel" is a Leise, an early church song in German, each verse ending with the word "Kyrieleis" (from the Greek "kyrie eleison", for "Lord have mercy". It is modeled after the Easter Leise "Christ ist erstanden". The hymn, one stanza and Alleluia, appeared first in Crailsheim in 1480, in a Schulordnung, where it was inserted in the Latin "Summi triumphum Regis". The 1545 hymnal Babstsches Gesangbuch had the same text, but with a slightly different melody. The second stanza appeared first in Bautzen in 1567, in Johannes Leisentritt's collection Geistliche Lieder und Psalmen [...] (Spiritual songs and psalms).

The hymn was part of the 1938 hymnal Kirchenlied, a Catholic hymnal published by Georg Thurmair containing also Protestant songs. It has been printed in German Protestant hymnals up to Evangelisches Gesangbuch (EG 120). It is also part of the German Catholic hymnal Gotteslob, as GL 319, written below the music for "Christ ist erstanden" as GL 318).

The contemporary theologian Alois Albrecht wrote a paraphrase titled "Der ersetzte Himmel" ("The replaced Heaven"), beginning each of five stanzas with the first line of the traditional hymn, then reflecting aspects of its meaning.

== Text ==
The text (with additional line-break after each comma) is:

Ein ſchön Geſang auff das Feſt der Auffahrt Chriſti in der vorgehenden Melodey, Chriſt iſt Erſtanden, folio 119.

Chriſt fuhr gen Himel,
was ſand er uns wider,
Er ſendet uns den heilgn Geiſt,
Zu troſt der armen Chriſtenheit,
Kyrieeleiſon.

Chriſt fuhr mit ſchalle,
von ſeinen Jüngrn alle,
macht ein Creutz mit ſeiner Handt,
unnd thet den Segn vbr all Landt,
Kyrieeleiſon.

Alleluia,
Alleluia,
Alleluia,
Das ſollen wir alle fro ſein,
Chriſt ſoll unſer Troſt ſein,
Kyrieeleiſon

The text is in modern German:

Christ fuhr gen Himmel.
Was sandt er uns hernieder?
Er sandte uns den Heilgen Geist
zu Trost der armen Christenheit.
Kyrieleis.

Christ fuhr mit Schallen
von seinen Jüngern allen.
Er segnet sie mit seiner Hand
und sandte sie in alle Land.
Kyrieleis.

Halleluja,
Halleluja,
Halleluja.
Des solln wir alle froh sein;
Christ will unser Trost sein.
Kyrieleis.

== Musical settings ==
Johann Werlin composed a setting for three voices in 1648. Hugo Distler wrote a setting as part of his cycle Der Jahrkreis, Op. 5, for three high voices a cappella, replacing Kyrieleis by Halleluja. Ulrich Baudach wrote a three-part setting in 1962. Dominik Gerhard composed an organ improvisation on the song in 2009. Christopher Tambling wrote a setting for three or four voices and brass on his own melody, published in 2015. Hermann Pallhuber composed an orchestral piece "Momentum Profectionis" which is based on the hymn and was premiered in Crailsheim in 2016, for the 500th anniversary of the Reformation.
