= Leise =

The Leise or Leis (plural Leisen; from the Greek kyrie eleison) is a genre of vernacular medieval church song. They appear to have originated in the German-speaking regions, but are also found in Scandinavia, and are a precursor of Protestant church music.

Leisen arose in the Middle Ages as brief responses in the vernacular to sung elements of the Latin Mass, especially sequences sung on feast days of the ecclesiastical year, and were also sung during processionals and on pilgrimages. They often consist of a single stanza, ending in some form of Kyrie eleison, which is supposedly the origin of the name.

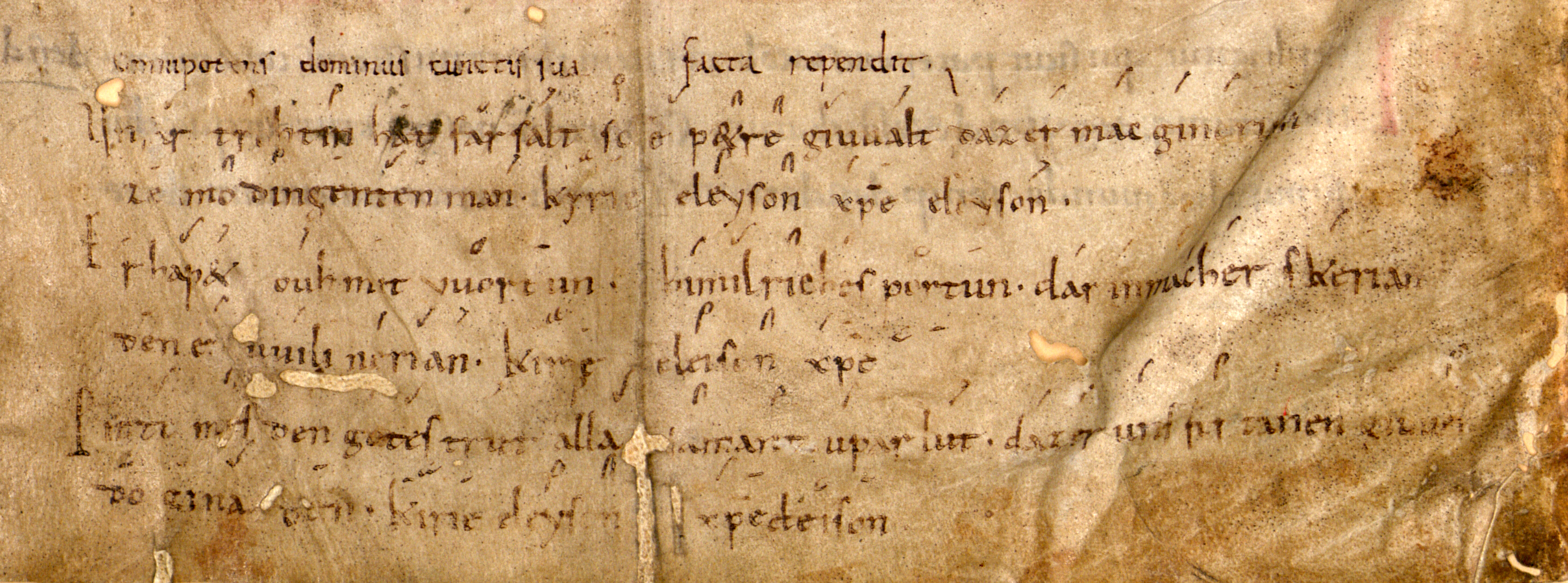
The neumed manuscript of the Petruslied, Unsar trothîn hât farsalt, the oldest known Leise

The oldest known Leise, the Petruslied, is found on the last page (folio 158v) of a manuscript of In Genesin by Hrabanus Maurus, dated circa 860, formerly in the cathedral library of Freising, now in the Bayerische Staatsbibliothek in Munich. It is a song to St. Peter, with the title Unsar trothîn hât farsalt, and was added to the manuscript in the ninth or in the early tenth century. Another early example is the Adalbertuslied (for Adalbert of Prague), which was popular in Bohemia and was sung at the saint's grave during droughts; they were also sometimes sung before battles. They are an early expression of popular piety.

Martin Luther expanded several leisen into chorales, and they are therefore forerunners of German Protestant hymnology.

== Leisen in current use ==
=== German ===
The Evangelisches Gesangbuch (EG, the German-language Protestant hymnal used in Germany, Austria, Alsace, Lorraine, and Luxembourg) and the Catholic hymnal Gotteslob (GL, used in Germany, Austria, and South Tyrol) include the following leisen:

- "Sei uns willkommen, Herre Christ" (EG 22), revised from the original
- "Gelobet seist du, Jesu Christ" (EG 23, GL 252), first stanza 1380, expanded by Luther to the Christmas sequence Grates nunc omnes
- "Du Kind, zu dieser heilgen Zeit" (EG 50, GL 254), a modern Christmas leise by Jochen Klepper (1937)
- "Ehre sei dir, Christe" (EG 75)
- "Holz auf Jesu Schulter" (EG 97, GL 291), a modern Easter leise (Dutch 1963, German 1975)
- "Christ ist erstanden" (EG 99, GL 318), expanded by Luther to the Easter sequence Victimae Paschali Laudes
- "Jesus Christus, unser Heiland" (EG 102)
- "Christ fuhr gen Himmel" (EG 120, GL 319), expanded by Luther
- "Nun bitten wir den Heiligen Geist" (EG 124, GL 348), adapted by Luther (the GL version has stanzas by Maria Luise Thurmair and Michael Vehe)
- "Gott sei gelobet und gebenedeiet" (EG 214, GL 215), accompanying the Corpus Christi sequence Lauda Sion
- "Herr Jesu Christe, mein getreuer Hirte" (EG 217), by Johann Heermann (1630)
- "Dies sind die heilgen Zehn Gebot" (EG 231), by Luther
- "In Gottes Namen fahren wir" (EG 498), pilgrim song
- "Mitten wir im Leben sind" (EG 518, GL 503), by Luther
- "Maria durch ein Dornwald ging" (GL 224)
- "Meine engen Grenzen" (GL 437; EG-West/Reformed Church 600; EG-Hesse 584; EG-Württemberg 589; EG-Austria 574)
- "Sonne der Gerechtigkeit" (GL 481; EG 262/263)

=== Swedish ===
- "Uthi Gudz Namn nu rese wij" (1695 Swedish hymnal, 336; 1996 Lutheran hymnal, 968), translation of In Gottes Namen fahren wir; in 1736 Lars Högmarck attributed the original to Nikolaus Herman and the translation to Laurentius Jonae Gestritius.
