= Mein Gott, wie schön ist deine Welt =

- German Catholic hymn
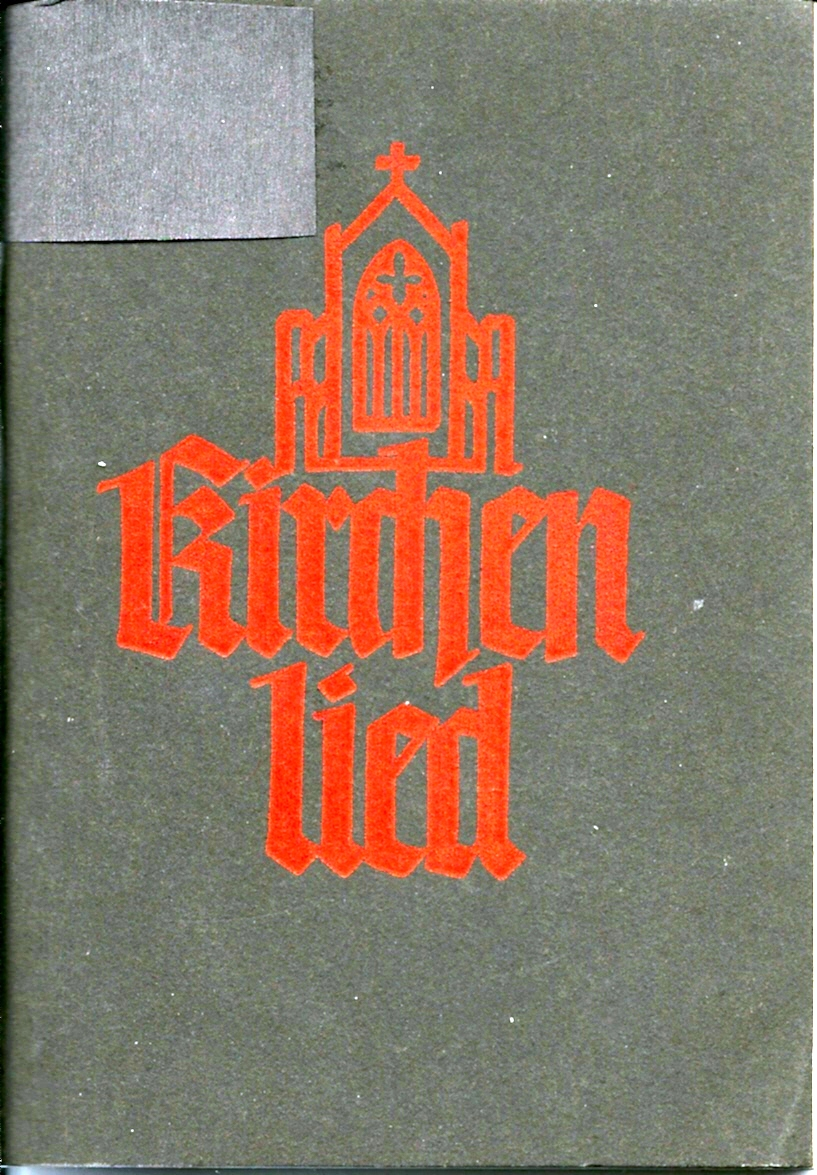
- Cover of Kirchenlied which contained the hymn, second edition, 1938
- English: My God, how beautiful is Your World
- Genre: Hymn
- Written: 1936
- Text: by Georg Thurmair
- Language: German
- Melody: Heinrich Neuß
- Published: 1938

"Mein Gott, wie schön ist deine Welt" (My God, how beautiful is Your World) is a German Catholic hymn. It was written by Georg Thurmair in 1936. The melody was composed by Heinrich Neuß the same year. It was part of Thurmair's 1938 hymnal Kirchenlied, and it is part of regional sections of the Catholic hymnal Gotteslob (2013).

== History ==
Georg Thurmair wrote the song "Mein Gott, wie schön ist deine Welt" in 1936. It was set to music the same year by Heinrich Neuß. The song, in four long stanzas, expresses thankfulness for the Creation. It was included in Thurmair's hymnal Kirchenlied in 1938. Its incipit is the header for the section of daytime songs. A collection of early poems by Thurmair was published with the hymn's beginning as the title.

In the first common Catholic hymnal, the 1975 Gotteslob, the song was not part of the common section (Stammteil) but did appear in regional sections. In the 2013 edition, it was again omitted from the common section but included in several regional sections.

== Theme ==
The beginning of the song uses a diary entry of the Romantic poet Joseph von Eichendorff who wrote on 14 September 1805, after travelling in the Harz mountains: "O Gott! wie schön ist deine Welt! riefen wir alle einmütig aus im seligen Genusse und konnten nur mit Mühe unsere Blicke von der unermeßlichen Weite ablenken." (O God! How beautiful is Your World! we all exclaimed unanimously in blissful enjoyment, and could only with difficulty distract our eyes from the immeasurable vastness.) All stanzas end in the same line, which repeats the first line, adding even another exclamation "wie schön ist deine Welt". The four stanzas describe creatures, first plants (green forests, blooming meadows), sun and rushing clouds which are compared to the fast movement of life. In the second stanza, animals appear, also sun, moon and stars. In the third stanza, human beings are described as praising the shining creation. The final stanza is a prayer for support in times of thunderstorms.
