= Kirchenlied =

1938 German Catholic hymnal

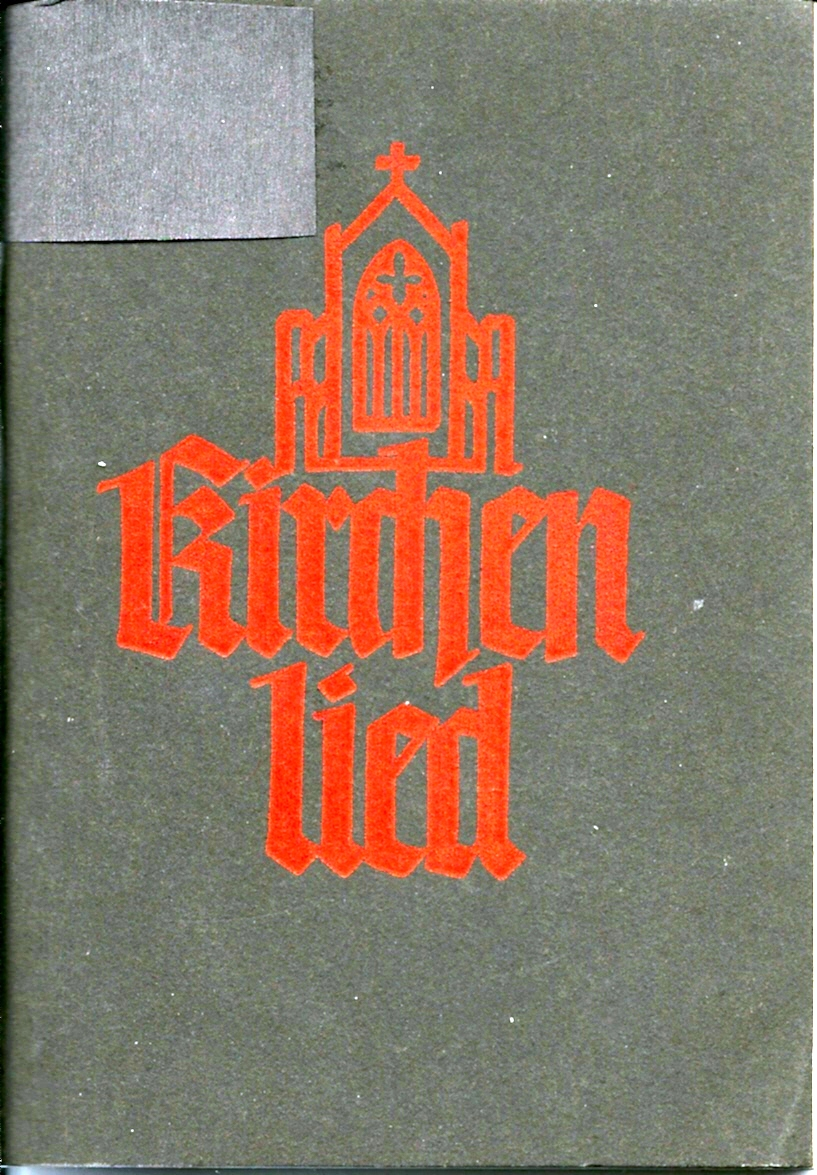
- Title page of the text edition, second edition, 1938
- Language: German
- Genre: Hymnal
- Published: 1938
- Publisher: Josef Diewald; Adolf Lohmann; Georg Thurmair

Kirchenlied ("Church song") is a German Catholic hymnal published in 1938. It was a collection of 140 old and new songs, including hymns by Protestant authors. It was the seed for a common Catholic hymnal which was realised decades later, in the Gotteslob (1975).

== History ==
Kirchenlied was published in 1938 by Josef Diewald, Adolf Lohmann and Georg Thurmair. It was a collection of 140 songs from different periods, starting in the 16th century, and it included several Protestant songs as well as ten of Thurmair's own songs. Known as the "Standard Songbook", it was designed to be a common hymnal for German-speaking Catholics.

Kirchenlied was published first by the Jugendhaus Düsseldorf, subtitled Eine Auslese geistlicher Lieder für die Jugend ("A selection of sacred songs for youth"). The hymnal, unlike other publications by Thurmair, was not immediately banned by the Nazis, because of its many Protestant songs. From the fourth edition, the subtitle was shortened to "Eine Auslese geistlicher Lieder" because it was generally accepted, not only by young people. It was published by the Christophorus-Verlag, then part of the Catholic Verlag Herder.

Kirchenlied was significant for ecumenical church singing in German and became the seed for the 1975 Gotteslob. 75 of its songs were included in the Gotteslob.

== Layout ==
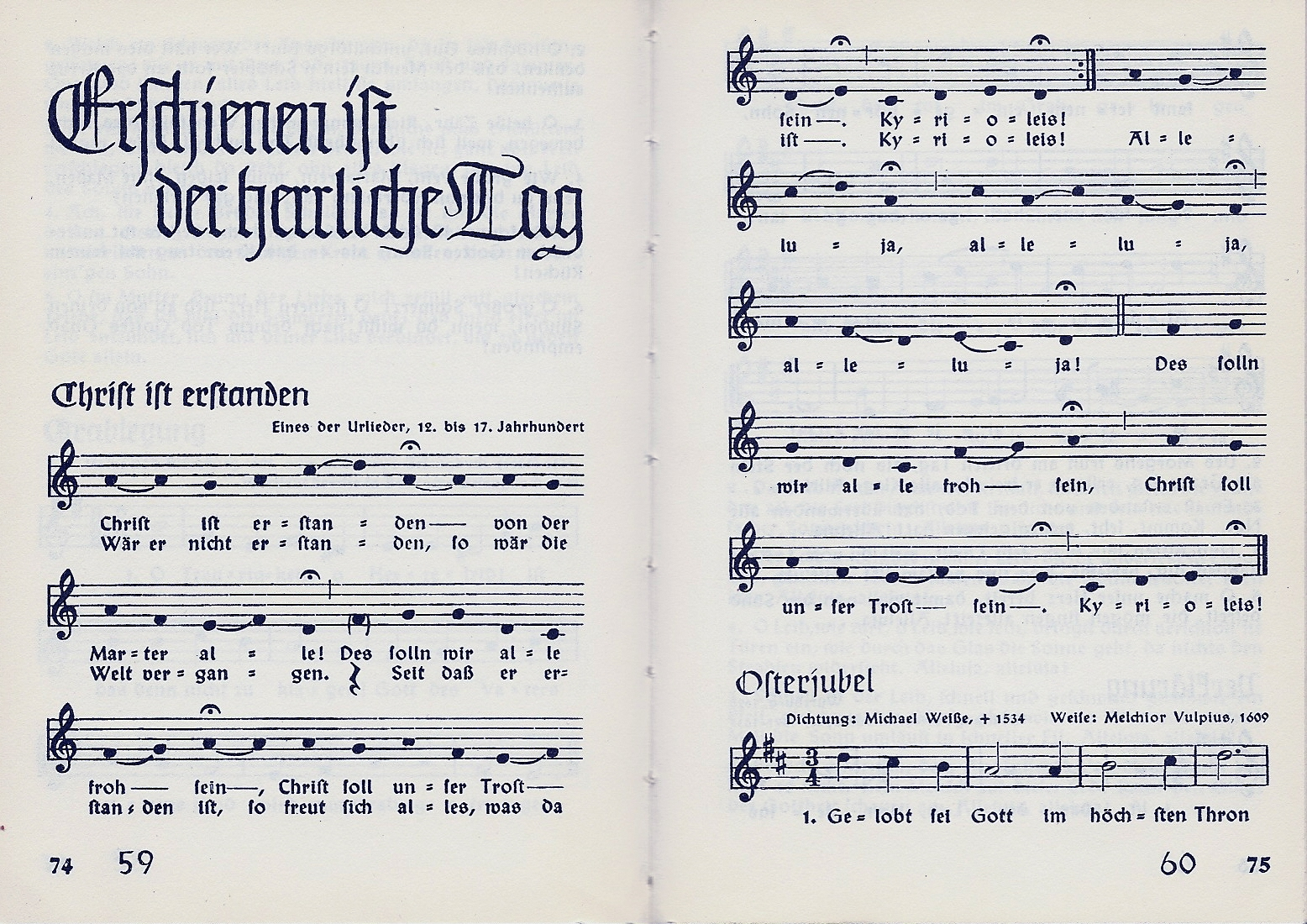
Song No. 59, Christ ist erstanden, edited by Alfred Riedel, pages 74/75

The hymnal appeared in a text edition (Textausgabe) and an edition with musical scores (Notenausgabe). The exterior design was simple. The music books were partly in two colours, with the headers and staff red, text and notes black. Alfred Riedel was responsible for the layout with its large structuring headers for the sections, and a cover which showed a stylised view of the Altenberger Dom. The adjacent Haus Altenberg was from 1926 the centre of the Catholic youth movement. The hymnal had no illustrations and included some songs derived from Gregorian chant, rendered without rhythm and metre.

== Topics ==
The songs are grouped by themes, which are marked by section headers. Songs of general praise and petition are followed by songs for the occasions of the liturgical year, songs venerating Saints (Heiligenlieder), songs for the times of day, songs about death and dying, and hymns for the celebration of mass. All but the last header are the incipits of hymns.

- Großer Gott, wir loben dich (1–7) – Praise
- Unsere Zuflucht, Gott, du bist (8–20) – Petition
- Es kommt der Herr der Herrlichkeit (21–29) – Advent
- Es ist ein Ros entsprungen (30–44) – Christmas
- Mir nach! spricht Christus (45–48) – Following Jesus
- O du hochheilig Kreuze (49–58) – Passiontide
- Erschienen ist der herrliche Tag (59–68) – Easter
- O Jesu Christe wahres Licht (69–80) – Pentecost
- Kommt her, des Königs Aufgebot (81–85)
- Gegrüßet seist du, Maria (86–99) – Mary
- Ihr Freunde Gottes allzugleich (100–107) – Saints
- Der Tag ist aufgegangen (108–116) – Morning
- Mein Gott, wie schön ist deine Welt (117–120) – Daytime
- Mit meinem Gott geh ich zur Ruh (121–128) – Evening
- Wir sind nur Gast auf Erden (129–133) – Death
- Zur Opferfeier (134–140) – Mass

== Songs of Protestant origin ==
The collection includes 38 songs, sometimes shortened, which were written by Protestant authors, including "Lobe den Herren", "Macht hoch die Tür" and "Wie schön leuchtet der Morgenstern". 26 of them were here published in a Catholic hymnal for the first time. Three songs by Martin Luther were included in the hymnal ("Es kam ein Engel hell und klar", "Gelobet seist du, Jesu Christ" and "Gott sei gelobet und gebenedeiet"), but his name was not mentioned; instead, a temporal reference, "16th century", was used. While the inclusion of these songs met with criticism, Bishop or Mainz Albert Stohr, in his preface, congratulates the editors for their ecumenical effort: "Dank sei euch, daß ihr mit Liebe gesammelt habt, was uns an gemeinsamem Liedgut verbinden kann zu einem gewaltigen Gottbekenntnis aller Christen in deutschen Landen!" (Thanks be to you, for you collected with love a common wealth of songs which can unite us to a powerful profession of God by all Christians in German lands!)

== Songs ==
No.	Incipit
1	Dein Lob, Herr, ruft der Himmel aus
2	Erde, singe
4	Allein Gott in der Höh sei Ehr
5	Lobe den Herren, den mächtigen König der Ehren
6	Großer Gott, wir loben dich
7	Ein Haus voll Glorie schauet
15	Wer nur den lieben Gott läßt walten
16	Was Gott tut, das ist wohlgetan
20	Nun danket all und bringet Ehr
22	O Heiland, reiß die Himmel auf
24	Wachet auf, ruft uns die Stimme
25	Macht hoch die Tür
26	Macht weit die Pforten in der Welt
27	Gott, heilger Schöpfer aller Stern
29	Unser lieben Frauen Traum
31	Es ist ein Ros entsprungen
32	In dulci jubilo
33	Singen wir mit Fröhlichkeit
35	Es kam ein Engel hell und klar
37	Vom Himmel hoch, o Engel, kommt
39	Zu Bethlehem geboren
41	Gelobet seist du, Jesu Christ
42	Lobt Gott, ihr Christen allzugleich
44	Wie schön leucht' uns der Morgenstern
45	Mir nach! spricht Christus, unser Held
52	Herzliebster Jesu, was hast du verbrochen
54	O Haupt voll Blut und Wunden
58	O Traurigkeit, o Herzeleid
59	Christ ist erstanden
60	Gelobt sei Gott im höchsten Thron
62	Laßt uns erfreuen herzlich sehr
64	Erschienen ist der herrliche Tag
65	Christ fuhr gen Himmel
67	Nun bitten wir den Heiligen Geist
69	O Jesu Christe, wahres Licht
70	Liebster Jesu, wir sind hier
71	Schönster Herr Jesu
73	Morgenstern der finstern Nacht
74	Ich will dich lieben, meine Stärke
77	Gott sei gelobet und gebenedeiet
78	Im Frieden dein, o Herre mein
88	Ave Maria zart
96	Nun, Brüder, sind wir frohgemut
97	Maria, breit den Mantel aus
100	Herr Gott, dich loben alle wir
101	Unüberwindlich starker Held
110	Die güldne Sonne voll Freud und Wonne
111	Die helle Sonn leucht' jetzt herfür
114	Aus meines Herzens Grunde
115	Lobet den Herren alle, die ihn ehren
117	Geh aus, mein Herz, und suche Freud
118	Mein Gott, wie schön ist deine Welt
125	Nun ruhen alle Wälder
129	Wir sind nur Gast auf Erden
130	Ach wie flüchtig, ach wie nichtig
131	Mitten in dem Leben sind wir vom Tod umfangen
134	Zu dir, o Gott, erheben wir
135	Gott in der Höh sei Preis und Ehr
138	O du Lamm Gottes unschuldig

== Literature ==
- Hartmann Bernberg: Singt dem Herrn ein neues Lied! Das deutsche Kirchenlied + Erbe und Aufgabe. Verlag Jugendhaus Düsseldorf, Düsseldorf
