= Gott sei gelobet und gebenedeiet =

Lutheran hymn composed by Martin Luther

- Hymn by Martin Luther
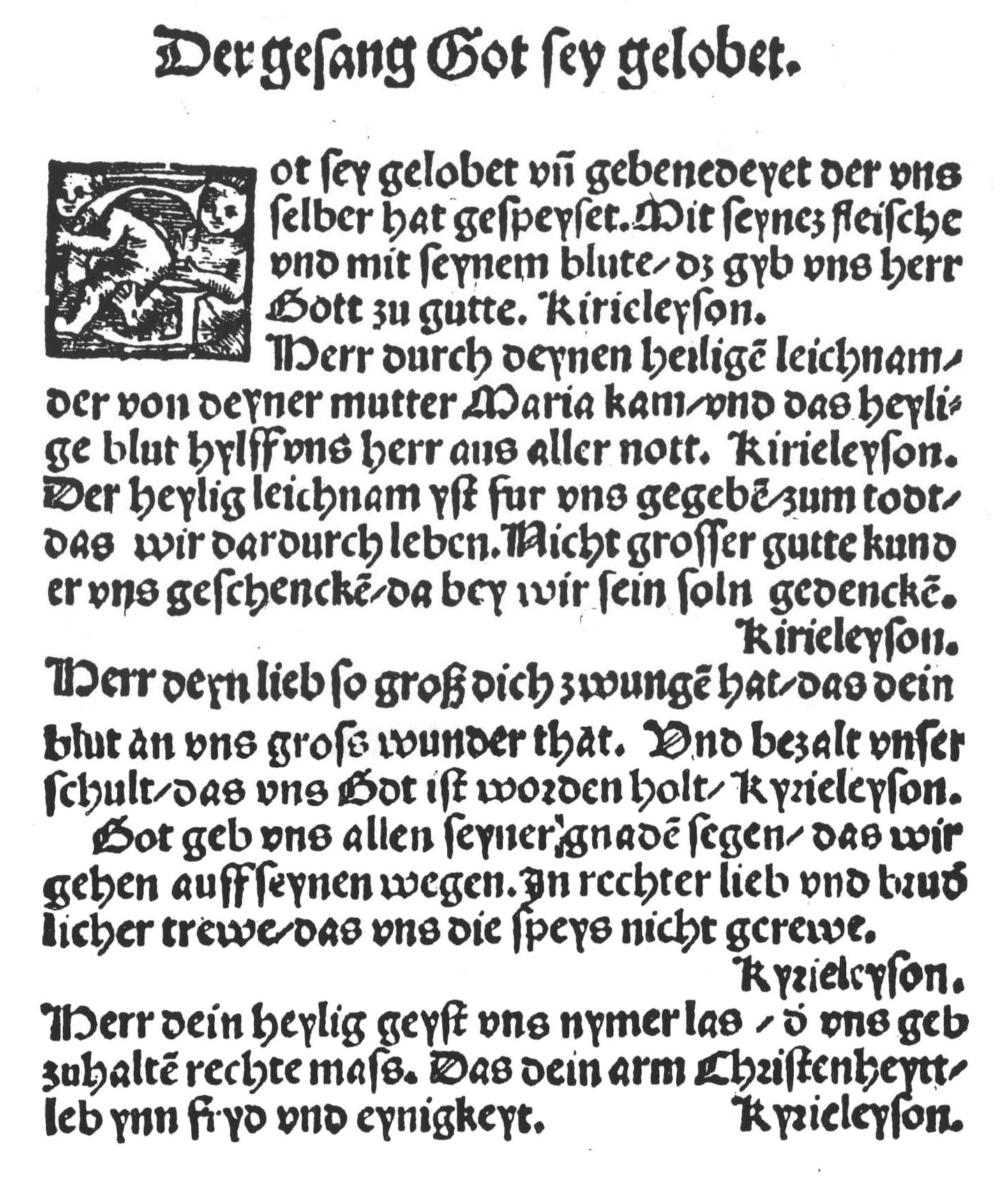
- The hymn in the Erfurt Enchiridion
- Occasion: Communion
- Text: by Martin Luther
- Language: German
- Published: 1524

"Gott sei gelobet und gebenedeiet" (God be praised and blessed) is a Lutheran hymn of 1524 with words written by Martin Luther who used an older first stanza and melody. It is a song of thanks after communion. Luther's version in three stanzas was printed in the Erfurt Enchiridion of 1524 and in Johann Walter's choral hymnal Eyn geystlich Gesangk Buchleyn the same year. Today, the song appears in German hymnals, including both the Protestant Evangelisches Gesangbuch (EG 214), and in a different version in the Catholic Gotteslob (GL 215).

== History ==
Text and melody of "Gott sei gelobet und gebenedeiet" are based on a Leise, a German congregational refrain ending on Kyrie eleison, of the Latin sequence Lauda Sion for Corpus Christi. Luther knew it in a version which first appeared at the end of the 14th century in a processional from the Franciscan monastery Miltenberg, made in Mainz, at the end of the 14th century:

God siy gelobbet und gebenedyet
der uns alle hait gespysset
mydt synem fleysch, undt synem blude,
das gibbe unß lieber herre got zu gude
das heylge sacramente
an unßerm lesten ende
uß des gewyten priesters hende.
Kyrie eleyson.

O herre dorc dynen heilgen fronlychnam,
der von dyner mutter marien quam,
und das heilige bludt
nu hilff unß herre uß aller unßir noydt.
Kyrie eleyson.

Luther praised the Leise in his writing Von der Winkelmesse und Pfaffenweihe in 1533, appreciating that it is focused on the sacrament of bread and wine, not on sacrifice. He made it a song of thanks after communion, by shortening the text for a first stanza and by adding two stanzas. The second stanza mentions the anamnesis of the gifts of redemption, the third stanza is a prayer for spiritual fruits of the sacrament for the individual life of the Christian, and for the community.

Luther's version appeared in the Erfurt Enchiridion of 1524 and in Johann Walter's choral hymnal Eyn geystlich Gesangk Buchleyn the same year. In the current German hymnal Evangelisches Gesangbuch, it appears as EG 214.

== Lyrics ==
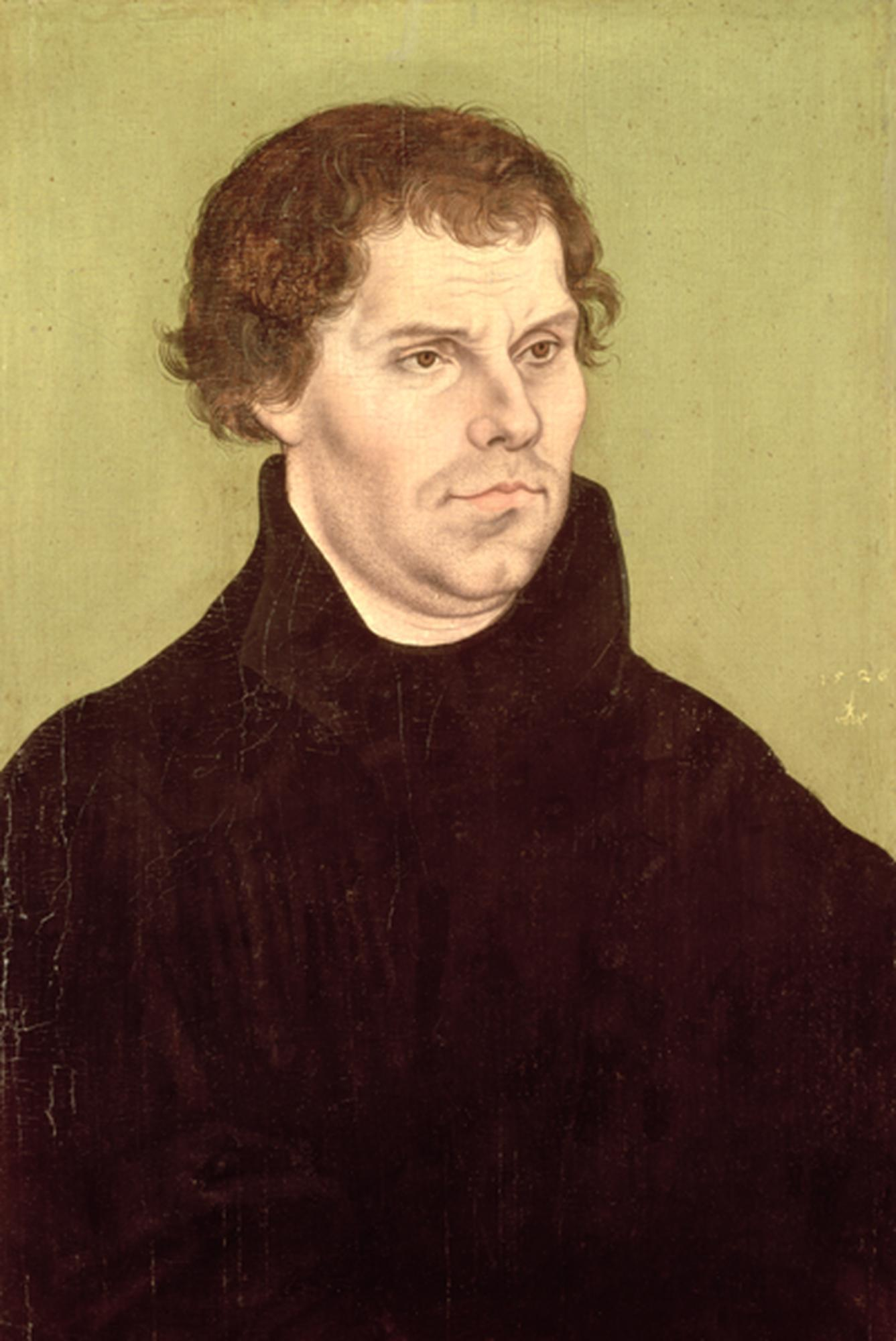
Luther in 1526

The hymn is in three stanzas of eight lines each, with "Kyrieleis" repeated every four lines.

Gott sei gelobet und gebenedeiet,
der uns selber hat gespeiset
mit seinem Fleische und mit seinem Blute;
das gib uns, Herr Gott, zugute.
Kyrieleison.
Herr, du nahmest menschlichen Leib an,
der von deiner Mutter Maria kam.
Durch dein Fleisch und dein Blut
hilf uns, Herr, aus aller Not.
Kyrieleison.

Der heilig Leib, der ist für uns gegeben
zum Tod, dass wir dadurch leben.
Nicht größre Güte konnte er uns schenken,
dabei wir sein solln gedenken.
Kyrieleison.
Herr, dein Lieb so groß dich zwungen hat,
dass dein Blut an uns groß Wunder tat
und bezahlt unsre Schuld,
dass uns Gott ist worden hold.
Kyrieleison.

Gott geb uns allen seiner Gnade Segen,
dass wir gehn auf seinen Wegen
in rechter Lieb und brüderlicher Treue,
dass uns die Speis nicht gereue.
Kyrieleison.
Herr, dein Heilig Geist uns nimmer lass,
der uns geb zu halten rechte Maß,
dass dein arm Christenheit
leb in Fried und Einigkeit.
Kyrieleison.

== Music ==
Johann Walter published a four-part setting of the melody in Eyn geystlich Gesangk Buchleyn in 1524. Johann Sebastian Bach composed a four-part setting, BWV 322.

== Catholic version ==
Luther's first stanza, including his redaction, appeared in a Catholic hymnal by the Dominican Michael Vehe, New Gesangbüchlin Geistlicher Lieder, in Halle in 1537. In this hymnal, the song is continued by four more stanzas which are attributed to Caspar Querhammer. This version entered several subsequent hymnals.

In the 20th century, a new version appeared in hymnals such as Kirchenlied, which took Luther's first stanza unchanged, but the second half of his second and third stanza replaced each time by the second half of the first, as a refrain. At first, Luther's name was not mentioned, instead only "16th century". This version was included in the first common Catholic hymnal in German, Gotteslob, of 1975 (as GL 494), now mentioning Luther's name, and was kept in the following edition, Gotteslob, as GL 215.

== See also ==
- List of hymns by Martin Luther
