= Wilhelmina Koch =

German composer

Wilhelmina (Mina or Minna) Amalie Koch (22 February 1845 – 6 March 1924) was a German composer of sacred and secular song melodies, biblical motets and choral and instrumental music. She is one of only four women that have had compositions included in the Protestant hymnal.

== Biography ==
Mina Koch was born in Waldböckelheim. She was the second of six children of Waldböckelheim pastor Karl August Schapper (1815–1898). She spent her childhood in Münster am Stein and in Koblenz. When she was eleven years old her mother Schapper Amalie née Weinrich (1816–1856) died.

In 1860 her father became the Professor and Director of the Royal Theological Seminary and Superintendent for Wittenberg. The family moved there to a big house at the parish church square where Johann Bugenhagen had lived and where Martin Luther and Philipp Melanchthon had met. Mina Koch spent the first years there in a girls' school in Droyßig at Zeitz, where her Confirmation was celebrated. The Wittenberg church music director and organist Carl Stein (1824–1902) gave her music theory and harmony lessons.

On 27 April 1865 she was married to August Koch (1836–1910) in the Wittenberg church with her father officiating. Mina Koch became the mother of ten children, two of whom died in their early years. In 1876 her family moved to Elberfeld in the Bergisches Land, where August Koch received a parish of the Lutheran Church and later became the superintendent in office. During a visit in 1887 to her brother Karl, pastor at Groß Möringen near Stendal and husband of Johanna, a daughter of the court chaplain and parish priest Adolf Krummacher (1824–1884), she composed the tune to Krummacher's poem "Stern, auf den ich schaue" (Star that I look upon). At the age of fifty years Mina Koch went blind.

After his retirement in 1906, August Koch moved the couple to Wernigerode. He died in 1910, and at the age of 78 years, Mina Koch moved to live with her youngest daughter in Stolp, Pomerania. A year later she died on 12 March 1924 in Stolp and was buried in Wernigerode at the side of her husband.
