= Albert Knapp =

German poet and animal welfare activist

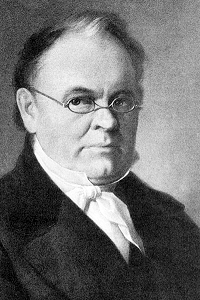
- Born: 25 July 1798; Tübingen
- Died: 18 June 1864 (aged 65); Stuttgart
- Occupations: Poet, animal welfare activist

Albert Knapp (25 July 1798, Tübingen - 18 June 1864, Stuttgart) was a German poet and animal welfare activist.

== Biography ==
He studied theology at Tübingen, became vicar in Feuerbach (1820) and filled other positions until he made a reputation in the Hospitalkirche at Stuttgart (1836). After becoming pastor at Stuttgart, he had applied himself to poetry, especially to the composition of hymns and other poetry of a religious character. Rev. Knapp is also distinguished as an important figure in the history of the animal welfare movement in Germany. In 1837, he established the Stuttgart Society, the first German animal protection organisation in Stuttgart.

== Writings ==
He published his hymns annually in a small volume between 1833 and 1853, under the title of Christoterpe. Among his other publications in verse are three collections of poems (Stuttgart: Christliche gedichten, 1829; Neuern gedichte, 1834; and Gedichte, neueste Folge, 1843); Evangelischer Liederschatz für Kirche und Haus (“Evangelical treasury of songs for church and home,” 1837; 3d ed., 1865), a collection taken from the liturgies and hymns of every Christian century, to which Christenlieder (1841) is a supplement; and the cycles Hohenstauffen (1839) and Bilder der Vorwelt (1862).

He also wrote prose: Das Leben von Ludwig Hofacker. See also Gesammelten prosaischen Schriften (“Collected prose,” 1870-75; published posthumously).
