= Michael Vehe =

German monk and theologian

- Born: 1485; Biberach an der Riß, Germany
- Died: April 1539; Halle (Saale), Germany
- Occupations: Monk; Writer
- Theological work
- Language: de

Michael Vehe (c. 1480–1539) was a German monk and theologian.

== Life ==
Vehe was born in Biberach (now part of Heilbronn, near Bad Wimpfen). He joined the Dominicans in Wimpfen and was sent to Heidelberg in 1506, where he taught in 1512 and received a doctorate in theology in 1513. In 1515 he was appointed regent of the Dominican house of studies at Heidelberg; later Cardinal Albert of Mainz chose him as theologian and put him in charge of the church of Halle, Saxony. He was summoned to Augsburg in 1530 to refute the Lutheran Confession of Faith and took a prominent part in a debate against the Lutherans in 1534 in Leipzig. He was called to the bishopric of Halberstadt on February 21, 1539. He died in Halle in April 1539.

== Works ==
Some Catholic commentators view Vehe's writings as the best apologetical treatises that appeared in Germany during the sixteenth century. His works include the following:

- Von dem Gesatz der Niessung des h. hochw. Sacraments (Leipzig, 1531) and Errettung derbeschuldigten kelchdieb (Leipzig, 1535), on Communion under one species
- Wie unterschieldlicher wiess Gott und seine heiligen sollen geehret werden (Leipzig, 1532), a treatise on the veneration of the saints
- Assertio sacrorum quorumdam axiomatum (Leipzig, 1537), on the point controverted by the Reformers

Vehe is also known for having published the first Catholic hymnbook with music, in collaboration with other Catholic dignitaries and musicians from Halle. Ein new Gesangbüchlin geystlicher Lieder (Leipzig, 1537) drew both from medieval Church tradition and the contemporary Protestant tradition, as well as presenting some new material, such as the first Catholic psalm paraphrases. The songs in Vehe's collection eventually formed the basis for all later Catholic hymnals.
