= Erfreut euch, ihr Herzen, BWV 66 =

Church cantata by Johann Sebastian Bach

Erfreut euch, ihr Herzen
- BWV: 66.2; 66
- Church cantata by J. S. Bach
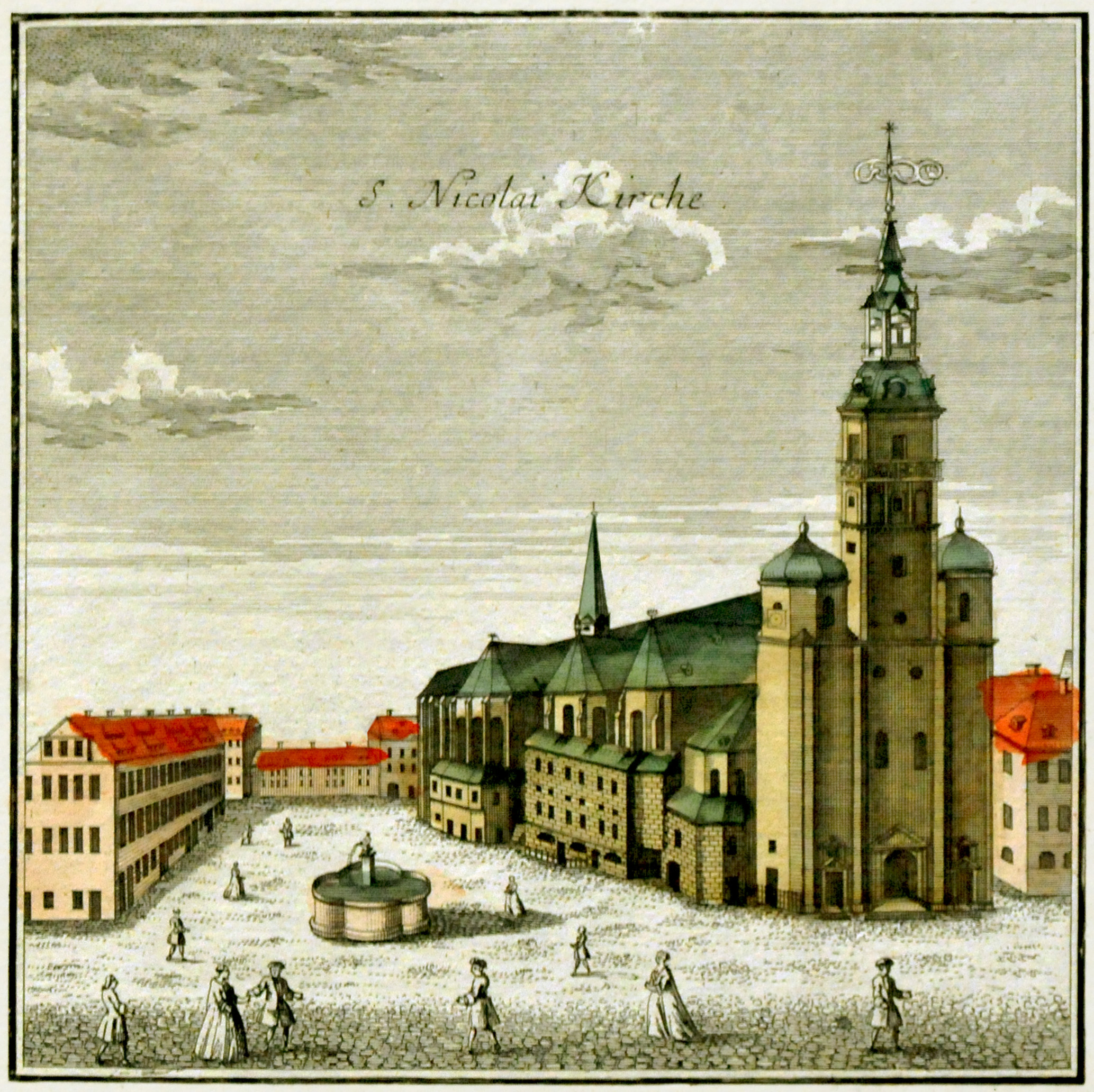
- Nikolaikirche, Leipzig, 1749 engraving
- Related: Based on BWV 66.1
- Occasion: Second Day of Easter
- Chorale: Part of "Christ ist erstanden"
- Performed: 10 April 1724: Leipzig
- Movements: 6
- Vocal: SATB choir; solo: alto, tenor and bass
- Instrumental: trumpet; 2 oboes; bassoon; 2 violins; viola; continuo

Erfreut euch, ihr Herzen (Rejoice, you hearts), BWV 66.2, BWV 66, is a church cantata for Easter by Johann Sebastian Bach. He composed it for the Second Day of Easter in Leipzig and first performed it on 10 April 1724. He based it on his congratulatory cantata Der Himmel dacht auf Anhalts Ruhm und Glück, BWV 66.1, first performed in Köthen on 10 December 1718.

The prescribed readings for the second of three Easter feast days included the narration of the Road to Emmaus. The cantata was Bach's first composition for Easter as Thomaskantor in Leipzig. He derived it from his earlier Serenata, which had a similar celebratory mood. An unknown librettist solved the problem that Bach's congratulatory cantata was a dialogue of tenor and alto by retaining a dialogue in three movements, assigned to Hope and Fear. They represent different attitudes to the news of the Resurrection of Jesus, which may be found in the two disciples, discussing the events on their walk, but also within the listener of the cantata.

Bach structured the cantata in six movements, an exuberant choral opening, a set of recitative and aria for bass, another such set for alto and tenor, and a closing chorale taken from the medieval Easter hymn "Christ ist erstanden". A Baroque instrumental ensemble included trumpet, two oboes, bassoon, strings and continuo. The music expresses moods of mourning and fear which should be overcome, but especially exhilarating joy.

== History and words ==
In 1723, Bach was appointed as Thomaskantor (director of church music) in Leipzig. He was employed by the town of Leipzig to this position, which made him responsible for the music at four churches and for the training and education of boys singing in the Thomanerchor. Cantata music had to be provided for two major churches, Thomaskirche (St. Thomas) and Nikolaikirche (St. Nicholas), simpler church music for two others, Neue Kirche (New Church) and Peterskirche (St. Peter). Bach took office in the middle of the liturgical year, on the first Sunday after Trinity. In his first twelve months in office, Bach decided to compose new works for almost all liturgical events. These works became known as his first cantata cycle.

Erfreut euch, ihr Herzen for the Second Day of Easter ("den zweiten Osterfesttag") is Bach's first composition for Easter in Leipzig, written in his first year in office. The day before, on Easter Sunday of 1724, he had performed Christ lag in Todes Banden, BWV 4, which he had composed much earlier in his career. The new cantata was derived from his earlier secular work, the Serenata Der Himmel dacht auf Anhalts Ruhm und Glück composed in Köthen. On the Third Day of Easter of 1724 he performed Ein Herz, das seinen Jesum lebend weiß, BWV 134, which he derived in a similar way from Die Zeit, die Tag und Jahre macht, BWV 134a, a cantata to celebrate the New Year's Day of 1719 in Köthen.

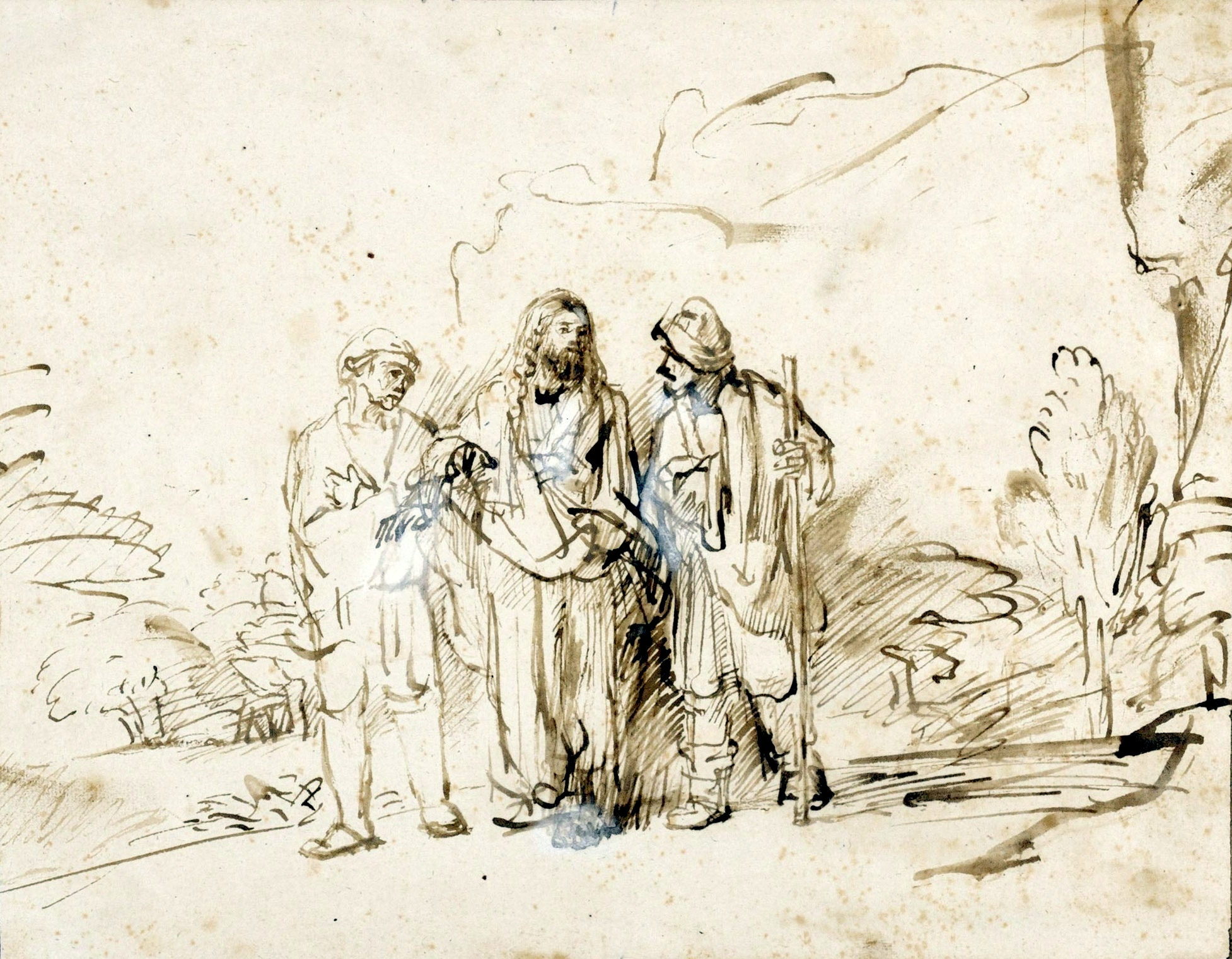
Christ with Two Disciples, by Rembrandt

The prescribed readings for the feast day were from the Acts of the Apostles, the sermon of Peter (Acts 10:34–43), and from the Gospel of Luke, the Road to Emmaus (Luke 24:13–35). An unknown librettist faced the problem that Bach's congratulatory cantata was written as a dialogue of tenor and alto. He kept the dialogue in three movements, in the middle section of the opening chorus and two duets, assigning the "roles" Hope ("Zuversicht", later "Hoffnung") and Fear ("Schwachheit", later "Furcht") to the voices. The text reflects these different reactions to the news of the Resurrection of Jesus, which might be attributed both, to the two disciples, discussing the events on their walk, and to the listener of the cantata.

Bach first performed the cantata at the Nikolaikirche on 10 April 1724. He performed the cantata again in Leipzig, on 26 March 1731 and probably on 11 April 1735.

== Music ==
=== Structure and scoring ===
Bach structured the cantata in six movements. He used the final movement of the earlier work for the opening movement of the Easter cantata: The following four movements remained in the same sequence, the other movements were replaced by a closing chorale. The outer movements are choral, framing recitatives and arias of the soloists, one set of recitative and aria as a duet. Bach scored the work for three vocal soloists (alto (A), tenor (T) and bass (B)), a four-part choir, and a Baroque instrumental ensemble: trumpet (Tr), two oboes (Ob), two violins (Vl), viola (Va), and basso continuo (Bc) including bassoon (Fg). The duration of the piece has been stated as 32 minutes.

In the following table of the movements, the scoring follows the Neue Bach-Ausgabe. The keys and time signatures are taken from the book by Bach scholar Alfred Dürr, using the symbol for common time (4/4). The instruments are shown separately for winds and strings, while the continuo, playing throughout, is not shown.

Movements of Erfreut euch, ihr Herzen
No.	Title	Text	Type	Vocal	Winds	Strings	Key	Time
1	Erfreut euch, ihr Herzen	anon.	Chorus	A T SATB	Tr 2Ob Fg	2Vl Va	D major	3/8
2	Es bricht das Grab und damit unsre Not	anon.	Recitative	B		2Vl Va		common time
3	Lasset dem Höchsten ein Danklied erschallen	anon.	Aria	B	2Ob Fg	2Vl Va	D major	3/8
4	Bei Jesu Leben freudig sein	anon.	Duet recitative	A T				common time
5	Ich furchte zwar/nicht des Grabes Finsternissen	anon.	Aria	A T		Vl solo	A major	12/8
6	Alleluja	Luther	Chorale	SATB	Tr 2Ob Fg	2Vl Va	F-sharp minor	common time

=== Movements ===
==== 1 ====
The exuberant first movement was derived from the final movement of the secular cantata. It opens with a virtuoso orchestral introduction of 24 measures, depicting vital joy. First the alto shouts: "Erfreut euch, ihr Herzen" (Rejoice, you hearts), the tenor continues "Entweichet, ihr Schmerzen" (fade away, you sorrows), then all voices proclaim in homophony: "Es lebet der Heiland und herrschet in euch" (the Savior lives and rules within you). The middle section is given mostly to alto and tenor, who illustrate mourning and fear in a sorrowful "series of poignant descending chromatic passages and suspensions", although the words speak of the chasing away these moods: "Ihr könnet verjagen das Trauren, das Fürchten, das ängstliche Zagen" (You can drive away mourning, fear, anxious despair).

Incipit of the similar music in Bach's St Matthew Passion

The continuo plays repeated "trembling" notes, a "heartbeat" as Bach would use later in the tenor recitative "O Schmerz! Hier zittert das gequälte Herz" (O pain! Here trembleth the tormented heart).of his St Matthew Passion. Finally the choir enters, one voice after the other building a chord, gently adding words of consolation: "Der Heiland erquicket sein geistliches Reich" (the Savior revives his spiritual kingdom). The instruments throw in motifs of the introduction, leading to the recapitulation of the first section. The movement has been termed "one of the longest and most exhilarating of Bach’s early works".

==== 2 ====
The bass summarizes in a short recitative, accompanied by the strings: "Es bricht das Grab und damit unsre Not" (The grave is broken and with it our suffering).

==== 3 ====
The bass continues in an aria, "Lasset dem Höchsten ein Danklied erschallen" (Let a song of thanks ring forth to the Highest). Music in dancing motion complements a general request to thank God in song. The middle section juxtaposes a long note over six measures on "Frieden" (peace) and coloraturas on "lebe" (live).

==== 4 ====
Movement four is begun by the tenor (Hope), who also wants to sing of victory and thanks ("ein Sieg- und Danklied"). He starts it "Mein Auge sieht den Heiland auferweckt" (My eye beholds the Savior reawakened), with a long melisma showing the reawakening. But already after one measure the alto (Fear) imitates the phrase on the words "Kein Auge sieht ..." (No eye beholds ...). After singing together extendedly, the two different viewpoints are rendered in an argument, termed "a linear discourse as in conventional conversation", ended by the alto trying to believe: "Ich glaube, aber hilf mir Schwachen" (I believe, but help my weakness).

==== 5 ====
In the following duet the voices are homophonic for most of the time, but with little rhythmical differences, showing their different attitude to the darkness of the grave ("des Grabes Finsternissen"): the alto expresses "ich furchte zwar" (I truly fear) on steady long notes, whereas the tenor tells in ornamented figuration "ich furchte nicht" (I do not fear). In the continuation they also deviate only on one word, "klagete" (lamented) in the alto, "hoffete" (hoped) in the tenor. The flowing 12/8 time signature of the duet and a virtuoso solo violin are reminiscent of the original purpose of the music in the congratulatory cantata. It is most fitting for the middle section of the da capo form, when both voices agree: "Nun ist mein Herze voller Trost" (Now my heart is full of comfort).

==== 6 ====
The cantata is closed by the second part of the hymn "Christ ist erstanden", starting with a threefold Alleluja. It was derived in the 12th century from the Easter sequence Victimae paschali laudes, originally codified by Wipo of Burgundy around 1040. The verses underwent a substantial transformation by Martin Luther with the help of Johann Walter and were printed by Joseph Klug, Wittenberg, in 1533. This is the only use by Bach of "Christ ist erstanden" in a vocal work, but he used the related hymn "Christ lag in Todesbanden" in his early chorale cantata Christ lag in Todes Banden, BWV 4, and in Der Friede sei mit dir, BWV 158.

== Recordings ==
The selection is taken from the listing on the Bach Cantatas Website. Instrumental groups playing period instruments in historically informed performances are highlighted green under the header "Instr.".

Recordings of Mit Fried und Freud ich fahr dahin
Title	Conductor / Choir / Orchestra	Soloists	Label	Year	Instr.
Radio Recording - Archiv-Nr: U0-01391	Max Thurn Members of NDR Chor Members of Hamburger Rundfunkorchester	Ursula Zollenkopf; Wilhelm Kaiser; Klaus Ocker	NDR	1957	
Die Bach Kantate Vol. 29	Helmuth Rilling Gächinger Kantorei Bach-Collegium Stuttgart	Hildegard Laurich; Adalbert Kraus; Philippe Huttenlocher	Hänssler	1972	
Bach Made in Germany Vol. 4 – Cantatas VII	Hans-Joachim Rotzsch Thomanerchor Gewandhausorchester	Heidi Rieß; Eberhard Büchner; Siegfried Lorenz	Eterna	1976	
J. S. Bach: Das Kantatenwerk • Complete Cantatas • Les Cantates, Folge / Vol. 4	Gustav Leonhardt: Knabenchor Hannover; Collegium Vocale Gent; Leonhardt-Consort	Paul Esswood; Kurt Equiluz; Max van Egmond	Teldec	1977	Period
J. S. Bach: Oster-Oratorium	Philippe Herreweghe Collegium Vocale Gent	Kai Wessel; James Taylor; Peter Kooy	Harmonia Mundi France	1994	Period
J. S. Bach: Complete Cantatas Vol. 9	Ton Koopman Amsterdam Baroque Orchestra & Choir	Bernhard Landauer; Christoph Prégardien; Klaus Mertens	Antoine Marchand	1998	Period
J. S. Bach: Cantatas for the Feast of Purification of Mary	John Eliot Gardiner Monteverdi Choir English Baroque Soloists	Daniel Taylor; James Gilchrist; Stephen Varcoe	Archiv Produktion	2000	Period
Bach Edition Vol. 12 – Cantatas Vol. 4	Pieter Jan Leusink Holland Boys Choir Netherlands Bach Collegium	Sytse Buwalda; Nico van der Meel; Bas Ramselaar	Brilliant Classics	2000	Period
J. S. Bach: Cantatas – Erfreut euch, ihr Herzen BWV 66; Ein Herz, das seinen Jesum lebend weiss BWV 134; Halt im Gedächtnis Jesum Christ BWV 67	Masaaki Suzuki Bach Collegium Japan	Robin Blaze; Makoto Sakurada; Peter Kooy	BIS	2001	Period

== Cited sources ==
General

- "Erfreut euch, ihr Herzen BWV 66.2; BWV 66; BC A 56". Bach Digital website, managed by Bach Archive, SLUB, SBB and Leipzig University. 7 July 2018.

Books

- Dürr, Alfred; Jones, Richard D. P. (2006). "1.22 Easter Monday". The Cantatas of J. S. Bach: With Their Librettos in German-English Parallel Text. Oxford University Press. pp. 274–278. ISBN 978-0-19-929776-4.

Online sources

- Bischof, Walter F. (2010). "BWV 66 Erfreut euch, ihr Herzen". University of Alberta.
- Braatz, Thomas; Oron, Aryeh (2011). "Chorale Melodies used in Bach's Vocal Works / Christ ist erstanden". Bach Cantatas Website.
- Dellal, Pamela (2012). "BWV 66 – Erfreut euch, ihr Herzen". Emmanuel Music.
- Gardiner, John Eliot (2007). Johann Sebastian Bach (1685-1750) / Cantatas Nos 4, 6, 31, 66, 134 & 145 (Media notes). Soli Deo Gloria (at Hyperion Records website).
- Mincham, Julian (2010). "Chapter 48 Bwv 66 – The Cantatas of Johann Sebastian Bach". jsbachcantatas.com.
- Oron, Aryeh (2016). "Cantata BWV 66 Erfreut euch, ihr Herzen". Bach Cantatas Website.
- Quinn, John (2007). "Johann Sebastian Bach (1685-1750) / The Bach Cantata Pilgrimage - Volume 22 / Cantatas for Easter". musicweb-international.com.
