= Christ ist erstanden (disambiguation) =

Christ ist erstanden (Christ is risen) is a German Easter hymn and is possibly the oldest Christian liturgical German song.

It can also refer to:

- "Christ ist erstanden" (Schütz), SWV 470, a sacred choral work by Heinrich Schütz, a setting of the German Easter hymn "Christ ist erstanden".
- "Christus ist erstanden", German version of "Christ the Lord Is Risen Again!", a German Christian hymn written by Michael Weisse in 1531 based on an earlier Bohemian hymn of the same name. It was translated into English in 1858 by Catherine Winkworth.
- "Christus ist erstanden! O tönt" (Christ is risen! O sound), a Catholic hymn for Easter written as a paraphrase of the Easter sequence Victimae paschali laudes, and appeared in 1816 by Johann Weinzierl. A melody was composed by Paul Schniebel in 1826.
- Various compositions by Gottfried Vopelius including:
  - Erstanden ist der heilige Christ, See Gottfried Vopelius#p. 279
  - "Christus ist erstanden von des todesbanden". See Gottfried Vopelius#p. 286
  - "Christ ist erstanden von der marter". See Gottfried Vopelius#p. 290

== See also ==
- "Christ the Lord Is Risen Again!" (German title: "Christus ist erstanden") is a German Christian hymn written by Michael Weisse in 1531 based on an earlier Bohemian hymn of the same name. It was translated into English in 1858 by Catherine Winkworth.
- "Christ the Lord Is Risen Today, written by Charles Wesley, the co-founder of the Methodist Church, in 1739 where it was initially titled "Hymn for Easter Day". He based it on an older anonymous Bohemian hymn titled "Jesus Christ is Risen Today"
