= Christ lag in Todes Banden, BWV 4 =

Cantata by Johann Sebastian Bach

Christ lag in Todes Banden
- BWV 4
- Chorale cantata by J. S. Bach
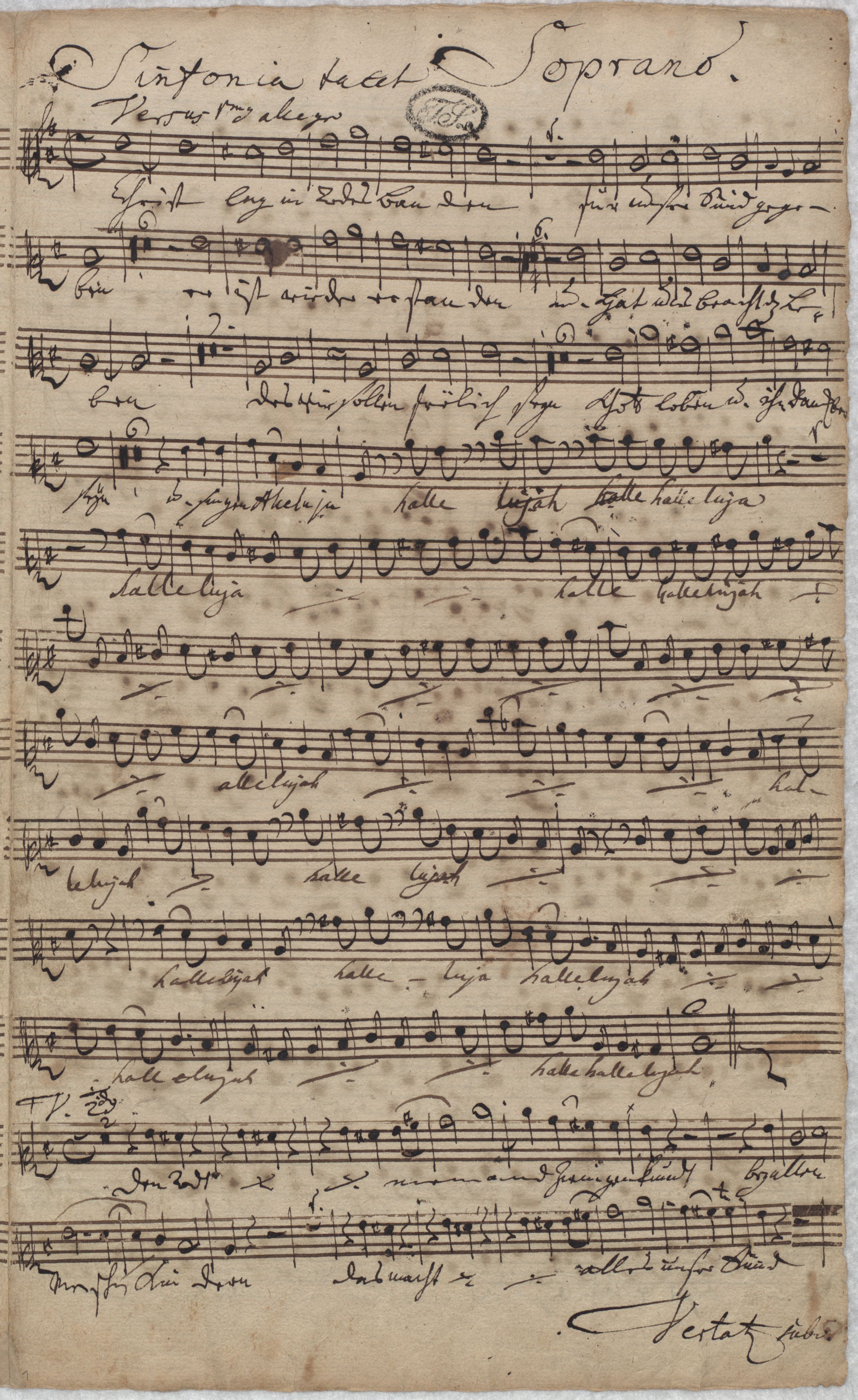
- Soprano part from opening chorus with text in Bach's own hand, St. Thomas Church, Leipzig, 1724/1725
- Key: E minor
- Occasion: First Day of Easter
- Chorale: "Christ lag in Todes Banden" by Martin Luther
- Performed: 24 April 1707
- Published: 1851
- Duration: About 20 minutes
- Movements: 8
- Vocal: SATB
- Instrumental: Cornetto; 3 trombones; 2 violins; 2 violas; continuo

Christ lag in Todes Banden (also spelled Todesbanden; (Note: The two-word version was Luther's original and has again been adopted by the NBA.) "Christ lay in death's bonds" or "Christ lay in the snares of death"), BWV 4, is a cantata for Easter by German composer Johann Sebastian Bach, one of his earliest church cantatas. It is agreed to be an early work partly for stylistic reasons and partly because there is evidence that it was probably written for a performance in 1707. Bach went on to complete many other works in the same genre, contributing complete cantata cycles for all occasions of the liturgical year. John Eliot Gardiner described it as Bach's "first-known attempt at painting narrative in music".

Christ lag in Todes Banden is a chorale cantata, a style in which both text and music are based on a hymn. In this instance, the source was Martin Luther's hymn of the same name, the main hymn for Easter in the Lutheran church. The composition is based on the seven stanzas of the hymn and its tune, which was derived from Medieval models. Bach used the unchanged words of a stanza of the chorale in each of the seven vocal movements, in the format of chorale variations per omnes versus (for all stanzas), and he used its tune as a cantus firmus. After an opening sinfonia, the variations are arranged symmetrically: chorus–duet–solo–chorus–solo–duet–chorus, with the focus on the central fourth stanza about the battle between Life and Death. All movements are in E minor, and Bach achieves variety and intensifies the meaning of the text through many musical forms and techniques.

Christ lag in Todes Banden is Bach's first cantata for Easter – in fact, his only extant original composition for the first day of the feast – and his earliest surviving chorale cantata. It was related to his application for a post at a Lutheran church at Mühlhausen. He later twice performed it as Thomaskantor in Leipzig, beginning in 1724 when he first celebrated Easter there. Only this second version survives. It is scored for four vocal parts and a Baroque instrumental ensemble with two components, an instrumental "choir" of cornetto and three trombones doubling the choral voices (only in the 2nd Leipzig performance in 1725 were these used), and a string section of two violins, two violas, and continuo. While this scoring reflects the resources at Bach's disposal (the cornetto and brass players would have been available because of the city band tradition in Leipzig), it was old-fashioned and exemplifies a 17th-century Choralkonzert (chorale concerto) style; the lost scoring of the earlier performances was perhaps similar.

Gardiner calls Bach's setting of Luther's hymn "a bold, innovative piece of musical drama", and observes "his total identification with the spirit and letter of Luther's fiery, dramatic hymn".

== Composition history ==
=== Background ===
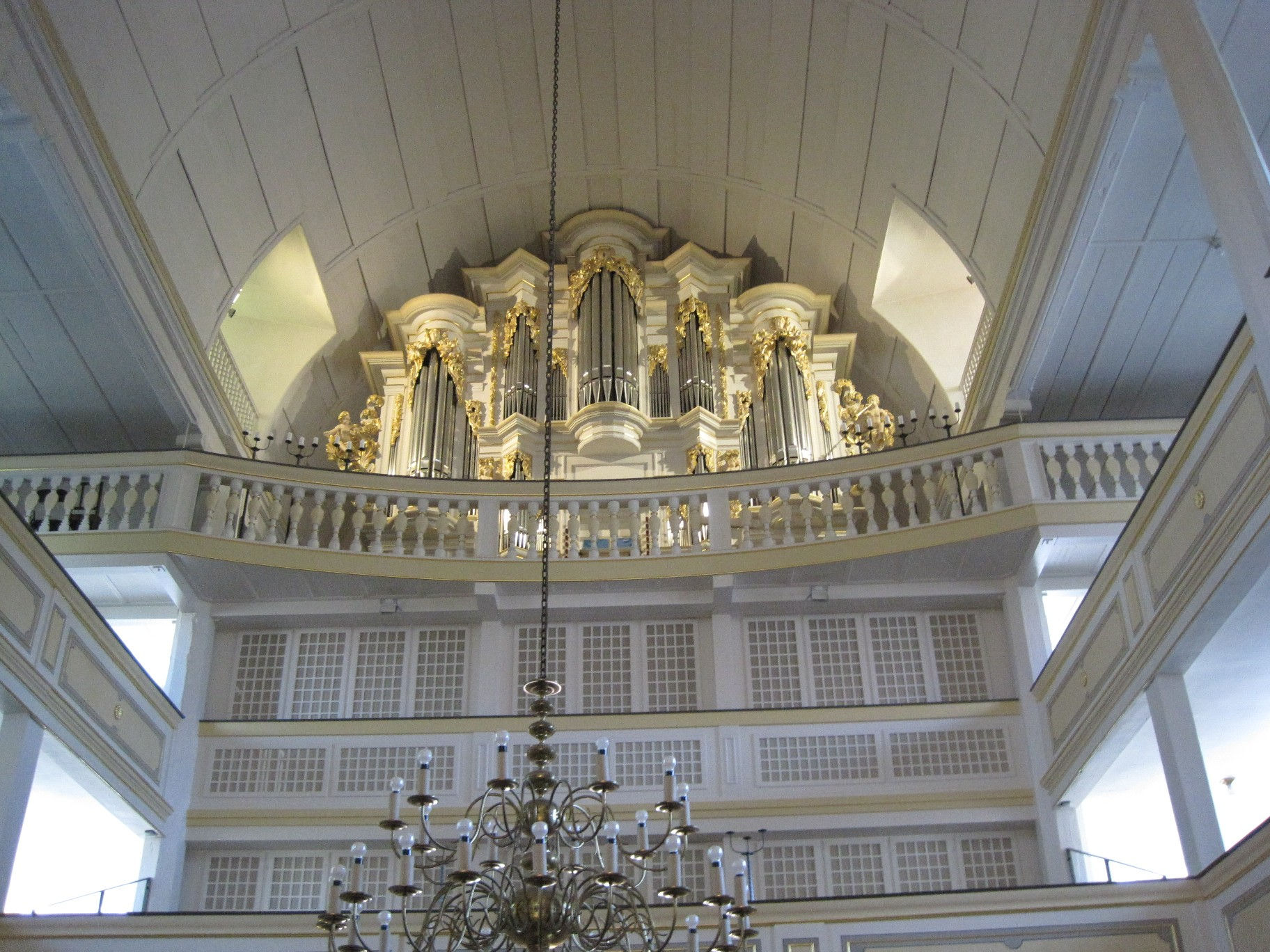
The restored Wender organ which Bach played in Arnstadt at the New Church (now the Bach Church)

Bach is believed to have written Christ lag in Todes Banden in 1707. He was a professional organist aged 22, employed from 1703 in Arnstadt as the organist of the New Church (which replaced the burned Bonifatiuskirche, and is today known as the Bach Church). At age 18, he had inspected the new organ built by Johann Friedrich Wender, was invited to play one Sunday, and was hired. The organ was built on the third tier of a theatre-like church. Bach's duties as a church musician involved some responsibility for choral music, but the exact year he began composing cantatas is unknown. Christ lag in Todes Banden is one of a small group of cantatas that survive from his early years. According to the musicologist Martin Geck, many details of the score reflect "organistic practice".

In Arnstadt, the Kantor (church musician) Heindorff was responsible for church music in the Upper Church and the New Church where Bach was the organist. He typically conducted music in the Upper Church and would appoint a choir prefect for vocal music in the New Church. Musicologist Christoph Wolff notes that "subjecting his works to the questionable leadership of a prefect" was not what Bach would have done. Therefore, most cantatas of the period are not for Sunday occasions, but restricted to special occasions such as weddings and funerals. Christ lag in Todes Banden is the only exception, but was most likely composed not for Arnstadt but for an application to a more important post at the church of Divi Blasii in Mühlhausen.

=== Bach's early cantatas ===
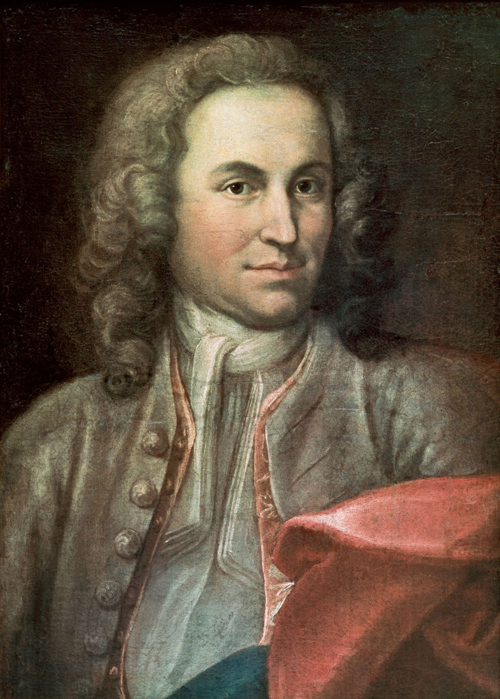
Portrait of the young Bach (disputed)

Bach's early cantatas are Choralkonzerte (chorale concertos) in the style of the 17th century, different from the recitative and aria cantata format associated with Neumeister that Bach started to use for church cantatas in 1714. Wolff points out the relation of Bach's early cantatas to works by Dieterich Buxtehude, with whom Bach had studied in Lübeck. Christ lag in Todes Banden shows similarities to a composition of Johann Pachelbel based on the same Easter chorale. Although there is no evidence that Bach and Pachelbel met, Bach grew up in Thuringia while Pachelbel was based in the same region, and Bach's elder brother and teacher Johann Christoph Bach studied with Pachelbel in Erfurt. Another of Pachelbel's works appears to be referenced in the early Bach cantata Nach dir, Herr, verlanget mich, BWV 150, and there has been recent speculation that Bach wanted to pay tribute to Pachelbel after his death in 1706.

The texts for Bach's early cantatas were drawn mostly from Biblical passages and hymns. Features characteristic of his later cantatas, such as recitatives and arias on contemporary poetry, were not yet present, although Bach may have heard them in oratorios by Buxtehude, or even earlier. Instead, these early cantatas include 17th-century elements such as motets and chorale concertos. They often begin with an instrumental sinfonia or sonata (sonatina). The following table lists the seven extant works composed by Bach until 1708, when he moved on to the Weimar court.

Bach's early cantatas
Date	Occasion	BWV	Incipit	Text source
1707?	Penitence	150	Nach dir, Herr, verlanget mich	Psalm 25, anon.
1707?	Easter	4	Christ lag in Todes Banden	Luther
1707?	Penitence	131	Aus der Tiefen rufe ich, Herr, zu dir	Psalm 130
1 Jan 1708?	New Year's Day	143	Lobe den Herrn, meine Seele	mainly Psalm 146, two stanzas of Jakob Ebert's hymn "Du Friedefürst, Herr Jesu Christ"
4 Feb 1708	Inauguration of the town council	71	Gott ist mein König	mainly Psalm 74, with added biblical quotations
5 Jun 1708?	Wedding?	196	Der Herr denket an uns	Psalm 115:12–15
16 Sep 1708?	Funeral	106	Gottes Zeit ist die allerbeste Zeit (Actus tragicus)	compilation of seven biblical quotations, three hymns and free poetry

Bach uses the limited types of instruments at his disposal for unusual combinations, such as two recorders and two viole da gamba in the funeral cantata Gottes Zeit ist die allerbeste Zeit, also known as Actus Tragicus. He uses instruments of the continuo group as independent parts, such as a cello in Nach dir, Herr, verlanget mich and a bassoon in Der Herr denket an uns. The cantata for the inauguration of a town council is richly scored for trumpets, woodwinds and strings. Wolff notes:

The overall degree of mastery by which these early pieces compare favourably with the best church compositions from the first decade of the eighteenth century ... proves that the young Bach did not confine himself to playing organ and clavier, but, animated by his Buxtehude visit, devoted considerable time and effort to vocal composition. The very few such early works that exist, each a masterpiece in its own right, must constitute a remnant only ... of a larger body of similar compositions.

The Bach scholar Richard D. P. Jones notes in The Creative Development of Johann Sebastian Bach:

His remarkable flair for text illustration is evident even in the early cantatas, particularly the two finest of them, the Actus tragicus, BWV 106, and Christ lag in Todes Banden, BWV 4. We already sense a powerful mind behind the notes in the motivic unity of the early cantatas, in the use of reprise to bind their mosaic forms together ...

=== Readings and chorale ===
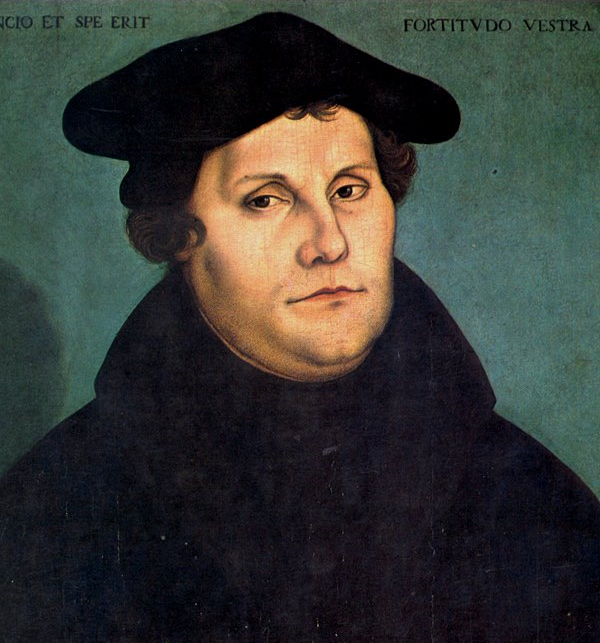
Portrait of Martin Luther, c. 1529. Luther wrote the text of the hymn and derived the melody from a traditional older tune.

The prescribed readings for the feast day were from the First letter to the Corinthians ("Christ is our Easter lamb" – 1 Corinthians 5:6–8) and from the Gospel of Mark (the Resurrection of Jesus – Mark 16:1–8).

The reformer Martin Luther wrote several hymns in German to be used in church services. His hymn "Christ lag in Todes Banden" was based on the Latin hymn "Victimae Paschali Laudes", and first published in 1524. It became a main Easter hymn in German Lutheranism. The hymn stresses the struggle between Life and Death. The third stanza refers to the "sting of death", as mentioned in 1 Corinthians 15. The fifth stanza relates to the "Osterlamm", the Paschal Lamb. The sacrificial "blood" ("Its blood marks our doors") refers to the marking of the doors before the exodus from Egypt. The final stanza recalls the tradition of baking and eating Easter Bread, with the "old leaven" alluding again to the exodus, in contrast to the "Word of Grace", concluding "Christ would ... alone nourish the soul." In contrast to most chorale cantatas that Bach composed later in Leipzig, the text of the chorale is retained unchanged, which he did again only in late chorale cantatas.

=== Performances ===
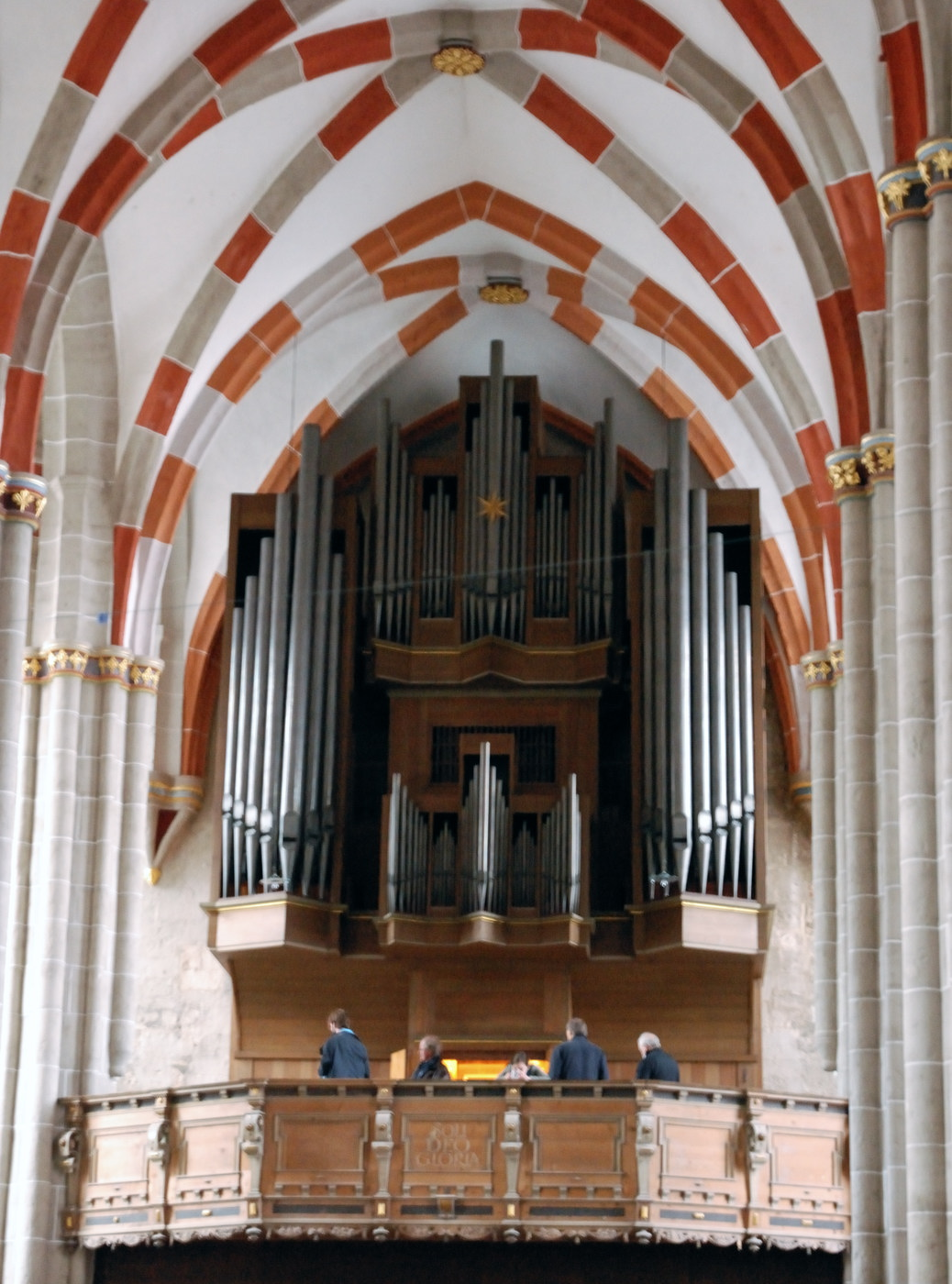
Organ of Divi Blasii in Mühlhausen, where the cantata was possibly first performed

Christ lag in Todes Banden survives in a version from the 1720s when Bach held the position of Thomaskantor (director of church music) in Leipzig. There is documentary evidence suggesting that this Easter Sunday cantata was premiered in 1707. It is known that Bach performed a cantata of his own composition at Easter in 1707 as a part of his application for the post of organist of Divi Blasii in Mühlhausen, and this may have been Christ lag in Todes Banden. By this time, Bach was already demonstrating ingenuity in keyboard music, as known from the early works in the Neumeister Collection. Christ lag in Todes Banden is a significant milestone in his vocal music. It was completed seven years before his sequence of Weimar cantatas, begun in 1714 with Himmelskönig, sei willkommen, BWV 182, and 17 years before he started a complete annual cycle of chorale cantatas in Leipzig in the middle of 1724 with O Ewigkeit, du Donnerwort, BWV 20.

Bach would have been attracted to Mühlhausen for its status as a free imperial city and the tradition of vocal music in its churches. Wolff notes that Bach possibly sent two other cantata scores with his application, and once he knew the date of the audition may have composed Christ lag in Todes Banden in addition. A month after Easter, on 24 May 1707, an agreement was reached to hire Bach, who seems to have been the only candidate considered seriously.

Bach performed the cantata again while Thomaskantor in Leipzig, notably at his first Easter there on 9 April 1724. He also performed it the following year on 1 April 1725, in his second cycle of Leipzig cantatas, a cycle of chorale cantatas based on Lutheran hymns. It followed in the cycle some forty newly composed cantatas. This early work fits the cycle in the sense that it is based on a chorale, but its style is different from the others.

== Music ==
=== Structure and scoring ===
Bach structured the cantata in eight movements: an instrumental sinfonia and seven vocal movements corresponding to the stanzas of the hymn. The duration is given as 22 minutes.

The title of the original parts of the first Leipzig performance is (in Johann Christoph Altnickol's handwriting): "Feria Paschatos / Christ lag in Todes Banden / a.4. Voc: / Cornetto / 3 Trombon. / 2 Violini / 2 Viole / con / Continuo / Di Sign. Joh.Seb.Bach", (Note: The title of the parts in English: Feast of Easter Christ lag in Todes Banden for 4 voices, cornetto, 3 trombones, 2 violins, 2 violas with continuo.) In this late version, Bach scored the work for four vocal parts (soprano (S), alto (A), tenor (T), and bass (B)), and a Baroque instrumental ensemble consisting of strings, brass and continuo. The brass parts, a choir of cornetto (Ct) and three trombones (Tb) playing colla parte with the voices at times, may have been added in the 1720s. They may also possibly represent the original scoring, in the style of the 17th-century polychoral tradition.

The scoring of the cantata Christ lag in Todes Banden has been described as "archaic" and its style "medieval":

- The string section consists of two violin parts (Vl) and two viola parts (Va); this indicates an older practice as for instance found in 17th-century church cantatas by Bach's ancestors (see Altbachisches Archiv), and in Jesus Christus ist um unsrer Missetat willen verwundet, a Passion setting from the early 18th century (or older) which Bach had performed a few years after composing the cantata Christ lag in Todes Banden. In the first half of the 18th century the standard for a string section soon evolved to two violin parts, one viola part and continuo.
- The cornett used in the cantata was an instrument that belonged to an earlier age: by the second quarter of the 18th century it had almost entirely disappeared from Bach's compositions.
- The brass instruments were only used for the 1 April 1725 version of the work. The other performances (24 April 1707, 8 April 1708, and 9 April 1724) were performed without brass instruments (i.e., Cornetto and three Trombones).
- The first version (1707 and 1708) concluded with the words of Verse 7 of the Chorale, but the music was that of Movement 2 (Verse 1 of the Chorale). In 1724 and 1725, Bach changed this out to the now-used 4-part Chorale setting.
- There is relatively little distinction between choral sections of the cantata and sections for vocal soloists; one editor commented that the "whole cantata may be sung as chorus". This compares to the clearer demarcation between choral movements and movements for vocal soloists in Bach's later works. However, the number of voices the composer intended per part remains somewhat contentious, and recordings of the work differ considerably in the configurations deployed.
- The harmony is often modal, instead of the modern tonal system.

In the following table of the movements, the scoring and keys follow the Neue Bach-Ausgabe. The keys and time signatures are taken from the book on all cantatas by the Bach scholar Alfred Dürr, using the symbol for common time (4/4) and alla breve (2/2). The continuo, played throughout, is not shown.

Movements of Christ lag in Todes Banden, BWV 4
No.	Title	Type	Vocal	Brass	Strings	Key	Time.
1	Sinfonia				2Vl 2Va	E minor	common time
Versus 1	Christ lag in Todes Banden; Halleluja	Chorus	SATB	Ct 3Tb	2Vl 2Va	E minor	common time cut time
Versus 2	Den Tod niemand zwingen kunnt	Aria Duetto	S A	Ct Tb		E minor	common time
Versus 3	Jesus Christus, Gottes Sohn	Aria	T		2Vl	E minor	common time
Versus 4	Es war ein wunderlicher Krieg	Chorus	SATB			E minor	common time
Versus 5	Hier ist das rechte Osterlamm	Aria	B		2Vl 2Va	E minor	3/4
Versus 6	So feiern wir das hohe Fest	Aria Duetto	S T			E minor	common time
Versus 7	Wir essen und leben wohl	Chorale	SATB	Ct 3Tb	2Vl 2Va	E minor	common time

=== Hymn tune ===
Luther's hymn is based on the 12th-century Easter hymn "Christ ist erstanden" (Christ is risen), which relies both in text and melody on the sequence for Easter, Victimae paschali laudes. A new version was published by Luther in 1524 and adapted by Johann Walter in his Wittenberg hymnal for choir, Eyn geystlich Gesangk Buchleyn (1524). A slightly modified version appeared in 1533 in a hymnal by Kluge. This chorale tune would have been familiar to Bach's congregations. Bach composed other arrangements during his career, including the two chorale preludes BWV 625 and BWV 718, and the "Fantasia super Christ lag in Todes Banden", BWV 695. Bach's organ works and the version in the cantata (see below) use the passing notes and regular rhythmic patterns of the 1533 version.

=== Movements ===
Unlike in Bach's later cantatas, all movements are in the same key. The cantata begins with an instrumental sinfonia. The seven stanzas are treated in seven movements as chorale variations per omnes versus (for all stanzas), with the melody always present as a cantus firmus. All stanzas end on the word Halleluja.

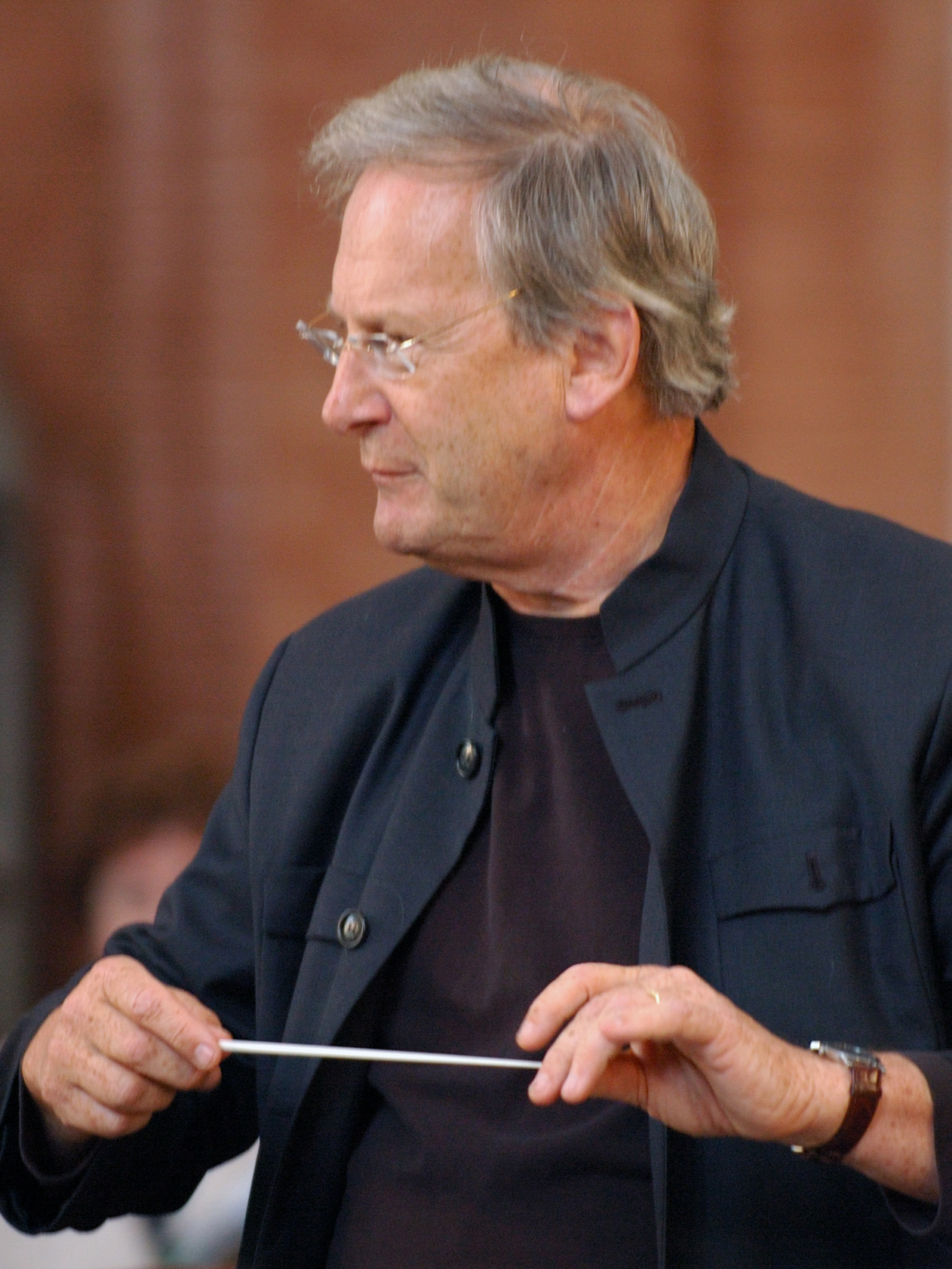
John Eliot Gardiner, who conducted the Bach Cantata Pilgrimage, in 2007

The symmetrical sequence of the seven stanzas is a feature more often found in Bach's mature compositions: chorus – duet – solo – chorus – solo – duet – chorus. The musicologist Carol Traupman-Carr notes the variety of treatment of the seven stanzas, while retaining the same key and melody:

1. Polyphonic chorale fantasia
2. Duet, with "walking bass" in continuo
3. Trio sonata
4. Polyphonic and imitative, woven around chorale melody
5. Homophonic with elaborate continuo line
6. Duet, using trio sonata texture with extensive imitation
7. Four-part chorale setting (Leipzig version)

John Eliot Gardiner, who conducted the Bach Cantata Pilgrimage in 2000, calls Bach's setting of Luther's hymn "a bold, innovative piece of musical drama", observing that Bach was "drawing on medieval musical roots (the hymn tune derives from the eleventh-century plainsong Victimae paschali laudes)", and noting Bach's "total identification with the spirit and letter of Luther's fiery, dramatic hymn". Bach could follow "Luther's ideal in which music brings the text to life".

==== Sinfonia ====
The cantata begins with an instrumental sinfonia a work in the style of an overture to a contemporary Venetian opera, with chordal passages and occasional polyphony. It introduces the first line of the melody. The mood is sombre, recalling the "Death's bonds" of the first line of the hymn: Christ's death on the cross and burial.

==== Versus 1 ====
The opening stanza, "Christ lag in Todes Banden" (Christ lay in death's bonds) is treated as a chorale fantasia. Without instrumental opening, the movement starts with the chorale tune sung by the soprano in very long notes, with all other parts entering soon after the soprano begins each choral statement. The alto line is derived from the chorale tune, while the viola parts principally reinforce the alto and tenor voices. The violin parts are independent and, as Traupman-Carr notes, "further activate the texture with a virtually continuous exchange of sixteenth-note snippets". The figure in the violins known as suspiratio (sigh) reflects "Christ's suffering in the grip of death".

The final Halleluja is faster, giving up the fantasia format for a four-part fugue in motet style, with all instruments doubling the voices. The style of the movement recalls the 16th-century stile antico, although the style is still unmistakably Bach's.

==== Versus 2 ====
The second stanza, "Den Tod niemand zwingen kunnt" (No one could defeat death), is set as a soprano and alto duet, over an ostinato continuo. It deals with "humanity helpless and paralysed as it awaits God's judgement against sin". Bach has the music almost freeze on the first words "den Tod" (death), and the word "gefangen" (imprisoned) is marked by a sharp dissonance between the soprano and alto. In the Halleluja, the voices imitate each other in long notes in fast succession, creating a sequence of suspensions.

==== Versus 3 ====
The third stanza, "Jesus Christus, Gottes Sohn" (Jesus Christ, God's Son), is a trio of the tenor, two obbligato violins and continuo. The tenor sings the chorale melody almost unchanged. The violins illustrate first how Christ slashes at the enemy. The music stops completely on the word "nichts" (nothing). The violins then present in four notes the outline of the cross, and finally the tenor sings a joyful "Halleluja" to a virtuoso violin accompaniment.

==== Versus 4 ====
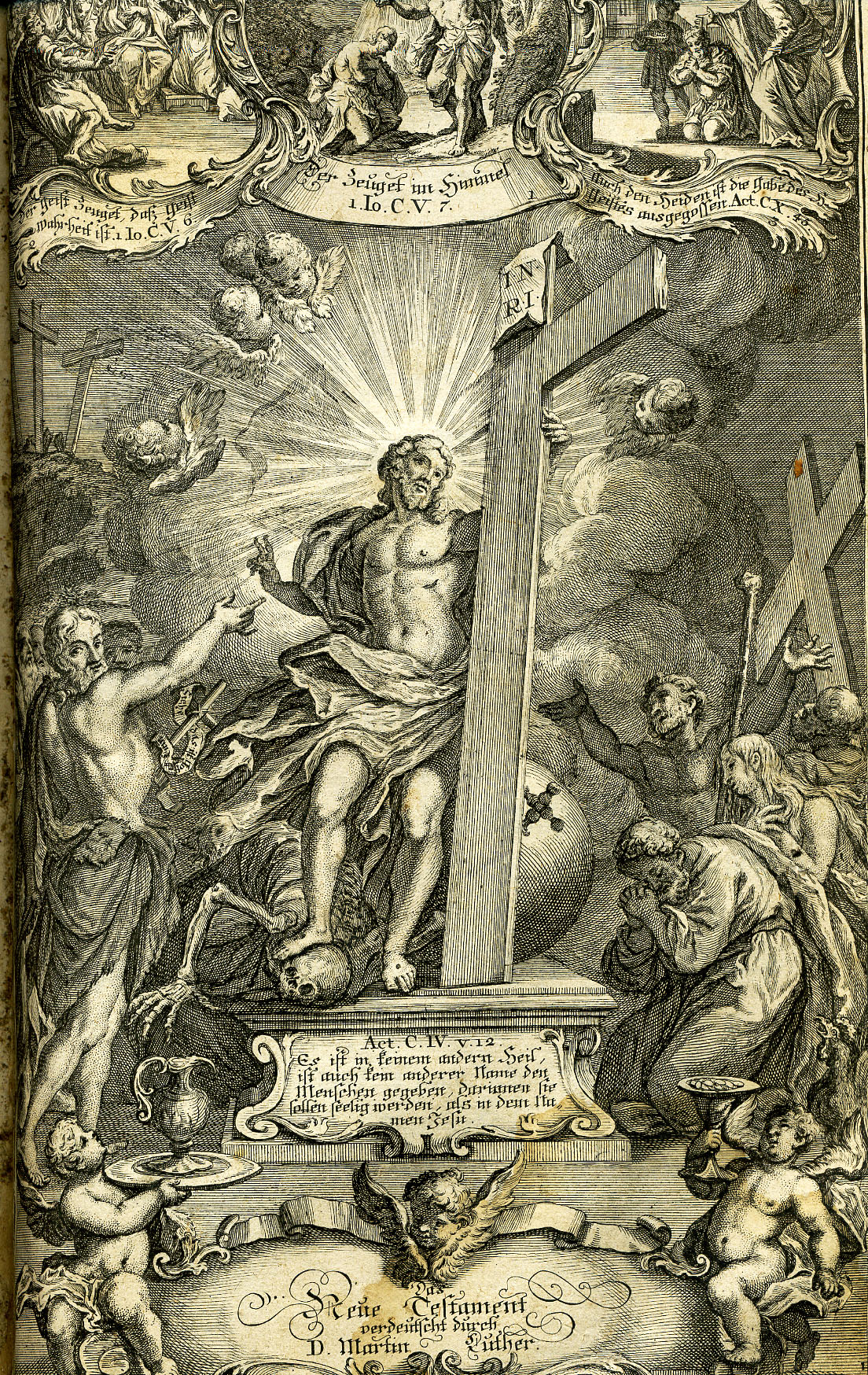
Resurrection of Jesus on the title page of a Luther Bible, 1769

"Es war ein wunderlicher Krieg, da Tod und Leben rungen" (It was a strange battle, that death and life waged), is the center of the symmetrical structure. It is sung by the four voices, accompanied only by the continuo. The alto sings the cantus firmus, transposed by a fifth to B-Dorian, while the other voices follow each other in a fugal stretto with entries just a beat apart until they fall away one by one. In the final Halleluja in all four voices, the bass descends nearly two octaves.

==== Versus 5 ====
Stanza five, "Hier ist das rechte Osterlamm" (Here is the true Easter-lamb), is sung by the bass alone, accompanied at first by a descending chromatic line in the continuo which has been compared to the Crucifixus of the Mass in B minor, but changing to "a dance-like passage of continuous eighth notes" when the voice enters. For every line of the stanza, the bass sings a chorale tune, then repeats the words in counterpoint to the part of the tune repeated in the strings, sometimes transposed. Taruskin describes this: "With its antiphonal exchanges between the singer and the massed strings ... this setting sounds like a parody of a passacaglia-style Venetian opera aria, vintage 1640". The bass sings the final victorious Hallelujas, spanning two octaves.

==== Versus 6 ====
"So feiern wir das hohe Fest" (So we celebrate the high festival), is a duet for soprano and tenor accompanied only by the ostinato continuo. The chorale is shared by the voices, with the soprano singing it in E minor, the tenor in B minor. The movement is a dance of joy: the word "Wonne" (joy) is rendered in figuration that Gardiner finds reminiscent of Purcell. Bach incorporates the solemn rhythms of the French overture into this verse, reflecting the presence of the word "feiern" (celebrate) in the text. It may be the first time that Bach used these rhythms.

==== Versus 7 ====
Bach's original setting of the final stanza, "Wir essen und leben wohl" (We eat and live well), is lost; it may have been a repeat of the opening chorus. In Leipzig, he supplied a simple four-part setting.

== Manuscripts and publication ==
Bach's original score is lost. A set of autograph parts has survived and is kept in the Bach-Archiv Leipzig. The parts were copied from the autograph score by six scribes, four of them known by name, including the composer.

A manuscript score by Franz Hauser, dating from c. 1820–1839, is held by the Staatsbibliothek zu Berlin – Preußischer Kulturbesitz. It bears a comment on page 178: "Nach den auf der Thomasschule befindlichen / Original / : Autograph: / Stimmen in Partitur gebracht. / Lp. d 16. Oct. 33. / fHauser" (After the original autograph parts in the Thomasschule, rendered in a score, Leipzig, 16 October 1833).

The cantata was first published in 1851 as No. 4 in the first volume of the Bach-Gesellschaft Ausgabe (BGA), edited by Moritz Hauptmann. Half a century later a vocal score of the cantata appeared in Novello's Original Octavo Edition, under the title Christ Lay in Death's Dark Prison. The piano reduction was by John E. West, and the translation of the cantata's text by Paul England. In 1905 this vocal score was republished in the United States by H. W. Gray. Henry S. Drinker's translation Christ lay by death enshrouded appeared in a score edited by Arnold Schering and published by Eulenburg in 1932. In 1967 Schering's score edition was republished by W. W. Norton with an extended introduction and bibliography by Gerhard Herz. Breitkopf & Härtel, the publisher of the BGA, produced various editions of the cantata separately, for instance in 1968 a vocal score with Arno Schönstedt's piano reduction and Charles Sanford Terry's translation (Christ lay in Death's grim prison).

The New Bach Edition (Neue Bach-Ausgabe, NBA) published the score in 1985, edited by Alfred Dürr, with the critical commentary published the next year. In 1995 Carus produced a revised edition of Hänssler's 1981 Christ lag in Todes Banden, edited by Reinhold Kubik. Both the Hänssler and the Carus edition contained Jean Lunn's Christ lay in death's cold prison translation. Carus followed the NBA's ... in Todes Banden spelling for the German title. In 2007 Carus republished their score edition with an introduction by Hans-Joachim Schulze. Bach Digital published high-resolution facsimile images of the autograph manuscript parts and of Hauser's score. Also in the 21st century, Serenissima Music published a vocal score of Christ lag in Todes Banden compatible with Kalmus' performance material based on the BGA.

== Modern performances and recordings ==
Bach's cantatas fell into obscurity after his death. Music from the cantata was performed as early as 1914 at the Proms (at that time held in the Queen's Hall), although the complete work was not heard in this concert series until 1978, when it was given at St Augustine's church, Kilburn.

In the context of their revival, Christ lag in Todes Banden stands out as being recorded early and having been recorded often; as of 2016, the Bach Cantatas Website lists 77 different complete recordings, the earliest dating from 1931. The first recording was a Catalan version arranged by Francesc Pujol with Lluís Millet conducting the Orfeó Català: this 1931 performance was released on three 78 rpm discs by the label "La Voz de su Amo" (His Master's Voice) in 1932. The cantata was recorded twice under the direction of Nadia Boulanger, a 1937 version recorded in Paris and a 1938 version recorded in Boston.

There are several recordings from the decades immediately after the war. Robert Shaw recorded the cantata in 1946 and again in 1959. Günther Ramin conducted the Thomanerchor in 1950, the anniversary of Bach's death. The same year, Fritz Lehmann conducted the choir of the Musikhochschule Frankfurt with soloists Helmut Krebs and Dietrich Fischer-Dieskau. Karl Richter and his Münchener Bach-Chor first recorded it in 1958.

Nikolaus Harnoncourt recorded Christ lag in Todes Banden in 1971 in a historically informed performance with original instruments and male singers (the upper two parts are sung by boys and the countertenor Paul Esswood). This was at the start of the first project to record all Bach's sacred cantatas, "J. S. Bach – Das Kantatenwerk" on Teldec. Christ lag in Todes Banden has since been included in the other "complete sets", conducted by Rilling, Gardiner, Koopman, Leusink, and Suzuki (details of these recordings are given in the discography article).

== Transcriptions ==
In 1926 Walter Rummel published a piano arrangement of the cantata's fourth movement, "Jesus Christus, Gottes Sohn". George Copeland recorded this transcription in 1938 (re-issued on CD 2001), and Jonathan Plowright recorded it in 2005.

After he had recorded his orchestration of the chorale prelude Christ lag in Todesbanden, BWV 718, in 1931, Leopold Stokowski recorded his arrangement for symphonic orchestra of BWV 4's fourth movement in 1937. As Chorale from the Easter cantata Christ lag in Todesbanden the arrangement's score was published by Broude Brothers in 1951. Later the arrangement was also recorded by José Serebrier and Robert Pikler.

== Cited sources ==
General sources

- "Christ lag in Todes Banden (early version) BWV 4; BC A 54a / Chorale cantata (1st Easter Day)". Bach digital website, managed by Bach Archive, SLUB, SBB and Leipzig University. 2014.
- "Christ lag in Todes Banden (Leipzig version) BWV 4; BC A 54a / Chorale cantata (1st Easter Day)". Bach digital website. 2014.
- "D-LEb Thomana 4". Bach digital website. 2014.
- "D-B Mus. ms. Bach P 1159/XI, Fascicle 5". Bach digital website, managed by Bach Archive, SLUB, SBB and Leipzig University. 2014.

Editions in English

- West, John E., ed. (1900–1905). Christ lay in death's dark prison. Translated by England, Paul. Novello & Co. hdl:1802/29490. OCLC 678916151.
- West, John E., ed. (1905). Christ Lay in Death's Dark Prison (Christ lag in Todesbanden): Easter Cantata. Translated by England, Paul. New York, NY: The H. W. Gray Co., Inc.
- Schering, Arnold, ed. (1932). Cantata No. 4: Christ lag in Todesbanden – Christ lay by death enshrouded. Translated by Drinker, Henry S. New York, NY: Eulenburg. OCLC 12938956.
- Hauptmann, Moritz, ed. (1933). Cantata No. 4: Christ lag in Todesbanden, BWV 4. Kalmus.
- Herz, Gerhard, ed. (1967). Cantata No. 4: Christ lag in Todesbanden: an authoritative score, backgrounds, analysis, views and comments. W. W. Norton. OCLC 2869218.
- Schönstedt, Arno, ed. (1968). Kantate Nr. 4 am Osterfest: "Christ lag in Todesbanden" – Cantata No. 4 for Easter: "Christ lay in Death's grim prison". Translated by Terry, Charles Sanford. Breitkopf & Härtel.
- Schreck, Gustav; Marissen, Michael, eds. (2012). Cantata No. 4: Christ lag in Todesbanden – BWV 4. Serenissima. ISBN 978-1-932419-48-1.

Editions

- Dürr, Alfred, ed. (1985). "Kantaten zum 1. Ostertag". Kantaten (PDF) (in German). Vol. 9. Bärenreiter. Archived from the original (PDF) on 5 June 2016.
- Kubik, Reinhold, ed. (2007). Christ lag in Todes Banden – Christ lay in death's cold prison – BWV 4 (PDF). Translated by Lunn, Jean. Carus. OCLC 762198060.

Books

- Dürr, Alfred (1971). Die Kantaten von Johann Sebastian Bach (in German). Vol. 1 (4 ed.). Deutscher Taschenbuchverlag. ISBN 3-423-04080-7.
- Dürr, Alfred (2006). The Cantatas of J. S. Bach: With Their Librettos in German-English Parallel Text. Translated by Richard D. P. Jones. Oxford University Press. ISBN 978-0-19-929776-4.
- Geck, Martin (2006). Johann Sebastian Bach: Life and Work. Translated by John Hargraves. Harcourt. ISBN 978-0-15-100648-9.
- Jones, Richard D. P. (2007). The Creative Development of Johann Sebastian Bach, Volume I: 1695–1717: Music to Delight the Spirit. Oxford University Press. ISBN 978-0-19-816440-1.
- Taruskin, Richard (2010). Music in the Seventeenth and Eighteenth Centuries. The Oxford History of Western Music. Vol. 2. New York: Oxford University Press. ISBN 978-0-19-538482-6.
- Wolff, Christoph (2002). Johann Sebastian Bach: The Learned Musician. Oxford University Press. ISBN 978-0-393-32256-9.
- Zwang, Philippe; Zwang, Gérard (2005). Guide pratique des cantates de Bach (Second revised and augmented edition.) (in French). L'Harmattan. pp. 43–44. ISBN 978-2-296-42607-8.

Online sources

- Bischof, Walter F. (2015). "BWV 4 Christ lag in Todes Banden". University of Alberta. Archived from the original on 10 May 2010.
- Bischof, Walter F. (2016). "BWV 71 Gott ist mein König". University of Alberta. Archived from the original on 7 August 2011.
- Braatz, Thomas; Oron, Aryeh (2011). "Chorale Melodies used in Bach's Vocal Works / Christ ist erstanden". Bach Cantatas Website.
- Browne, Francis (2005). ""Christ lag in Todesbanden", Text and Translation of Chorale". Bach Cantatas Website.
- Dellal, Pamela (2012). "BWV 4 – Christ lag in Todesbanden". Emmanuel Music.
- Dickey, Timothy (2015). "Cantata No. 4, "Christ lag in Todes Banden", BWV 4 (BCA 54)". Allmusic.
- Gardiner, John Eliot (2007). Johann Sebastian Bach (1685-1750) / Cantatas Nos 4, 6, 31, 66, 134 & 145 (Media notes). Soli Deo Gloria (at Hyperion Records website).
- Gardiner, John Eliot (2007). Johann Sebastian Bach (1685-1750) / Cantatas Nos 24, 71, 88, 93, 131, 177 & 185 (Media notes). Soli Deo Gloria (at Hyperion Records website).
- Oron, Aryeh (2015). "Cantata BWV 4 Christ lag in Todesbanden". Bach Cantatas Website.
- Rummel, Walter (1926). "Jesus Christus, Gottes Sohn" (PDF). Bach—Rummel Adaptations (No. 7). London: J. & W. Chester.
- Serebrier, José. "Leopold Stokowski Transcriptions". stokowski.org.
- Traupman-Carr, Carol (2002). "Cantata BWV 4, Christ lag in Todes Banden". The Bach Choir of Bethlehem.
- "Chorale from the Easter cantata Christ lag in Todesbanden". Broude Brothers. 1951.
- "Joh. Seb. Bach's Kirchencantaten; Bd. 1 / No. 1 – 10". Universitätsbibliothek Heidelberg.
- "BACH Piano Transcriptions Rachmaninov, Cortot, Christie, Bartlett, Samaroff, Copeland, Cohen, Kelberine, Gieseking, Backhaus, Janis, Rubinstein (Rare Rec.1930-47) Naxos Historical". Naxos Historical. Archived from the original on 17 June 2016.
- Timbrell, Charles (2006). "Bach: Piano Transcriptions – 6 (Walter Rummel / Jonathan Plowright (liner notes)" (PDF). Hyperion.
- "Catalog of Copyright Entries: Third series; Part 5A: Published Music". Washington, D.C.: Library of Congress. 1951. p. 10.
- "Bach – Cantata No 4 Jesus Christus, Gottes Sohn (Christ lag in Todes Banden) BWV 4 – orch. Stokowski". publicdomain.lafauniere.info. Archived from the original on 17 August 2016.
- "Bach – Chorale Prelude Christ lag in Todesbanden BWV 718 (orch. Stokowski)". publicdomain.lafauniere.info. Archived from the original on 17 August 2016.
