= Wipo =

Wipo may refer to:

- World Intellectual Property Organization, a specialized agency of the United Nations
- Wipo of Burgundy (c. 995 – c. 1050), a priest, poet and chronicler
