= Christ the Lord Is Risen Again! =

German Christian hymn

- Native name: Christus Ist erstanden
- Genre: Hymn
- Written: 1531
- Text: Michael Weiße, translated by Catherine Winkworth
- Based on: Psalm 145
- Meter: 7.7.7.7.4
- Melody: "Victimae pashali laudes", "Christ Ist Erstanden", "Wurtemburg" by Johann Rosenmüller

"Christ the Lord Is Risen Again!" (German: "Christus ist erstanden Von der Marter alle") is a German Christian hymn published by Michael Weiße in 1531 based on an earlier German hymn of a very similar name. It was translated into English in 1858 by Catherine Winkworth.

== History ==
Weisse based his new hymn text, "Christus ist erstanden Von der Marter alle", upon the earlier German Leise text from the Mass of ("Christus ist erstanden") which was studied by Martin Luther.

The hymn tune CHRIST IST ERSTANDEN was derived from a sequence used in the German Roman Catholic Latin Mass from 1100 called "Victimae paschali laudes" which was a widely popular Easter melody. It was then expanded from its initial short Sequence use in the Latin Mass, which "victimae paschali laudes" was, into the longer Liese form in German.

The tune CHRIST IST ERSTANDEN was then adopted by the Protestants as a hymn tune, and Weisse modeled new hymn text after the "Christus ist erstanden" used in the German Mass. His hymn text is titled "Christus ist erstanden Von der Marter alle" and was set to what had been adopted as the hymn tune, CHRIST IST ERSTANDEN, and thus became a hymn of the Church of Bohemia. Weisse published his German hymn text in 1531 in the German language hymnal he edited, Ein Neugesängbuchlein, in the Kingdom of Bohemia.

In 1858, Winkworth translated Weisse's German text for "Christus ist erstanden Von der Marter alle" into English, initially giving it the English title of "Song of Triumph". She published "Christ the Lord Is Risen Again" in the second edition of her Lyra Germanica in 1858, attributing the hymn to the "Bohemian Brethren".

Winkworth's approach in translating the hymn was to try to recreate the verses rather than making a direct translation of them due to German fusional language meaning that some words in the original had to be removed in translation as they did not fit into the English translation.

The hymn is often used as a hymn for Easter Sunday which commemorates the Resurrection of Jesus.

=== Music ===
The most common hymn tune Weisse's German text is set to is CHRIST IST ERSTANDEN, which originated from the Latin "Victimae pashali laudes". The U.S. Lutheran hymnal sets Winkworth's English translation to the hymn tune WÜRTEMBURG. However, this hymn text has been set to other hymn tunes, including LLANFAIR.

In 1971, John Rutter also composed his own musical setting targeted at choirs, not as a congregational hymn, set to Winkworth's English translation, "Christ the Lord Is Risen Again!"

== See also ==
- Christ ist erstanden
