= 1024 German royal election =

- 4 September 1024

Elected by the stem dukes and the nobility Consensus needed to win
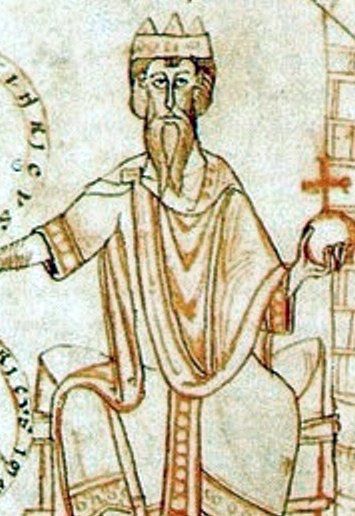
| Candidate | Conrad the Elder | Conrad the Younger |
| Dynasty | Salian | Salian |
| Result | Elected | Defeated |
King before election
Henry II
Ottonian dynasty
Elected King
Conrad II
Salian dynasty

The 1024 German royal election was an imperial election held on 4 September 1024 at Kamba to select the successor to the German throne. The election resulted in the victory of Conrad the Elder, marking the historic transition of power from the Ottonian dynasty to the Salian dynasty.

== Background ==
Emperor Henry II died childless in 1024, bringing an end to the Ottonian dynasty that had ruled the Kingdom of Germany since 919. Without a clear successor to the German throne, Henry's widow Cunigunde of Luxembourg ruled as regent while the German dukes gathered to elect a new king. Cunigunde was assisted by her brothers Bishop Dietrich I of Metz and Duke Henry V of Bavaria. Archbishop Aribo of Mainz, the primate of Germany, also assisted Cunigunde.

== Assembly at Kamba ==
On 4 September 1024, the German princes gathered at Kamba, a historical name for an area on the east banks of the Rhine opposite the modern German town of Oppenheim. Now the location of Kamba is marked with a small equestrian statue of Conrad II. The chronicler and Conrad's chaplain, Wipo of Burgundy, attended the meeting and documented the event.

Archbishop Aribo presided over the assembly. Conrad presented himself as a candidate for election, as did his younger cousin Conrad. Both were descendants of Emperor Otto I by their common grandfather Otto of Worms, son of Liutgarde, one of Otto's daughters. Although further members of the Ottonian dynasty existed, none were seriously considered eligible.

The Duchy of Saxony adopted a neutral strategy while the Duchy of Lorraine favoured the younger Conrad. A majority of the assembled princes favoured the elder Conrad, as the father of a seven-year-old son implied a more stable dynastic future for the kingdom. As president of the assembly, Archbishop Aribo cast the first vote and supported the elder Conrad. He was joined by the other clerics in support of him. The secular dukes then cast their votes for the elder Conrad as well. Archbishop Pilgrim of Cologne, Duke Gothelo I of Lower Lorraine and Duke Frederick II of Upper Lorraine did not support him.

== Coronation and aftermath ==
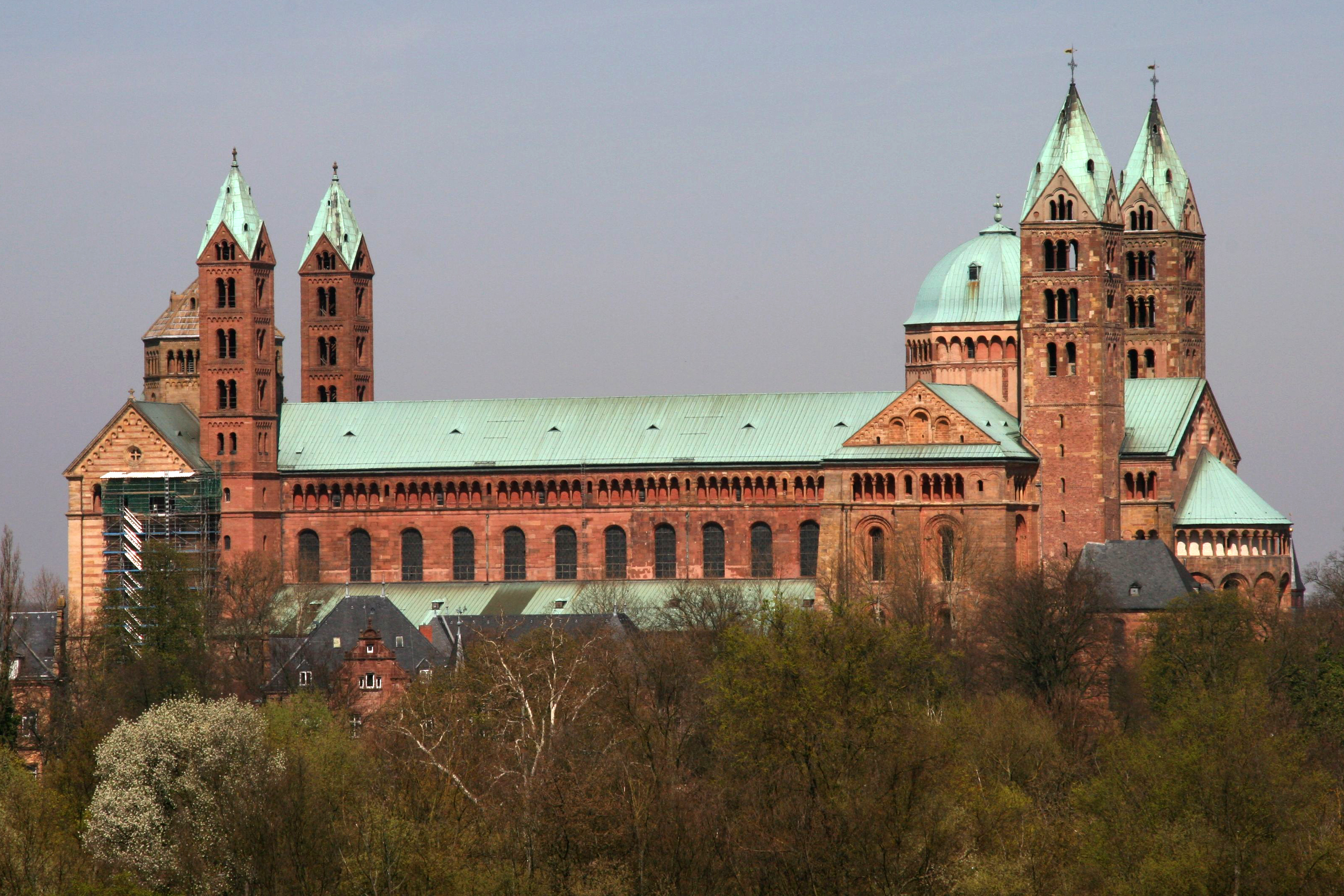
Speyer Cathedral, consecrated in 1061

Conrad was crowned king of Germany by Archbishop Aribo in Mainz Cathedral on 8 September 1024 at the age of 34. To mark his election, Conrad commissioned the construction of Speyer Cathedral, near his ancestral home of Worms. Construction began in 1030. Archbishop Aribo, as archbishop of Mainz, was already the chancellor of Germany. Conrad wanted to reward the archbishop for his electoral support, so he made Aribo chancellor of Italy as well, making Aribo the second most powerful man in the Holy Roman Empire as the imperial chancellor.

Aribo refused to crown Conrad's wife Gisela as queen as their marriage violated canon law. Conrad refused to accept Archbishop Aribo's position. Archbishop Pilgrim of Cologne saw the situation as an opportunity to restore his relationship with the king, after refusing to support Conrad's election, and he crowned Gisela queen on 21 September 1024. The political reorientation of Pilgrim also weakened the opposition towards the new king.

== See also ==
- Imperial election
- Conrad II, Holy Roman Emperor
- Salian dynasty

== Bibliography ==
- Bernhardt, John W. (2002). Itinerant Kingship & Monasteries in Early Medieval Germany, c. 936–1075. Cambridge University Press.
- Heer, Friedrich (1968). The Holy Roman Empire. Translated by Sondheimer, Janet. Frederick A. Praeger.
- Schutz, Herbert (2010). The Medieval Empire in Central Europe: Dynastic Continuity in the Post-Carolingian Frankish Realm, 900–1300. Cambridge Scholars Publishing. ISBN 978-1-4438-2035-6.
- Weinfurter, Stefan (1999). The Salian Century: Main Currents in an Age of Transition. University of Pennsylvania Press. ISBN 0-8122-3508-8.
- Wolfram, Herwig (2006). Conrad II, 990–1039: Emperor of Three Kingdoms. The Pennsylvania State University Press. ISBN 0-271-02738-X.
