= Christ lag in Todesbanden =

Easter hymn by Martin Luther

"Christ lag in Todes Banden"
- Hymn by Martin Luther
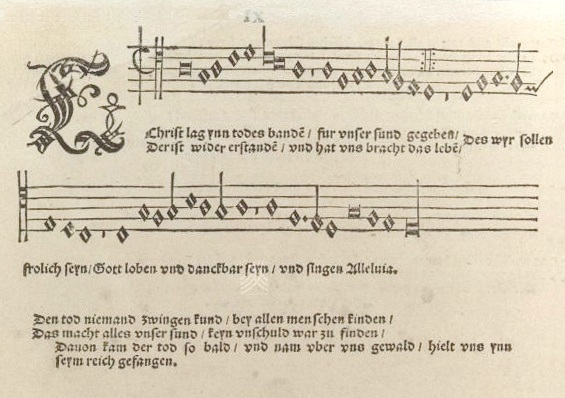
- "Christ lag ynn todes bande" in Eyn geystlich Gesangk Buchleyn of 1524
- English: Christ lay in death's bonds
- Catalogue: Zahn 7012
- Occasion: Easter
- Language: German
- Melody: by Luther and Johann Walter
- Published: 1524

"Christ lag in Todesbanden" (also "... in Todes Banden"; "Christ lay in death's bonds") is an Easter hymn by Martin Luther. Its melody is by Luther and Johann Walter. Both the text and the melody were based on earlier examples. It was published in 1524 in the Erfurt Enchiridion and in Walter's choral hymnal Eyn geystlich Gesangk Buchleyn. Various composers, including Pachelbel, Bach and Telemann, have used the hymn in their compositions.

== Text and melody ==
In early editions the hymn, in seven stanzas, was indicated as an improved (German: gebessert) version of "Christ ist erstanden". The hymn is in bar form. The Stollen, that is the repeated first part of the melody, sets two lines of text for each repetition, with the remaining four lines of each stanza set to the remainder of the melody.

=== Text ===
The hymn celebrates the Resurrection of Jesus, with particular reference to a struggle between Life and Death. The third verse quotes from 1 Corinthians 15, saying that Christ's Atonement for sin has removed the "sting" of Death. The fifth verse compares the sacrifice with that celebrated by Jews in the Pascal Lamb at Passover. The sacrificial "blood" ("Its blood marks our doors") refers to the marking of the doors before the exodus from Egypt. The final stanza recalls the tradition of baking and eating Easter Bread, with the "old leaven" alluding again to the exodus, in contrast to the "Word of Grace", concluding "Christ would ... alone nourish the soul."

1
Christ lag in Todesbanden,
für unsre Sünd gegeben,
der ist wieder erstanden
und hat uns bracht das Leben.
Des wir sollen fröhlich sein,
Gott loben und dankbar sein
und singen Halleluja.
Halleluja.

2
Den Tod niemand zwingen konnt
bei allen Menschenkindern;
das macht alles unsre Sünd,
kein Unschuld war zu finden.
Davon kam der Tod so bald
und nahm über uns Gewalt,
hielt uns in seim Reich gefangen.
Halleluja.

3
Jesus Christus, Gottes Sohn,
an unser Statt ist kommen
und hat die Sünde abgetan,
damit dem Tod genommen
all sein Recht und sein Gewalt;
da bleibt nichts denn Tods Gestalt,
den Stachel hat er verloren.
Halleluja.

4
Es war ein wunderlich Krieg,
da Tod und Leben 'rungen;
das Leben, behielt den Sieg,
es hat den Tod verschlungen.
Die Schrift hat verkündet das,
wie ein Tod den andern fraß,
ein Spott aus dem Tod ist worden.
Halleluja.

5
Hier ist das rechte Osterlamm,
davon wir sollen leben,
das ist an des Kreuzes Stamm
in heißer Lieb gegeben.
Des Blut zeichnet unsere Tür,
das hält der Glaub dem Tode für,
der Würger kann uns nicht rühren.
Halleluja.

6
So feiern wir das hoh Fest
mit Herzensfreud und Wonne,
das uns der Herre scheinen lässt.
Er ist selber die Sonne,
der durch seiner Gnaden Glanz
erleucht' unsre Herzen ganz;
der Sünden Nacht ist vergangen.
Halleluja.

7
Wir essen und leben wohl,
zum süßen Brot geladen;
der alte Sau'rteig nicht soll
sein bei dem Wort der Gnaden.
Christus will die Kost uns sein
und speisen die Seel allein;
der Glaub will keins andern leben.
Halleluja.

Christ lay in Death's dark prison,
It was our sin that bound Him;
This day hath He arisen,
And sheds new life around Him.
Therefore let us joyful be
And praise our God right heartily.
So sing we Hallelujah!
Hallelujah!

O'er Death no man could prevail,
If mortal e'er came near him;
Through guilt all our strength would fail,
Our sinful hearts did fear him.
Therefore Death did gain the day,
And led in triumph us away,
Henceforth to dwell imprisoned.
Hallelujah!

Now Jesus Christ, the Son of God,
For our defence hath risen.
Our grievous guilt He hath removed,
And Death hath bound in prison.
All his might Death must forego.
For now he's nought but idle show,
His sting is lost for ever.
Hallelujah!

How fierce and dreadful was the strife
When Life with Death contended;
For Death was swallowed up by Life
And all his power was ended.
God of old, the Scriptures show,
Did promise that it should be so.
O Death, where's now thy victory?
Hallelujah!

The Paschal Victim here we see,
Whereof God's Word hath spoken;
He hangs upon the cruel tree.
Of saving love the token.
His blood ransoms us from sin,
And Death no more can enter in.
Now Satan cannot harm us.
Hallelujah!

So keep we all this holy feast.
Where every joy invites us;
Our Sun is rising in the East,
It is our Lord Who lights us.
Through the glory of His grace
Our darkness will to-day give place.
The night of sin is over.
Hallelujah!

With grateful hearts we all are met
To eat the bread of gladness.
The ancient leaven now forget,
And every thought of sadness.
Christ Himself the feast hath spread,
By Him the hungry soul is fed,
And He alone can feed us.
Hallelujah!

=== Melody ===
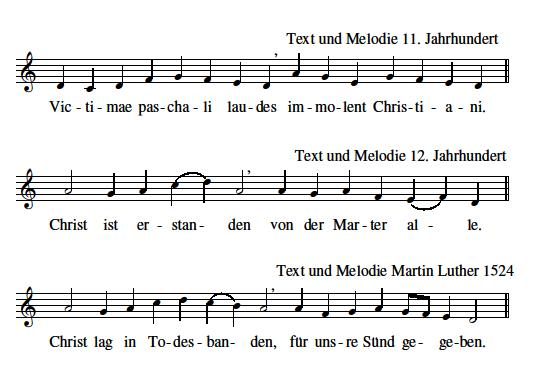
Comparison of Victimae paschali laudes, "Christ ist erstanden" and "Christ lag in Todesbanden"

The melody as set by Luther (with help from Walter) seems to have strong correlations with parts of the Eucharistic sequence for Easter, Victimae paschali laudes, believed to have been written by Wipo of Burgundy in the 11th century. This was transformed, gradually into a "Leise", a devotional German pre-Reformation song with a number of stanzas, but maintaining strong characteristics of plainsong.

Johann Walter published "Christ lag in Todes Banden" with two variants of the hymn tune in 1524: Zahn No. 7012a, the tenth tune in the choral hymnal Eyn geystlich Gesangk Buchleyn, is a setting of the hymn with stanzas of eight lines, the last line of each stanza consisting of the word "Halleluja". The other version, Zahn No. 7012b, appearing under the title "Der Lobsanck Christ ist erstanden / Gebessert" in the Erfurt Enchiridion and as ninth item in Eyn geystlich Gesangk Buchleyn, is a setting of the hymn in seven-line stanzas, that is without the repeated "Halleluja" at the end of every stanza.

Notwithstanding the fact that the version with eight-line stanzas had a rhythmically imperfect form (German: "rhythmische Gestaltung ist unvolkommen", according to Johannes Zahn), and that Walter only included the version with seven-line stanzas in his later publications, the former version was picked up in the hymnals of Klug (1535, 1543), Schumann (1539) and Babst (1545), and, with some rhythmical adaptations, henceforth became the standard for publications of the tune. Minor alterations of the tune, that is, without modifying its melodic shape, included the addition of passing notes and modification of rhythmic patterns to conform the chorale to emerging styles, and to fit the chorale into a regular time signature. For instance, in the first half of the 18th century, Johann Sebastian Bach based all his settings of the "Christ lag in Todes Banden" hymn (BWV 4, 158/4, 277, 278, 279, 625, 695, 695a and 718) on the eight-line variant of the hymn tune. The following four-part setting, with the last stanza of the hymn as text, is taken from his Christ lag in Todes Banden chorale cantata:

== Editions ==
In 1524 "Christ lag in Todesbanden" was published in the Erfurt Enchiridion and in Walter's choral hymnal Eyn geystlich Gesangk Buchleyn. The 1524 Erfurt Enchiridion presented the melody and text of Luther's hymn on two pages:

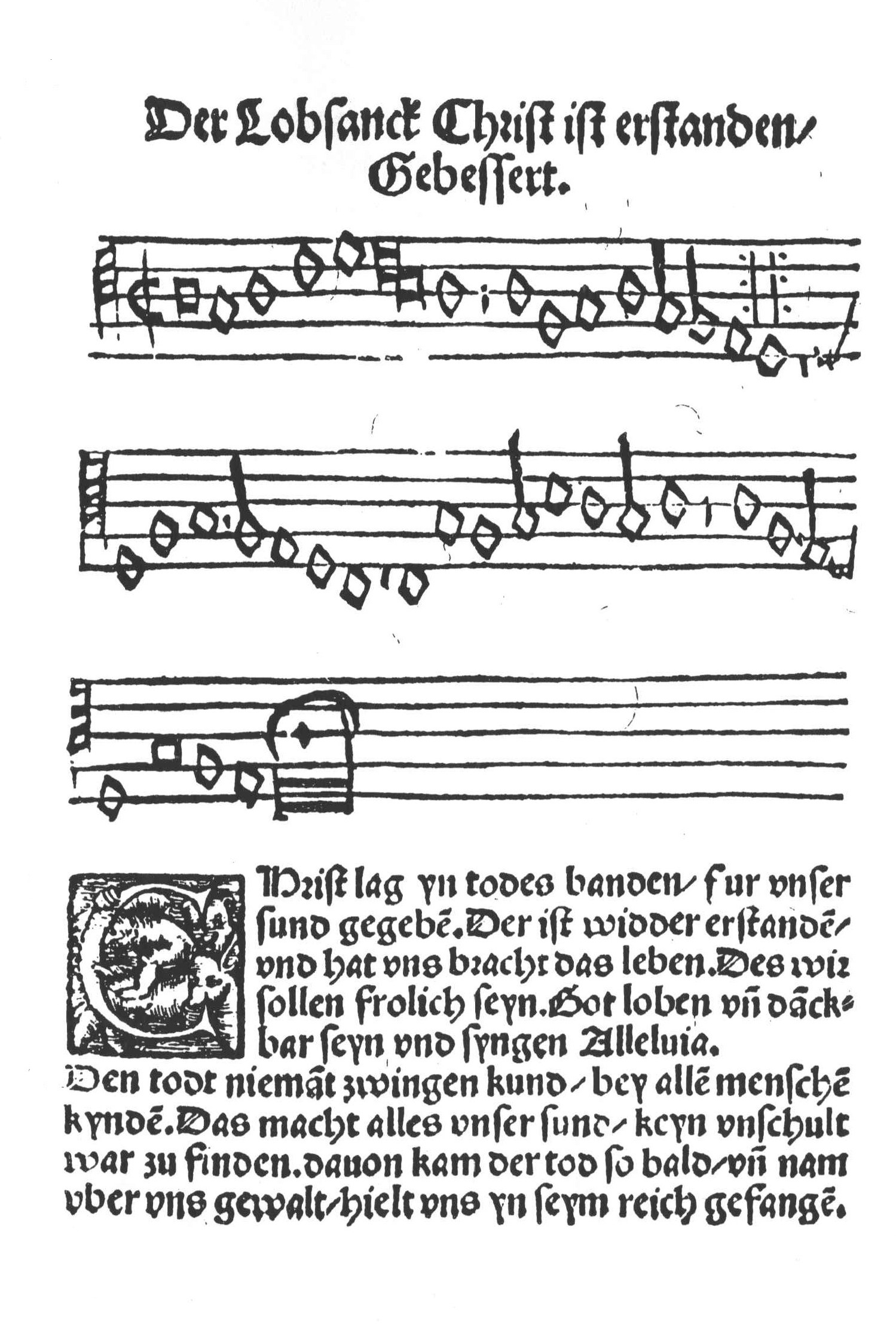
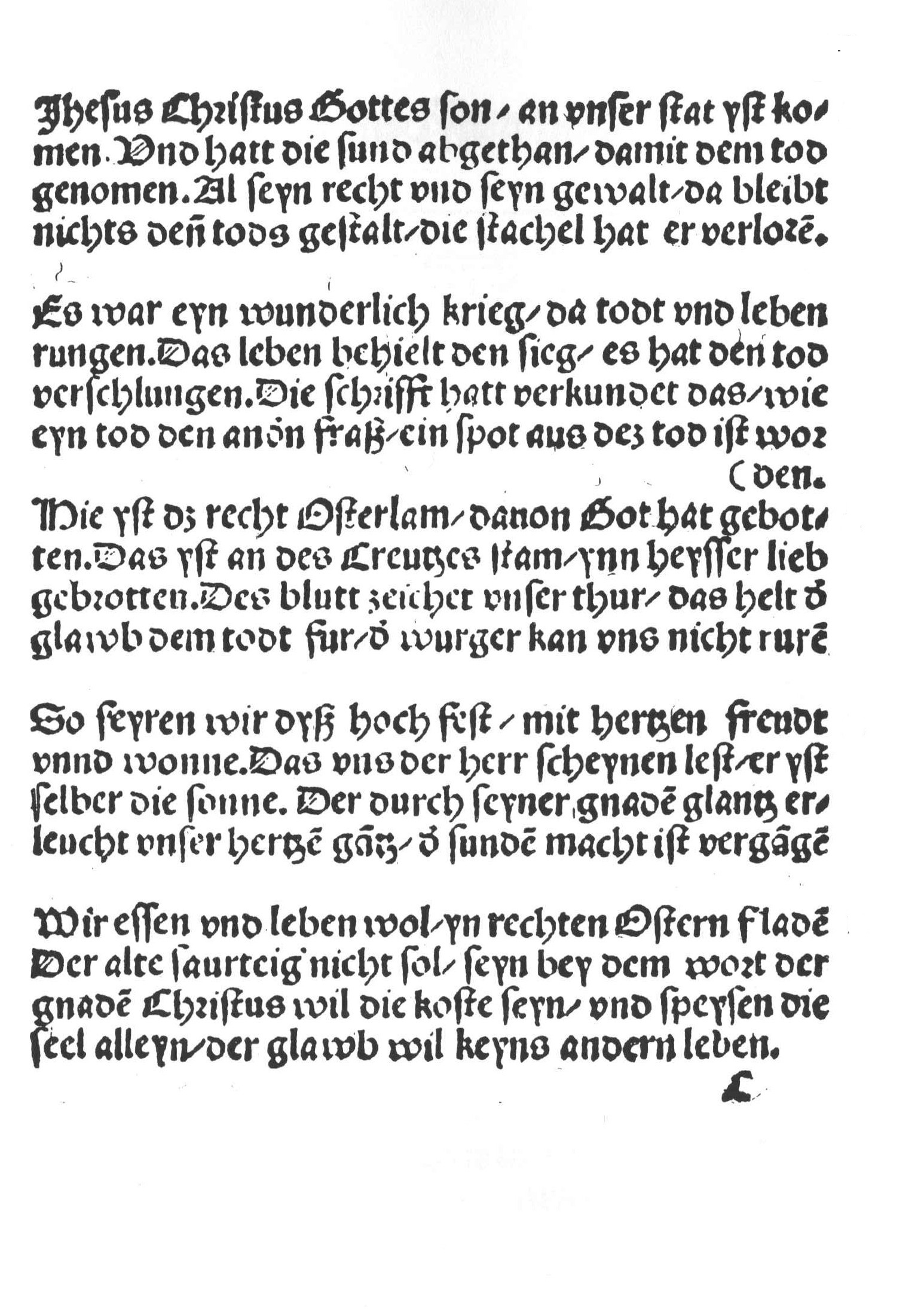

In 1545 the hymn appeared as No. 8 in the Babstsche Gesangbuch. In the German-language Protestant hymnal Evangelisches Gesangbuch (EG) it appears in modernised language as EG 101. It also appears in various translations in English hymnals, the most common one being "Christ Jesus Lay in Death's Strong Bands" by Richard Massie.

== Use in other compositions ==
Christ lag in Todesbanden, TWV 31:27
A chorale prelude upon the hymn, by Baroque composer Georg Philipp Telemann.

As one of the principal Lutheran hymns for Easter, "Christ lag in Todesbanden" appears in several vocal and organ compositions of the Baroque Era, for example by

- Nicholas Bruhns
- Georg Böhm
- Samuel Scheidt
- Heinrich Scheidemann
- Johann Pachelbel:
  - Chorale prelude Christ lag in Todesbanden, P 58 (=BWV Anh. 171).
  - Christ lag in Todesbanden, P 60, sacred concerto in seven movements for SATB, strings, bassoon and continuo.
- Johann Kuhnau
- Christoph Graupner, GWV 1128/34 and 1130/21
- Georg Philipp Telemann:
  - Missa brevis super 'Christ lag in Todesbanden', TWV 9:3
  - Chorale preludes from Fugierende und verändernde Choräle, TWV 31:1–48: Christ lag in Todes Banden, TWV 31:27, and TWV 31:28 (bicinium).
- Johann Sebastian Bach:
  - Christ lag in Todes Banden, BWV 4, an early chorale cantata for Easter, opens with a sinfonia, followed by seven movements, using each of the original seven verses by Luther, and with the melody as a cantus firmus.
  - The cantata Der Friede sei mit dir, BWV 158, uses the fifth verse of Martin Luther's chorale in a four-part chorale in the fourth and final movement.
  - "Christ lag in Todesbanden", BWV 277, 278 and 279 are included in Bach's four-part chorale settings.
  - Christ lag in Todesbanden, BWV 625, is a chorale prelude from the Orgelbüchlein of only 16 bars in length (excluding repeats). The soprano voice follows the hymn virtually unchanged, with the lower parts descending relentlessly in quaver and semiquaver figures.
  - Fantasia super Christ lag in Todes Banden, BWV 695, is a chorale prelude from the Kirnberger chorale preludes (BWV 690–713), consisting of a two-part fughetta above the chorale melody in the bass
  - Christ lag in Todes Banden, BWV 718, is a chorale prelude, which uses the chorale tune as a cantus firmus through a range of textures, alternating between triplet and semiquaver movement and displaying the Northern influences of organ fantasias by Böhm, Buxtehude and Reincken.

== Sources ==
- Braatz, Thomas; Oron, Aryeh (2011). "Chorale Melodies used in Bach's Vocal Works / Christ ist erstanden". Bach Cantatas Website.
- Dahn, Luke (2018). "BWV 4.8". www.bach-chorales.com.
- Dürr, Alfred; Kobayashi, Yoshitake, eds. (1998). Bach-Werke-Verzeichnis: Kleine Ausgabe – Nach der von Wolfgang Schmieder vorgelegten 2. Ausgabe [Bach Works Catalogue: Small Edition – After Wolfgang Schmieder's 2nd edition] (in German). Kirsten Beißwenger (collaborator). (BWV^{2a} ed.). Wiesbaden: Breitkopf & Härtel. ISBN 9783765102493. Preface in English and German.
- Marti, Andreas (2005). Gerhard Hahn; Jürgen Henkys (eds.). "101 – Christ lag in Todesbanden". Liederkunde zum Evangelischen Gesangbuch (in German) (12). Göttingen: Vandenhoeck & Ruprecht: 56–62. ISBN 3-525-50335-0.
- Renwick, William (1995), Analyzing Fugue: A Schenkerian Approach, Pendragon Press, pp. 4–6, ISBN 0945193521
- Terry, Charles Sanford (1921), Bach's Chorals, vol. III, Cambridge, The University Press
- Williams, Peter (2003), The Organ Music of J. S. Bach (2nd ed.), Cambridge University Press, ISBN 0-521-89115-9
- Zahn, Johannes (1891). Die Melodien der deutschen evangelischen Kirchenlieder (in German). Vol. IV. Gütersloh: Bertelsmann.
