= Apel Codex =

German manuscript

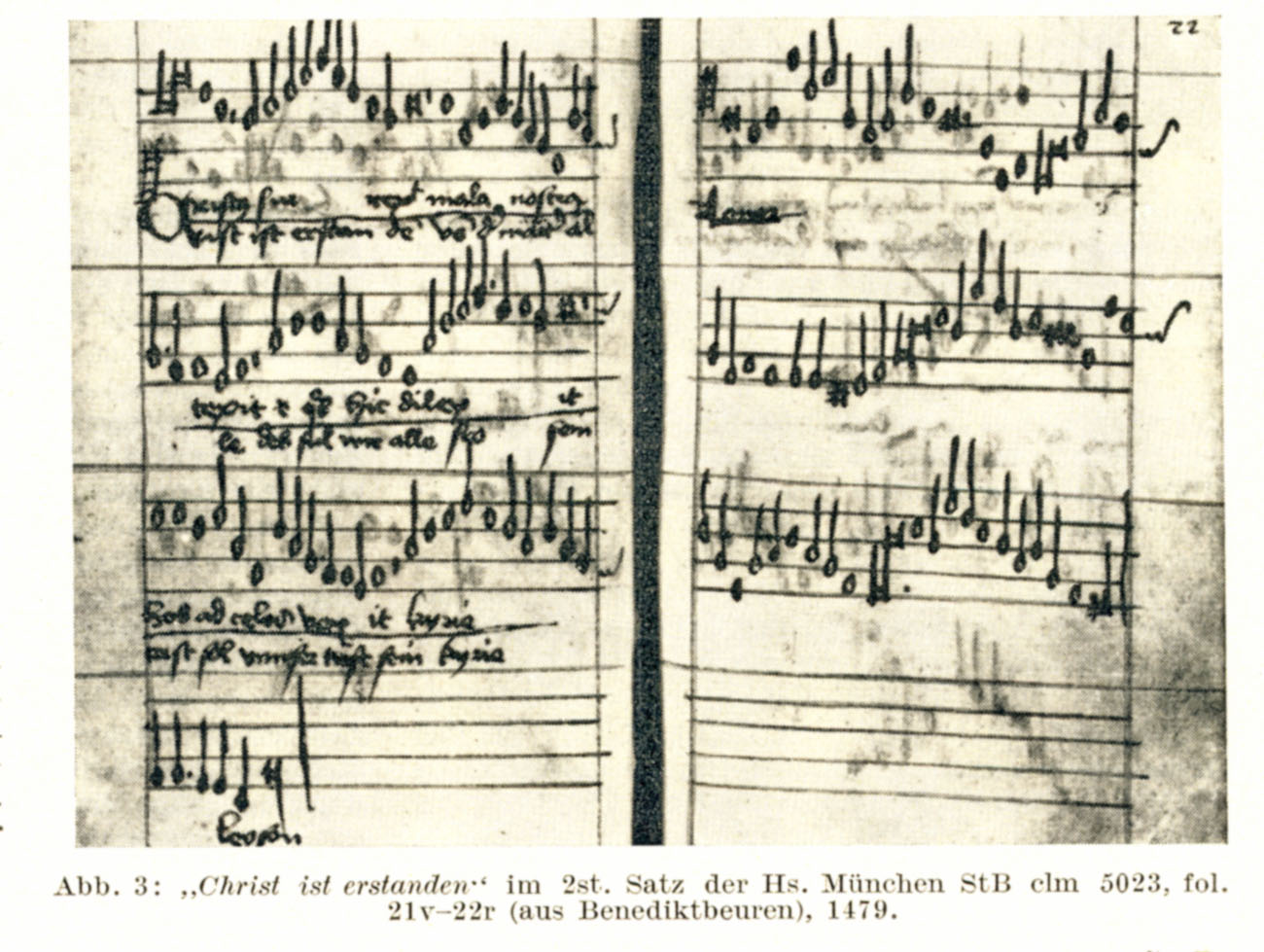
"Christ ist erstanden" manuscript

The Apel Codex is a German manuscript which dates from about the year 1500, providing an important source for 15th and 16th century polyphonic music. The works in the manuscript were collected by Nikolaus Apel from about 1490 to 1504. They consist of 172 pieces in 260 folios, mainly liturgical music by German and northern European composers, including examples of the low contra-tenor scoring which became a specialty of German music of the period.

The manuscript is currently housed in the Leipzig University library, and contains works including "Nich uns, o Herr" and "Christ ist erstanden".
