= Christus ist erstanden! O tönt =

Catholic hymn for Easter

- German Catholic Easter hymn
- English: Christ is risen! O sound
- Text: by Johann Weinzierl
- Language: German
- Based on: Victimae paschali laudes
- Melody: by Paul Schniebel
- Published: 1826

"Christus ist erstanden! O tönt" (Christ is risen! O sound) is a Catholic hymn for Easter. It was written as a paraphrase of the Easter sequence Victimae paschali laudes, and appeared in 1816 by Johann Weinzierl. A melody was composed by Paul Schniebel in 1826. The first of six stanzas begins: Christus ist erstanden! O tönt, ihr Jubellieder, tönt!. The hymn is similar to Schubert's Deutsche Messe in its idea to provide singable hymns in German for the congregational.

The hymn has appeared in regional sections of the Catholic hymnals, both the 1975 Gotteslob and the 2013 Gotteslob. It is a frequently sung hymn in Easter services.
