= Johann Walter =

Lutheran composer and poet

Johann Walter, also known as Johann Walther or Johannes Walter (original name: Johann Blankenmüller; 1496 – 25 March 1570), was a Lutheran composer and poet during the Reformation period.

== Life ==
Walter was born in Kahla, in present-day Thuringia, in 1496. According to a document filed with his will, he was born with the surname of Blanckenmüller, but adopted out of poverty by a citizen of Kahla, and given an education at Kahla and Rochlitz under his new name: Johann Walter.

He began his career as a composer and bass cantor in the chapel of Frederick the Wise at the age of 21. It was a position he would hold until Frederick's death in 1525. By this time, he was the director of the chapel and had become an outspoken musical spokesman for Lutherans. Walter edited the first Protestant hymnal for choir, Eyn geystlich Gesangk Buchleyn, in Wittenberg in 1524, with a foreword by Martin Luther himself; and for the German-language Deutsche Messe produced in 1527.

Following the conclusion of his appointment to Frederick's chapel, Walter became cantor for the Torgau town choir in 1525, a post he would hold until 1548, when he was named court composer for Moritz, Duke of Saxony in Dresden, on whose orders he founded the orchestra that would develop into today's Staatskapelle Dresden.

Walter did not remain in Dresden very long, and by 1554 he had accepted a pension from the duke and returned to Torgau, where he remained for the rest of his life. He died on 25 March 1570.

== St Matthew Passion ==
While in Dresden, Walter composed a responsorial Passion in German. In earlier musical versions of the Passion story the entire narrative was a succession of polyphonic motets, but Walter used a monophonic reciting tone for the Evangelist and dramatis personae, reserving for the people and disciples simple falsobordone (chordal) polyphony.

Finnish ensemble Kuninkaantien muusikot (Musicians of the King's Road) has performed the Passion as a part of its early passions cycle. The performance took place in Turku Cathedral in 2017, the year of the 500th anniversary of the Reformation.

== Musical works ==
Walter wrote his motets and lieder, often of high quality, in two distinct styles. For the first style he employed a polyphonic manner derived from the Franco-Flemish school, in particular showing the influence of Josquin des Prez and Heinrich Isaac. In the tenor voice of these compositions was a cantus firmus sounding as an unbroken succession of sustained notes or as a melody fragmented into short sections separated by rests. Above and below the cantus firmus were counterpoints that sometimes imitated the tenor but more often moved independently of it. In either case the melodic flow of four or more voices avoided simultaneous rests.

For the second style Walter rejected imitative or independent voice-leading for chorale writing in which each fragment of the cantus firmus rested simultaneously with the other parts. In a few such cases he placed the borrowed tune in the top voice, thereby inaugurating the favorite manner of chorale setting of the succeeding two centuries.

Some of his more famous chorale settings include:

- Allein auf Gottes Wort
- Christ ist erstanden
- Christ lag in Todesbanden
- Christum wir sollen loben schon
- Ein feste Burg ist unser Gott
- Erhalt uns, Herr, bei deinem Wort
- Gelobet seist du, Jesu Christ
- Joseph, lieber Joseph mein (Resonet in laudibus)
- Komm, Gott Schöpfer, Heiliger Geist
- Komm, Heiliger Geist, Herre Gott
- Laus Matrimonii ex Horatio (Felices ter)
- Nun bitten wir den Heiligen Geist
- Vater unser im Himmelreich
- Verbum caro factum est
- Wir glauben all an einen Gott
- Wo Gott der Herr nicht bei uns hält

== Miscellaneous ==
The asteroid 120481 Johannwalter is named in his honour. He is also commemorated in the Calendar of Saints of the Lutheran Church–Missouri Synod as a musician on April 24.
