= Christ ist erstanden (Schütz) =

Choral work by Heinrich Schütz

- by Heinrich Schütz
- Catalogue: SWV 470
- Genre: Sacred vocal music
- Text: Christ ist erstanden
- Language: German
- Vocal: Favoritchor SAT; 2 Capellchor SATB
- Instrumental: 4 trombones; 4 viols; continuo

Christ ist erstanden (Christ is risen), SWV 470, is a sacred choral work by Heinrich Schütz, a setting of the German Easter hymn "Christ ist erstanden". It is scored for a three-part Favoritchor SAT, two Capellchor SATB, a choir of four trombones (Coro di tromboni), a choir of four viols (Coro di viole) and basso continuo.

Christ ist erstanden is part of the complete edition of the composer's works by Carus-Verlag, begun in 1992 as the Stuttgart Schütz Edition and planned to be completed by 2017. The edition uses the Heinrich-Schütz-Archiv of the Hochschule für Musik Dresden.
