= Chorale concerto =

Short sacred composition from the German Baroque era

In music, a chorale concerto is a short sacred composition for one or more voices and instruments, principally from the very early German Baroque era. Most examples of the genre were composed between 1600 and 1650.

== Description ==
This use of the word concerto differs considerably from the more modern, and considerably more common usage: in the early Baroque the word meant vocal music accompanied by instruments, specifically in stile concertato (lit. 'concerted style'). The stile concertato was brought north across the Alps by composers such as Hans Leo Hassler and Heinrich Schütz, who studied in Venice with the originators of the style, the Venetian School composers including Giovanni Gabrieli. Hassler, Schütz and others then applied their newly learned techniques to the German chorale to create a form roughly equivalent in expression and purpose to the motet which in the preceding Renaissance era was used in Roman Catholic context. The Protestant Reformation made necessary the development of new genres of music, most of which were related in form and function to equivalent genres in Roman Catholic parts of Europe, but which avoided the use of Gregorian Chant, using the chorale instead (many chorale tunes of which were derived directly from chant, but fitted with words in German). A chorale concerto is a sacred concerto based on a Lutheran chorale.

There were two basic types of chorale concerto:

1. A simple composition for voice and basso continuo, sometimes with an obbligato solo instrument;
2. A more elaborate polychoral setting, directly related to the music of the Venetian School, and often modeled after the work of Giovanni Gabrieli.

The chorale cantata, culminating in the works of J.S. Bach, evolved out of the chorale concerto, and became a popular liturgical form in Germany for more than a hundred years.

== Composers ==
Composers of chorale concertos included:

- Samuel Scheidt
- Johann Hermann Schein
- Michael Praetorius

== Sources ==
- Marshall, Robert L. (1980). "Chorale concerto". In Sadie, Stanley (ed.). The New Grove Dictionary of Music and Musicians. Vol. iv (1st ed.). London: Macmillan. pp. 321–322.
- Marshall, Robert L. (1980). "Chorale settings". In Sadie, Stanley (ed.). The New Grove Dictionary of Music and Musicians. Vol. iv (1st ed.). London: Macmillan. pp. 323–338.
- Manfred Bukofzer, Music in the Baroque Era. New York, W.W. Norton & Co., 1947. ISBN 0-393-09745-5
