= Christ ist erstanden =

German Easter hymn

- German Easter hymn
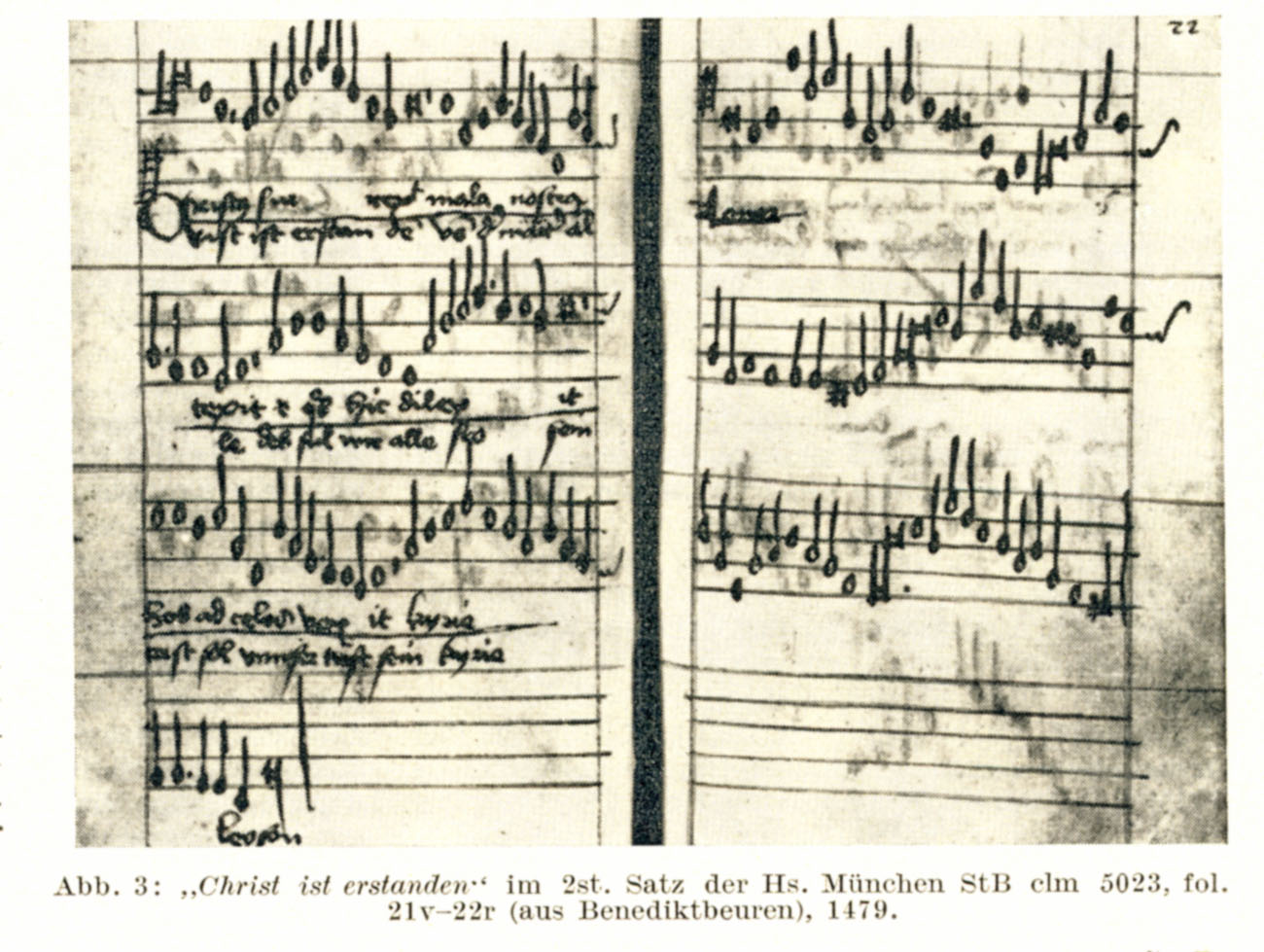
- Apel Codex, manuscript from c. 1500
- English: Christ is risen
- Catalogue: Zahn 8584
- Language: German
- Published: c. 1160
- Tune EG 99

"Christ ist erstanden" (Christ is risen) is a German Easter hymn, and is possibly the oldest Christian liturgical German song. It has inspired the music of numerous composers, such as Ludwig Senfl and Heinrich Schütz (from the sixteenth and seventeenth centuries respectively), as well as modern composers such as Oskar Gottlieb Blarr and Enjott Schneider, and has appeared in 45 hymnals, including the current German Catholic and Protestant hymnals. Translations and paraphrases include a version by Catherine Winkworth which has appeared in 231 hymnals. "Christ ist erstanden" also inspired Martin Luther to write "Christ lag in Todes Banden", deriving the melody from it.

== History ==
"Christ ist erstanden" is possibly the oldest liturgical song in German. The first stanza was sung around 1100 to venerate the cross. It is mentioned in 1160 in an order of liturgy of the diocese of Salzburg, which is kept as the Codex MII6 at the library of the University of Salzburg; it is a Leise (a form of medieval church song), each verse ending with the word "Kyrieleis" (from the Greek "kyrie eleison", for "Lord have mercy").

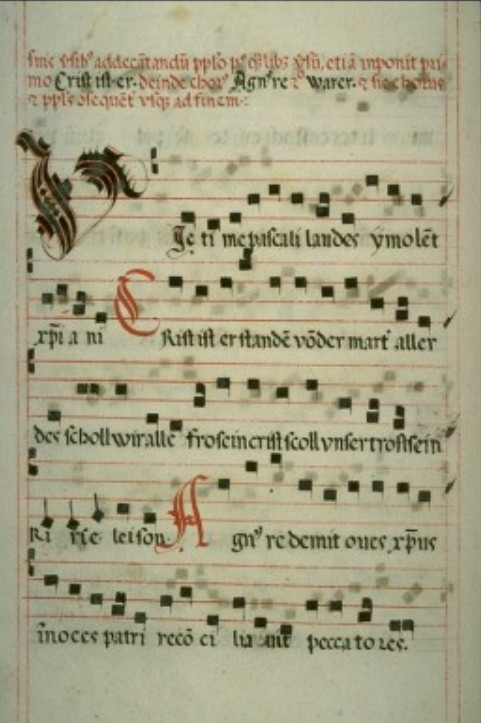
"Christ ist erstanden" within "Victimae paschali laudes"

The hymn tune, Zahn No. 8584, is derived from "Victimae paschali laudes", a sequence for Easter, by Wipo of Burgundy. The melody appeared in the Apel Codex, a manuscript from around 1500. From the 14th century, "Victimae paschali laudes" and "Christ ist erstanden" were sung alternatively. From the 15th century, different versions with several stanzas were in print. Martin Luther codified a version in three stanzas in 1529 and 1533 in Klug's hymnal, in which Luther changed the line "So freut sich alles, was da ist" (So everything living is glad), frequently used in older versions, to "So lobn wir den Vater Jesu Christ (So we praise the father of Jesus Christ), with an emphasis on Christology instead of universality. He also wrote his own paraphrase of "Victimae paschali laudes", "Christ lag in Todesbanden", published in 1524. Since then, it has been printed in German-language Protestant hymnals up to Evangelisches Gesangbuch (EG 99). It is also part of the current German-language Catholic hymnal Gotteslob (GL 318, 213 in the 1975 version), without Luther's alteration. The hymn has appeared in 45 hymnals.

=== Use by the Teutonic Order ===
According to historian William Urban, Ulrich von Jungingen's Teutonic Order troops sang "Christ ist erstanden", which he describes as "their anthem", before the Battle of Grunwald began.

=== At the siege of Kaunas ===
Wigand of Marburg's Chronica nova Prutenica (New Prussian Chronicle) reports that the Teutonic Order army sang "Christ ist erstanden" after overcoming the pagan Lithuanian defenders inside the walls of Kaunas Castle at the end of the siege of Kaunas:

... Christians began to joyously sing in lingua vulgaris the glorious chant Christ ist erstanden whose ending can be translated as: 'all of us want to rejoice, all the pagans have been punished, kirieleison' (in Latin: unde christiani ceperunt letanter cantare hoc laudabile carmen in vulgaris: 'Cristus surrexit', concludentes in vulgari: 'nos omnes volumus letari, pagani sunt in omni pena, kirieleison).

Theodor Hirsch, in the edition of Chronica nova Prutenica he published in Scriptores Rerum Prussicarum hypothesizes in a footnote about the original Middle High German lyric, which did not survive: "Wigands Verse lauteten wohl: wir alle wellen vrôlich sin – di heiden sint in allem pin." ("Wigand's verse probably read: [...].")

Johannes Voigt's earlier Geschichte Preußens von den ältesten Zeiten bis zum Untergange der Herrschaft des Deutschen Ordens translates Wigand's Latin lyric into modern German as "Wir wollen alle fröhlich seyn, die Heiden sind in aller Pein". Drawing on Wigand, Voigt writes that while the ruins of the castle were still burning brightly, the Christian army, full of the joy of victory, began to sing the song of praise "Christ ist erstanden".

== Derived hymns ==
Michael Weisse, a minister of the Bohemian Brethren, wrote a hymn "Christ ist erstanden" in seven stanzas, using the same melody. Catherine Winkworth translated that hymn to "Christ the Lord Is Risen Again!", published in 1858, which has appeared in 231 hymnals.

== Text ==
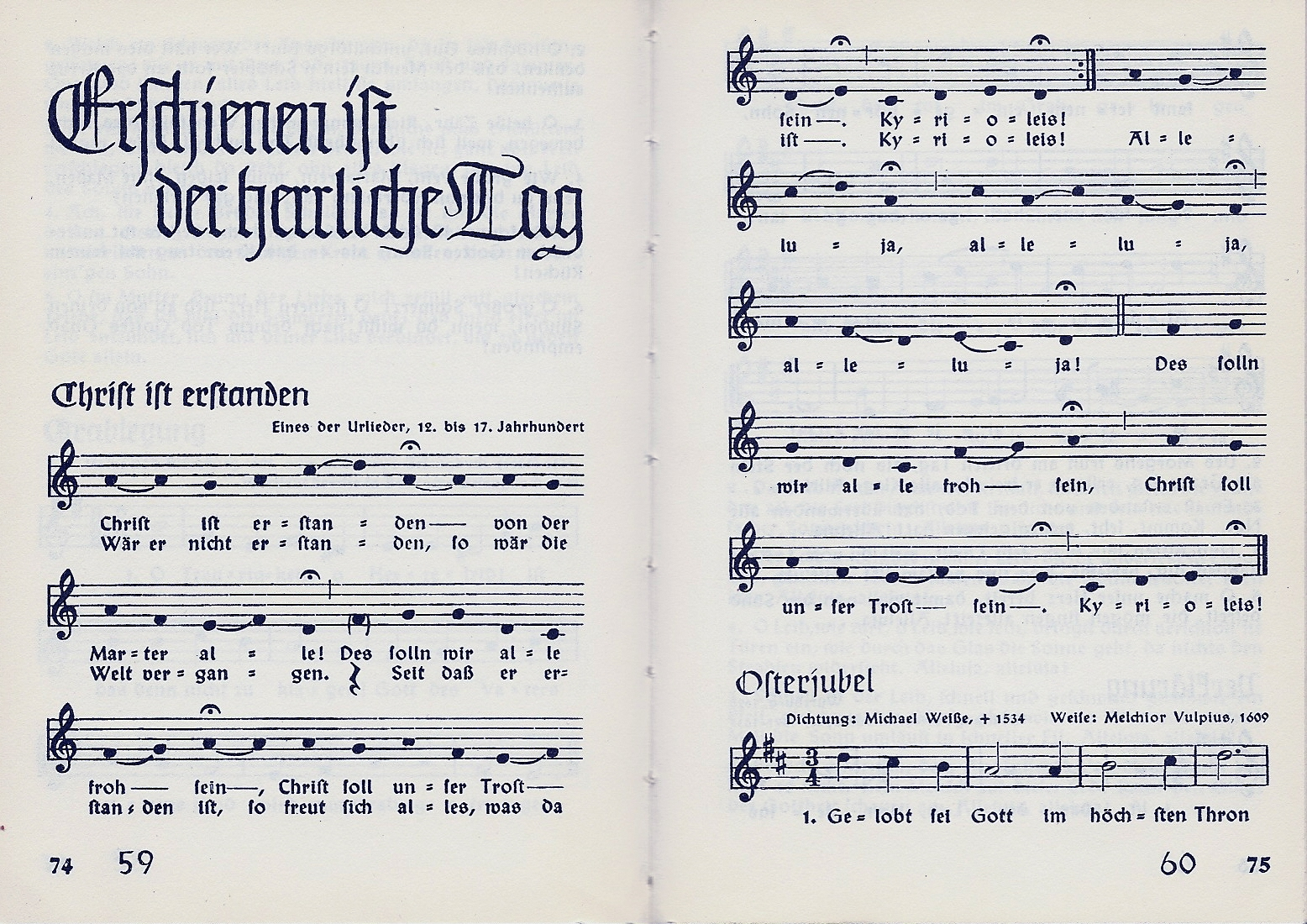
"Christ ist erstanden" as the first song for Easter, No. 59, in Kirchenlied (1938), edited by Alfred Riedel

Christ ist erstanden
von der Marter alle!
Des solln wir alle froh sein,
Christ soll unser Trost sein.
Kyrioleis.

Wär er nicht erstanden,
so wär die Welt vergangen.
Seit daß er erstanden ist,
so freut sich alles, was da ist. (Note: Text as in Gotteslob (GL 318), while the Evangelisches Gesangbuch (EG 99) has "so lobn wir den Vater Jesu Christ")
Kyrioleis.

Alleluja,
alleluja,
alleluja!
Des solln wir alle froh sein,
Christ soll unser Trost sein.
Kyrioleis.

== Musical settings ==
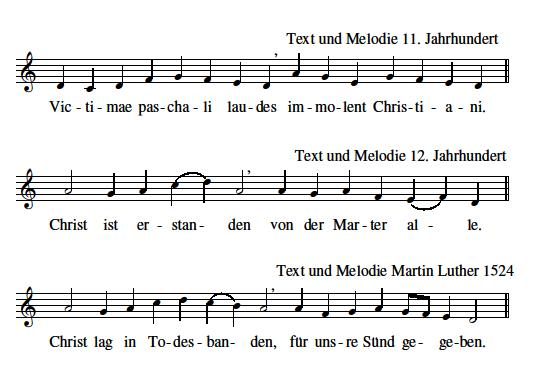
Comparison of the melodies of Victimae Paschali Laudes, "Christ ist erstanden" and "Christ lag in Todesbanden"

Ludwig Senfl composed a setting for six voices in the 15th century. Heinrich Schütz wrote Christ ist erstanden, a setting for three vocal choirs, a choir of trombones and a choir of viols. Bach used the final stanza of the hymn to conclude his Easter cantata Erfreut euch, ihr Herzen, BWV 66. He also employed the hymn for the chorale prelude BWV 627 of his Orgelbüchlein.

Max Reger set the hymn in 1900 for seven-part choir (SSAATTB) a cappella and included it as No. 8 in his Zwölf deutsche geistliche Gesänge (Twelve German sacred songs), WoO VI/13, named "Ein alt' Lob- und Freudenlied von der Urstend unsers lieben Herrn Christi" (An old song of praise and joy of the resurrection of our dear Lord Christ). Settings from the 20th century include organ works by Oskar Gottlieb Blarr and Hermann Schroeder. Enjott Schneider composed a setting for four-part choir with optional organ in 2012.
