= Wipo of Burgundy =

11th-century priest, poet and chronicler

Wipo
- Born: Wigbert (presumably) c. 995; Solothurn (uncertain)
- Died: c. 1050 (aged 54–55)
- Other name: Wippo
- Occupations: Priest; poet; chronicler
- Notable work: Gesta Chuonradi II imperatoris; Victimae paschali laudes

Wipo of Burgundy (also Wippo or Wigbert; c. 995 – c. 1050), often simply Wipo, was a priest, poet and chronicler. He was a chaplain to the Holy Roman Emperor Conrad II and may have acted as a tutor to his son Henry III, to whom he dedicated a number of works. His biography of Conrad II, entitled Gesta Chuonradi II imperatoris, is a key source for Conrad's reign. The well-known musical sequence, Victimae paschali laudes is often attributed to him, though its authenticity remains uncertain.

== Life ==
Information on Wipo's life is chiefly available from his writings. His name, sometimes spelled "Wippo", is a shortened form of "Wigbert". It is believed that he was born in the Swabian German-speaking portion of the Burgundy, because his name is Swabian. He shows a close interest in Burgundian affairs in his writings, and claims to have personally known Henry I, Bishop of Lausanne (985–1018). In the course of his education he gained close familiarity with the Vulgate Bible and with a classical Latin texts. He does not refer to any patristic texts. Volker Huth argues that the prologue of the Gesta Chuonradi shows philosophical affinities with the 9th-century theologian Helperic, who was based at the Abbey of Saint-Germain d'Auxerre in northwestern Burgundy.

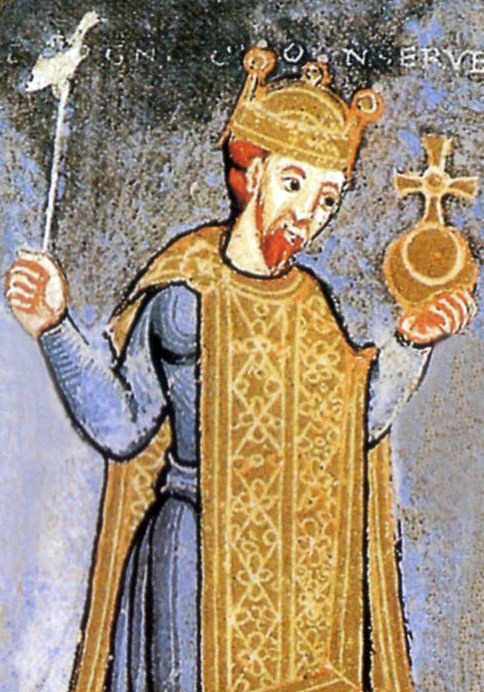
11th-century miniature of Emperor Henry III, to whom Wipo dedicated most of his surviving works.

Present at the election of Conrad II as King of the Germans in 1024, he most likely followed the emperor on his campaigns into Burgundy (1033) and against the Slavs (1035), both of which he describes in detail in his writings. The didactic tone that he adopts in writings dedicated to Henry III might indicate that he had been his tutor. After Conrad's death in 1039, he remained at court. He may be the same as a "Wipert" who is named as Henry III's confessor in the Annales Palidenses. The latest event that Wipo refers to in his writings is the coronation of Henry III as emperor in 1046. It is unclear how long he lived after that.

== Gesta Chuonradi ==
Wipo's most well-known work is the Gesta Chuonradi II imperatoris (The Deeds of Emperor Conrad II), "the major and almost the sole nonofficial source for [Conrad's] reign" and an important source for the developing ideology of "pontifical kingship" which would culminate in the Investiture Controversy under Conrad's grandson Henry IV. Wipo presented this work to Conrad's son Henry III in 1046, shortly after Henry was crowned Emperor. The text opens with a letter to Henry III and a prologue. In the prologue, written before 1046, the work is presented as a pair of biographies, of Conrad and Henry. In the letter, written after 1046, the life of Conrad is presented as an independent work. The narrative opens with Conrad's election in 1024 and continues through his reign in an annalistic format, concluding with his death in 1039. Wipo's main source was his own memory and oral reports from other members of the court, but he also employed a chronicle written at the Reichenau Abbey. Wipo strews short snatches of hexameter poetry throughout the work, and appends a nine verse canticle in rhymed hexameters, which he wrote at the time of Conrad's death at the end of the biography.

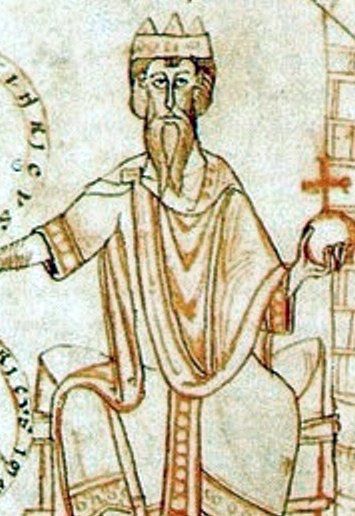
Miniature of Conrad II, subject of Wipo's Gesta Chuonradi II imperatoris

The opening letter and prologue claim that the work was intended to provide an account of an exemplary contemporary Christian prince, as a counterpoint to the Biblical kings of the Old Testament and the pagan rulers known from Classical literature. Both the Vulgate text of the Bible and Classical authors, especially Sallust and Macrobius' commentary on the Dream of Scipio, are frequently alluded to in the text. Wipo generally presents Conrad in very positive terms, sometimes modifying the facts in order to make Conrad a better exemplar. However, he declares himself willing to criticise Conrad for errors, and occasionally does so. Most biographies in Wipo's time were lives of saints or of kings presented as saintly figures, so the decision to write about Conrad as a layman was an innovative one. Karl F. Morrison characterises the work as "an honest if not penetrating annalistic account of a secular ruler in unecclesiastical, unsanctimonious terms." The work was not widely read in the Middle Ages and now survives in only a single manuscript held in the Generallandesarchiv in Karlsruhe.

== Other works ==
Among Wipo's other extant writings are the maxims, Proverbia (1027 or 1028), and Tetralogus Heinrici in rhymed hexameters. Presented to Henry in 1041, the Tetralogus is a eulogy of the emperor mixed with earnest exhortations, emphasising that right and law are the real foundations of the throne. The Gesta Chuonradi refers to other poetic works that are now lost: a Gallinarius (probably on Conrad's conquest of Burgundy), a hundred verses on the especially cold Burgundian winter of 1033, and an account of Conrad's 1035 campaign against the Slavs and the massacre that followed.

The famous sequence for Easter, Victimae paschali laudes is also attributed to Wipo, but this is uncertain.

== Editions and translations ==
- Harry Bresslau (ed.): Scriptores rerum Germanicarum in usum scholarum separatim editi 61: Die Werke Wipos (Wiponis Opera). Hanover, 1915 (Monumenta Germaniae Historica, digitalised)
- Mommsen, Theodore E.; Morrison, Karl F. (2000). "The Deeds of Conrad II". Imperial Lives and Letters of the Eleventh Century. New York, NY: Columbia University Press. pp. 52–100. ISBN 978-0-231-12121-7.
