= Victimae paschali laudes =

Liturgical sequence for Easter Sunday

"Victimæ paschali laudes" is a sequence prescribed for the Catholic Mass and Anglican and Lutheran (Note: The German translation is known as Christ ist erstanden.) Eucharistic services on Easter Sunday. It is usually attributed to the 11th-century Wipo of Burgundy, chaplain to Holy Roman Emperor Conrad II, but has also been attributed to Notker Balbulus, Robert II of France, and Adam of St. Victor.

"Victimæ paschali laudes" is one of only four medieval sequences that were preserved in the Roman Missal of the Tridentine Mass published in 1570 after the Council of Trent (1545–1563). The three others were "Veni Sancte Spiritus" for the feast of Pentecost, "Lauda Sion" for Corpus Christi, and "Dies irae" for the Requiem Mass (a fifth sequence, "Stabat Mater" for the Feast of the Seven Dolours of the Blessed Virgin Mary, was added to the missal by Pope Benedict XIII in 1727). Before Trent, many other feasts also had their own sequences, and some sixteen different sequences for Easter were in use.

"Victimæ paschali laudes" is one of the few sequences that are still in liturgical use today. Its text was set to music by many Renaissance and Baroque composers, including Busnois, Josquin, Lassus, Willaert, Hans Buchner, Palestrina, Byrd, Perosi, and Fernando de las Infantas. Chorales derived from the sequence include "Christ ist erstanden" (12th century) and Martin Luther's "Christ lag in Todes Banden".

A section beginning Credendum est, with its pejorative reference to the Jews, was deleted in the 1570 missal, which also replaced praecedet suos (his own) with praecedet vos (you), and added "Amen" and "Alleluia" to the end.

== Text ==
Latin	English (literal)	English (The English Hymnal)	English (ICEL)
Victimæ paschali laudes immolent Christiani.	Let Christians offer sacrificial praises to the passover victim.	Christians, to the Paschal Victim Offer your thankful praises!	Christians, to the Paschal Victim offer sacrifice and praise.
Agnus redemit oves: Christus innocens Patri reconciliavit peccatores.	The lamb has redeemed the sheep: The Innocent Christ has reconciled the sinners to the Father.	A Lamb the sheep redeemeth: Christ, who only is sinless, Reconcileth sinners to the Father;	The sheep are ransomed by the Lamb; and Christ, the undefiled, hath sinners to his Father reconciled.
Mors et vita duello conflixere mirando: dux vitæ mortuus, regnat vivus.	Death and life contended in a spectacular battle: the dead leader of life reigns alive.	Death and life have contended In that combat stupendous: The Prince of Life, who died, reigns immortal.	Death with life contended: combat strangely ended! Life's own Champion, slain, yet lives to reign.
Dic nobis Maria, quid vidisti in via?	Tell us, Mary, what did you see on the way?	Speak Mary, declaring What thou sawest wayfaring:	Tell us, Mary: say what thou didst see upon the way.
Sepulcrum Christi viventis, et gloriam vidi resurgentis	"I saw the tomb of the living Christ and the glory of his rising,	"The Tomb of Christ, who is living. The glory of Jesu’s Resurrection;	"The tomb the Living did enclose; I saw Christ's glory as He rose!
Angelicos testes, sudarium, et vestes.	The angelic witnesses, the shroud, and the clothes.	Bright angels attesting, The shroud and napkin resting.	The angels there attesting; shroud with grave-clothes resting.
Surrexit Christus spes mea: præcedet suos [vos] in Galilæam.	Christ my hope is arisen; he will go before his own [you] into Galilee."	Yea, Christ my hope is arisen: To Galilee he goes before you."	Christ, my hope, has risen: He goes before you into Galilee."
[Credendum est magis soli Mariæ veraci Quam Judæorum Turbæ fallaci.]	[More to be believed is truthful Mary by herself than the deceitful crowd of the Jews.]	Happy they who hear the witness, Mary's word believing Above the tales of Jewry deceiving.	
Scimus Christum surrexisse a mortuis vere: tu nobis, victor Rex, miserere. [Amen.] [Alleluia.]	We know Christ is truly risen from the dead! On us, you conqueror, King, have mercy! Amen. [Alleluia.]	Christ indeed from death is risen, our new life obtaining. Have mercy, victor King, ever reigning!	That Christ is truly risen from the dead we know. Victorious King, Thy mercy show! Amen. Alleluia.

Victimae Paschali Laudes
A recording by a soprano.

=== Jane E. Leeson's translation ===
This metric paraphrase is commonly sung to various tunes, including Victimae Paschali, St George's Windsor, or, with alleluias, to Easter Hymn or Llanfair.

Christ the Lord is risen today;
Christians, haste your vows to pay;
Offer ye your praises meet
At the Paschal Victim's feet.
For the sheep the Lamb hath bled,
Sinless in the sinner's stead;
"Christ is risen," today we cry;
Now He lives no more to die.

Christ, the victim undefiled,
Man to God hath reconciled;
Whilst in strange and awful strife
Met together Death and Life:
Christians, on this happy day
Haste with joy your vows to pay;
"Christ is risen," today we cry;
Now He lives no more to die.

Say, O wondering Mary, say,
what thou sawest on thy way.
'I beheld, where Christ had lain,
empty tomb and angels twain,
I beheld the glory bright
of the rising Lord of light;
Christ my hope is risen again;
now he lives, and lives to reign.'

Christ, who once for sinners bled,
Now the first born from the dead,
Throned in endless might and power,
Lives and reigns forevermore.
Hail, eternal Hope on high!
Hail, Thou King of victory!
Hail, Thou Prince of life adored!
Help and save us, gracious Lord.

== Musical settings ==
The French composer Jehan Revert composed a setting for four-part choir and organ.
