= Rothbroicher Bach =

River in Germany

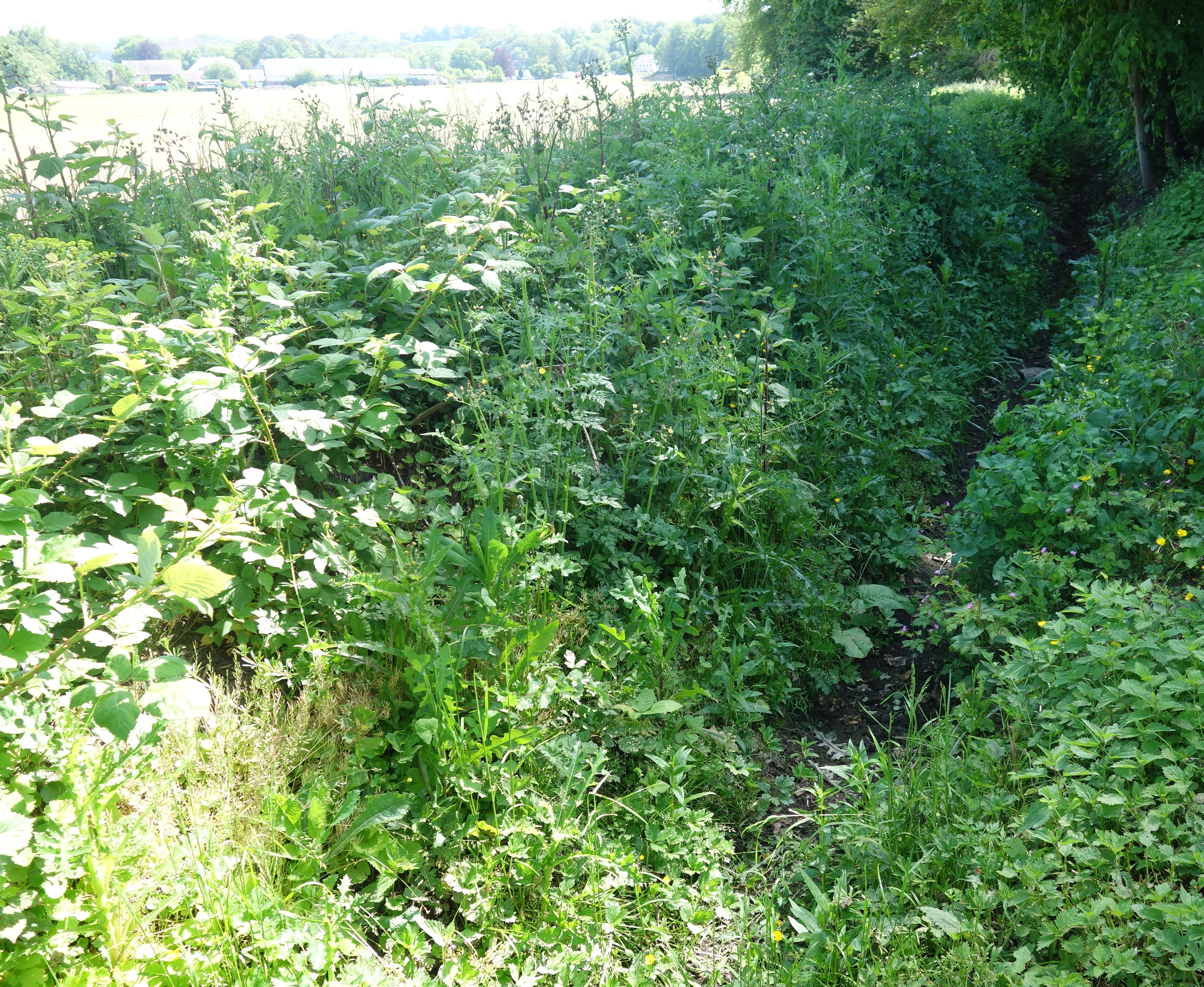

Location
- Country: Germany
- States: North Rhine-Westphalia

Physical characteristics
- Mouth
  - location: Dhünn
  - coordinates: 51.0261°N 7.0773°E

Basin features
- Progression: Dhünn→ Wupper→ Rhine→ North Sea

Rothbroicher Bach is a small river of North Rhine-Westphalia, Germany. It is 1.4 km (0.9 mi) long and flows as a left tributary into the Dhünn near Odenthal.

== See also ==
- List of rivers of North Rhine-Westphalia
