= Scharrenberger Bach =

River in Germany

Location
- Country: Germany
- States: North Rhine-Westphalia

Physical characteristics
- Mouth
  - location: Dhünn
  - coordinates: 51.0258°N 7.0909°E

Basin features
- Progression: Dhünn→ Wupper→ Rhine→ North Sea

Scharrenberger Bach is a small river of North Rhine-Westphalia, Germany. It is 1.3 km (0.8 mi) long and flows as a left tributary into the Dhünn near Odenthal.

== See also ==
- List of rivers of North Rhine-Westphalia
