= Haus Altenberg =

Coordinates: 51.054565°N 7.132994°E

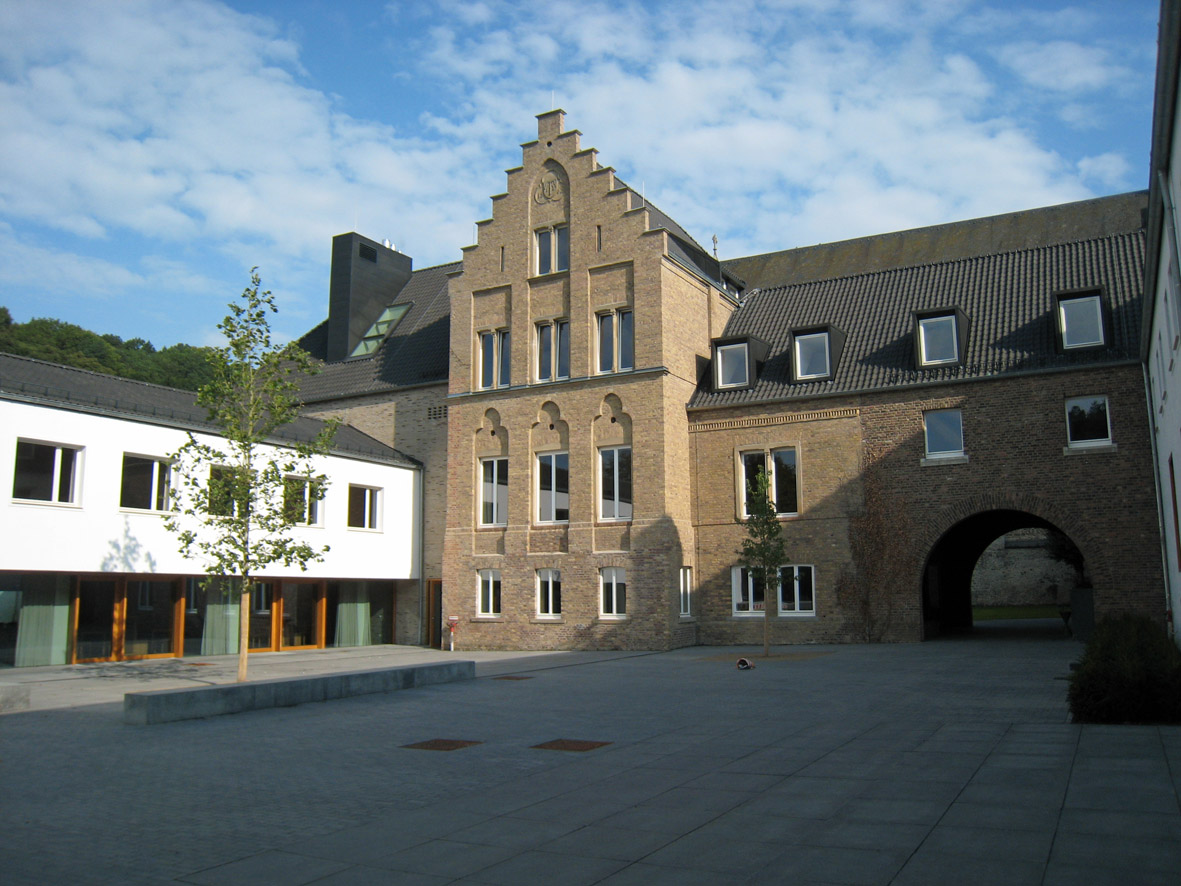
Haus Altenberg in 2017

Haus Altenberg is a house for education and meetings of young people (Jugendbildungsstätte) of the Diocese of Cologne, located in Altenberg, now part of Odenthal, North Rhine-Westphalia, Germany. It was the centre of the Katholische Jugendbewegung in Germany from 1926 to 1954, interrupted only during World War II. Owned by the diocese, it is run by the association Jugendbildungsstätte Haus Altenberg.

== History ==
The abbey around the Altenberger Dom, founded in 1133, was closed in 1803. In 1863, a house called "Erzbischöfliche Villa" was built adjacent to the church.

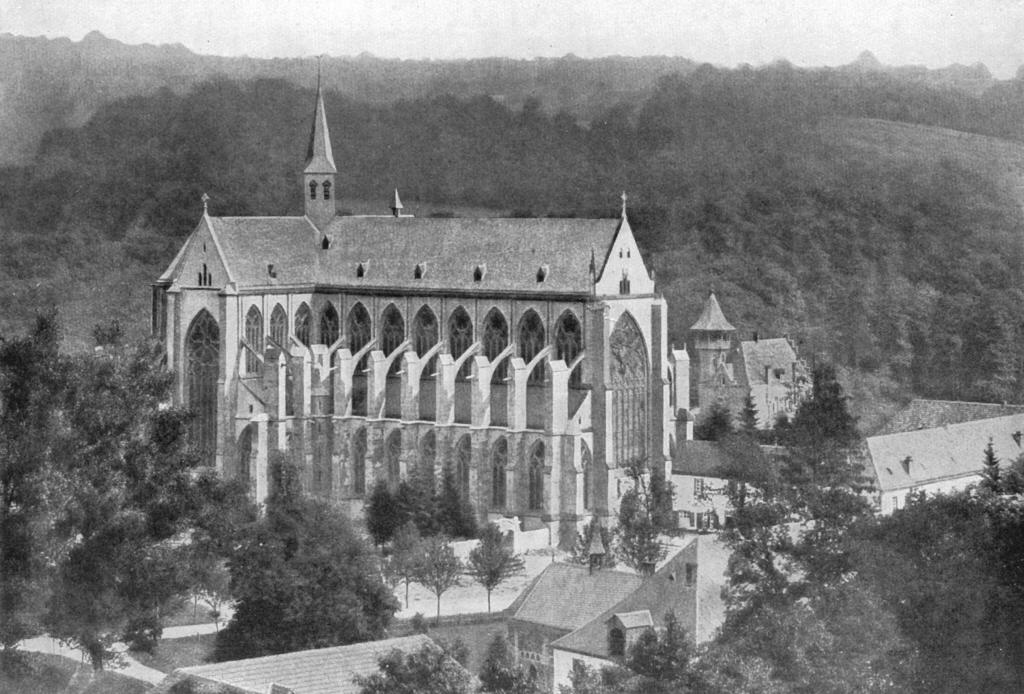
Altenberger Dom with the adjacent Haus Altenberg in 1925

Ludwig Wolker developed the house from 1926 to a centre of the Katholische Jugendbewegung (Catholic youth movement) for the training of young men for work with groups of young people. He declared the statue of Mary in the church as Königin des Bundes (Queen of the union). From 1934, Catholic youth organisations were gradually restricted by the Nazi regime to strictly religious actions. They focused therefore on light processions and pilgrimages. Altenberg became the destination of youth pilgrimages to the statue of Mary. Georg Thurmair wrote a Marian song in 1935, "Nun, Brüder, sind wir frohgemut", which became with the melody by Adolf Lohmann the "Altenberger Wallfahrtslied" (Altenberg pilgrimage song).

Haus Altenberg was occupied by police and Gestapo twelve time, and closed in 1942. It was then used as a home for senior citizens from Cologne whose own homes had been bombed.

After World War II, Wolker renewed the work of the youth organisation. He founded in 1946 the association Verlag Haus Altenberg, which has published material related to pedagogy since. Cardinal Joseph Frings appointed Wolker Rektor of Haus Altenberg in 1948, also the leader of a new organisation, Bischöflichen Hauptstelle für Jugendseelsorge.

In 1954, that organisation returned to the restored Jugendhaus Düsseldorf. Haus Altenberg has been a house for young people of the Diocese of Cologne, hosting both events of the diocese as more general conferences and educational events. From 1976, the buildings were restored and expanded, designed by Paul Georg Hopmann. From 2013, the buildings were adjusted to meet demands for fire protection and energy preservation. They are barrier-free while the historic exterior was kept. It was reopened on 14 August 2016.

== Literature ==
- Altenberger Blätter
- Landschaft und Geschichte (ed.): Auf Spurensuche in Altenberg. Landschaft und Geschichte im Herzen des Bergischen Landes. Gaasterland Verlag, o.O 2006, ISBN 3-935873-06-9 (authors: Manfred Link, David Bosbach, Randolf Link), darin Spuren der Jugend, pp 40ff.
- Tanja Junggeburth: Chronik der Jugendbildungsstätte Haus Altenberg, 2016
