= Eifgenbach =

River in Germany

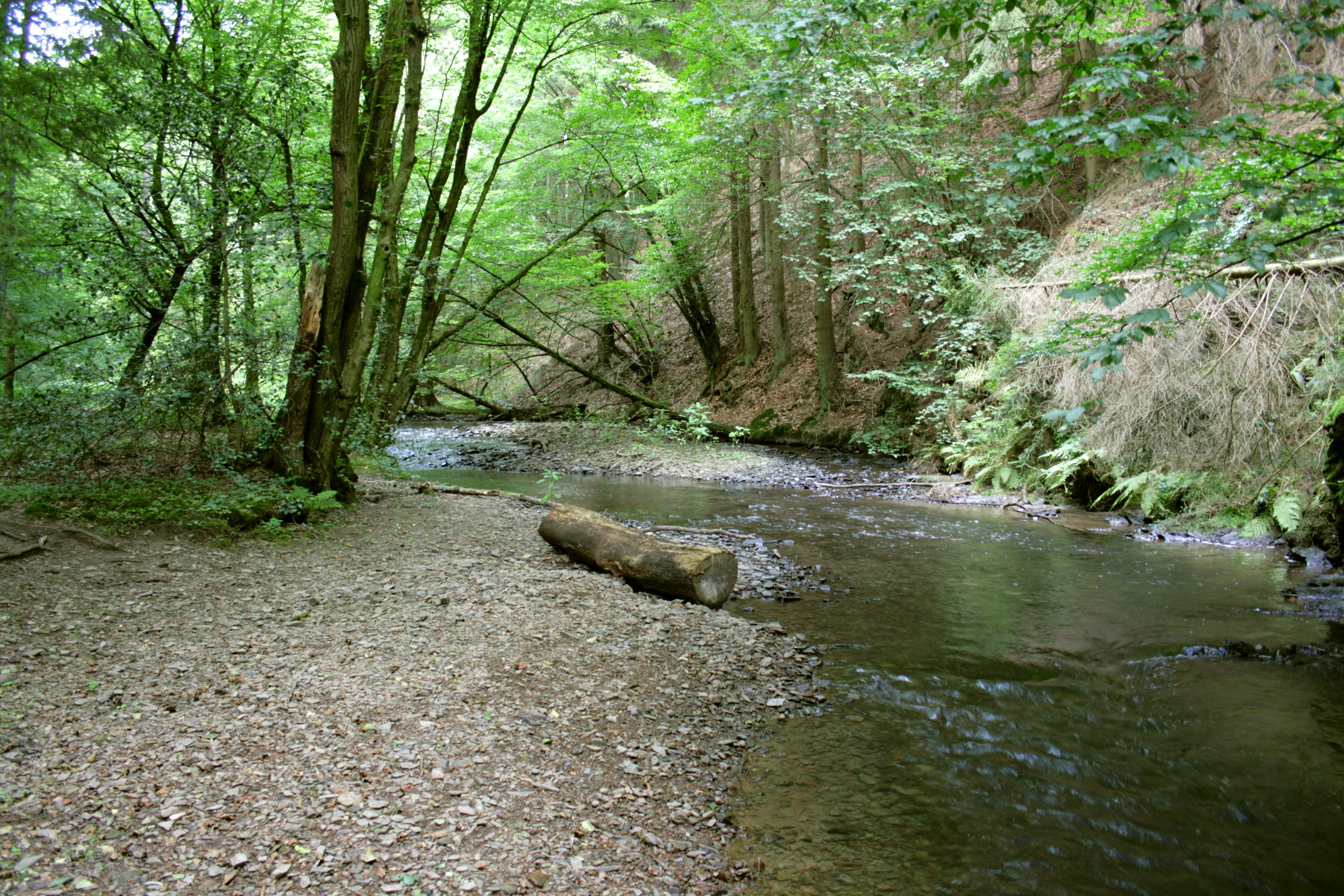
- Eifgenbach south of Eifgenburg

Location
- Country: Germany
- State: North Rhine-Westphalia

Physical characteristics
- Source
  - location: Near Wermelskirchen
  - coordinates: 51°08′40″N 7°15′48″E
  - elevation: 336 m (1,102 ft)
- Mouth
  - location: Near Odenthal into the Dhünn
  - elevation: 95 m (312 ft)
- Length: 20.5 km (12.7 mi)

Basin features
- Progression: Dhünn→ Wupper→ Rhine→ North Sea

Eifgenbach is a 20.5-kilometre-long (12.7 mi) river of North Rhine-Westphalia, Germany. Its source is near Wermelskirchen, appr. 15 km (9.3 mi) south of Wuppertal. It runs in south-westerly direction, and its mouth into the river Dhünn is near Odenthal, appr. 15 km (9.3 mi) north-east of Cologne.

190 hectares (460 acres) of the river basin of the Eifgenbach and its tributaries have been declared nature reserve in order to protect its bio-diversity.

About 1 km (0.62 mi) below the mouth into the Dhünn lies the Altenberger Dom, a monastery church built from 1255 on by Adolf IV, Count of Berg in Gothic style. Today the church belongs to the German state of North Rhine-Westfalia and is used both by the Protestants and Catholics as shared church.

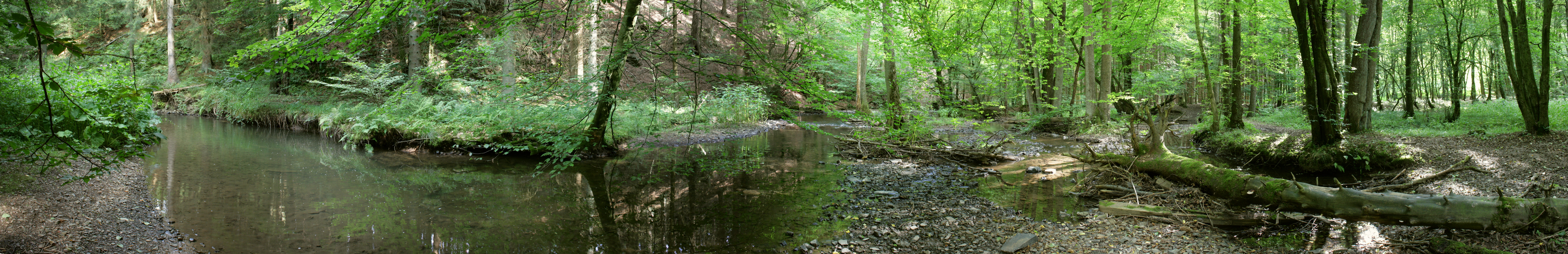
Natural river bed in the Riparian forest near Burscheid

== See also ==
- List of rivers of North Rhine-Westphalia
