= Lötzelbach =

River in Germany

Location
- Country: Germany
- State: North Rhine-Westphalia

Physical characteristics
- Source
  - location: North of Leimbacher Berg
  - elevation: 96 m (315 ft)
- Mouth
  - location: Leverkusen-Schlebusch into Dhünn
  - coordinates: 51.0335°N 7.0556°E
  - elevation: 59 m (194 ft)
- Length: 1.17 km (0.73 mi)

Basin features
- Progression: Dhünn→ Wupper→ Rhine→ North Sea

Lötzelbach is a small river of North Rhine-Westphalia, Germany. It flows into the Dhünn in Leverkusen-Schlebusch.

== See also ==
- List of rivers of North Rhine-Westphalia
