= Ophover Mühlenbach =

River in Germany

Location
- Country: Germany
- States: North Rhine-Westphalia

Physical characteristics
- Mouth
  - location: Dhünn
  - coordinates: 51.0314°N 7.0366°E

Basin features
- Progression: Dhünn→ Wupper→ Rhine→ North Sea

Ophover Mühlenbach is a river of North Rhine-Westphalia, Germany. It is 4.6 km (2.9 mi) long and flows as a right tributary into the Dhünn near Leverkusen.

== See also ==
- List of rivers of North Rhine-Westphalia
