= Mittelbuschbach =

River in Germany

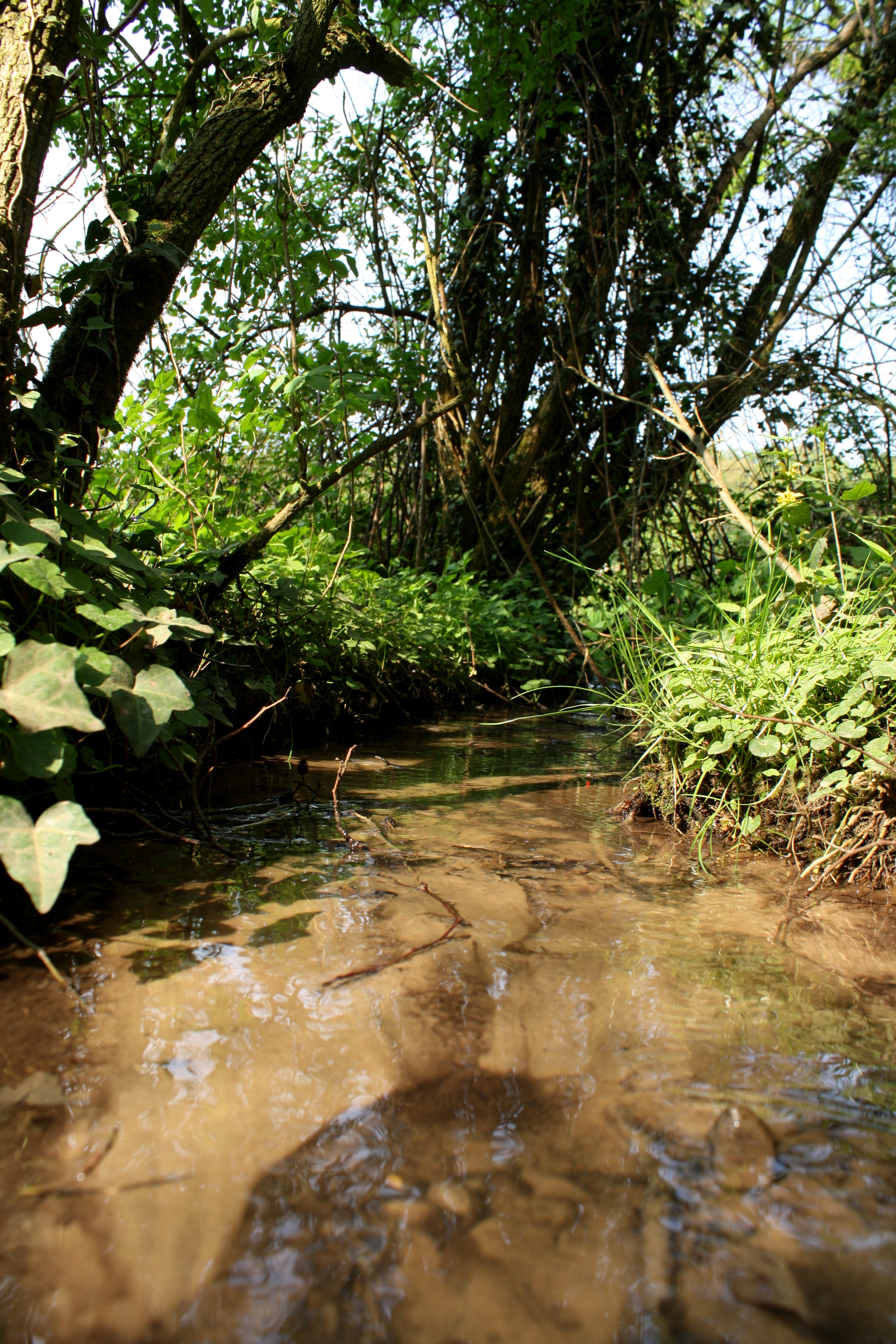

Location
- Country: Germany
- State: North Rhine-Westphalia

Physical characteristics
- Mouth
  - location: Dhünn
  - coordinates: 51.0267°N 7.0847°E
- Length: 0.89 km (0.55 mi)

Basin features
- Progression: Dhünn→ Wupper→ Rhine→ North Sea

Mittelbuschbach is a small river in North Rhine-Westphalia, Germany. It flows into the Dhünn near Leverkusen.

== See also ==
- List of rivers of North Rhine-Westphalia
