= Dein Lob, Herr, ruft der Himmel aus =

German Catholic hymn

- German Catholic hymn
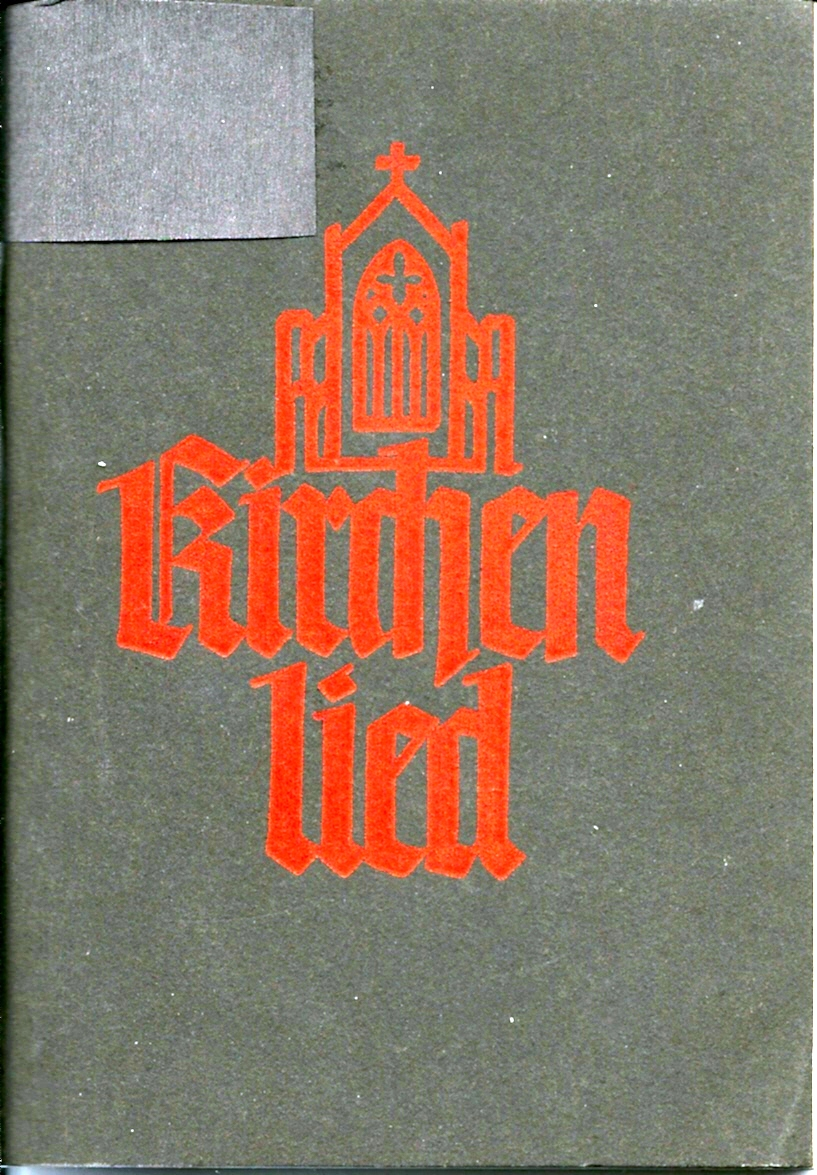
- Cover of Kirchenlied (second edition, 1938), which included the hymn as No. 1
- English: The sky shouts your praise, Lord
- Text: by Adolf Lohmann after Albert Curtz
- Language: German
- Based on: Psalm 19
- Composed: 1669
- Published: 1938

"Dein Lob, Herr, ruft der Himmel aus" (Your Praise, Lord, Heaven proclaims) is a German Catholic hymn. Adolf Lohmann adapted a 1659 hymn by the Jesuit astronomer Albert Curtz, who paraphrased Psalm 19. The melody appeared in Augsburg in 1669. It was No. 1 in the 1938 hymnal Kirchenlied and is part of the German Catholic hymnal Gotteslob as GL 381.

== History ==
Adolf Lohmann wrote the song "Dein Lob, Herr, ruft der Himmel aus" as a revision of a hymn by the Jesuit astronomer Albert Curtz, published in 1659 as a paraphrase of Psalm 19 (The heavens declare the glory of God). The melody was taken from an Augsburg hymnal from 1669. The song expresses the praise of the created world for the Creation.

The song was included as No. 1 in the 1938 hymnal Kirchenlied by Georg Thurmair and Lohmann, leading the first section of praise, titled "Großer Gott, wir loben dich". In the first common Catholic hymnal, the 1975 Gotteslob, the song appeared as GL 263. In the 2013 edition of Gotteslob, it is GL 381 in the section Lob, Dank und Anbetung (Praise, thanks and adoration).

== Text and theme ==
The song is in five stanzas of six lines each, rhyming AABCCB. The first stanza reflects that the blue sky, white day and black night praise their creator. The second stanza states that all people around the Earth, from the sunrise to sunset, hear the news of the Creator's power. In the third stanza, the singers acknowledge that God's law is brighter than the sun and enlightens their lives. The last two stanzas are written in the first person, praying for protection from the temptations of the proud world ("stolze Welt"). The last thought is confidence in redemption in all kinds of distress ("du wirst mich ja in aller Not / durch deine Kraft erlösen").

== Melody and musical settings ==
The melody is in a triple meter, alternating regularly half notes and quarter notes. It begins with an upward fanfare, but the second half remains quieter.

The song was set to music in choral versions, such as a three-part setting by Thomas Kiefer, published by Carus-Verlag in 2013. Hubert Schwarz used the name as the title of a collection of 16 organ pieces on hymns from the Protestant hymnal Evangelisches Gesangbuch and the Gotteslob, published by Merseburger Verlag. These settings try to improve the emotional impact of the hymns.
