= Adolf Lohmann =

German music educator and composer

- Born: 10 January 1907; Düsseldorf
- Died: 19 October 1983 (aged 76)
- Occupations: Chorale conductor; Music educator; Composer of sacred music

Adolf Lohmann (10 January 1907 – 19 October 1983) was a German music educator and a composer of sacred music. Several of his hymn melodies are part of the Catholic hymnal Gotteslob.

== Career ==
Born in Düsseldorf, Lohmann worked there as a music teacher and Fachberater für Schulmusik (advisor for school music). In 1937, he was moved to Goch by the Nazi Kultusbehörde. He returned to Düsseldorf in 1949.

Lohmann conducted several choirs, including youth choirs. He organizes continued education in music and training of choral conductors, often at Haus Altenberg. He composed melodies for several hymns by Georg Thurmair, which contradicted the Nazi ideology by a focus on Jesus and the church. He was in 1938 one of the publishers of Kirchenlied, an attempt to create a common hymnal for German-speaking Catholics.

He worked for the Christophorus-Verlag, publishing several song books and choir books. He composed 150 songs, 30 canons and about 450 settings for choir or orchestra.

== Hymn in Gotteslob ==
- Dein Lob, Herr, ruft der Himmel aus, paraphrasing a 1659 hymn by Albert Curtz after Psalm 19

== Melodies in Gotteslob ==
- "O Herr, aus tiefer Klage" GL 271
- "Singt dem Herrn ein neues Lied" GL 409
- "Wir sind nur Gast auf Erden" GL 505
- "Dein Reich, o Herr, wird kommen" regional
- "Herz Jesu, Gottes Opferbrand" GL 371, text by Franz Johannes Weinrich
- "Macht weit die Pforten in der Welt" GL 360
- "Nun, Brüder, sind wir frohgemut" regional

== Literature ==
- Wilhelm Schepping: Der Kirchenliedkomponist Adolf Lohmann (1907–1983). Zur Bedeutung seines musikalischen Nachlasses, in: Kirchenmusikalisches Jahrbuch 80 (1996), pp 9–31.
