= Lasst uns loben, freudig loben =

Christian hymn

- Christian hymn
- English: Let us praise, joyfully praise
- Written: 1948
- Text: by Georg Thurmair
- Language: German
- Melody: by Erhard Quack

"Lasst uns loben, freudig loben" (Let us praise, joyfully praise) is a Christian hymn in German. It was written by Georg Thurmair in 1948, then beginning "Laßt uns loben, Brüder, loben" (Let us praise, brothers, praise). The melody was composed by Erhard Quack the same year. It is part of the Catholic hymnal Gotteslob (2013) and other hymnals.

== History ==
Georg Thurmair wrote the song "Lasst uns loben, Brüder, loben" in 1948. It was set to music the same year by Erhard Quack, revised in 1971. It was included in the common Catholic hymnal in German, Gotteslob in 1975, as GL 84. The word "Brüder" in the first line was understood as meaning only men which seemed unacceptable in the 1990. In copies of the Gotteslob, a new version was glued into the books, using the adverb "freudig" (joyfully) instead of "Brüder", because the neutral word "Geschwister" (siblings) would not match the metre. With this wording, it became part of the 2013 edition of Gotteslob as GL 489, in the section Leben in der Kirche – Taufe (life in the church – baptism. It is part of other hymnals and songbooks.
