= Singt dem Herrn ein neues Lied (Kempf) =

Christian hymn in German

- Christian hymn in German
- English: Sing a new song unto the Lord
- Related: Psalm 98
- Written: 1941
- Text: by Georg Alfred Kempf
- Language: German
- Melody: by Adolf Lohmann
- Composed: 1956

"Singt dem Herrn ein neues Lied" ("Sing a New Song unto the Lord") is a Christian hymn in German. It was written by Georg Alfred Kempf, a Protestant pastor in Alsace, in 1941. With a 1956 melody by Adolf Lohmann, it is part of the common German Catholic hymnal Gotteslob (2013).

== History ==
Georges Alfred Kempf was born on 10 December 1916 in Val d'Ajo, Département des Vosges, Alsace, the son of farmers in the mountains (Bergbauern). As a young farmer, he entered the Hermannsburg Mission Seminary in Lower Saxony, and studied Protestant theology further in Erlangen, Tübingen and Strasbourg. He was pastor in several villages in Alsace. From 1946, he published Fraternité Evangélique, an illustrated monthly paper, and from 1962 to 1978 Le Messager Évangélique, a weekly church paper. He was leader of a Jugendspielschar (theatre group of young people) and wrote several plays about Biblical scenes for them. Kempf died in Ingwiller, Alsace, on 24 March 2013.

He wrote the poem "Singt dem Herrn ein neues Lied" in 1941. At the time, Alsace had been annexed by Nazi Germany. In his French version, it begins "Louez Dieu d’un chant nouveau, qui peut l’interdire?" The beginning of the poem is reminiscent of the call to sing a new song to the Lord as in Psalm 98, and the second line already mentions conflict: "Niemand solls euch wehren" (nobody shall deny it to you).

In the first common German Catholic hymnal, the 1975 Gotteslob, the song appeared as GL 268 with Lohmann's melody. In the 2013 edition, it is GL 409. It is also part of other songbooks.

== Text ==
The poem is in four stanzas of seven lines each, rhyming ABABCCB. The first stanza begins with the call to sing a new song to the Lord, as in Psalm 96 and Psalm 98. It then mentions that God never rests (paraphrasing Psalm 121:4), and that he still works miracles today. The second stanza expresses that his mercy is new every day (based on Lamentations 3:23), even on ways through Night ("durch Nacht"). The third stanza looks back on past support (as mentioned in Deuteronomy 1:31) and calls for confidence ("Zuversicht"). The fourth stanza concludes on this basis to sing a new songs to him, wherever the sun "looks" (Allsoweit die Sonne sieht), paraphrasing Psalm 113:3, and let it sound brightly ("lasst es hell erklingen").

== Melodies and musical settings ==
Adolf Lohmann composed a melody in 1952, and revised it in 1956. It uses changing metre, 4/4, 5/4 and 6/4, indicating a new approach. Paul Horn composed a cantata for three voices and instruments in 1978, published by Carus-Verlag. The music is independent from Lohmann's melody, is in common time and treats the stanzas differently, with a prelude and an interlude. In 2008, Josef Friedrich Doppelbauer composed a four-part setting, again by Carus. After the publication of the second edition of the Gotteslob in 2013, a three-part setting was included in the accompanying Chorbuch Gotteslob by Carus-Verlag.
