= Nun lässest du, o Herr =

Christian hymn

- Christian hymn
- English: Now you let, o Lord
- Occasion: Compline; funeral
- Written: 1966
- Text: by Georg Thurmair
- Language: German
- Based on: Nunc dimittis
- Melody: by Loys Bourgeois; Catholic Book of Worship III

"Nun lässest du, o Herr" (Now you let, o Lord [... me go into your peace]) is a Christian hymn by Georg Thurmair written in 1966 as a paraphrase of the Nunc dimittis canticle. It was part of the German Catholic hymnal Gotteslob of 1975 as GL 660 with a 16th-century melody by Loys Bourgeois. With this melody, it is also part of the Protestant hymnal Evangelisches Gesangbuch as EG 695. It is part of the second edition of the Gotteslob as GL 500, with a new 1994 melody.

== History ==
Thurmair, a publisher of the 1938 ecumenical hymnal Kirchenlied, wrote the text "Nun lässest du, o Herr" in 1966 as a paraphrase of the Nunc dimittis, Simeon's canticle from the Gospel of Luke, which became part of daily prayers such as Catholic compline and Anglican evensong. It is especially commemorated on the feast of the Purification on 2 February, and often used for funerals.

Thurmair's hymn became part of the first Catholic hymnal Gotteslob of 1975 as GL 660, with a melody by Loys Bourgeois from the Genevan Psalter. With the same melody, it is also part of the Protestant hymnal Evangelisches Gesangbuch as EG 695. For the second edition of the Gotteslob in 2013, a different melody was used, derived in 2010 from a 1994 melody from the Catholic Book of Worship, vol. III, Ottawa (1994). The hymn appears as GL 500 in the section "Leben in der Kirche, Tod und Vollendung" (Life in the Church, death and perfection.

== Text ==
"Nun lässest du, o Herr" is in three stanzas of six short lines each, rhyming AABCCB. The first and the last stanza consist of one sentence, the middle stanza has two sentences of three lines each. In the Biblical narration, the old Simeon is present when Jesus is presented at the Temple, and says in the canticle (Nunc dimittis) that he can now depart in peace that his eyes saw his saviour, a light to the heathen and Israel. Thurmair introduces the hardship of the world ("der Welt Beschwer") in the first stanza as the situation of the singer speaking in the first person. He changed Simeon's phrase "depart in peace" to "go into your peace" ("in deinen Frieden gehen"). In the second stanza, he mentioned "the true light" ("das wahre Licht") that appeared, but made no explicit reference to Jesus. The third stanza is focused on the light which brought enlightenment into all night to recognize God, who is addressed as "Highest" ("das Licht, das aller Nacht Erleuchtung hat gebracht, dich, Höchster, zu erkennen").

== Melodies and settings ==
The text of "Nun lässest du, o Herr" was first associated with a 16th-century melody by Loys Bourgeois who had collaborated with Jean Calvin on the Genevan Psalter. For the 2013 edition of Gotteslob, a different melody was chosen which was derived in 2010 from a 1994 melody from Ottawa. It is in 6/8 time and in E minor, gradually rising in the first half, reaching the highest note in the upbeat to the second half, and then gradually declining.

A chorale prelude on the Bourgeoi melody was published by Bärenreiter in the collection for songs from Evangelischen Gesangbuch, titled Orgelbuch zum Evangelischen Gesangbuch. Ausgabe Rheinland, Westfalen, Lippe, Evangelisch reformierte Kirche. Landeskirchlicher Liederteil.
