= Alles meinem Gott zu Ehren =

Christian hymn

- Christian hymn
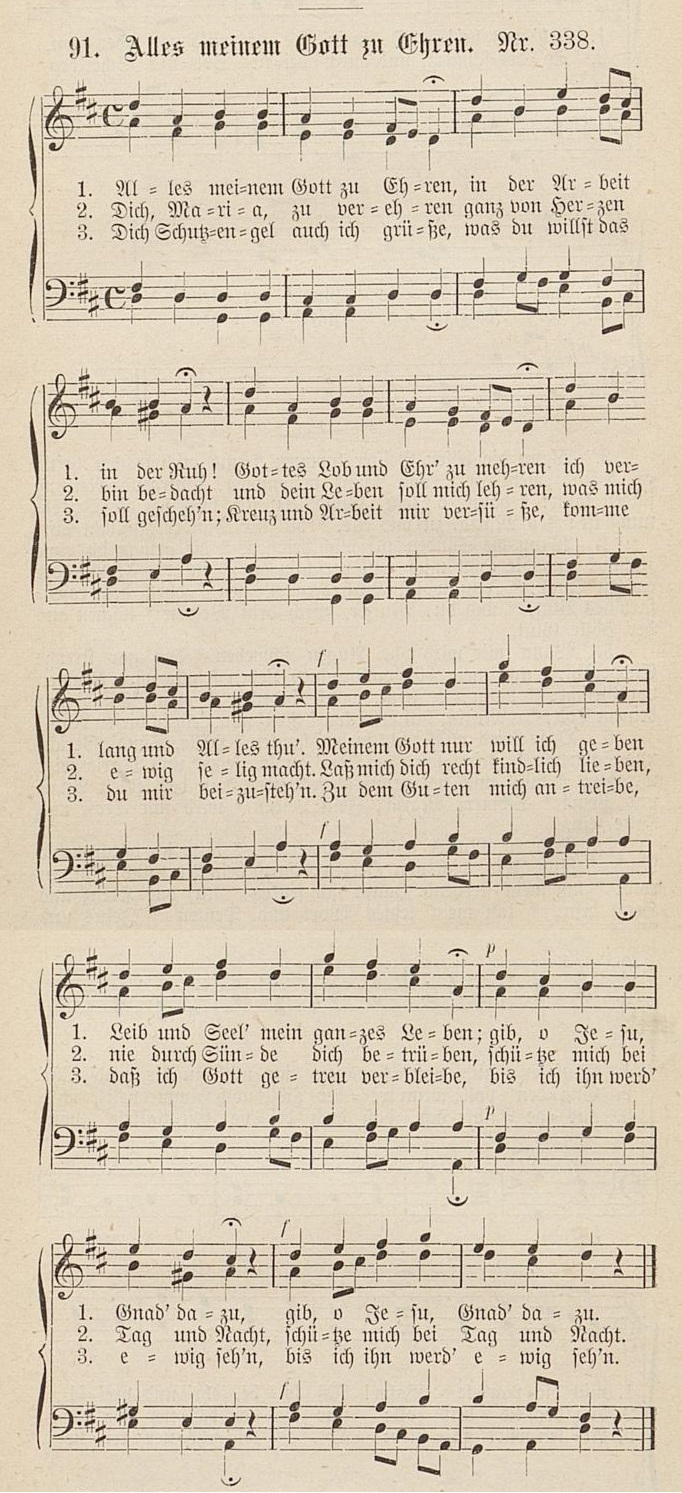
- Alles meinem Gott zu Ehren
- English: All to the honour of my God
- Written: 1724, 1963
- Text: by Melchior Ludolf Herold, Georg Thurmair
- Language: German
- Melody: from Bamberg
- Composed: 1732

"Alles meinem Gott zu Ehren" (All to the honour of my God) is a hymn with a text begun by Melchior Ludolf Herold in 1724. A melody was associated with it from 1732. Later versions retain the first stanza. One by Georg Thurmair is part of the Catholic German hymnal Gotteslob, and other hymnals and songbooks.

== History ==
The text of "Alles meinem Gott zu Ehren", by Melchior Ludolf Herold, appeared first in 1724 in a Jesuit hymnal as the refrain of a morning song. The melody associated with it appeared first in Bamberg in 1732. Georg Thurmair wrote in 1963 three additional stanzas for the first edition of the Catholic German hymnal Gotteslob, as GL 615. In the second edition of 2013 it is GL 455, in the section Sendung und Nachfolge. It is contained in other hymnals and songbooks.

== Text and music ==
The text of the 1724 stanza is:

1) Alles meinem Gott zu Ehren,
in der Arbeit, in der Ruh!
Gottes Lob und Ehr zu mehren,
ich verlang und alles tu.
Meinem Gott nur will ich geben
Leib und Seel, mein ganzes Leben.
Gib, o Jesu, Gnad dazu.
