= Nun singe Lob, du Christenheit =

- Christian hymn
- English: Now sing praise, you christendom
- Written: 1964)
- Text: by Georg Thurmair
- Language: German
- Melody: By Johann Crüger
- Composed: 1653

"Nun singe Lob, du Christenheit" (Now sing praise, you christendom) is a Christian hymn by Georg Thurmair, set to a 1653 melody by Johann Crüger. It is a song of praise, focused on unity within the church. The hymn in five stanzas of for lines each was written in 1964, revised in 1967. It is part of the current Catholic hymnal Gotteslob as GL 487, in the section "Kirche – Ökumene" (Church - Ecumene).

The lyrics begin with a call to christendom to sing praise to Father, Son and Spirit, who is always good. The second stanza reflects that he gives peace, joy, holiness and unity to his church. The third stanza prays that he may make us like siblings who delight in harmony ("der Eintracht uns erfreun"), and who renew Christianity as a mirror of his love. The fourth stanza addresses the Good Shepherd to assist his church in achieving one faith in one Lord. The final stanza addresses the Lord to make us faithful, free in the truth ("in der Wahrheit treu", so that our love may testify unity.

The melody by Johann Crüger was used for other hymns, originally "Nun danket all und bringet Ehr".

== Bibliography ==
- "Nun singe Lob, du Christenheit". liederdatenbank.de (in German).
- Nun singe Lob, du Christenheit (in German). Diocese of Limburg. 2013.
- "Nun singe Lob, du Christenheit (L) / Leben in der Kirche - Kirche - Ökumene" (in German). mein-gotteslob.de.
