= Nun, Brüder, sind wir frohgemut =

- German Catholic hymn
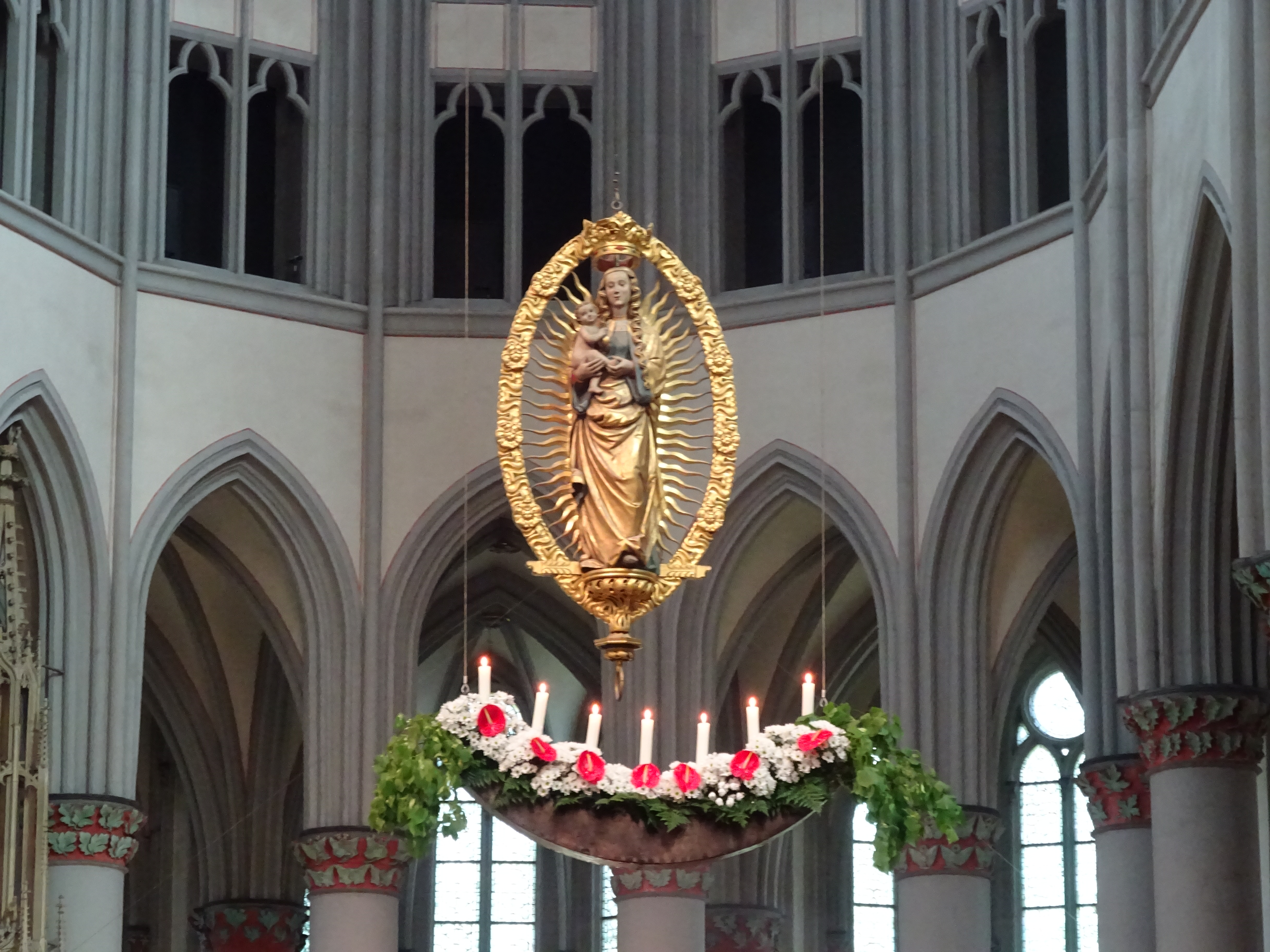
- 1530 sculpture of Mary in the Altenberger Dom, decorated in the Marian month of May
- English: Now, brothers, we are cheerful
- Written: 1935
- Text: by Georg Thurmair
- Language: German
- Melody: by Adolf Lohmann
- Published: 1938

"Nun, Brüder, sind wir frohgemut" (Now, brothers, we are cheerful) is a German Catholic hymn. It was written by Georg Thurmair as both a pilgrimage song and a Marian hymn. The melody was composed by Adolf Lohmann, who wrote a choral setting in 1936. Related to youth pilgrimages to an image of Mary at the Altenberger Dom, it is also known as "Altenberger Wallfahrtslied" (Altenberg pilgrimage song). The song is regarded as an Oppositionelles Lied (Oppositional song), in subtle protest against the Nazi regime.

In the process of adapting the text to gender-neutral language, the first line has been changed, replacing "brothers" by "we all", "friends" or "Christians". Several regional sections of the Catholic hymnal Gotteslob offer alternatives. It is "Nun sind wir alle frohgemut" in the Diocese of Hamburg, GL 902, "Nun, Freunde, sind wir frohgemut" in the Diocese of Münster of 1996, GL 875, and "Nun, Christen, sind wir frohgemut" in the Diocese of Limburg, GL 878.

== History ==
Haus Altenberg next to the Altenberger Dom was founded in 1922 as a meeting place for Catholic youth by Carl Mosterts. His successor Ludwig Wolker made it in 1926 the centre of the Catholic Jugendbewegung in Germany. From 1935, the movement was restricted to strictly religious meetings by the Nazi government, leading to an increase in events such as pilgrimages. The 1530 sculpture of Mary in the centre of the Altenberger Dom became the destination of processions, including Lichterprozessionen, processions with candles and torches at night. The tradition has continued after World War II as the Altenberger Licht.

Wolker declared the Madonna von Altenberg and the Königin des Bundes (Queen of the union) and encouraged the publication of a hymnal Kirchenlied, which became the source of common Christian singing in German. Several new songs were written, including works by the secretary of the youth movement, Georg Thurmair, set to music by Adolf Lohmann. One of them was the 1935 song "Nun, Brüder, sind wir frohgemut". Thousands of young people met for the processions until 1938.

The song expressed the protest of the Catholic youth in subtle, cryptic ways, for example by using metaphors such as dunkler Bann (dark ban), and by requesting of Mary: "Nun breite deine Hände aus, dann wird kein Feind uns schaden" (Now stretch out your hands, then no enemy will harm us.) The song became known as the "Altenberger Wallfahrtslied" (Altenberg pilgrimage song).

== Publication and reception ==
The hymn was first published in 1935 in the youth magazine Die Wacht for which Thurmair was an editor. It became known when it was included in the Kirchenlied in 1938, subtitled Eine Auslese geistlicher Lieder für die Jugend (A selection of spiritual song for the youth), a collection of 140 old and new hymns from different periods. Thurmair included the song also in a 1938 poetry collections, Die ersten Gedichte an die Freunde (The first poems to the friends), which was banned by the Nazis shortly after publication. The song has been regarded as an Oppositionelles Lied (Oppositional song), in subtle protest against the Nazi regime. Its text was distributed among young people also in form of a Schmuckblatt (Decorated leaf) useful to hang on a wall.

Adolf Lohmann wrote a five-part choral setting, which was published in 1936 as "Altenberger Wallfahrtslied" in the Zweite Mappe der Tonsätze zum Singeschiff. In the first common Catholic hymnal, the 1975 Gotteslob, it was not part of the common section (Stammteil), but in 16 regional sections. In the 2013 edition, it was again not included in the common section, but in several regional sections, however avoiding the term "Brüder" in the first line as not neutral to gender.
