= Georg Thurmair =

German poet, writer, journalist and author of documentary films

- Georg Thurmair, in the 1970s
- Born: 7 February 1909; Munich, German Empire
- Died: 20 January 1984 (aged 74); Munich, West Germany
- Occupations: Hymnwriter; Writer; Journalist
- Spouse: Maria Luise Thurmair
- Awards: Order of St. Sylvester

Georg Thurmair (7 February 1909 – 20 January 1984) was a German poet and hymnwriter who wrote around 300 hymns, a writer, journalist and author of documentary films.

== Career ==
Born in Munich, he took commercial training and worked from 1926 as a secretary at the Jugendhaus Düsseldorf. He became an assistant to Ludwig Wolker who had worked in Munich from 1923, but moved to Düsseldorf when he was elected president of the Katholischer Jungmännerverband Deutschlands. Thurmair studied at the Düsseldorf Abendgymnasium.

In 1932 Thurmair edited at a national meeting of the Sturmschar several editions of the weekly Junge Front, which was directed against the emerging National Socialism. The Nazis claimed the title, and it had to be renamed Michael in 1935, and was banned in 1936. Thurmair worked on two songbooks of the Jungmännerverband, Das graue Singeschiff and Das gelbe Singeschiff. From 1934, Thurmair was an editor of the youth journal Die Wacht, which first published in 1935 his hymns "Nun, Brüder, sind wir frohgemut" (known as the Altenberg pilgrimage song) and "Wir sind nur Gast auf Erden", which was first called a Reiselied (travel song).

He was interrogated by the Gestapo and included in a Liste der verdächtigen Personen (list of suspicious persons). He therefore wrote under various pseudonyms, such as Thomas Klausner, Stefan Stahl, Richard Waldmann, Simpel Krone, and Schikki. In 1936, Thurmair and Adolf Lohmann published a school songbook for the Rhineland. As it juxtaposed Catholic songs and Nazi songs, it was banned.

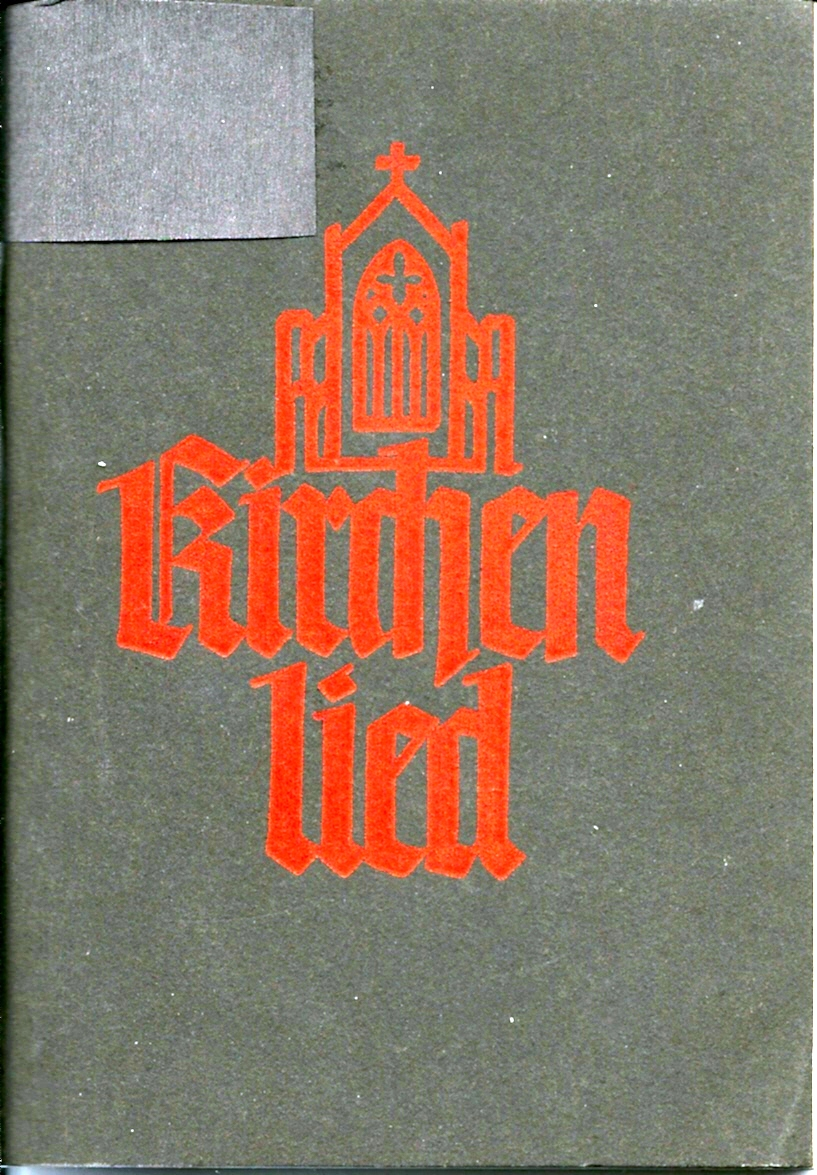
Cover of Kirchenlied, second edition, 1938

Together with Josef Diewald and Lohmann, in 1938 Thurmair published the hymnal Kirchenlied, intended to be a common hymnal for German-speaking Catholics. Called a Standard Songbook, this collection of 140 old and new songs, beginning with the 16th century and including several Protestant songs, as well as ten of Thurmair's songs, was significant for ecumenical church singing in German and became the germ cell for the Gotteslob of 1975, which incorporated 75 of the Kirchenlied songs. This hymnal was not immediately banned, because of its many Protestant songs.

When the Jugendhaus Düsseldorf was closed on 6 February 1939, Thurmair became a freelance writer in Recklinghausen and, a year later, in Munich. He was drafted from 1940 to 1945.

He married Maria Luise Thurmair in 1941, and they worked together. He worked mainly for the Christophorus-Verlag in Freiburg, which belongs to the Catholic Verlag Herder, and as chief editor of several Catholic papers. He died in Munich and was buried in the Munich Waldfriedhof.

== Awards ==
- Knight of the Order of St. Sylvester (1960)

== Works ==
- Das helle Segel (1935)
- Die ersten Gedichte an die Freunde (1938) (Note: Shortly after publication banned by the Nazis, see also Georg Thurmair: Mein Gott, wie schön ist deine Welt. Die ersten Gedichte (1933–1943). Aventinus Verlag Elisabeth Thurmair. Eggenfelden 1979, ISBN 3-88481-001-4, preface.)
- Pfad der Wenigen (1949)
- Hausbuch zur Advents- und Weihnachtszeit (1959)
- Weg und Werk: Die Katholische Kirche in Deutschland (1960)
- Brüder überm Sternenzelt (um 1970)
- Gesicht der Hoffnung (1988)

=== Hymns in Gotteslob ===
Several of Thurmair's hymn were part of the Catholic hymnal Gotteslob of 1975, and are part of the 2013 Gotteslob, including (with the older GL number in brackets):

- 551 (262) Nun singt ein neues Lied dem Herren (1969/1972, after Psalm 98)
- 271 (169) O Herr, aus tiefer Klage (1935)
- 334 (208) O Licht der wunderbaren Nacht (1963)
- 377 (472), 2 O Jesu, all mein Leben bist du (1938)
- 455 (615), 2-4 Alles meinem Gott zu Ehren (1963)
- 489 (637) Laßt uns loben, Brüder, loben (1948), now: Lasst uns loben, freudig loben (2013)
- 487 (638) Nun singe Lob, du Christenheit (1964)
- 500 (660) Nun lässest du, o Herr (1966)
- 505 (656) Wir sind nur Gast auf Erden (1935)

Some hymns appeared only in the first edition of 1975, or were included in regional sections of the later edition, including:

General

- 167 O höre, Herr, erhöre mich (1963)
- 260 Singet Lob unserm Gott (1940/1971), in Limburg 2013 GL 815
- 517 Herr Jesus, öffne unsern Mund (1963)
- 540 Sei gelobt, Herr Jesus Christ (1943)
- 556 Völker aller Land (1964/1971), after Psalm 47, in Limburg 2013 GL 802
- 565 Komm, Herr Jesus, komm zur Erde (1939)
- 590–592 Maria sei gegrüßt (rosary, 1940/1970)

Appendix in dioceses

- Nun, Brüder, sind wir frohgemut (1935) (Note: Aachen (No. 034), Augsburg (No. 972), Bamberg (No. 891), Berlin (No. 926), Erfurt (No. 948), Dresden-Meißen (No. 960), Eichstätt (No. 886), Hamburg (No. 910), Hildesheim (No. 880), Limburg (No. 975), Munich and Freising (No. 856), Münster (Nr. 875), Passau (No. 927), Regensburg (No. 899), Speyer (No. 885), Würzburg (No. 895))
- Wir bitten dich, Herr Jesu Christ (Note: Limburg (No. 960), Trier (No. 917))
- Der Satan löscht die Lichter aus (Note: Mainz (No. 809))
- Mein Gott, wie schön ist deine Welt (Note: Augsburg (No. 831), Limburg (No. 852))

== Documentaries ==
- Pro Mundi Vita (1961)
- Lux mundi (Licht der Welt) (1968)

== Bibliography ==
- Martin Persch (1996). "Thurmair, Georg". In Bautz, Traugott (ed.). Biographisch-Bibliographisches Kirchenlexikon (BBKL) (in German). Vol. 11. Herzberg: Bautz. cols. 1531–1532. ISBN 3-88309-064-6.
- Elisabeth Thurmair: Ein Gast auf Erden: Georg Thurmair. Mahner – Rufer – Rebell. Eggenfelden 1986
