= Altenberg (Bergisches Land) =

Coordinates: 51°3′N 7°08′E

Altenberg (German: [ˈaltn̩bɛʁk]) is an Ortsteil (area) in the municipality of Odenthal in the Rheinisch-Bergischer Kreis of the State of North Rhine-Westphalia, Germany, and was formerly the seat of the Counts of Berg. Over the course of time, they created around their Residence a small dominion, which later came to be called the Bergisches Land.

== History ==
At the beginning of the twelfth century the Counts donated the site of their old ancestral castle, the Burg Berge, to some Cistercian monks from Burgundy, who erected a monastery there but just a short while afterward relocated a few hundred meters further up the valley of the Dhünn. The Counts of Berg resettled at that time to Burg Castle on the Wupper.

== Altenberger Dom ==
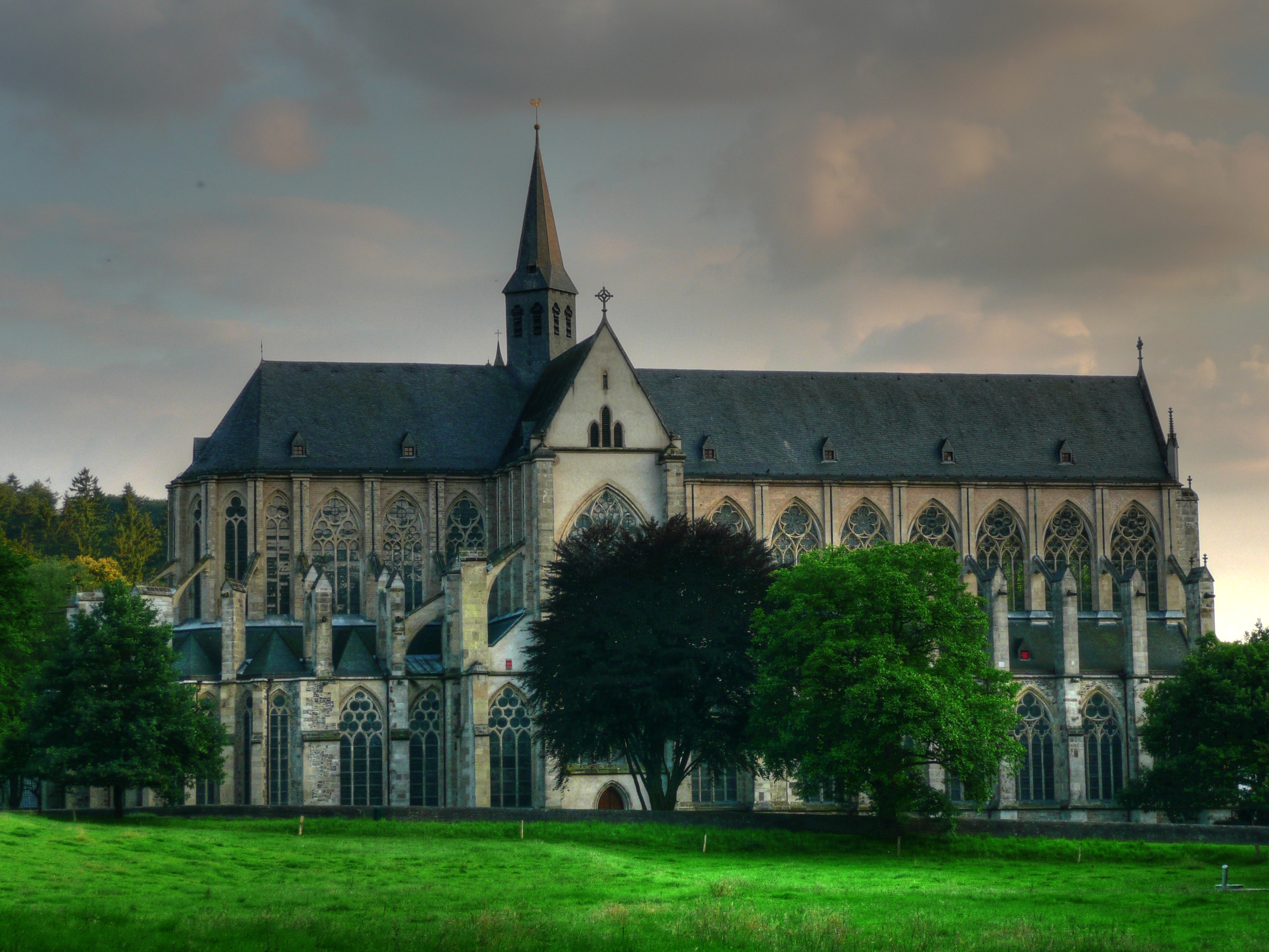
Altenberger Dom

The most imposing building in Altenberg today is the high-Gothic Altenberger Dom, begun in 1259. From the 19th century, the Altenberger Dom has been a Simultankirche, which means it is used for services by both Protestants and Catholics. Concerts also regularly take place there. The church is owned by the State of North Rhine-Westphalia, which also financed the recent extensive restoration work, completed on 30 June 2005. On 25 August 2006 an ecumenical worship service and state ceremony took place, to mark the end of the twelve-year-long restoration, in the presence of Joachim Meisner and the minister-president of North Rhine–Westphalia, Jürgen Rüttgers.

Adjacent is Haus Altenberg, which was for decades the centre of the Catholic Youth Movement, and serves now education and meetings of young people.

== Märchenwald ==
There is also the so-called Märchenwald (Fairy-tale Forest), in which many German fairy tales are represented as tableaus in huts and figures.
