= Rheinisch-Bergischer Kreis =

Coordinates: 51°01′N 7°12′E

- District
- Flag Coat of arms
- Country: Germany
- State: North Rhine-Westphalia
- Adm. region: Cologne
- Capital: Bergisch Gladbach

Government
  - District admin.: Stephan Santelmann (CDU)

Area
  - Total: 437.64 km^{2} (168.97 sq mi)

Population (31 December 2024)
  - Total: 284,273
  - Density: 649.56/km^{2} (1,682.4/sq mi)
- Time zone: UTC+01:00 (CET)
  - Summer (DST): UTC+02:00 (CEST)
- Vehicle registration: GL
- Website: www.rbk-online.de

The Rheinisch-Bergischer Kreis (German pronunciation: [ˈʁaɪnɪʃ ˈbɛʁɡɪʃɐ ˈkʁaɪs], lit. 'Rhine-Berg district') is a Kreis (district) in the Cologne Bonn Region of North Rhine-Westphalia, Germany. Neighboring districts are Kreis Mettman, Oberbergischer Kreis and Rhein-Sieg, and the district-free cities Cologne, Leverkusen, Solingen and Remscheid.

== History ==
The area of the Bergisches Land belonged to the earldom of Berg for most of medieval times, which gives the district its name.

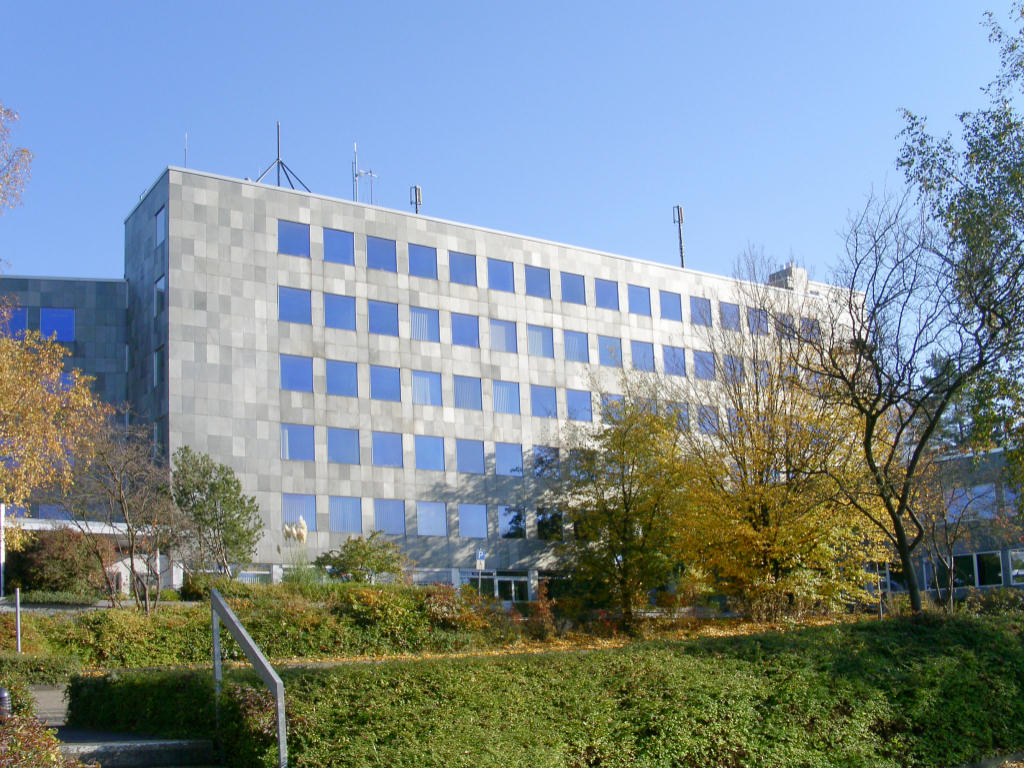
Bergisch Gladbach Kreishaus

In 1816, after the whole Rhineland area was given to Prussia, the districts of Wipperfürth, Mülheim, Lennep, Opladen and Solingen were created in the area now covered by the district. In 1819, Opladen and Solingen were merged into the new Solingen district. In 1929, a new Rhein-Wupper district was created, and several municipalities were incorporated into the cities of Wuppertal, Remscheid and Solingen. In 1932, the districts Mülheim and Wipperfürth were merged to form the old Rheinisch-Bergische Kreis. Finally, in 1975, most of the area of the districts if Rhein-Wupper and Rheinisch-Bergisch was merged to form the current district.

== Geography ==
The district form the western part of the Bergisches Land, where the hills of the Sauerland descend into the Rhine valley.

== Coat of arms ==
The top part of the coat of arms show the geographical location of the district near the rhine valley - the silver band symbolized the Rhine river. This symbol comes from the coat of arms of the former prussian province Rhineland. In the left side the double bars are thought to symbolize a castle, they were used by the earls of Berg around 1100. When in 1225 the dukes of Limburg did take over they introduce their sign, the red lion with a blue tongue, into the coat of arms of the earldom.

== Cities and municipalities ==
Clickable map of towns and municipalities in the district

Cities
Municipalities
1. Bergisch Gladbach
2. Burscheid
3. Leichlingen
4. Overath
5. Rösrath
6. Wermelskirchen
1. Kürten
2. Odenthal
