= Albert Curtz =

German astronomer

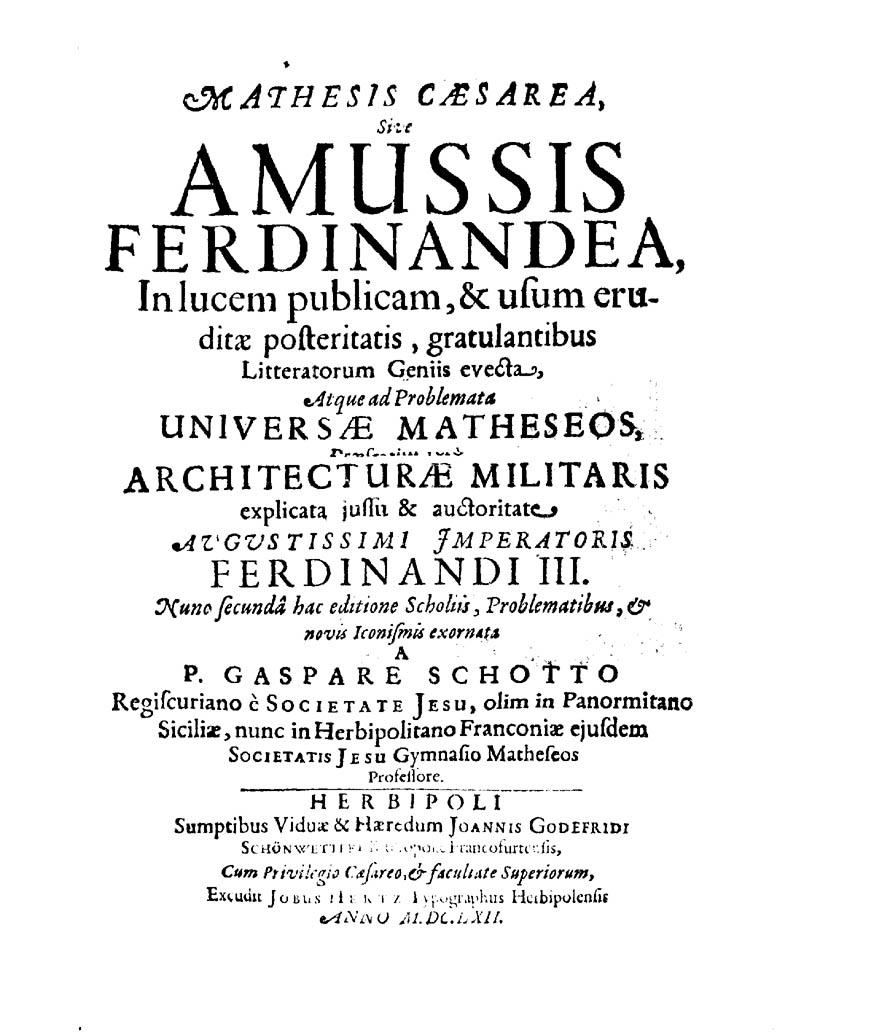
Amussis Ferdinandea, 1662

Albert Curtz (Curtius in Latin; 1600, Munich – December 19, 1671, Munich), was a German astronomer and member of the Society of Foolish . He expanded on the works of Tycho Brahe and used the pseudonym of Lucius Barrettus.

== Background ==
The Latin version of the name Albert Curtz, Albertus Curtius is an anagram of his pseudonym, Lucius Barretus.

Together with Johann Deckers, Kepler, Francesco Maria Grimaldi, and Jean-Baptiste Riccioli, he contributed to our early understanding of the Moon.

He published Historia coelestis [ex libris commentariis manuscriptis observationum vicennalium viri generosi Tichonis Brahe] and Augustae Vindelicorum, Simonem Utzschneiderum in 1666.

He published his literary works, including his psalm translation Die Harpffen Davids Mit Teutschen Saiten bespannet (Augsburg, 1659), in German, using the Upper German written language that was common in southern Germany, Austria and Switzerland. In doing so, he consciously opposed the East Central German writing language, which was already more prestigious in his time, as propagated by Martin Opitz, for example, and also justifies this decision in his work.

The crater Curtius on the Moon was named after him.

== See also ==
- List of Jesuit scientists
- List of Roman Catholic scientist-clerics
