= Odenthal =

- Municipality
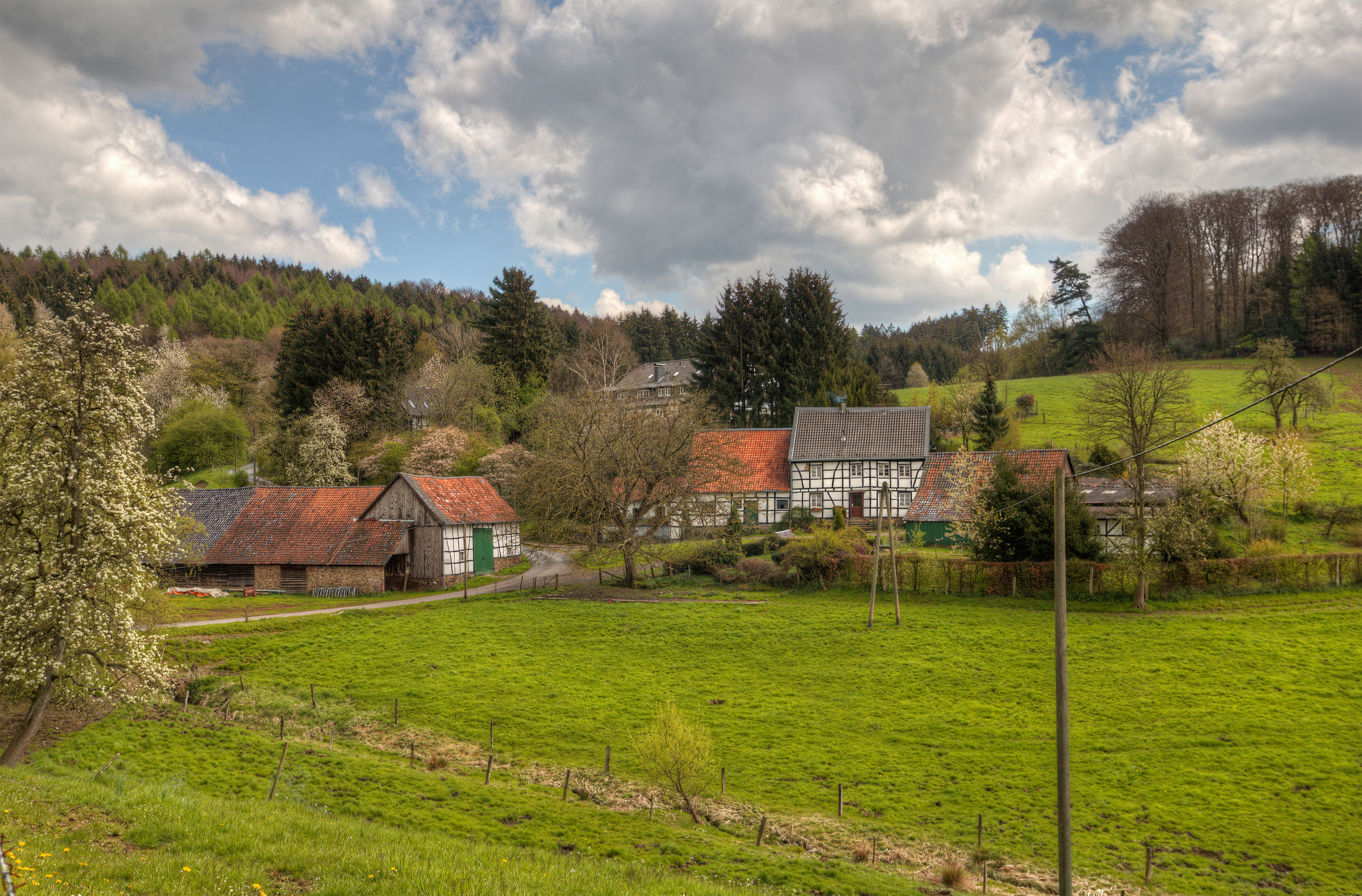
- View of Odenthal-Selbach

- Flag Coat of arms

- Location of Odenthal within Rheinisch-Bergischer Kreis district
- Interactive map of Odenthal
- Location within Germany Location within North Rhine-Westphalia
- Coordinates: 51°2′N 7°7′E
- Country: Germany
- State: North Rhine-Westphalia
- Admin. region: Köln
- District: Rheinisch-Bergischer Kreis
- Subdivisions: 32

Government
  - Mayor (2020–25): Robert Lennerts (Ind.)

Area
  - Total: 39.87 km^{2} (15.39 sq mi)
- Elevation: 149 m (489 ft)

Population (2025-12-31)
  - Total: 15,728
  - Density: 394.5/km^{2} (1,022/sq mi)
- Time zone: UTC+01:00 (CET)
  - Summer (DST): UTC+02:00 (CEST)
- Postal codes: 51519
- Dialling codes: 02202, 02207, 02174
- Vehicle registration: GL
- Website: www.odenthal.de

Odenthal (German pronunciation: [ˈoːdn̩taːl]) is a municipality in the Rheinisch-Bergischer Kreis, in North Rhine-Westphalia, Germany.

== Geography ==
Odenthal is situated approximately 5 km north of Bergisch Gladbach and 15 km north-east of Cologne.

=== Neighbouring places ===
Nearby cities are Leverkusen, Burscheid, Wermelskirchen, and Bergisch Gladbach. Neighboring municipalities include Kürten.

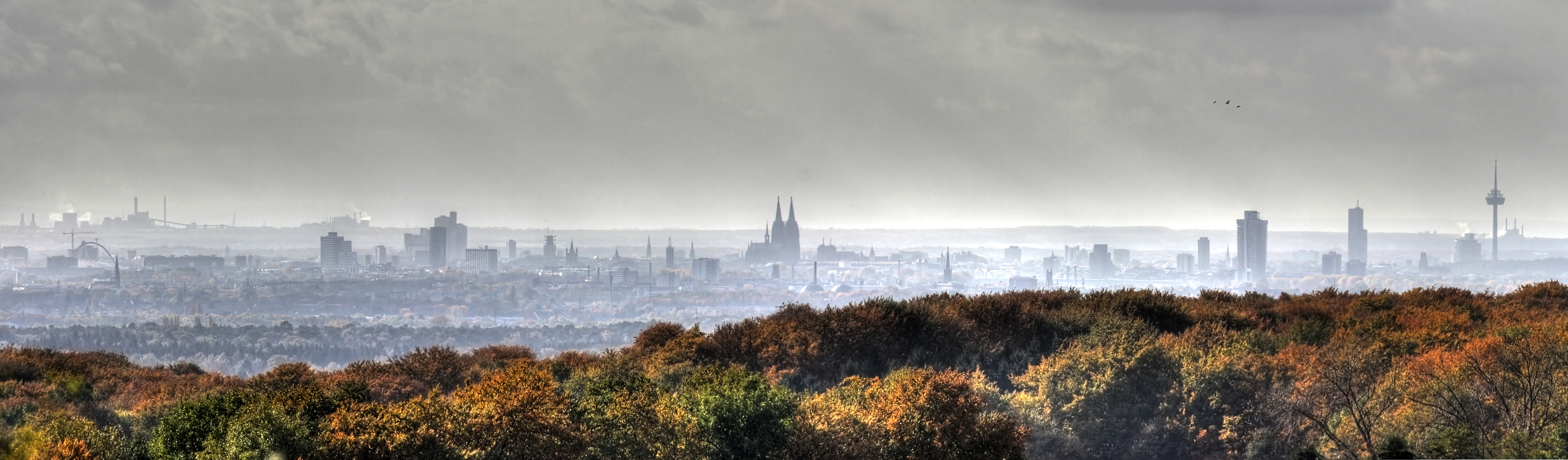
Panoramic view of Cologne on a rainy day as seen from Voiswinkel

=== Division of the town ===
The municipality includes 32 districts (Ortsteile):

Altehufe - Altenberg - Blecher - Busch - Bülsberg - Bömberg - Bömerich - Eikamp - Erberich - Feld - Glöbusch - Grimberg - Großgrimberg - Hahnenberg - Holz - Höffe - Hüttchen - Klasmühle - Küchenberg - Kümps - Landwehr - Menrath - Neschen - Oberscheid - Osenau - Pistershausen - Schallemich - Scheuren - Schmeisig - Schwarzbroich - Selbach - Voiswinkel.

== Population ==
Historical population

Year	Pop.	±% p.a.
1965	8,223	—
1970	9,957	+3.90%
1975	11,926	+3.67%
1980	12,299	+0.62%
1985	12,871	+0.91%
1990	13,218	+0.53%
1995	13,909	+1.02%

Year	Pop.	±% p.a.
2000	14,829	+1.29%
2005	15,781	+1.25%
2010	15,766	−0.02%
2015	15,123	−0.83%
2020	15,031	−0.12%
2025	15,728	+0.91%

Source: Landesdatabank Nordrhein-Westfalen

== Sightseeing attractions ==
The Altenberger Dom is a large 13th century abbey church near the village Altenberg, part of Odenthal.

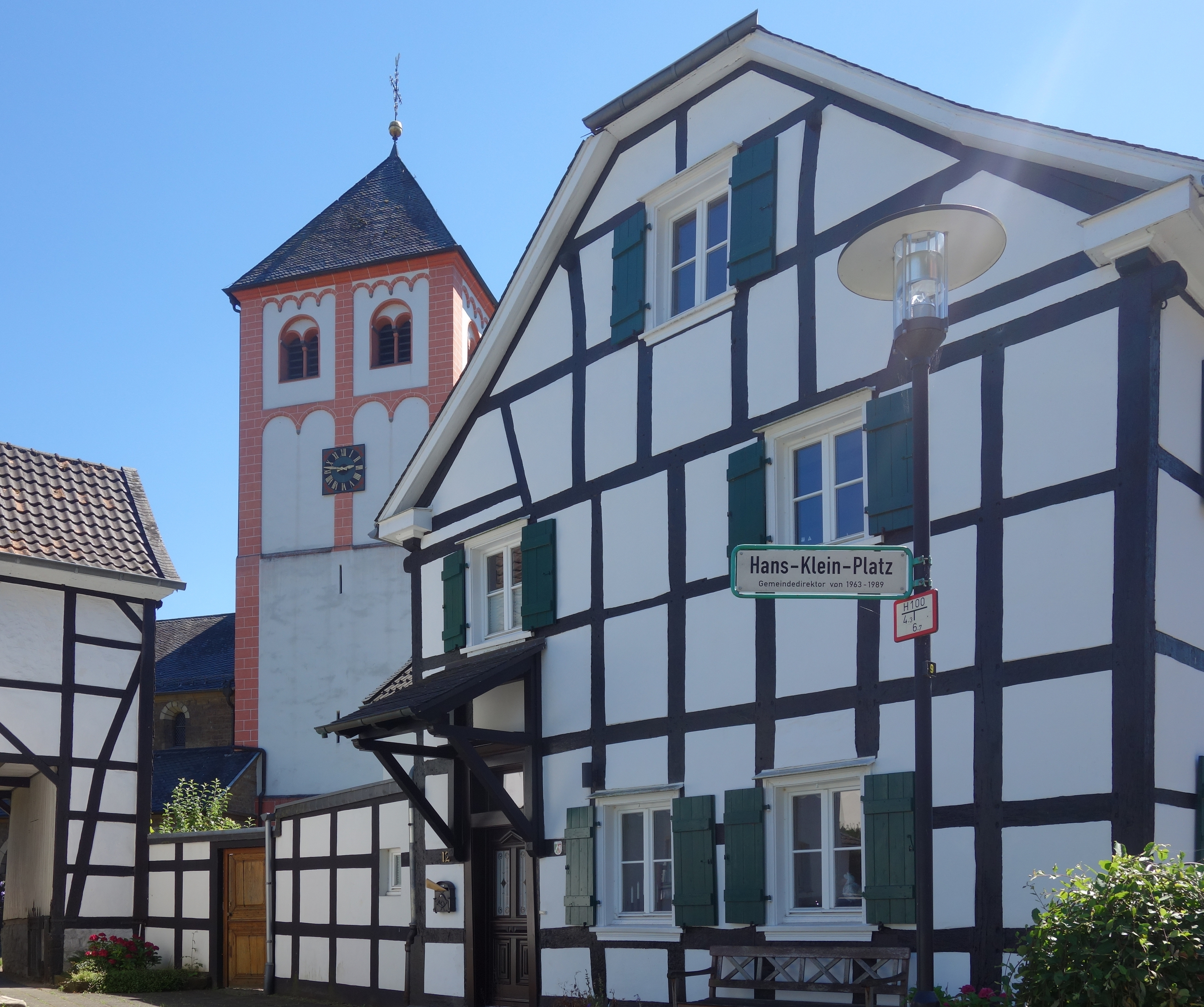
Hans-Klein-Platz

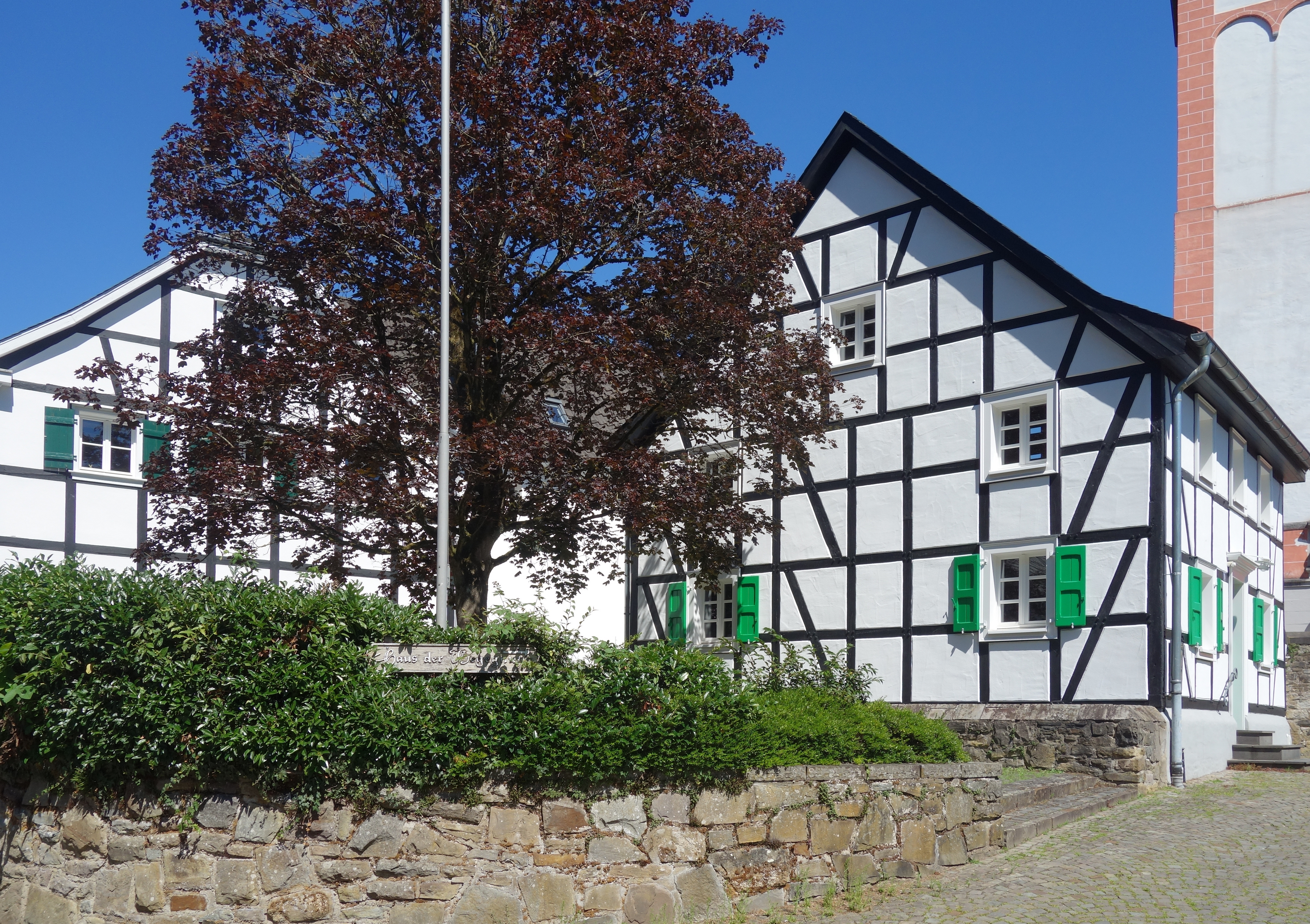
Half-timbering

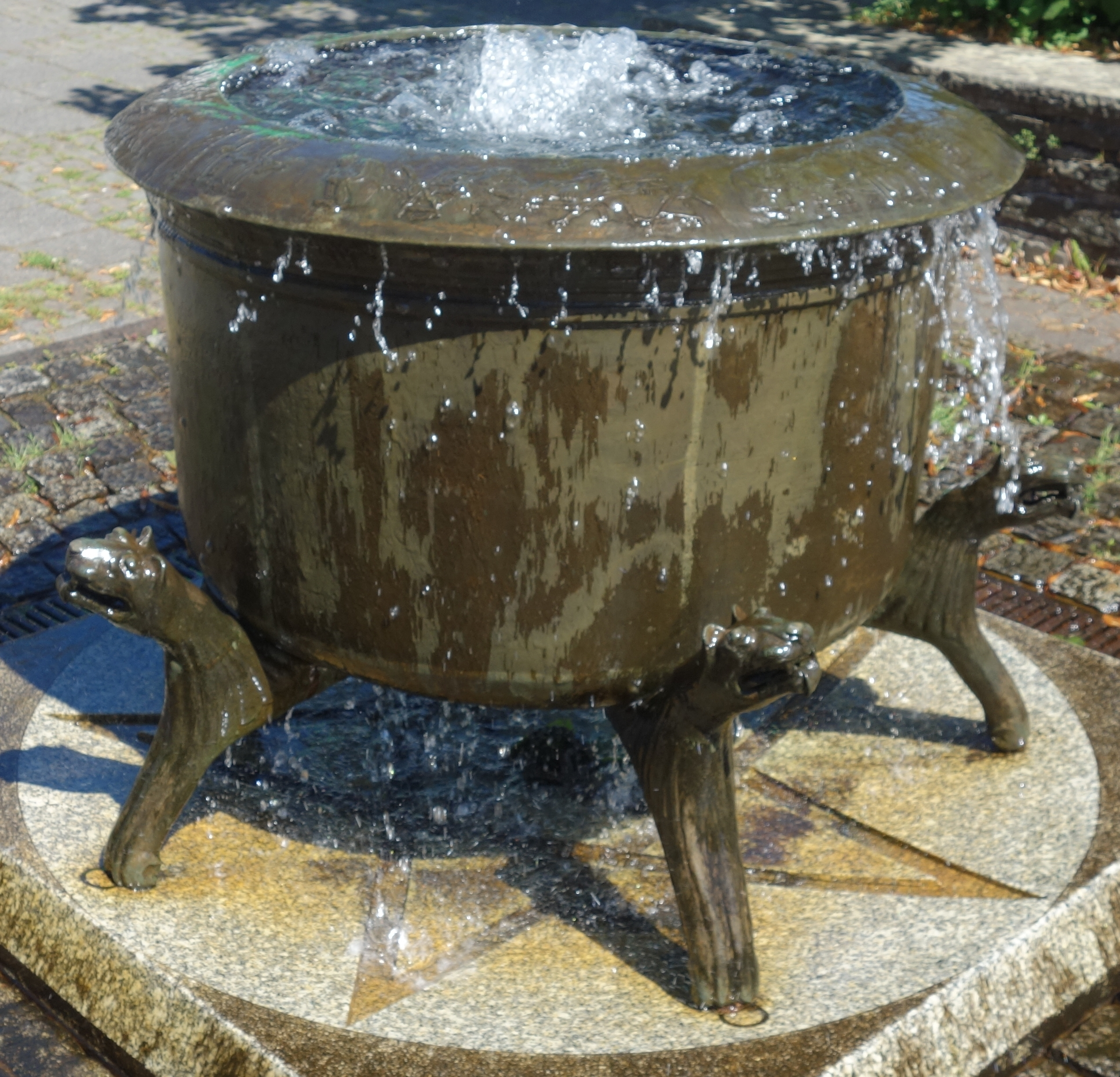
Hexenbrunnen

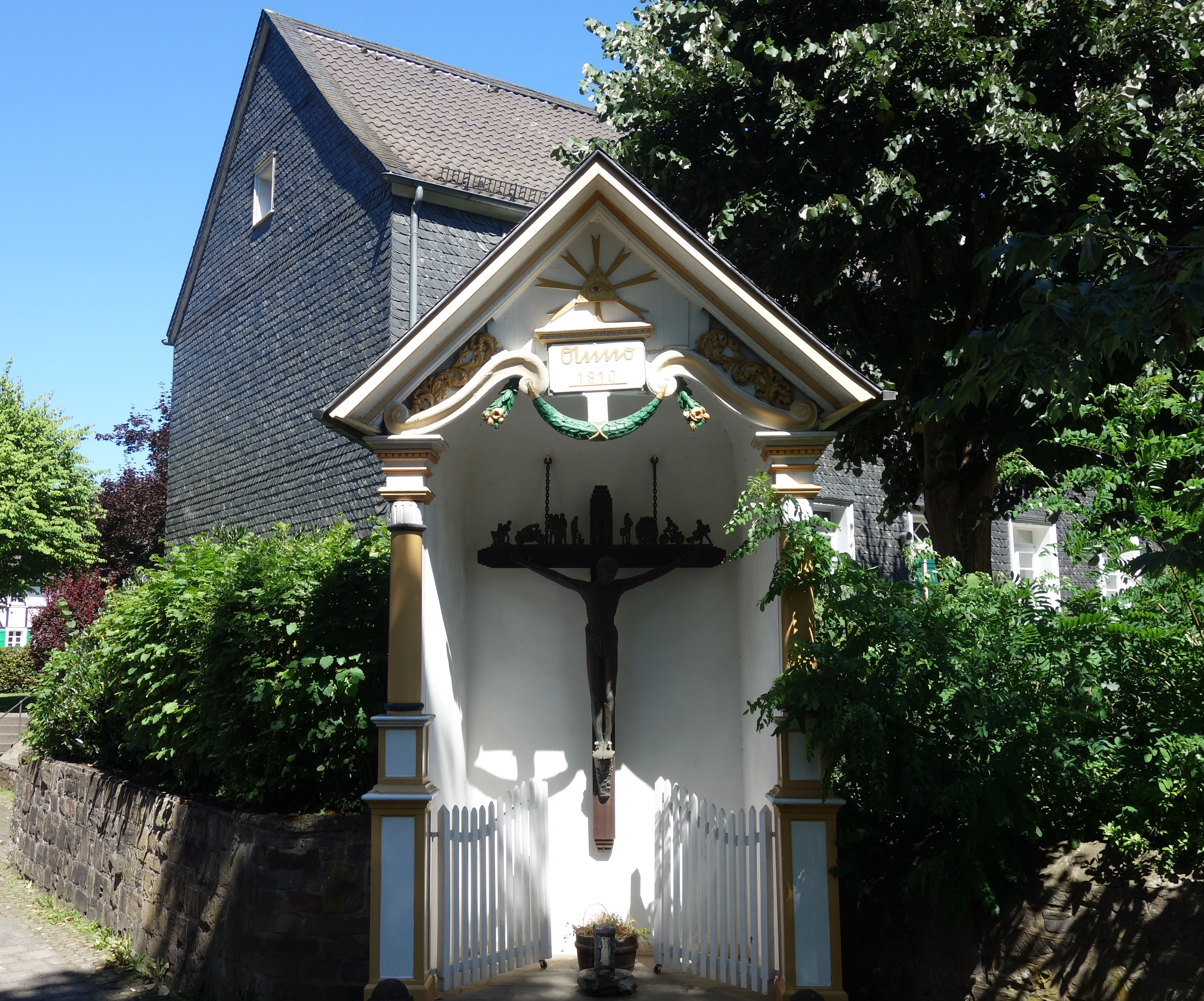
Heiligenhäuschen

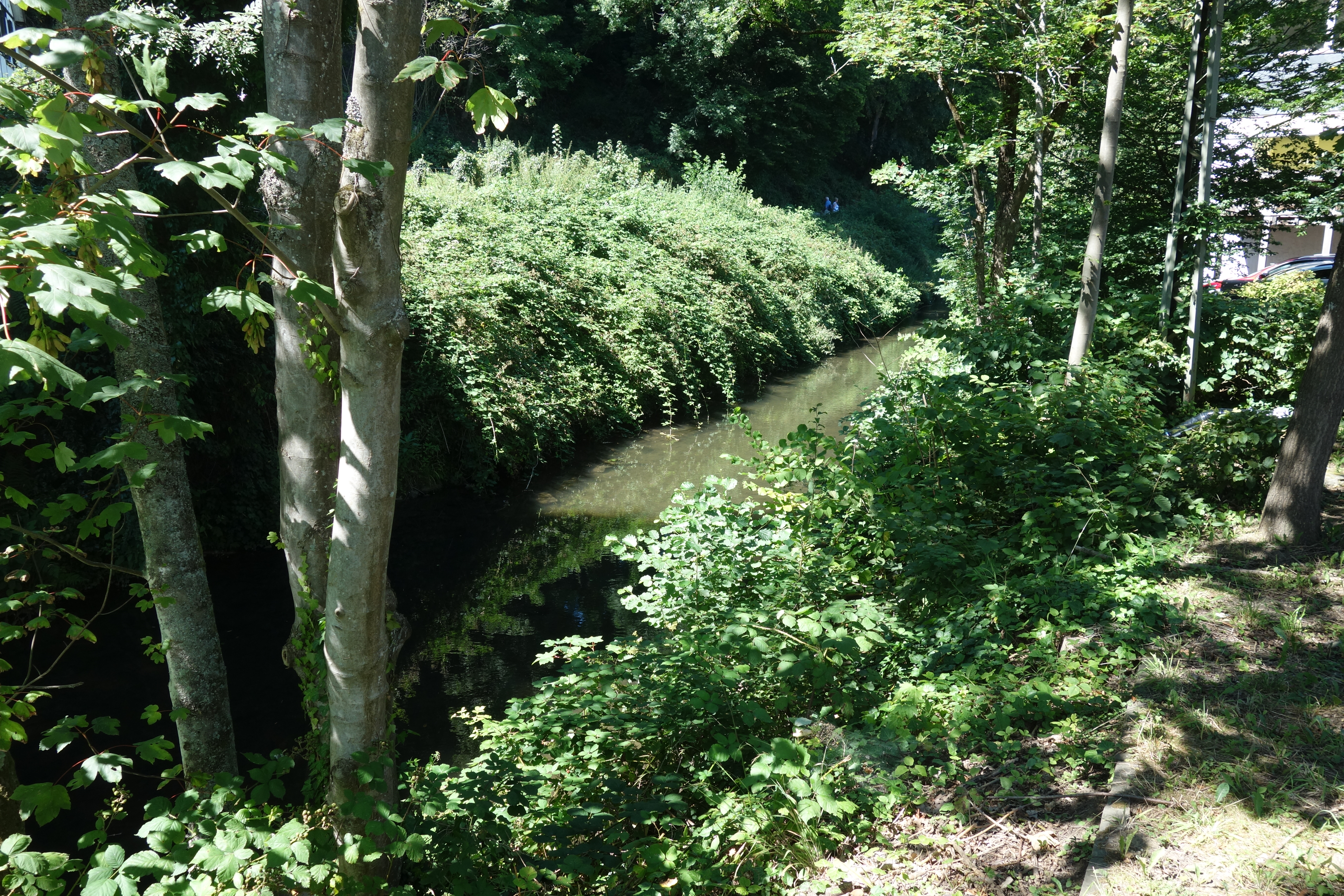
Dhünn

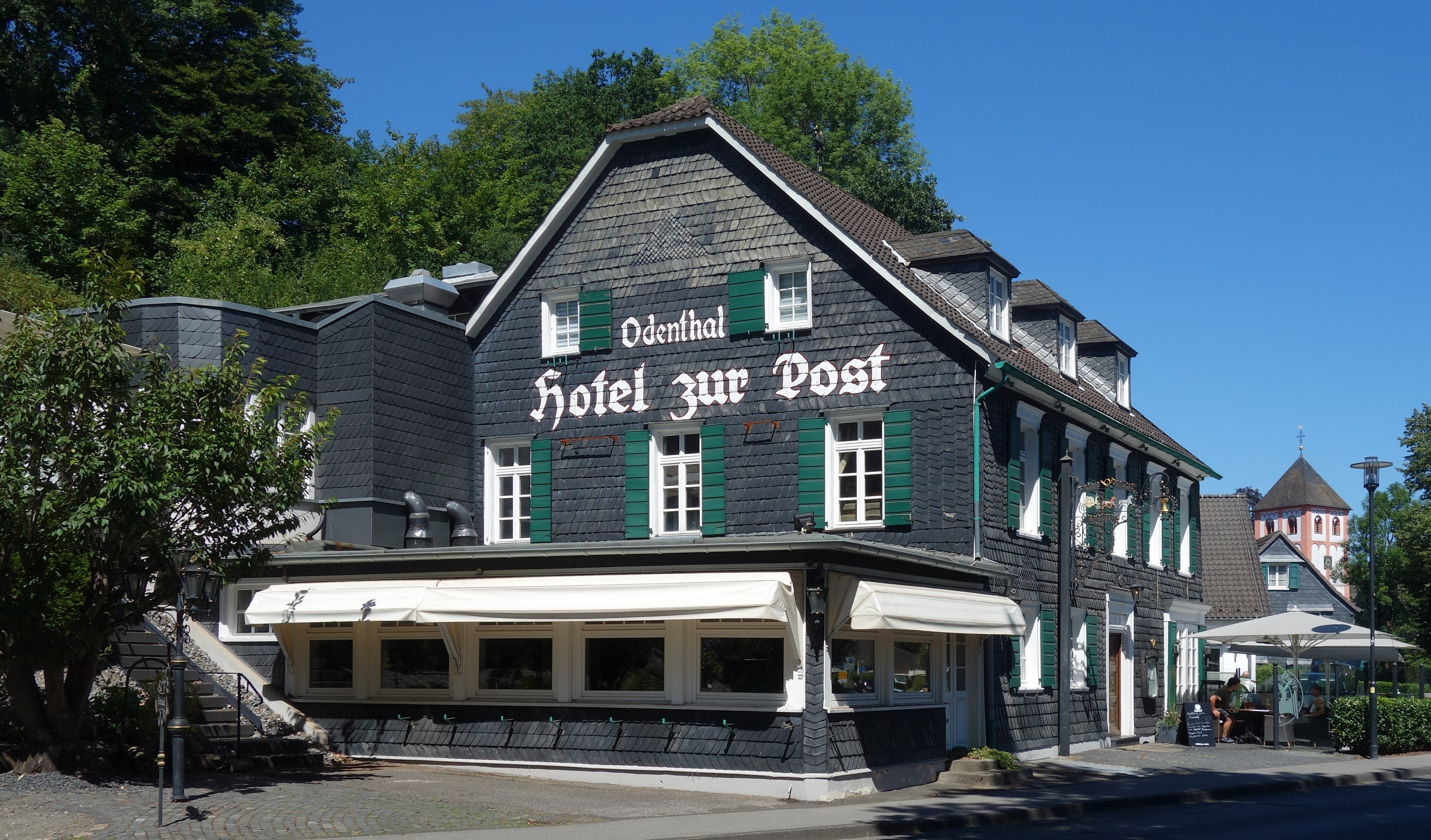
Hotel zur Post

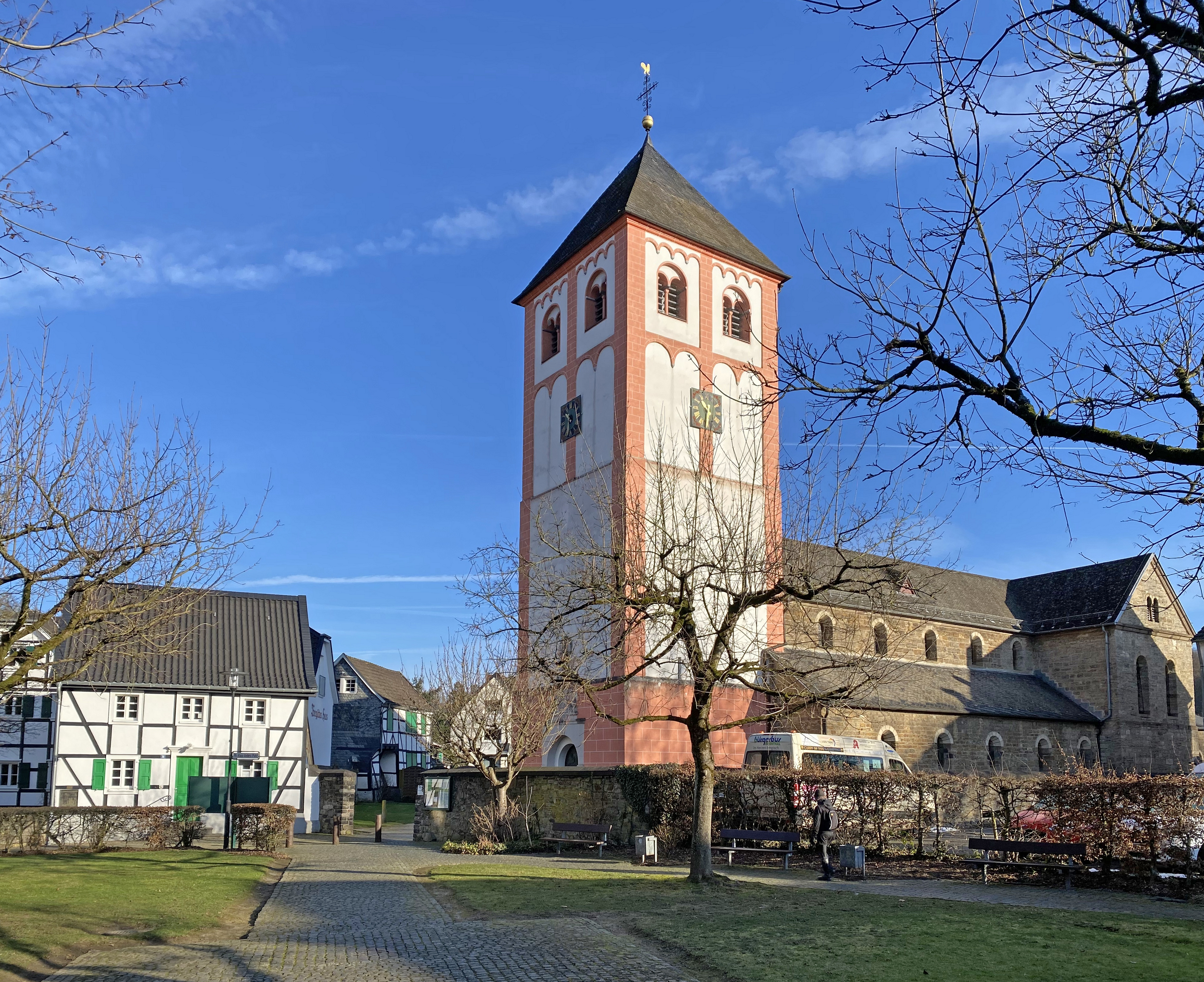
Medieval church St. Pankratius

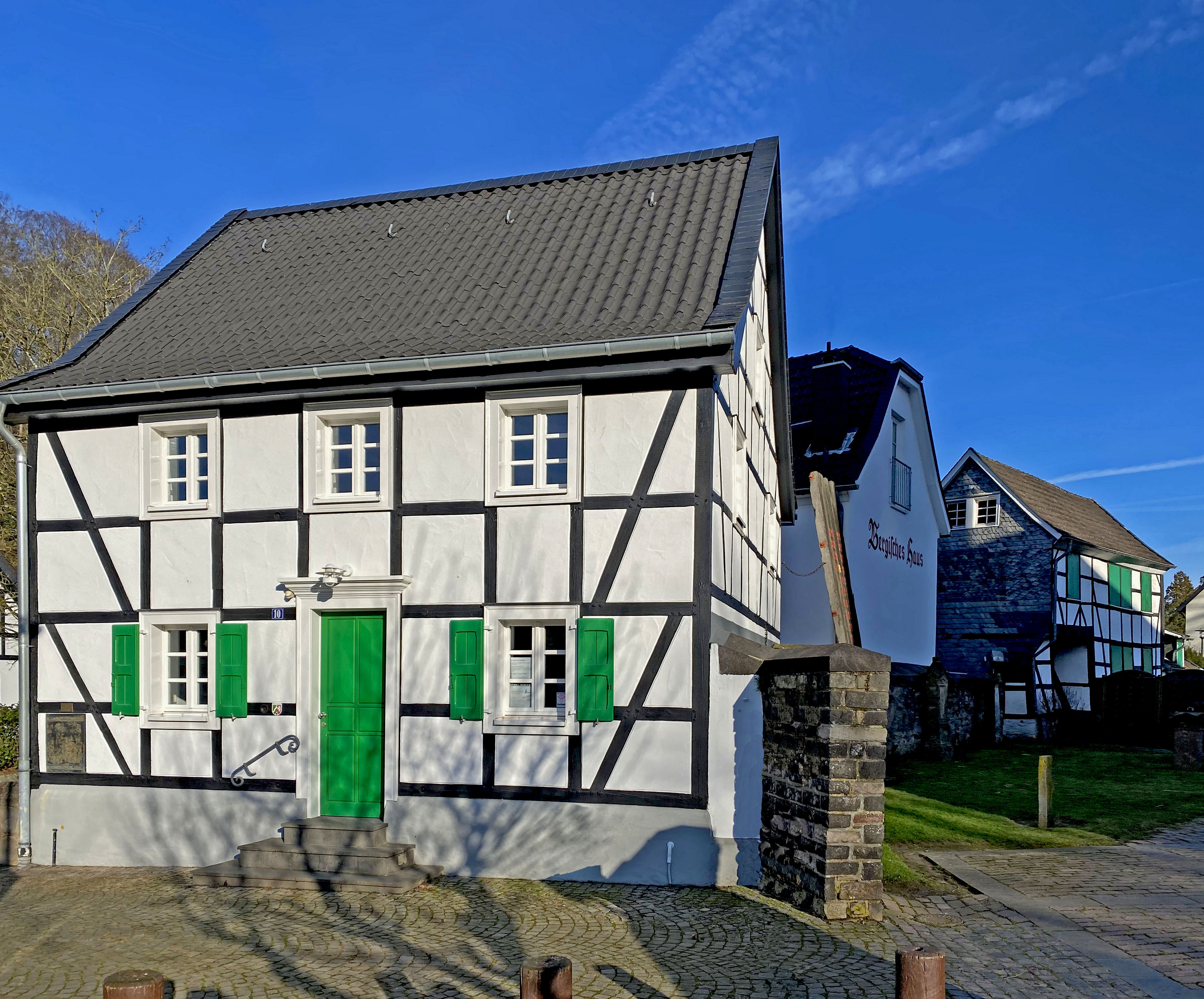
Village Street

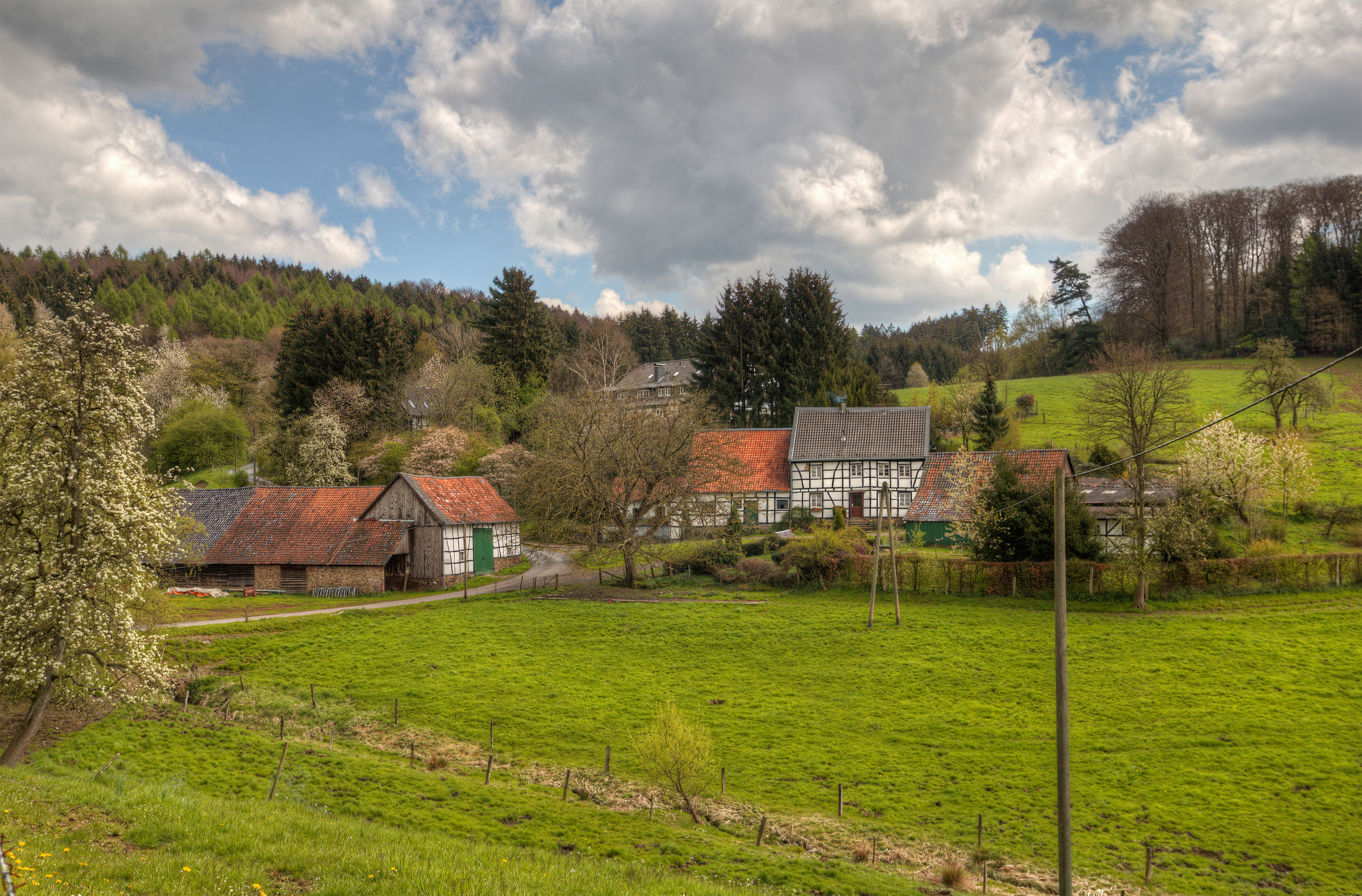
Selbach

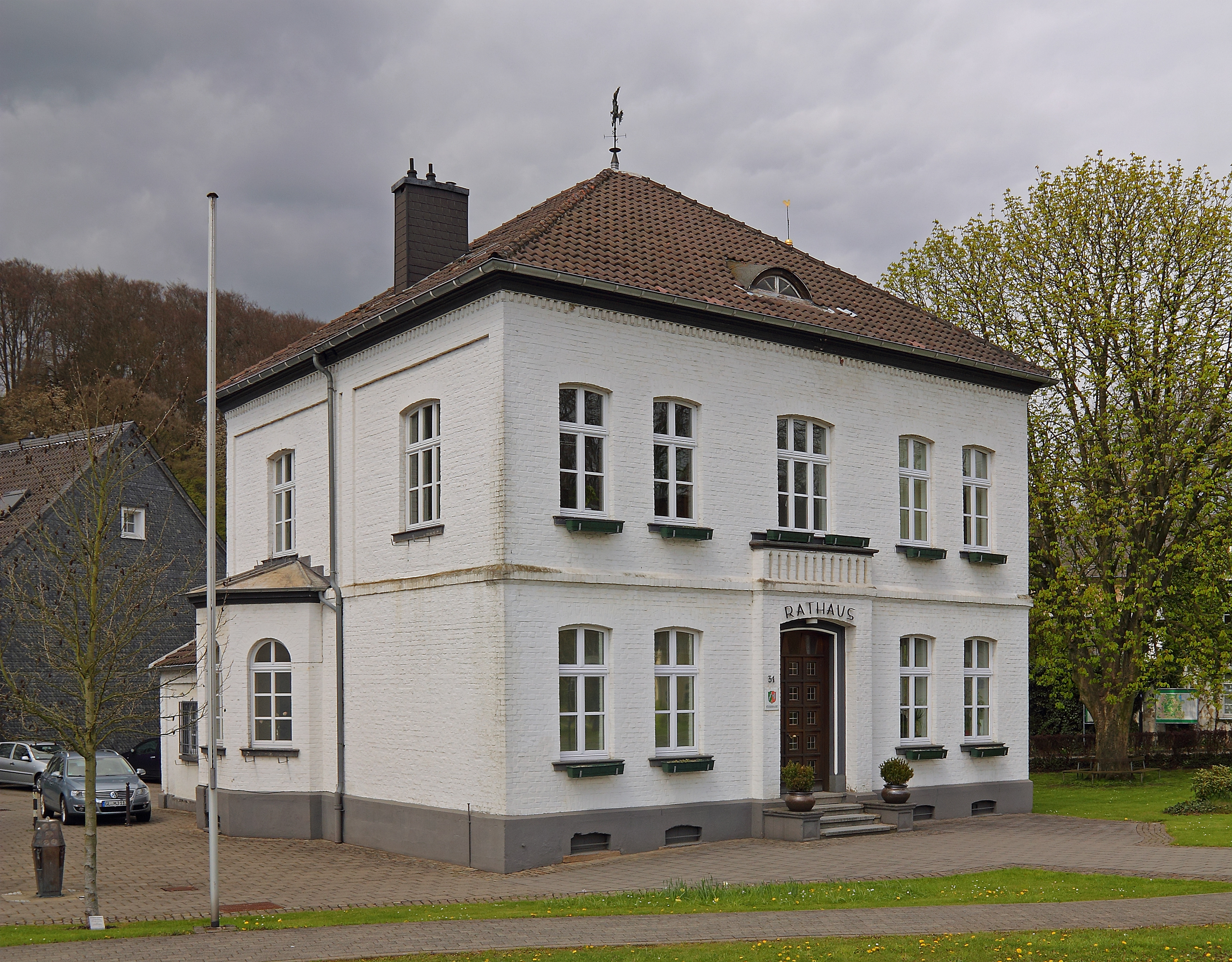
Community Center

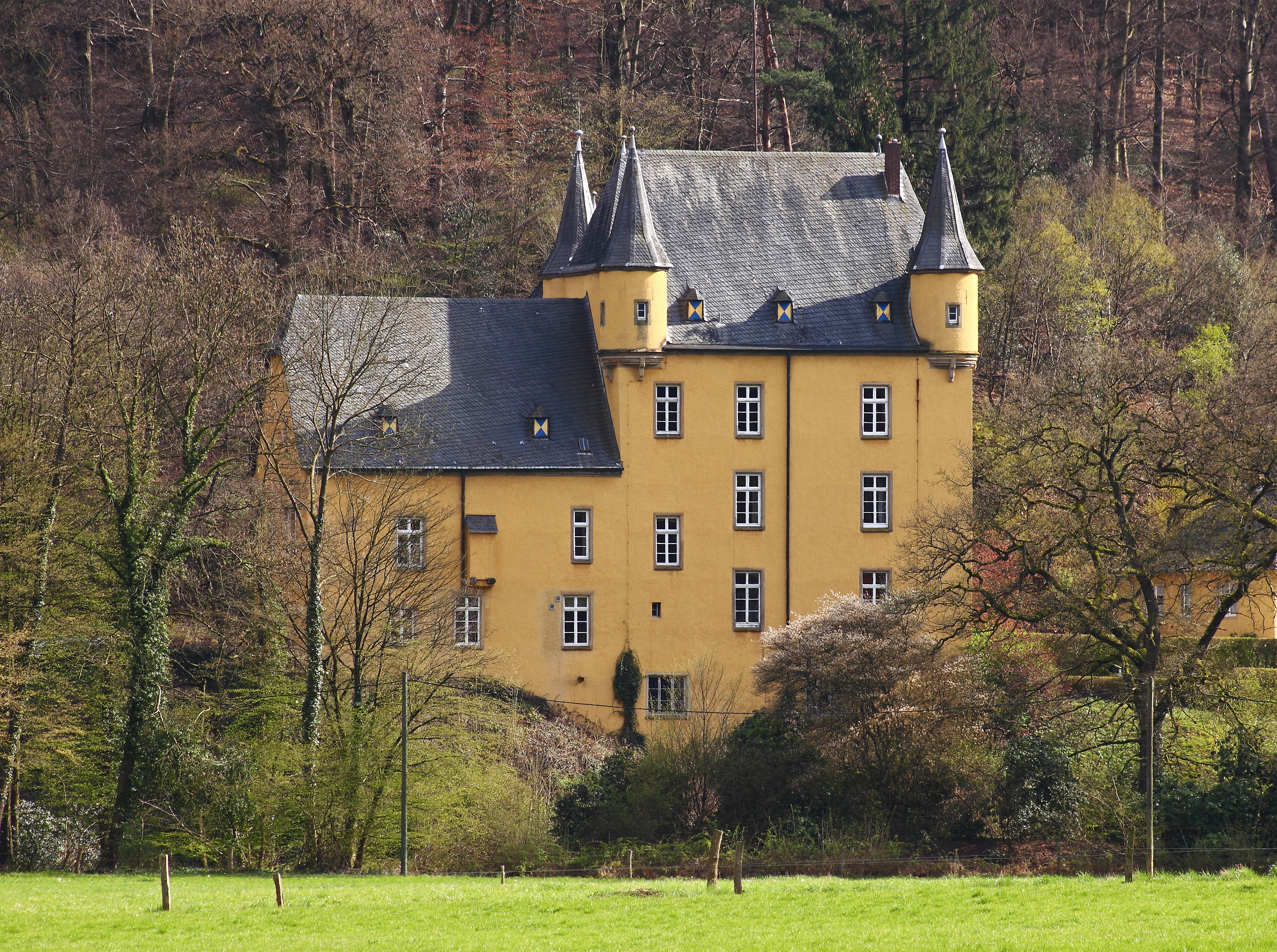
Strauweiler Castle

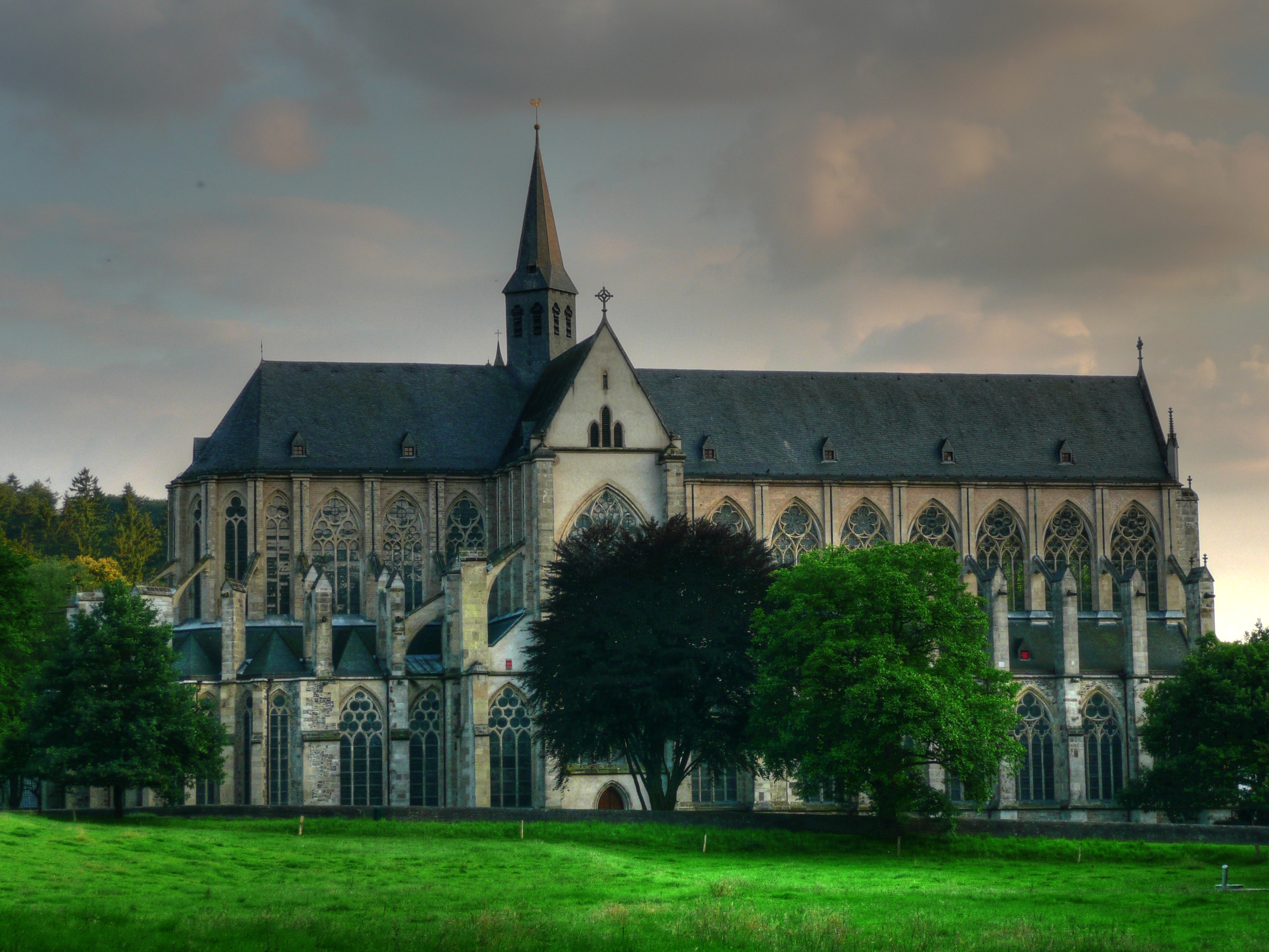
Altenberger Dom

== Twin towns ==
- Cernay la Ville (France), since 1996
- Paimio (Finland), since 2011
