= Dhünn =

River in Germany

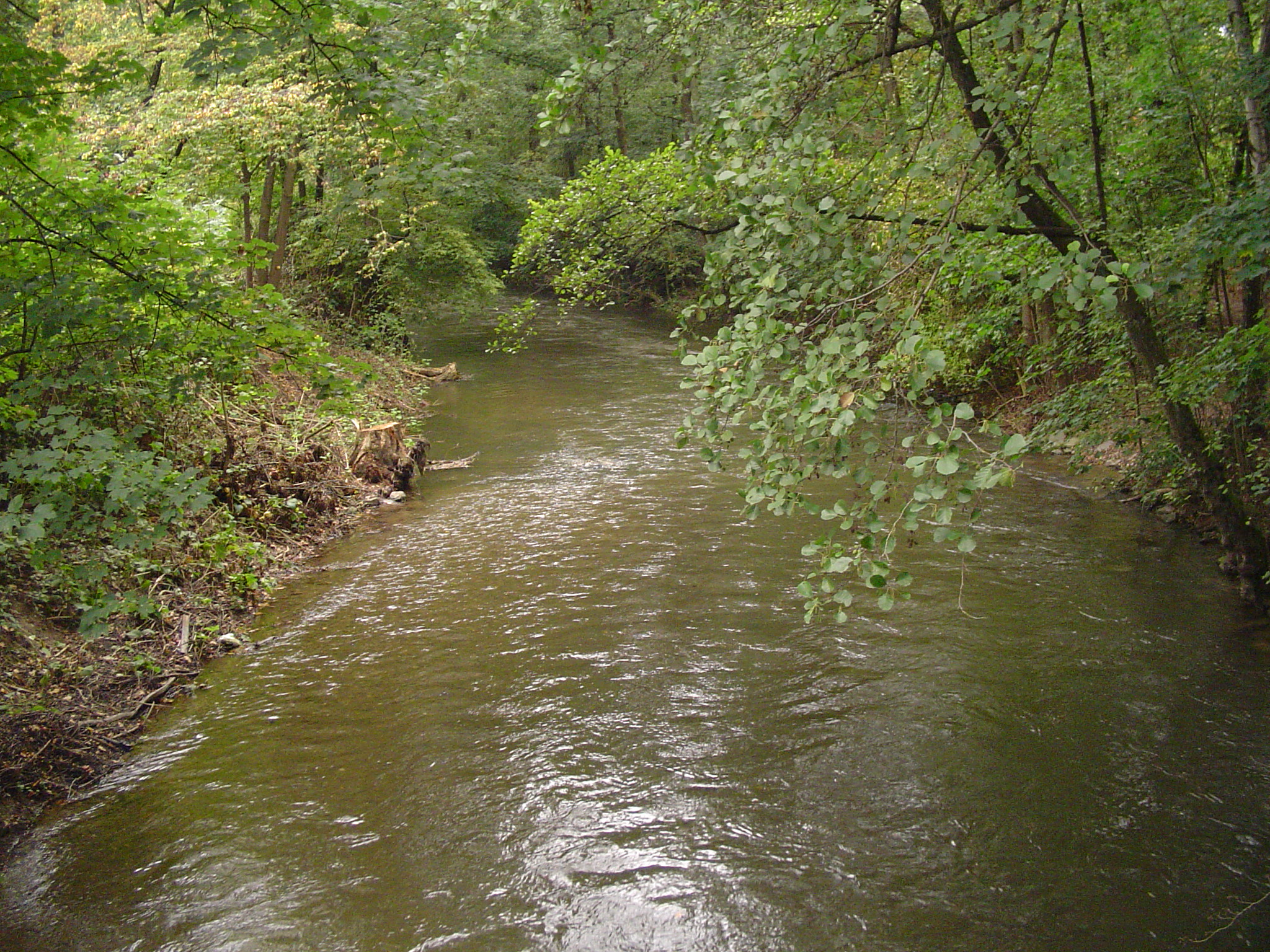

Location
- Country: Germany
- State: North Rhine-Westphalia

Physical characteristics
- Source
  - location: Near Wipperfürth
- Mouth
  - location: Near Leverkusen into the Wupper
  - coordinates: 51.0496°N 6.9626°E
- Length: 40.0 km (24.9 mi)
- Basin size: 198 km^{2} (76 sq mi)

Basin features
- Progression: Wupper→ Rhine→ North Sea

Dhünn is a 40 km (25 mi)-long river located in North Rhine-Westphalia, Germany. Its main source is near Wipperfürth in the Bergisches Land area. It runs in a south-westerly direction, and its mouth into the river Wupper is near Leverkusen, appr. 10 km (6.2 mi) north of Cologne.

== Renaturation ==
By diverting the river bed of the Dhünn around the 'Sensenhammer' weir in April 2010, it was declared the first 'barrier-free river' in North Rhine-Westphalia. This means that the 24 km (15 mi)-long stretch of the river from the mouth into the Wupper to the 'Großen Dhünn' dam is accessible without obstacles for fish and microbes. Fish can now migrate again freely to their spawning grounds.

== Sights along the river ==
- Altenberg Abbey
- Berge castle (German: Burg Berge)
- Strauweiler castle (German: Schloss Strauweiler)
- Morsbroich castle (German: Schloss Morsbroich)
- Freudenthaler Sensenhammer museum (German: Museum Freudenthaler Sensenhammer)

== See also ==
- List of rivers of North Rhine-Westphalia
