= Sollt ich meinem Gott nicht singen? =

1653 hymn by Paul Gerhardt

- Lutheran hymn
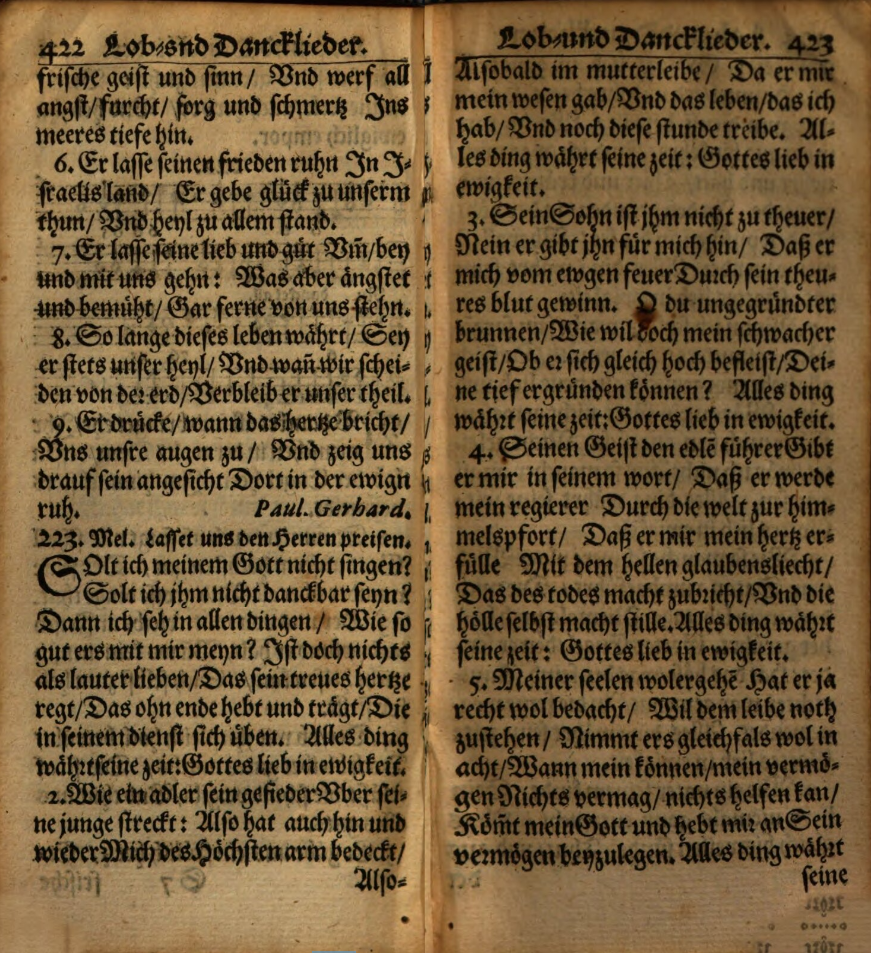
- Excerpt from Praxis pietatis melica, stanzas 1–5 from 12
- English: Should I not sing to my God?
- Text: Paul Gerhardt
- Language: German
- Melody: Johann Schop
- Published: 1653 in Praxis pietatis melica

"Sollt ich meinem Gott nicht singen?" (Should I not sing to my God?) is a sacred song in 12 stanzas by Paul Gerhardt, first published in 1653 to a 1641 melody by Johann Schop in Johann Crüger's hymnal Praxis pietatis melica. It is still part of Protestant hymnals and of songbooks. Catherine Winkworth and others created versions in English.

== History ==
Paul Gerhardt wrote the text of "Sollt ich meinem Gott nicht singen?". It was first published in 1653 in Johann Crüger's hymnal Praxis pietatis melica. The song became part of Protestant hymnals.

The text had originally 12 stanzas of ten lines each. The rhyme scheme combines three different forms, A–B–A–B—C–D–D–C—E–E. The last two lines are the same for all stanzas except the last one. The topic of the song is trust in the grace and love of God, concluding the stanzas with Alles Ding währt seine Zeit / Gottes Lieb in Ewigkeit (Everything lasts its time / God's love into eternity). The final stanza, talking about the vision of eternity, concludes bis ich dich nach dieser Zeit / lob und lieb in Ewigkeit (until I, after this time / praise and love you eternally).

=== Translation ===
The song was translated into English several times, including versions by Charles Wesley and Catherine Winkworth, "Shall I not sing praise to Thee". Lindolfo Weingärtner translated six stanzas into Portuguese; there are also translations into Norwegian, "Skulde jeg min Gud ei prise", and Polish, "Czyżbym nie miał ṡpiewać Bogu".

== Melody ==
The first publication in 1653 used a Dorian melody by Johann Schop that he had used in 1641 for a text by Johann Rist. This version is used as no. 325 in the Evangelisches Gesangbuch. A melody in a major scale by Albrecht Peter Bertsch was published in 1825 and is used as no. 724 in the Swiss hymnal Gesangbuch der Evangelisch-reformierten Kirchen der deutschsprachigen Schweiz.

Johann Sebastian Bach wrote a four-part chorale harmonisation, BWV 413.
