= Wie soll ich dich empfangen =

17th-century German Advent hymn

- Advent hymn
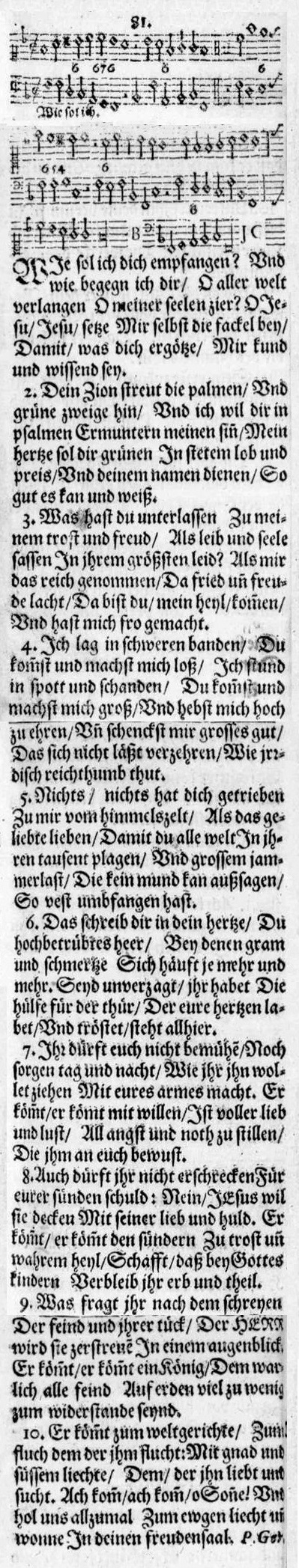
- Melody and text in the first print in Praxis pietatis melica
- English: "Ah! Lord, how shall I meet Thee"
- Text: by Paul Gerhardt
- Language: German
- Melody: by Johann Crüger
- Published: 1653

"Wie soll ich dich empfangen" ("Ah! Lord, how shall I meet Thee", literally: How shall I receive you) is a Christian hymn for Advent by Paul Gerhardt. It was first published in 1653 in the fifth edition of the hymnal Praxis pietatis melica by Johann Crüger, who also created a melody. Johann Sebastian Bach used it as a chorale in his Christmas Oratorio, but with a different melody. Catherine Winkworth translated five of its ten stanzas.

== History ==
Paul Gerhardt wrote the lyrics in the first person, beginning with the theme, the question how to receive Jesus who is expected to arrive. The poet alludes to biblical narrations, such as his entry into Jerusalem and the parable of the ten virgins. The lyricist was also inspired by prophetic words from the Old Testament.

The hymn appeared first in the fifth edition of the hymnal Praxis pietatis melica by Johann Crüger in 1653.

== Text ==
The song is structured in ten stanzas of eight lines each, in bar form. The singer, speaking in the first person, addresses Jesus, establishing a relationship. The first question is "How shall I receive you?". The first five stanzas, using the verbs "empfangen" (receive) and "umfangen" (surround") expand God's love for humans. The image of a "Fackel" (torch) in the first stanza relates to the parable of the ten virgins, (Matthew 25:1–15) the image of palm branches offered for the reception is reminiscent of the entry into Jerusalem (Matthew 21:1–9).

The later five stanzas describe the condition of the congregation as stressful and threatened by enemies, pointing out especially fear of a day of wrath which is expected in a near future (stanza 6: "steht vor der Tür" (stands at the door, as in Revelation 3:20). The term Advent (arrival) appears in four meanings in the following stanzas: in mercy, as redeemer, as king, and as judge.

Catherine Winkworth translated six of its ten stanzas freely, beginning "Ah! Lord, how shall I meet Thee".

German current lyrics

1. Wie soll ich dich empfangen
und wie begegn ich dir,
o aller Welt Verlangen,
o meiner Seelen Zier?
O Jesu, Jesu, setze
mir selbst die Fackel bei,
damit, was dich ergötze,
mir kund und wissend sei.

2. Dein Zion streut dir Palmen
und grüne Zweige hin,
und ich will dir in Psalmen
ermuntern meinen Sinn.
Mein Herze soll dir grünen
in stetem Lob und Preis
und deinem Namen dienen,
so gut es kann und weiß.

3. Was hast du unterlassen
zu meinem Trost und Freud,
als Leib und Seele saßen
in ihrem größten Leid?
Als mir das Reich genommen,
da Fried und Freude lacht,
da bist du, mein Heil, kommen
und hast mich froh gemacht.

4. Ich lag in schweren Banden,
du kommst und machst mich los;
ich stand in Spott und Schanden,
du kommst und machst mich groß
und hebst mich hoch zu Ehren
und schenkst mir großes Gut,
das sich nicht lässt verzehren,
wie irdisch Reichtum tut.

5. Nichts, nichts hat dich getrieben
zu mir vom Himmelszelt
als das geliebte Lieben,
damit du alle Welt
in ihren tausend Plagen
und großen Jammerlast,
die kein Mund kann aussagen,
so fest umfangen hast.

6. Das schreib dir in dein Herze,
du hochbetrübtes Heer,
bei denen Gram und Schmerze
sich häuft je mehr und mehr;
seid unverzagt, ihr habet
die Hilfe vor der Tür;
der eure Herzen labet
und tröstet, steht allhier.

7. Ihr dürft euch nicht bemühen
noch sorgen Tag und Nacht,
wie ihr ihn wollet ziehen
mit eures Armes Macht.
Er kommt, er kommt mit Willen,
ist voller Lieb und Lust,
all Angst und Not zu stillen,
die ihm an euch bewusst.

8. Auch dürft ihr nicht erschrecken
vor eurer Sünden Schuld;
nein, Jesus will sie decken
mit seiner Lieb und Huld.
Er kommt, er kommt den Sündern
zu Trost und wahrem Heil,
schafft, dass bei Gottes Kindern
verbleib ihr Erb und Teil.

9. Was fragt ihr nach dem Schreien
der Feind und ihrer Tück?
Der Herr wird sie zerstreuen
in einem Augenblick.
Er kommt, er kommt, ein König,
dem wahrlich alle Feind
auf Erden viel zu wenig
zum Widerstande seind.

10. Er kommt zum Weltgerichte:
zum Fluch dem, der ihm flucht,
mit Gnad und süßem Lichte
dem, der ihn liebt und sucht.
Ach komm, ach komm, o Sonne,
und hol uns allzumal
zum ewgen Licht und Wonne
in deinen Freudensaal.

English translation

1. O Lord, how shall I meet Thee,
How welcome Thee aright?
Thy people long to greet Thee,
My Hope, my heart’s Delight!
Oh, kindle, Lord most holy
Thy lamp within my breast
To do in spirit lowly
All that may please Thee best.

2. Thy Zion strews before Thee
Green boughs and fairest palms,
And I, too, will adore Thee
With joyous songs and psalms.
My heart shall bloom forever
For Thee with praises new
And from Thy name shall never
Withhold the honor due.

3. What hast Thou e'er neglected
For my good here below?
When heart and soul dejected,
Were sunk in deepest woe,
When lost from that high station
Where peace and pleasure reign,
Thou camest, my Salvation,
And mad'st me glad again.

4. I lay in fetters, groaning,
Thou com’st to set me free;
I stood, my shame bemoaning,
Thou com’st to honor me;
A glory Thou dost give me,
A treasure safe on high,
That will not fail or leave me
As earthly riches fly.

5. Love caused Thy incarnation,
Love brought Thee down to me;
Thy thirst for my salvation
Procured my liberty.
O love beyond all telling,
That led Thee to embrace,
In love all love excelling,
Our lost and fallen race!

6. Rejoice, then, ye sad-hearted,
Who sit in deepest gloom,
Who mourn o’er joys departed
And tremble at your doom.
Despair not, He is near you,
Yea, standing at the door.
Who best can help and cheer you,
And bids you weep no more.

7. Ye need not toil nor languish
Nor ponder day and night
How in the midst of anguish
Ye draw Him by your might.
He comes, He comes all willing,
Moved by His love alone,
Your woes and troubles stilling;
For all to Him are known.

8. Sin's debt, that fearful burden,
Let not your souls distress;
Your guilt the Lord will pardon
And cover by His grace.
He comes, for men procuring
The peace of sin forgiven,
For all God's sons securing
Their heritage in heaven.

9. What though the foes by raging,
Heed not their craft and spite;
Your Lord, the battle waging,
Will scatter all their might.
He comes, a King most glorious,
And all His earthly foes
In vain His course victorious
Endeavor to oppose.

10. He comes to judge the nations,
A terror to His foes,
A Light of consolations
And blessèd Hope to those
Who love the Lord's appearing.
O glorious Sun, now come,
Send forth Thy beams so cheering,
And guide us safely home!

== Melodies and settings ==
Johann Crüger first published the hymn in 1653 in the fifth edition of the hymnal Praxis pietatis melica by Johann Crüger, with a melody he composed himself.

Dieterich Buxtehude arranged the hymn as a cantata, BuxWV 109. The first stanza from the hymn also appears in Johann Sebastian Bach's Christmas Oratorio, but set to Hans Leo Hassler's "Befiehl du deine Wege" melody (Zahn 5385a)—the same melody as "O Haupt voll Blut und Wunden", which returns in the work's final movement.

In the current Protestant hymnal Evangelisches Gesangbuch, the song is EG 11. It is also part of several other hymnals and songbooks.
