= Nun danket all und bringet Ehr =

Christian hymn by Paul Gerhardt

- Lutheran hymn
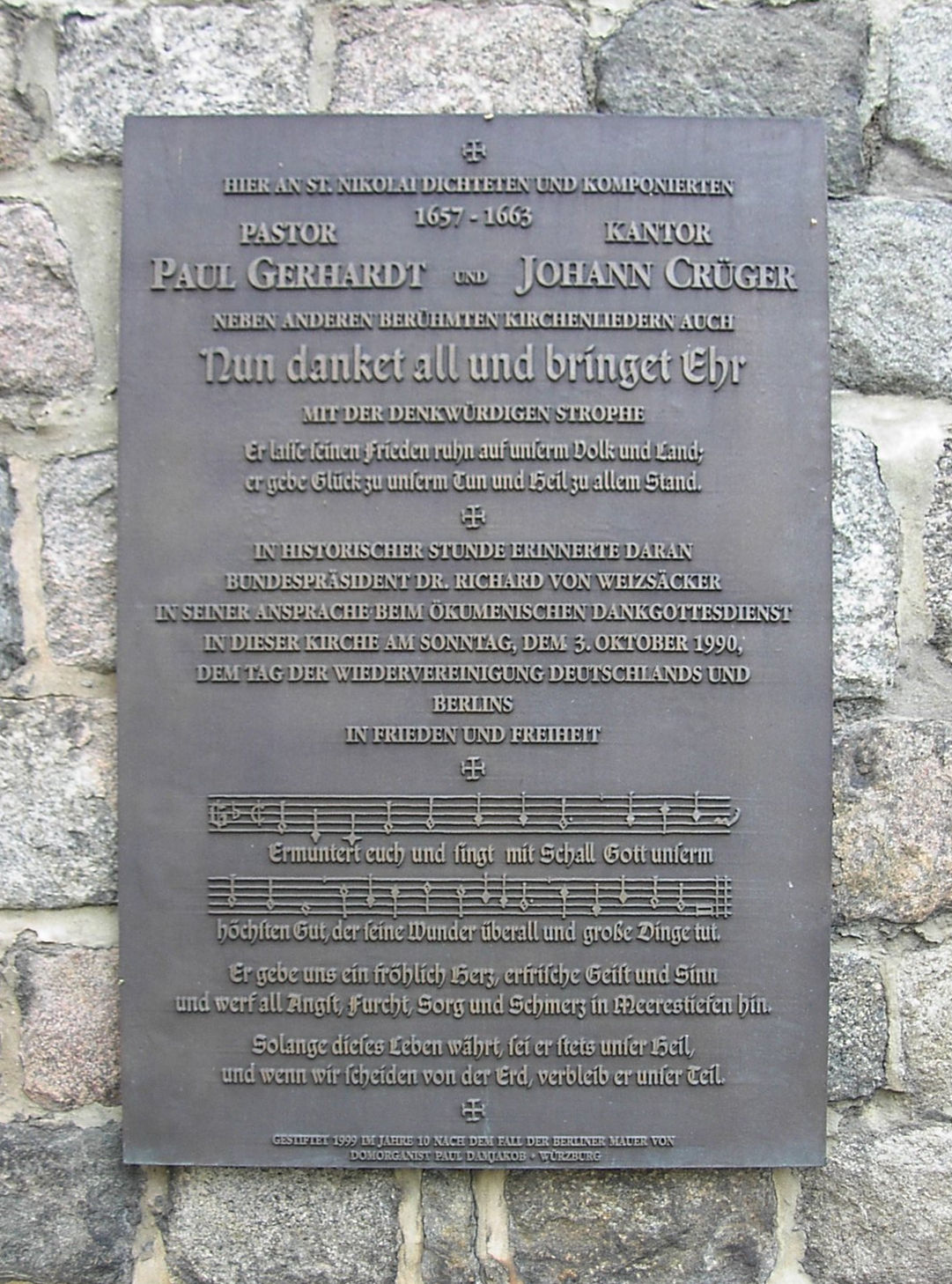
- Plaque at the Nikolaikirche, Berlin
- English: Now thank all and bring honour
- Text: by Paul Gerhardt
- Language: German
- Melody: by Johann Crüger
- Composed: 1653
- Published: 1647
- Tune EG 322

"Nun danket all und bringet Ehr" (Now thank all and bring honour) is a German Lutheran hymn in nine stanzas, with a text written by Paul Gerhardt. It was first published in 1647, in Johann Crüger's Praxis pietatis melica which was the first publication of hymns by Gerhardt. In the 1653 edition, Crüger added a melody that he composed. A general song of thanks, it has appeared in several hymnals, including the German Protestant hymnal Evangelisches Gesangbuch and the Catholic hymnal Gotteslob. It has inspired musical settings by composers from the 17th to the 21st century. Johann Sebastian Bach used the first stanza in a cantata, however with the melody of "Lobt Gott, ihr Christen alle gleich", Hugo Distler composed a chorale cantata, and Günter Berger based a toccata for organ on it.

== History ==
When Paul Gerhardt wrote "Nun danket all und bringet Ehr", he was 40 years old, had completed his theological studies but had not found a suitable position as a pastor yet. He worked as a private teacher in Berlin. The Thirty Years' War was in its final year. Nonetheless, he wrote a hymn of praise, in nine stanzas of four lines each. The song is related to a biblical passage, Wisdom of Sirach 50:22–24, expressing thanks and praise to God, and requesting further help. The same passage was the basis for the 1630 hymn "Nun danket all Gott" by Martin Rinckart, and several compositions of the 17th century. For the Lutheran Gerhardt, music was an image of heavenly bliss, and the laws of composition an image of the order of creation ("Als überzeugtem Lutheranerwar für ihn die Musik gleichsam ein vorweggenommenes Abbild himmlischer Herrlichkeit, die musikalischen Gesetze Sinnbild für die göttliche Ordnung der Schöpfung"), as he expressed in stanzas eight to eleven of his "Geh aus, mein Herz, und suche Freud".

"Nun danket all und bringet Ehr" was published by Johann Crüger who was the church musician at the Nikolaikirche in Berlin. It appeared in Crüger's hymnal Praxis pietatis melica in the (lost) 1647 edition, among the first 18 songs by Gerhardt to be published, which also include the Passion hymn "Ein Lämmlein geht und trägt die Schuld", the Easter hymn "Auf, auf, mein Herz, mit Freuden", the morning song "Wach auf, mein Herz, und singe", and the evening song "Nun ruhen alle Wälder". In the 1653 edition of the hymnal, which contained 80 songs by Gerhardt, it was printed with a melody by Crüger.

The hymn was sung to conclude all-day peace celebrations in Leipzig on 21 March 1763, for the Treaty of Hubertusburg.

In the German Protestant hymnal Evangelisches Gesangbuch, it appears as EG 322. In the Catholic hymnal Gotteslob, it is GL 403 with stanzas 1, 2, 5, 6, 8 and 9.

== Text ==
The text in German follows the Protestant hymnal Evangelisches Gesangbuch. Translations, which follow the rhythm rather than the literal meaning, were made by Pamela Dellal and Charles Stanford Terry.

Nun danket all und bringet Ehr,
ihr Menschen in der Welt,
dem, dessen Lob der Engel Heer
im Himmel stets vermeldt,

2 Ermuntert euch und singt mit Schall
Gott, unserm höchsten Gut,
der seine Wunder überall
und große Dinge thut.

3 Der uns vom Mutterleibe an
frisch und gesund erhält
und, wo kein Mensch nicht helfen kann,
sich selbst zum Helfer stellt.

4 Der, ob wir ihn gleich hoch betrübt,
doch bleibet gutes Muths,
die Straf erläßt, die Schuld vergibt
und thut uns alles Guts.

5 Er gebe uns ein fröhlich Herz,
erfrische Geist und Sinn,
und werf all Angst, Furcht, Sorg und Schmerz
ins Merres Tiefe hin.

6 Er lasse seinen Frieden ruhn
in Israelis Land,
er gebe Glück zu unserm Thun
und Heil zu allem Stand.

7 Er lasse seine Lieb und Güt
um, bei und mit uns gehn,
was aber ängstet und bemüht,
gar ferne von uns stehn.

8 So lange dieses Leben währt
sei er stets unser Heil
und bleib auch, wann wir von der Erd
abscheiden, unser Theil.

9 Er drucke, wenn das Herze bricht,
Uns unsre Augen zu
und zeig uns drauf sein Angesicht
dort in der ewgen Ruh.

Translation:

Now give thanks and bring honor,
all you people in the world,
to Him, whose praise the host of angels
in heaven continually herald.

Lift up your voice right heartily
To Him Who reigns above,
Who worketh for us wondrously
And showers on us His love!)

He since our mother gave us birth
In surety doth us hold,
And when man's aid's of little worth
Will in His care enfold.

He showers peace and plenteousness
Upon our Motherland,
With happiness He doth her bless
And strengthens her right hand.

So long as we have life and breath
His watch still may He keep!
And when we hear the call of death
In Jesus may we sleep!

== Melodies and settings ==
When Crüger published "Nun danket all und bringet Ehr" in the 1647 edition of his hymnal Praxis pietatis melica, it was possibly without a melody. The hymn appears in the 1653 edition with a melody by Crüger and a figured bass. The melody is close to tunes from the Genevan Psalter, for Psalm 75 and Psalm 97, which also express thanks. The first two lines are connected, and the other two lines form a similar rhythmic pattern, with the climax at the beginning of the third line. In 1657/58, Crüger composed a four-part setting, using the melody and bass line. The tune is comfortable for congregational singing, and has been adopted for many other hymns. It became known as "Gräfenberg", which appears in 173 hymnals.

The hymn is part of the Neu Leipziger Gesangbuch with the melody of "Lobt Gott, ihr Christen alle gleich". It is this melody that Johann Sebastian Bach set to close his cantata Dem Gerechten muß das Licht, BWV 195. In current German hymnals, the hymn appears with Crüger's melody.

Hugo Distler composed a chorale cantata, No. 2 of his Op. 11. Ulrich Metzner composed Toccata sopra 'Nun danket all und bringet Ehr' in 2009. Gaël Liardon wrote five chorale preludes in 2013. Günter Berger wrote an organ piece, subtitled Tanz-Toccata für Orgel, published by Strube-Verlag in 2015.
