= Sehet, wir gehn hinauf gen Jerusalem, BWV 159 =

Church cantata by Johann Sebastian Bach

Sehet, wir gehn hinauf gen Jerusalem
- BWV 159
- Church cantata by J. S. Bach
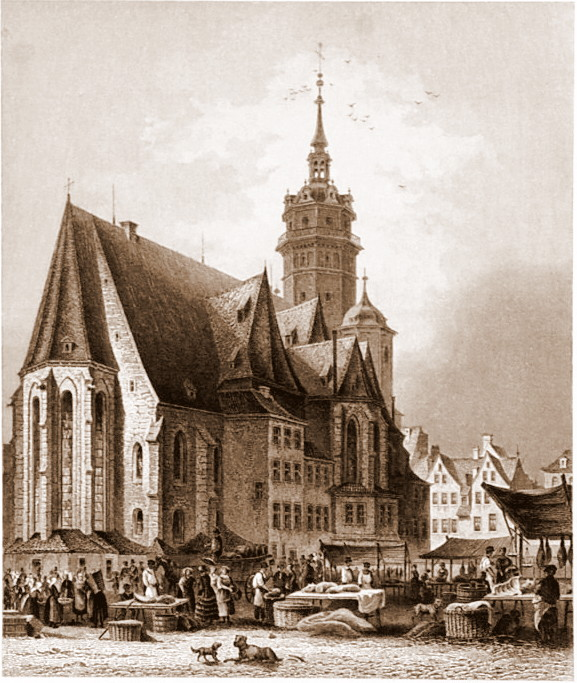
- Nikolaikirche, Leipzig
- Occasion: Estomihi
- Cantata text: Picander
- Chorale: Paul Gerhardt: "O Haupt voll Blut und Wunden"; Paul Stockmann: "Jesu Leiden, Pein und Tod"
- Performed: 27 February 1729?: Leipzig
- Movements: 5
- Vocal: SATB solo and choir
- Instrumental: oboe; 2 violins; viola; continuo

Sehet, wir gehn hinauf gen Jerusalem (Behold, let us go up to Jerusalem), BWV 159, is a church cantata by Johann Sebastian Bach. He composed it in Leipzig for the Sunday Estomihi, the last Sunday before Lent, and probably first performed it on 27 February 1729. The gospel reading for the Sunday, from the Gospel of Luke, includes Jesus announcing his suffering and death in Jerusalem. The cantata's theme and Bach's music foreshadow his Passion.

The cantata text was written by Picander, who also wrote the text for Bach's St Matthew Passion which would have its second performance on Good Friday later that year. He included two stanzas from Passion hymns, Paul Gerhardt's "O Haupt voll Blut und Wunden", and a stanza from Paul Stockmann's "Jesu Leiden, Pein und Tod" as the closing chorale. Bach structured the work in five movements, and scored it for four vocal soloists, a four-part choir only in the closing chorale, and a Baroque instrumental ensemble of oboe, two violin parts, viola and continuo. The first movement is a dialogue between bass and alto, with the bass as the voice of Christ quoting a line from the gospel reading, and the alto representing his followers who resent the announcement. The second movement is a duet of alto and soprano, with the alto continuing the concerns of a follower, juxtaposed by the chorale. The later three movements follow the usual sequence of recitative, aria and chorale. The text of the aria begins with a quote from the Gospel of John, "Es ist vollbracht" (It is accomplished), which Bach set in his St John Passion, which is also a quote from the gospel reading's announcement.

== History and words ==
Bach wrote Sehet, wir gehn hinauf gen Jerusalem in Leipzig for Estomihi (Quinquagesima), the last Sunday before Lent. During Lent, Leipzig observed tempus clausum, and no figural music was permitted. In 1723, Bach had performed two cantatas for the occasion, Du wahrer Gott und Davids Sohn, BWV 23, composed earlier in Köthen, and Jesus nahm zu sich die Zwölfe, BWV 22, both as audition pieces to apply for the post of Thomaskantor in Leipzig. In 1729 the cantata was the last cantata performance in a Sunday service. The next music for voices and orchestra that year would be his St Matthew Passion on Good Friday. Sehet, wir gehn hinauf gen Jerusalem is regarded as part of Bach's fourth cantata cycle, also called Picander cycle.

The prescribed readings for the Sunday were taken from the First Epistle to the Corinthians, "praise of love" (1 Corinthians 13:1–13), and from the Gospel of Luke, healing the blind near Jericho (Luke 18:31–43). The gospel reading includes Jesus announcing his suffering in Jerusalem. While Bach's earlier cantatas for the occasion also reflected the healing, this work is focused on reflecting the Passion.

The text was produced by Picander, who also wrote the text for the St Matthew Passion. He published it in his collection Cantaten auf die Sonn- und Fest-Tage (Cantatas for the Sundays and feast days) of 1728. The poet focused on the announcement of suffering, which is regarded as tremendous (movement 1), as an example to follow (2), as a reason to say farewell to earthly pleasures (3), finally as a reason to give thanks (4, 5). In movement 2 the poet juxtaposed his recitative by stanza 6 of Paul Gerhardt's "O Haupt voll Blut und Wunden", a hymn that appears in the St Matthew Passion in this and four other stanzas. The beginning of movement 4, "Es ist vollbracht" ("It is accomplished", John 19:30), appears literally in the Gospel of John as one of the Sayings of Jesus on the cross, and is announced in the Sunday's gospel reading: "... all things that are written by the prophets concerning the Son of man shall be accomplished" (Luke 18:31). Bach's St John Passion contains an alto aria beginning with this line, as a summary immediately after the death of Jesus. The closing chorale of the cantata is the last of 33 stanzas of Paul Stockmann's "Jesu Leiden, Pein und Tod" (1633).

Bach probably first performed the cantata on 27 February 1729, or possibly earlier.

== Music ==
=== Structure and scoring ===
Bach structured the cantata in five movements. He scored the work for four vocal soloists (soprano (S), alto (A), tenor (T) and bass (B)), a four-part choir only in the closing chorale, and a Baroque instrumental ensemble of oboe (Ob), two violins (Vl), viola (Va) and basso continuo. The first movement is a dialogue of the bass as the vox Christi who sings a quotation from the gospel, and the alto representing a follower, named a "faithful Soul" by Dürr. The second movement is a dialogue of the alto, and the soprano (S) singing a stanza from Paul Gerhardt's hymn. The soprano part can be sung by a soloist or the soprano section of the choir. The third and to fifth movements are more the usual sequence of recitative, aria and four-part closing chorale. The duration of the cantata is given as 17 minutes.

In the following table of the movements, the scoring, keys and time signatures are taken from Dürr. The continuo, which plays throughout, is not shown.

Movements of Sehet, wir gehn hinauf gen Jerusalem
No.	Title	Text	Type	Vocal	Wind	Strings	Key	Time
1	Sehet, wir gehn hinauf gen Jerusalem; Komm, schaue doch, mein Sinn	Luke; Picander	Arioso; Recitative	Bass; Alto		2Vl Va	C minor	common time
2	Ich folge dir nach; Ich will hier bei dir stehen	Picander; Gerhardt	Aria; Chorale	Alto; Soprano	Ob		E♭ major	6/8
3	Nun will ich mich, mein Jesu	Picander	Recitative	Tenor			B♭ major	common time
4	Es ist vollbracht	Picander	Aria	Bass	Ob	2Vl Va	B♭ major	common time
5	Jesu, deine Passion ist mir lauter Freude	Stockmann	Chorale	SATB	Ob	2Vl Va	E♭ major	common time

=== Movements ===
==== 1 ====
Without any choral opening, the first movement is a dialogue of two characters. A line that Jesus says in the gospel reading is sung by the bass as the vox Christi (voice of Christ). The alto represents a follower, expressing the reaction to the announcement. Bach achieves dramatic contrast, setting the words of Jesus as an arioso, accompanied by the continuo, while the alto answers in a recitativo accompagnato, with the strings. This instrumentation is opposite to the treatment in the St Matthew Passion, where the words of Jesus are accompanied by the "halo" of a string quartet.

The line from the gospel is broken in three parts, interrupted by the alto. Sehet ("Behold", literally: see!) is expressed in a long melisma. After an intervention of the alto, the move uphill in illustrated by an upward scale. After another reply of the alto, the destination is named: Jerusalem. The phrase is repeated several times, accenting different words each time, to present different aspects of its meaning following the principle of monody. John Eliot Gardiner, who conducted the Bach Cantata Pilgrimage in 2000, compared the expressiveness of the alto's "outpouring of grief" to the aria "Ach Golgatha" from the St Matthew Passion.

==== 2 ====
In the second movement, the expressive melodic lines of the alto are juxtaposed to the chorale on the melody of "Befiehl du deine Wege". The Soul begins "Ich folge dir nach" ("I follow after You"), while the first line from the chorale states: "Ich will hier bei dir stehen" ("I will stay here with You"), The process, with the alto voice beginning sooner and ending later than the chorale line, is repeated for the other lines of the chorale, in the end combining the alto's "Und wenn du endlich scheiden mußt, sollst du dein Grab in mir erlangen" ("And if You must depart at last, You shall find Your grave in me"), to the choral's "Alsdenn will ich dich fassen in meinen Arm und Schoß" ("Then I will hold You fast in my arm and bosom"), The melodic treatment is described as powerful and expressive.

==== 3 ====
A secco recitative of the tenor expresses first sorrow about the way to death, "Nun will ich mich, mein Jesu, über dich in meinem Winkel grämen" ("Now, over You, my Jesus, I will grieve in my corner"), and finally turns to the expectation for an ultimate union with Jesus: "... bis ich durch dich erlöset bin; da will ich mich mit dir erquicken" ("... until I am redeemed through You; then I will be refreshed with You").

==== 4 ====
The cantata culminates in the forth movement, with the vox Christi reflecting the completion of the Passion, "Es ist vollbracht". The oboe introduces a meditative motif. The bass picks it up, and both rest on long sustained string chords. The middle section illustrates the words "Nun will ich eilen" ("Now I will hasten") in runs of the voice, oboe and now also the violins. A quasi da capo resumes the first motif, now on the words "Welt, gute Nacht" ("World, good night"). The aria was described by a reviewer as a "hauntingly affective reflection on Jesus's last words from the cross", with a "wrenchingly beautiful oboe line", "rich suspensions", and an "unusually contoured melody".

==== 5 ====
In Picander's printed cantata text, another recitative, "Herr Jesu, dein verdienstlich Leiden" introduced the closing chorale. It is unclear if Bach intentionally did not compose it, or if it got lost. The closing chorale is a four-part setting of Stockmann's hymn which summarises the Passion: "Jesu, deine Passion ist mir lauter Freude" ("Jesus, Your passion is pure joy to me"). Gardiner notes that Bach set the melody by Melchior Vulpius with "wonderfully satisfying chromatic harmonies over a lyrical bass line".

== Manuscripts and publication ==
Bach's manuscript autograph of the score is lost. A manuscript score, dating from c. 1770 is held by the Staatsbibliothek zu Berlin – Preußischer Kulturbesitz.

The cantata was first published in 1886 as No. 159 by the Bach-Gesellschaft Ausgabe (BGA), in volume 32 edited by E. Naumann. The New Bach Edition (Neue Bach-Ausgabe, NBA) published the score in 1992, edited by Christoph Wolff, with the critical commentary published in 1998.

== Recordings ==
Recordings of Sehet, wir gehn hinauf gen Jerusalem
Title	Conductor / Choir / Orchestra	Soloists	Label	Year	Instr.
J. S. Bach: Cantatas No. 82, Cantata No. 159	Karl Ristenpart Kammerorchester des Saarländischen Rundfunks	Ingeborg Reichelt; Annelotte Sieber-Ludwig; Jakob Stämpfli	Club français du disque	1958	
J. S. Bach: Cantatas BWV 23 & BWV 159	Kurt Thomas Frankfurter Kantorei Deutsche Bachsolisten	Eva Bornemann; Johannes Hoefflin; Jakob Stämpfli	Cantate	1963	
J. S. Bach Cantatas – Kantaten 170, 82 & 159	Neville Marriner St Anthony Singers Academy of St Martin in the Fields	Janet Baker; Robert Tear; John Shirley-Quirk	Oiseau Lyre	1966	
Die Bach Kantate Vol. 28	Helmuth Rilling Gächinger Kantorei Bach-Collegium Stuttgart	Julia Hamari; Aldo Baldin; Philippe Huttenlocher	Hänssler	1984	
J. S. Bach: Das Kantatenwerk • Complete Cantatas • Les Cantates, Folge / Vol. 38	Gustav Leonhardt: Tölzer Knabenchor; Collegium Vocale Gent; Leonhardt-Consort	Soloist of the Tölzer Knabenchor; Paul Esswood; Kurt Equiluz; Max van Egmond	Teldec	1986	Period
Bach Cantatas Vol. 21: King’s College Chapel, Cambridge	John Eliot Gardiner Monteverdi Choir English Baroque Soloists	Claudia Schubert; James Oxley; Peter Harvey	Soli Deo Gloria	2000	Period
Bach Edition Vol. 18 – Cantatas Vol. 9	Pieter Jan Leusink Holland Boys Choir Netherlands Bach Collegium	Marjon Strijk; Knut Schoch; Bas Ramselaar	Brilliant Classics	2000	Period
J. S. Bach: Complete Cantatas Vol. 19	Ton Koopman Amsterdam Baroque Orchestra & Choir	Bogna Bartosz; James Gilchrist; Klaus Mertens	Antoine Marchand	2002	Period
J. S. Bach: Jesus, deine Passion – Cantates BWV 22, 23, 127 & 159	Philippe Herreweghe Collegium Vocale Gent	Matthew White; Jan Kobow; Peter Kooy	Harmonia Mundi France	2007	Period
J. S. Bach: Cantatas Vol. 34 (Cantatas from Leipzig 1725)	Masaaki Suzuki Bach Collegium Japan	Rachel Nicholls; Gerd Türk; Peter Kooy	BIS	2011	Period

== Cited sources ==
- Baek, Jung Jin (14 May 2012). "A Conductor's Guide to J. S. Bach's Quinquagesima Cantatas (Dissertation)". University of Cincinnati.
- Chien, George (2011). "Bach: Cantatas Vol 49 / Suzuki, Bach Collegium Japan". arkivmusic.com. Archived from the original on 1 March 2021.
- Cookson, Michael (March 2010). "Jesu, Deine Passion – Bach: Cantatas Bwv 22, 23, 127 & 159 / Herreweghe, Mields, White, Et Al". musicweb-international.com.
- Dahn, Luke (2019). "BWV 159.5". bach-chorales.com.
- Dellal, Pamela. "BWV 159 – Sehet, wir gehn hinauf gen Jerusalem". Emmanuel Music.
- Dürr, Alfred; Jones, Richard D. P. (2006). "Sehet, wir gehn hinauf gen Jerusalem, BWV 159". The Cantatas of J. S. Bach: With Their Librettos in German-English Parallel Text. Oxford University Press. pp. 250–253. ISBN 978-0-19-969628-4.
- Eriksson, Erik (2011). "Cantata No. 159, "Sehet, wir gehn hinauf gen Jerusalem," BWV 159". Allmusic.
- Gardiner, John Eliot (2006). Johann Sebastian Bach 1685 -1750 / Cantatas Vol 21: Cambridge/Walpole St Pete (PDF) (Media notes). Monteverdi Choir. pp. 21–22.
- Hoffman, Gary (2007). "Bach Cantatas, Volume 21". operatoday.com.
- Leisinger, Ulrich (1995). Johann Seastian Bach / Sehet, wir gehn hinauf gen Jerusalem / Come ye, our way is up to Jerusalem / BWV 159 (PDF). Translated by Kosviner, David. Stuttgart: Carus-Verlag. pp. 3–4.
- Mincham, Julian (2010). "Chapter 41 BWV 159 Sehet! wir gehn hinauf gen Jerusalem". jsbachcantatas.com.
- Whittaker, W. Gillies (1978). "Cantata No. 159". The Cantatas of Johann Sebastian Bach: Sacred and Secular. Vol. I (Reprint ed.). Oxford University Press. pp. 421–425. ISBN 019315238X.
- "Sehet, wir gehn hinauf gen Jerusalem BWV 159; BC A 50 / Sacred cantata (Estomihi)". Bach Digital. 2019.
- "Berlin, Staatsbibliothek zu Berlin – Preußischer Kulturbesitz / D-B Mus.ms. Bach P 1048". Bach Digital. 2020.
- "Notice bibliographique". Bibliothèque nationale de France. 1960.
- "Notice bibliographique". Bibliothèque nationale de France. 1963.
- "Notice bibliographique". Bibliothèque nationale de France. 1966.
- "Notice bibliographique". Bibliothèque nationale de France. 1984.
- "Johann Sebastian Bach / Ton Koopman / The Amsterdam Baroque Orchestra / Complete Bach Cantatas Vol. 19". Challenge Records. 2005.
- "Bach Cantatas, Vol. 1". Gramophone. February 1995.
