= Lobet den Herren alle, die ihn ehren =

Lutheran morning hymn

- Lutheran hymn
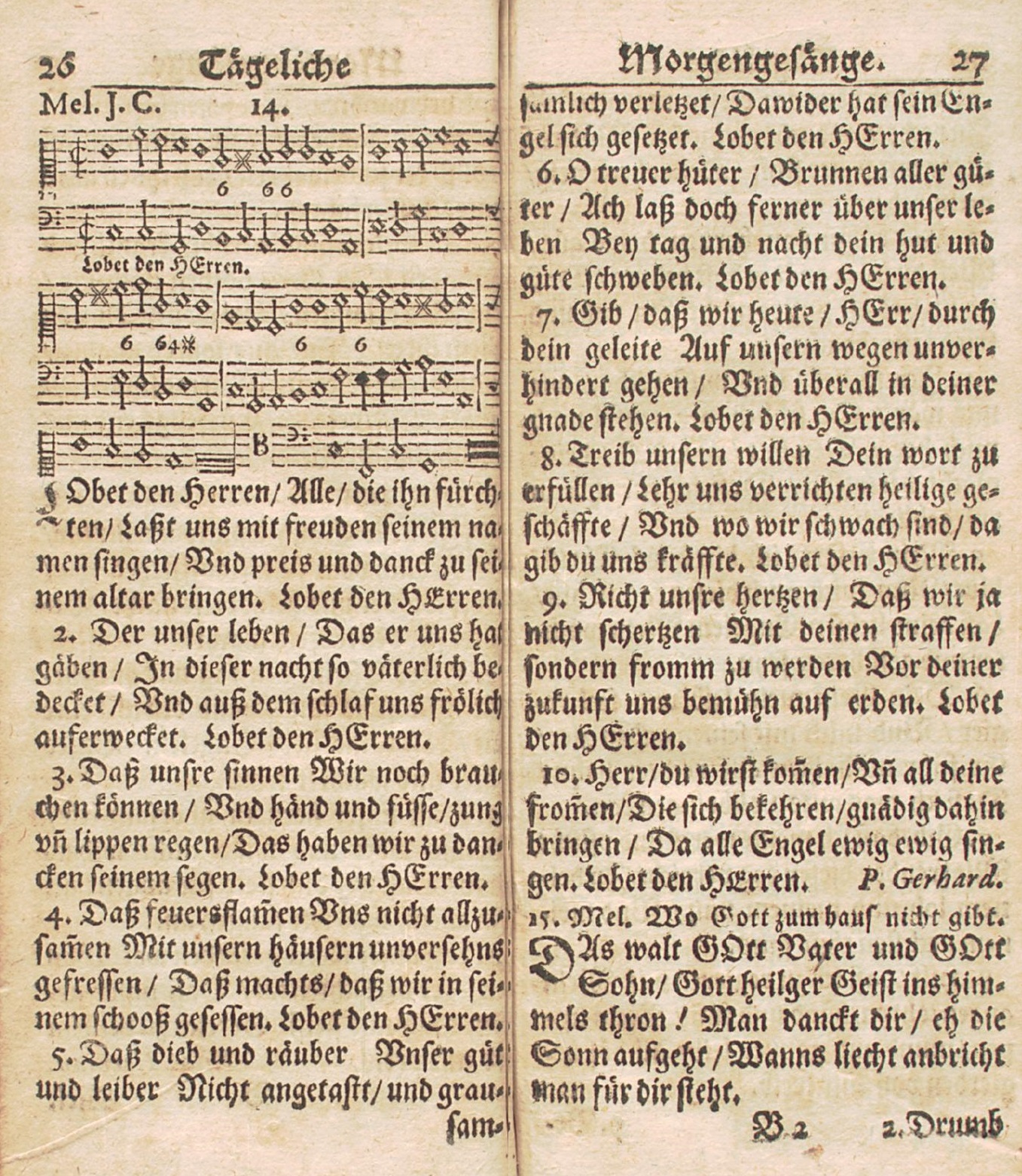
- English: Praise the Lord all who honour him
- Text: by Paul Gerhardt
- Language: German
- Melody: Johann Crüger
- Published: 1653

"Lobet den Herren alle, die ihn ehren" (Praise the Lord, all who honour him) is a sacred morning song with a text by Paul Gerhardt and a melody by Johann Crüger, who first published it in the fifth edition of his hymnal Praxis pietatis melica in 1653. The Lutheran hymn is still popular and appears in hymnals including the Protestant Evangelisches Gesangbuch and the Catholic Gotteslob.

== History ==
Gerhardt wrote the text of the song in ten stanzas of four lines each. Johann Crüger composed a melody to fit and published it, first with the incipit "Lobet den Herren alle, die ihn fürchten" (... who fear him), in 1653 in the fifth edition of his hymnal Praxis pietatis melica, in a section "Tägliche Morgengesänge" (daily morning songs). It is part of many hymnals in German. Georg Thurmair included it as one of several songs by Protestant authors in his hymnal Kirchenlied in 1938 in the section Morning. It is part of the Protestant Evangelisches Gesangbuch (1995) as EG 447, and the Catholic Gotteslob (2013), as GL 81, however without stanzas 4, 5 and 9. The first line decorates a plaque for Paul Gerhardt at the Nikolaikirche in Berlin where he was minister.

== Text ==
The poem has ten stanzas, each with three lines of eleven syllables and final line of five syllables, always the same picking up the first call, "Lobet den Herren". This Strophe format was often used in poetry of German Humanism and Baroque, and was called Sapphic stanza. It is also used in hymns such as "Herzliebster Jesu" by Johann Heermann. The rhyming is unconventional, rhyming within the two halves of the first line, but leaving the final line without rhyme. All new hymnals change in the first line "fürchten" to "ehren" to comply with the scheme.

The repeated line "Lobet den Herren" has the same function as the biblical Hallelujah: both a call to praise, and the praise. Gerhardt uses it for a morning prayer, beginning the day with praise, motivated in stanzas 2 to 5 by thanks for protection from dangers of the night. They may have been inspired by dangers experienced in the Thirty Years' War. Stanzas 6 to 9 are a prayer for further for guidance on a way following divine sommandments, expecting the second coming of Christ ("deiner Zukunft"). The last stanza envisions, in an eschatological outlook, the ultimate praise in community with the angels.

1660 version

LObet den Herren / Alle / die ihn fürchten /
Laßt uns mit freuden seinem namen singen /
Vnd preis und danck zu seinem altar bringen.
Lobet den HErren.

Der unser leben / Das er uns hat gäben /
Jn dieser nacht so väterlich bedecket /
Vnd auß dem schlaf uns frölich auferwecket.
Lobet den HErren.

Daß unsre sinnen Wir noch brauchen können /
Vnd händ und füsse / zung und lippen regen /
Das haben wir zu dancken seinem segen.
Lobet den HErren.

Daß feuersflammen Vns nicht allzusammen
Mit unsern häusern unversehns gefressen /
Daß machts / daß wir in seinem schooß gesessen.
Lobet den HErren.

Daß dieb und räuber Unser güt und leiber
Nicht angetastt / und grausamlich verletzet /
Dawider hat sein Engel sich gesetzet.
Lobet den HErren.

O treuer hüter / Brunnen aller güter /
Ach laß doch ferner über unser leben
Bey tag und nacht dein hut und güte schweben.
Lobet den HErren.

Gib / daß wir heute / HErr / durch dein geleite
Auf unsern wegen unverhindert gehen /
Vnd überall in deiner gnade stehen.
Lobet den HErren.

Treib unsern willen Dein wort zu erfüllen /
Lehr uns verrichten heilige geschäffte /
Vnd wo wir schwach sind / da gib du uns kräffte.
Lobet den HErren.

Richt unsre hertzen / Daß wir ja nicht schertzen
Mit deinen straffen / sondern fromm zu werden
Vor deiner zukunft uns bemühn auf erden.
Lobet den HErren.

Herr / du wirst kommen / Vnd all deine frommen /
Die sich bekehren / gnädig dahin bringen /
Da alle Engel ewig ewig singen.
Lobet den HErren.

EG 447

Lobet den Herren alle, die ihn ehren;
laßt uns mit Freuden seinem Namen singen
und Preis und Dank zu seinem Altar bringen.
Lobet den Herren!

Der unser Leben, das er uns gegeben,
in dieser Nacht so väterlich bedecket
und aus dem Schlaf uns fröhlich auferwecket:
Lobet den Herren!

Daß unsre Sinnen wir noch brauchen können
und Händ und Füße, Zung und Lippen regen,
das haben wir zu danken seinem Segen.
Lobet den Herren!

Daß Feuerflammen uns nicht allzusammen
mit unsern Häusern unversehns gefressen,
das macht’s, daß wir in seinem Schoß gesessen.
Lobet den Herren!

Daß Dieb und Räuber unser Gut und Leiber
nicht angetast’ und grausamlich verletzet,
dawider hat sein Engel sich gesetzet.
Lobet den Herren!

O treuer Hüter, Brunnen aller Güter,
ach laß doch ferner über unser Leben
bei Tag und Nacht dein Huld und Güte schweben.
Lobet den Herren!

Gib, daß wir heute, Herr, durch dein Geleite
auf unsern Wegen unverhindert gehen
und überall in deiner Gnade stehen.
Lobet den Herren!

Treib unsern Willen, dein Wort zu erfüllen;
hilf uns gehorsam wirken deine Werke;
und wo wir schwach sind, da gib du uns Stärke.
Lobet den Herren!

Richt unsre Herzen, daß wir ja nicht scherzen
mit deinen Strafen, sondern fromm zu werden
vor deiner Zukunft uns bemühn auf Erden.
Lobet den Herren!

Herr, du wirst kommen und all deine Frommen,
die sich bekehren, gnädig dahin bringen,
da alle Engel ewig, ewig singen:
„Lobet den Herren!“

== Melody and musical settings ==
Johann Crüger's melody in C major responds to the positive mood of the text. By changes of quarter notes and half notes, the rhythm of the Sapphic stanza is hidden. Crüger added a figured bass in his editions. The melody had baroque expressivity, but it often changed in modern editions, as also a syncope at the end of the third line.

Among the settings of the song is a cantata by Gustav Gunsenheimer for soloists, choir and instruments to his own melody.
