= Nun ruhen alle Wälder =

Sacred evening song by Paul Gerhardt

- Lutheran evening song
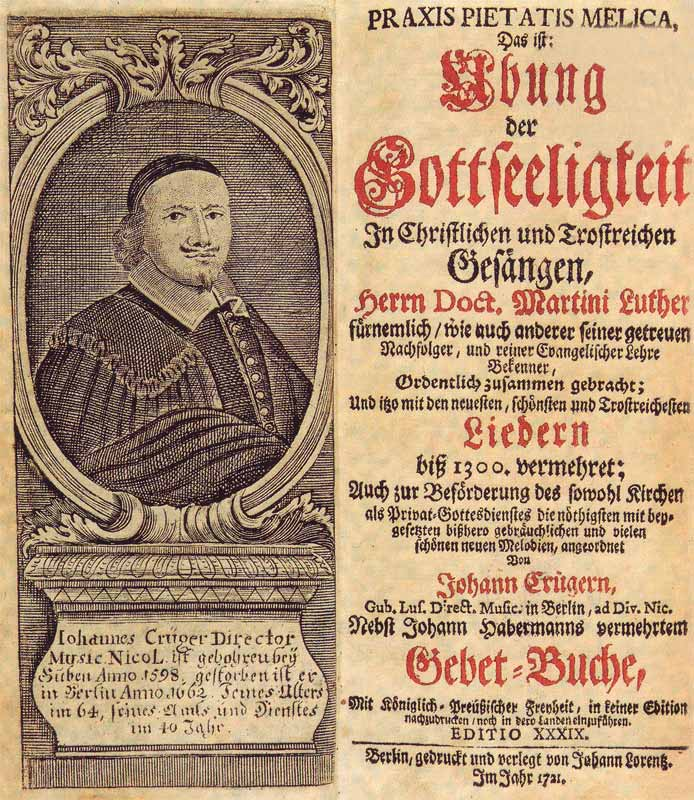
- Title page of the hymnal Praxis pietatis melica
- English: "Now all the woods are sleeping"
- Text: by Paul Gerhardt
- Language: German
- Melody: tune "O Welt, sieh hier dein Leben"
- Published: 1647 in Praxis pietatis melica

"Nun ruhen alle Wälder" ("Now all the woods are sleeping") is a sacred evening song in nine stanzas by Paul Gerhardt, first published in 1647 in Johann Crüger's hymnal Praxis Pietatis Melica. It is still part of Protestant hymnals and of songbooks, and the eighth stanza became used as an evening prayer for children. Catherine Winkworth created a version in English in 1865.

== History ==
Paul Gerhardt wrote the text of "Nun ruhen alle Wälder". It was first published in 1647 in Johann Crüger's hymnal Praxis Pietatis Melica, with the note to sing it to the tune of "O Welt, sieh hier dein Leben". This tune, first documented in 1598, is a sacred contrafact of Heinrich Isaac's "Innsbruck, ich muss dich lassen", dating back to around 1495. The tune, which comes in many rhythmic variations, was used by Johann Sebastian Bach in chorales such as BWV 392 and several movements of both his St John Passion and his St Matthew Passion. Johann Georg Ebeling, Crüger's successor at the Nikolaikirche in Berlin, composed a new melody in 1666/67 when he published a new edition of Gerhardt's song, but it was not widely distributed. Beginning in the 1650s, the song became part of many Protestant hymnals.

The song, appealing by rather simple poetry, nature observation and evening mood, became part of many secular songbooks such as the 1843 Liederbuch des deutschen Volkes and the 1925 Vaterländisches Volkslied. The song was ignored for Catholic hymnals, but it became part of the ecumenical Kirchenlied in 1938. The eighth stanza was often used independently as an evening prayer for children.

"Nun ruhen alle Wälder" is part of the Protestant hymnal Evangelisches Gesangbuch as EG 477 in all nine stanzas with a 1605 four-part setting by Bartholomäus Gesius. The Mennonitisches Gesangbuch has the song in all nine stanzas as No. 229, and the Gesangbuch der Evangelisch-methodistischen Kirche includes it in eight stanzas as No. 633, with a four-part setting and guitar chords. While it was not included in the Catholic 1975 Gotteslob, it was included in the 2013 Gotteslob as GL 101, in seven stanzas omitting 5 and 7, and with an equalised tune similar to Bach's settings.

== Text ==
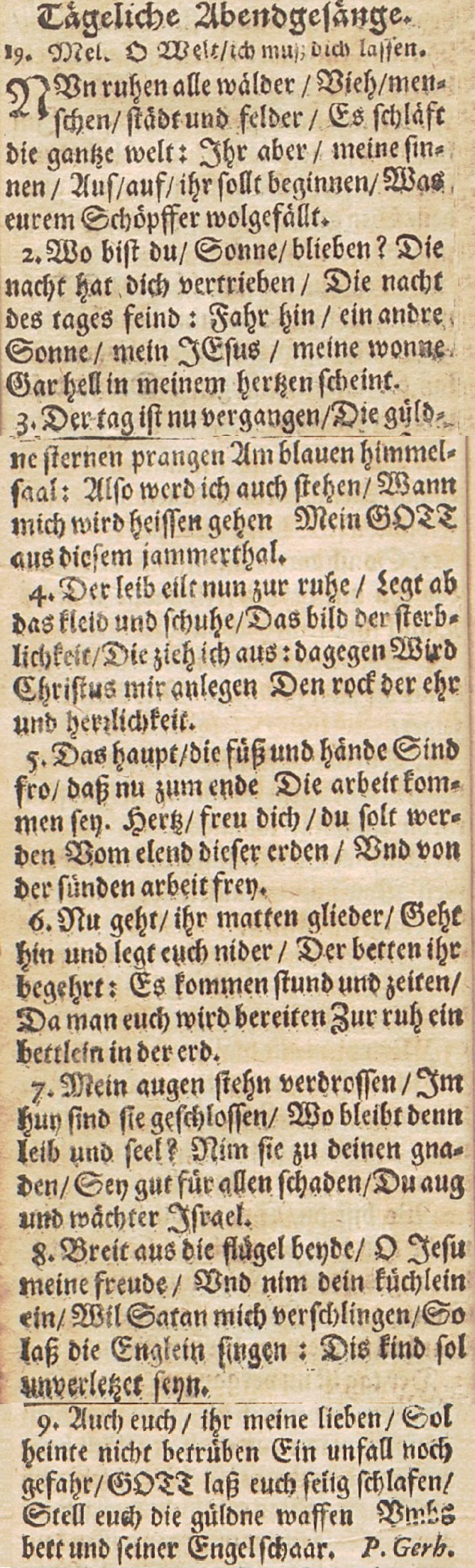
1660 print in Praxis Pietatis Melica

The text is given in the version of the Evangelisches Gesangbuch which differs only slightly from the original print, together with a translation by Catherine Winkworth.

1) Nun ruhen alle Wälder,
Vieh, Menschen, Städt und Felder,
es schläft die ganze Welt;
ihr aber, meine Sinnen,
auf, auf, ihr sollt beginnen,
was eurem Schöpfer wohlgefällt.

2) Wo bist du, Sonne, blieben?
Die Nacht hat dich vertrieben,
die Nacht, des Tages Feind.
Fahr hin; ein andre Sonne,
mein Jesus, meine Wonne,
gar hell in meinem Herzen scheint.

3) Der Tag ist nun vergangen,
die güldnen Sternlein prangen
am blauen Himmelssaal;
also werd ich auch stehen,
wenn mich wird heißen gehen
mein Gott aus diesem Jammertal.

4) Der Leib eilt nun zur Ruhe,
legt ab das Kleid und Schuhe,
das Bild der Sterblichkeit;
die zieh ich aus, dagegen
wird Christus mir anlegen
den Rock der Ehr und Herrlichkeit.

5) Das Haupt, die Füß und Hände
sind froh, dass nun zum Ende
die Arbeit kommen sei.
Herz, freu dich, du sollst werden
vom Elend dieser Erden
und von der Sünden Arbeit frei.

6) Nun geht, ihr matten Glieder,
geht hin und legt euch nieder,
der Betten ihr begehrt.
Es kommen Stund und Zeiten,
da man euch wird bereiten
zur Ruh ein Bettlein in der Erd.

7) Mein Augen stehn verdrossen,
im Nu sind sie geschlossen.
Wo bleibt dann Leib und Seel?
Nimm sie zu deinen Gnaden,
sei gut für allen Schaden,
du Aug und Wächter Israel’.

8) Breit aus die Flügel beide,
o Jesu, meine Freude,
und nimm dein Küchlein ein.
Will Satan mich verschlingen,
so lass die Englein singen:
"Dies Kind soll unverletzet sein."

9) Auch euch, ihr meine Lieben,
soll heute nicht betrüben
kein Unfall noch Gefahr.
Gott lass euch selig schlafen,
stell euch die güldnen Waffen
ums Bett und seiner Engel Schar.

Translation:

Now all the woods are sleeping,
And night and stillness creeping
O'er city, man, and beast;
But thou, my heart, awake thee,
To pray'r awhile betake thee,
And praise thy Maker ere thou rest.

O Sun, where art thou vanish'd?
The Night thy reign hath banish'd,
Thy ancient foe, the Night.
Farewell, a brighter glory
My Jesus sheddeth o'er me,
All clear within me shines His light.

The last faint beam is going,
The golden stars are glowing
In yonder dark-blue deep;
And such the glory given
When called of God to heaven,
On earth no more we pine and weep.

The body hastes to slumber,
These garments now but cumber,
And as I lay them by
I ponder how the spirit
Puts off the flesh t' inherit
A shining robe with Christ on high.

Now thought and labour ceases,
For Night the tired releases
And bids sweet rest begin:
My heart, there comes a morrow
Shall set thee free from sorrow,
And all the dreary toil of sin.

Ye aching limbs! now rest you,
For toil hath sore oppress'd you,
Lie down, my weary head:
A sleep shall once o'ertake you
From which earth ne'er shall wake you,
Within a narrower, colder bed.

My heavy eyes are closing;
When I lie deep reposing,
Soul, body, where are ye?
To helpless sleep I yield them,
Oh let Thy mercy shield them,
Thou sleepless Eye, their guardian be!

My Jesus, stay Thou by me,
And let no foe come nigh me,
Safe shelter'd by Thy wing;
But would the foe alarm me,
Oh let him never harm me,
But still Thine angels round me sing!

My loved ones, rest securely,
From every peril surely
Our God will guard your heads;
And happy slumbers send you,
And bid His hosts attend you,
And golden-arm'd watch o'er your beds.

== Melody ==
Tune as used by Bach

The first melody, as the older ones from which it was derived, features irregular longer and shorter notes, while Bach used mostly steady quarter notes (with embellishments) in his setting, BWV 392, the same way as in his settings in the Passions, such as "Wer hat dich so geschlagen" in the St Matthew Passion.

== Reception ==
Matthias Claudius took the same rhyme scheme for his Abendlied "Der Mond ist aufgegangen" which was first sung to the same tune as "Nun ruhen alle Wälder", until the melody by Johann Abraham Peter Schulz became popular.

The wording "es schläft die ganze Welt" was regarded as ridiculous during the Age of Enlightenment. When parishes in Berlin-Brandenburg opposed a new hymnal missing songs by Gerhardt, Frederick the Great argued for tolerance and a free choice but mentioned "Nun ruhen alle Wälder" as an example of a stupid song.

== Translation ==
The song was translated into Danish as "Nu hviler mark og enge, nu alle går til senge" in several versions from 1682, 1850 und 1889. It became part of the 2006 hymnal of the Heimvolkshochschule, Højskolesangbogen in its 18th editions as No. 533. A 1850 version in five stanzas by Frederik Hammerich of Peder Møller's 1682 translation became part of the Danish hymnal Den Danske Salmebog in 1953 as No. 703, and was retained in its 2002 edition as No. 759.

The song was translated into English by Catherine Winkworth as "Now all the woods are sleeping", published in the Chorale Book for England in London in 1865.
