= St Matthew Passion structure =

St Matthew Passion
- BWV 244
- Passion by J. S. Bach
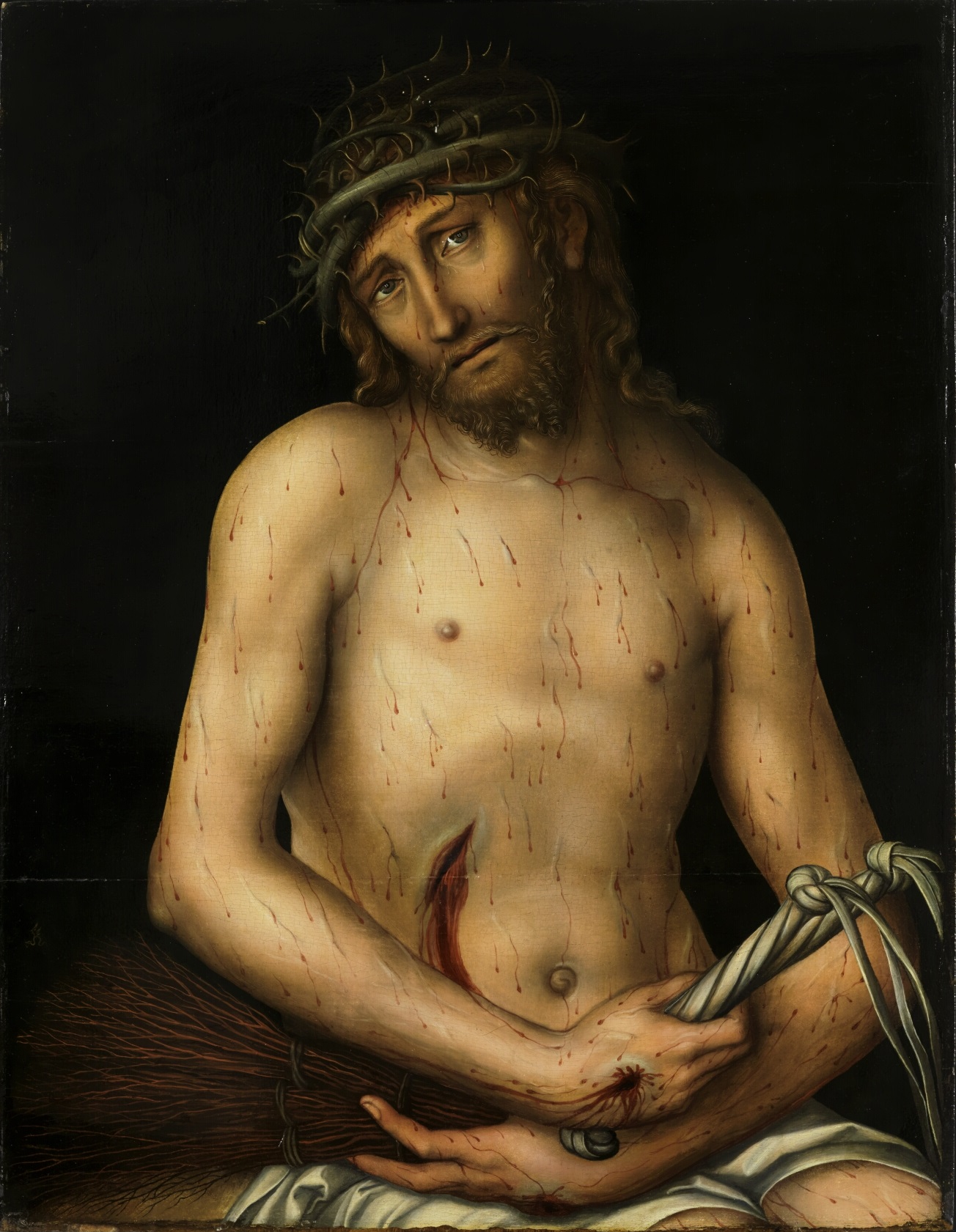
- Schmerzensmann (Man of sorrows) by Lucas Cranach the Elder (1515)
- Native name: Passio Domini Nostri J.C. Secundum Evangelistam Matthaeum
- Related: BWV 244a
- Occasion: Good Friday
- Text: Picander
- Bible text: Matthew 26–27
- Chorale: Nikolaus Decius; Johann Heermann; Paul Gerhardt; Albert, Duke in Prussia; Sebald Heyden; Adam Reusner; Johann Rist
- Performed: 11 April 1727: Leipzig
- Movements: 68 in two parts (29 + 39)
- Vocal: Two choirs SATB; Evangelist; Vox Christi; Solo: soprano, alto, tenor, bass, soliloquents
- Instrumental: Two orchestras, each of: 2 recorders; 2 flauti traversi; 2 oboes; 2 oboes da caccia; 2 oboes d'amore; bassoon; 2 violins; viola; viola da gamba; continuo

Johann Sebastian Bach's St Matthew Passion (Matthäuspassion), BWV 244, is structured on multiple levels: the composition is structured in three levels of text sources (Gospel, libretto and chorales) and by the different forms that are used for musical expression (arias, recitatives and choruses).

Bach's large choral composition was written to present the Passion of Jesus, as told in the Gospel of Matthew, in a vespers service on Good Friday. It is composed in two parts, that were to be performed before and after the sermon of that service. Part I covers the events until the arrest of Jesus and Part II concludes with his burial and the sealing of his grave.

Bach took the Gospel text for the composition from Martin Luther's German translation of Matthew 26 and 27. Contemporary poetry in Picander's libretto and chorales comment on the Bible text and open and close most scenes of the narration.

== Numbering of the movements ==
Bach did not number the sections of the St Matthew Passion but twentieth-century scholars have done so. The Bach-Werke-Verzeichnis (BWV, Bach Works Catalog) divides the work into 78 numbers (vocal movements), while the Neue Bach-Ausgabe (NBA, New Bach Edition) divides the piece into 68 movements. Both use lettered subsections in some cases. Movement numbers in this article follow the NBA scheme, except for the table with the movements that cross-references both numbering systems.

== Text based structure ==
The text is taken from three sources: the biblical texts, contemporary poetry by Picander and chorales.

=== Scene division based on the Gospel text ===
The St Matthew Passion can be divided in scenes or "stations" that follow the dramatic action of the Gospel account in different locations. Whatever the chosen scene division (none of them indicated by the composer in the score), scenes end on an aria, a chorus, or in the midst of a Gospel text section. In the latter case the ending of the scene would usually be on a turba chorus, such as Wahrlich, dieser ist Gottes Sohn gewesen ending the scene where Jesus dies at the cross.

New scenes begin with Gospel text sung by the Evangelist, except the first scene of each of the two parts of the composition. In other words, except for the chorus and aria that open Part One and Part Two, chorales and arias are a meditation after the narration of the action in the sung Gospel text.

NBA	16 scenes	Archiv
Part I
1–4a	1. "The chief priests seek to destroy Jesus"	Anointing in Bethany
4b–6	2. "Jesus is anointed with precious ointment"	Anointing in Bethany
7–8	3. "Judas plans the betrayal of Christ"	The Lord's Supper
9a–11	4. "The disciples prepare the Passover meal"	The Lord's Supper
12–13	5. "The Last Supper"	The Lord's Supper
14–17	6. "The Agony in the Garden"	The Lord's Supper
18–25	6. "The Agony in the Garden"	In Gethsemane
26–29	7. "The arrest of Jesus"	In Gethsemane
Part II
30–35	8. "The hearing before high priest Caiaphas"	False Witness
36–37	8. "The hearing before high priest Caiaphas"	Interrogation by Caiaphas and Pilate
38–40	9. "Peter's denial of Christ, and his remorse"	Interrogation by Caiaphas and Pilate
41–44	10. "Judas' repentance and death"	Interrogation by Caiaphas and Pilate
45–52	11. "The trial before Pontius Pilate"	Jesus' Delivery and Flagellation
53–54	12. "Soldiers crown Jesus with thorns, mocking him"	Jesus' Delivery and Flagellation
55–60	13. "Crucifixion"	Crucifixion
61–63b	14. "Death of Jesus, followed by an earthquake"	Crucifixion
63c–66a	15. "Descent from the Cross; Christ's burial"	The Interment
66b–68	16. "Chief priests demand the tomb be sealed"	The Interment

=== Libretto ===
Christian Friedrich Henrici (Picander), who collaborated with Bach, wrote text for recitatives and arias, and for the large scale choral movements that open and close the Passion. Other libretto sections came from publications by Salomo Franck and Barthold Heinrich Brockes.

Scenes can be opened and closed by arias: No. 6 Buß und Reu, an aria for alto, concludes the scene at Bethany. Part II opens with an aria, Ach! nun ist mein Jesus hin!.

=== Chorales ===
The oldest chorale chosen for the Passion dates from 1525. Bach used the hymns in different ways, most are four-part setting, two are the cantus firmus of the two chorale fantasias framing Part I, one as a commenting element in a tenor recitative.

Three of the texts Bach used for chorale settings are written by Paul Gerhardt. Bach included five stanzas of his "O Haupt voll Blut und Wunden" in the Passion, and he uses the first two stanzas of the poem to conclude the Flagellation scene.

Chorales in St Matthew Passion
Author	Date	Hymn; Stanza		Stanza incipit	No.	Set as...
Nikolaus Decius	1541	O Lamm Gottes, unschuldig	1	O Lamm Gottes, unschuldig	1	cantus firmus (Note: Without text (played by organ only) in older versions of the Passion) in choral movement
Johann Heermann	1630	Herzliebster Jesu	1	Herzliebster Jesu, was hast du verbrochen	3	four-part chorale
Paul Gerhardt	1647	O Welt, sieh hier dein Leben	5	Ich bin's, ich sollte büßen	10	four-part chorale
Paul Gerhardt	1656	O Haupt voll Blut und Wunden	5	Erkenne mich, mein Hüter	15	four-part chorale
Paul Gerhardt	1656	O Haupt voll Blut und Wunden	7	Es dient zu meinen Freuden	17 (Note: Only in version BWV 244b)	four-part chorale
Paul Gerhardt	1656	O Haupt voll Blut und Wunden	6	Ich will hier bei dir stehen	17 (Note: Not in version BWV 244b)	four-part chorale
Johann Heermann	1630	Herzliebster Jesu	3	Was ist doch wohl die Ursach	19	coro II in tenor recitative
Albert, Duke of Prussia	1547	Was mein Gott will, das g'scheh allzeit	1	Was mein Gott will, das g'scheh allzeit	25	four-part chorale
Christian Keymann	1658	Meinen Jesum laß ich nicht	6	Jesum laß' ich nicht von mir	29	four-part chorale
Sebald Heyden	1525	O Mensch, bewein dein Sünde groß	1	O Mensch, bewein dein Sünde groß	29	cantus firmus in choral movement
Adam Reusner	1533	In dich hab ich gehoffet, Herr	5	Mir hat die Welt trüglich gericht'	32	four-part chorale
Paul Gerhardt	1647	O Welt, sieh hier dein Leben	3	Wer hat dich so geschlagen	37	four-part chorale
Johann Rist	1642	Werde munter, mein Gemüte	6	Bin ich gleich von dir gewichen	40	four-part chorale
Paul Gerhardt	1656	Befiehl du deine Wege	1	Befiehl du deine Wege	44	four-part chorale
Johann Heermann	1630	Herzliebster Jesu	4	Wie wunderbarlich ist doch diese Strafe!	46	four-part chorale
Paul Gerhardt	1656	O Haupt voll Blut und Wunden	1	O Haupt voll Blut und Wunden	54	four-part chorale
Paul Gerhardt	1656	O Haupt voll Blut und Wunden	2	Du edles Angesichte	54, cont.	four-part chorale
Paul Gerhardt	1656	O Haupt voll Blut und Wunden	9	Wenn ich einmal soll scheiden	62	four-part chorale

== Musical structure ==
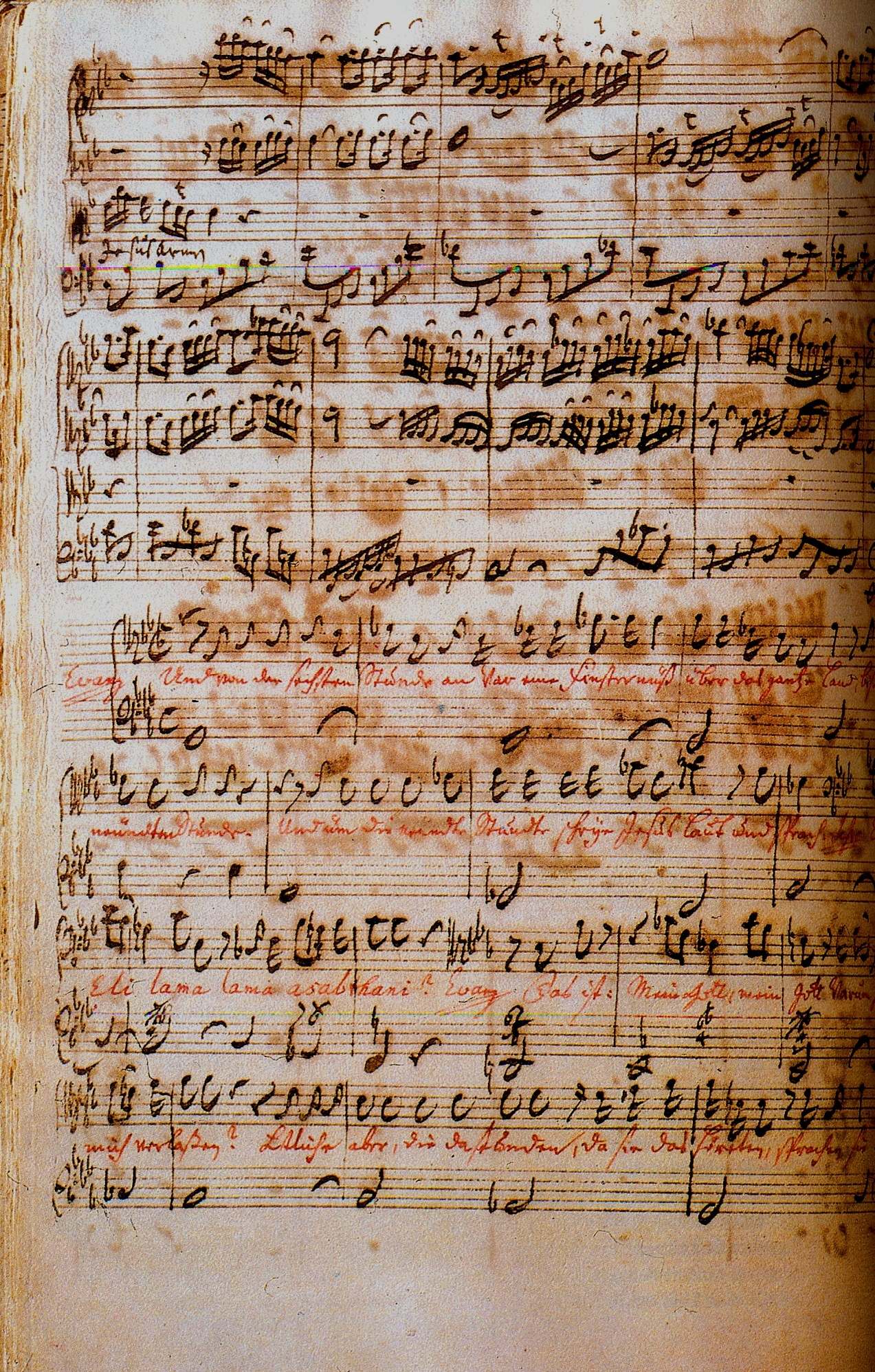
Beginning of recitative No. 61a (NBA), the Biblical quotation written in red

The work is composed for double choir, double orchestra, and vocal soloists. The choirs are abbreviated Ch I and Ch II, individual voice parts as S (soprano), A (alto), T (tenor), and B (bass). Both choirs are four-part, SATB. The orchestra consists of woodwinds, strings, and basso continuo (Bc). Woodwinds are recorders, flauto traverso (transverse flute) (Ft), oboe (Ob), oboe d'amore (Oa), and oboe da caccia (Oc). Strings are violin (Vn), solo violin (Vs), viola (Va), lute (Lt), and viola da gamba (Vg). Continuo are violoncello, double bass, bassoon, and organ.

The Bible story is told by the Evangelist (Ev) in secco recitative, and by the characters that have direct speech in the narrative. The speech of Jesus sings in accompagnato recitative, except at the beginning of No. 61a where Jesus utters his last words "Eli, Eli, lama, lama asabthani" [sic] in recitative secco (see facsimile image on the right). The speech of other persons, called soliloquents, is also set as secco recitative. Soliloquents are Judas (B), Peter (B), two witnesses (A T), two high priests (B), two maids (S), Pilate (B), and his wife (S). The speech of groups such as the disciples and the crowd, are expressed in turba choruses.

Reflecting thoughts on contemporary poetry appear as sequence of recitatives (rec) and arias, sometimes just the latter, and in choral movements. Most chorales are four-part settings. Several movements use a combination of forms, such as an aria with chorale, a chorale fantasia, a chorus with a chorale as a cantus firmus. Chorales were performed by both groups combined, with each voice type in unison. Movement 63b, Wahrlich, dieser ist Gottes Sohn gewesen (Truly, this man was God's own Son most truly), is treated the same way. Part I ends with a chorale fantasia that is based on the opening chorus of the St John Passion in its second version, also performed by both choirs in unison, whereas the opening chorus is for double choir with the chorale "O Lamm Gottes, unschuldig" as the cantus firmus, which was originally played, later sung. The closing chorus is in da capo form for two choirs.

== Movements ==
Column 1 of the table is the movement number in the Neue Bach-Ausgabe; column 2 is this number in the Bach-Werke-Verzeichnis. The last column shows the incipit, the first measures of each movement with text.

Structure of St Matthew Passion, Part I
NBA	BWV	Gospel	Ch 1	Ch II	Key	Time	Instr.	Beginning of text	Source	Incipit
1	1	Chorale S	Ch I	Ch II	E minor	12/8	2Ft 2Ob; 2Vn Va; Bc	Kommt, ihr Töchter, helft mir klagen + chorale O Lamm Gottes, unschuldig as cantus firmus	Picander + Nicolaus Decius	
2	2	Ev, Jesus			G major → B minor	common time	2Vn Va; Bc	Da Jesus diese Rede vollendet hatte	Mt 26:1–2	
3	3		Chorale		B minor	common time	2Ft 2Ob; 2Vn Va; Bc	Herzliebster Jesu	Johann Heermann	
4a	4	Ev			D major → C major	common time	Bc	Da versammleten sich die Hohenpriester	Mt 26:3–4	
4b	5	Ch I		Ch II	C major	common time	2Ft 2Ob; 2Vn Va; Bc	Ja nicht auf das Fest	Mt 26:5	
4c	6	Ev			C major → A minor	common time	Bc	Da nun Jesus war zu Bethanien	Mt 26:6–8a	
4d	7	Ch I			A minor → D minor	common time	2Ft 2Ob; 2Vn Va; Bc	Wozu dienet dieser Unrat	Mt 26:8b–9	
4e	8	Ev, Jesus			B♭ major → E minor	common time	2Vn Va; Bc	Da das Jesus merkete	Mt 26:10–13	
5	9		Rec A		B minor → F♯ minor	common time	2Ft; Bc	Du lieber Heiland du	Salomo Franck	
6	10		Aria A		F♯ minor	3/8	2Ft; Bc	Buß und Reu	Picander	
7	11	Ev, Judas			D major → B minor	common time	Bc	Da ging hin der Zwölfen einer	Mt 26:14–16	
8	12		Aria S		B minor	common time	2Ft; 2Vn Va; Bc	Blute nur, du liebes Herz!	Picander	
9a	13	Ev			G major	common time	Bc	Aber am ersten Tage der süßen Brot	Mt 26:17a	
9b	14	Ch I			G major	3/4	2Ft 2Ob; 2Vn Va; Bc	Wo willst du, daß wir dir bereiten	Mt 26:17b	
9c	15	Ev, Jesus			G major → C major	common time	2Vn Va; Bc	Er sprach: Gehet hin in die Stadt	Mt 26:18–21	
9d	15	Ev			B♭ minor → F minor	common time	Bc	Und sie wurden sehr betrübt	Mt 26:22a	
9e	15	Ch I			F minor → C minor	common time	2Ft 2Ob; 2Vn Va; Bc	Herr, bin ich's?	Mt 26:22b	
10	16		Chorale		A♭ major	common time	2Ob; 2Vn Va; Bc	Ich bin's, ich sollte büßen	Paul Gerhardt	
11	17	Ev, Jesus, Judas			F minor → G major	–6/4	2Vn Va; Bc	Er antwortete und sprach	Mt 26:23–29	
12	18		Rec S		E minor → C major	common time	2Oa; Bc	Wiewohl mein Herz in Tränen schwimmt	Picander	
13	19		Aria S		G major	6/8	2Oa; Bc	Ich will dir mein Herze schenken	Picander	
14	20	Ev, Jesus			B minor → E major	common time	2Vn Va; Bc	Und da sie den Lobgesang gesprochen hatten	Mt 26:30–32	
15	21		Chorale		E major	common time	2Ft 2Ob; 2Vn Va; Bc	Erkenne mich, mein Hüter	Paul Gerhardt	
16	22	Ev, Jesus, Peter			A major → G minor	common time	2Vn Va; Bc	Petrus aber antwortete	Mt 26:33–35	
17	23		Chorale		E♭ major	common time	2Ob; 2Vn Va; Bc	Ich will hier bei dir stehen	Paul Gerhardt	
18	24	Ev, Jesus			F major → A♭ major	common time	2Vn Va; Bc	Da kam Jesus mit ihnen zu einem Hofe	Mt 26:36–38	
19	25		Rec T	Ch II Chorale	F minor → G major	common time	2Fl 2Oc; 2Vn Va; Bc	O Schmerz! Hier zittert das gequälte Herz	Picander + Johann Heermann	
20	26		Aria T	Ch II	C minor	common time	2Ft Ob; 2Vn Va; Bc	Ich will bei meinem Jesu wachen	Picander	
21	27	Ev, Jesus			B major → G minor	common time	2Vn Va; Bc	Und ging hin ein wenig	Mt 26:39	
22	28		Rec B		D minor → B♭ major	common time	2Vn Va; Bc	Der Heiland fällt vor seinem Vater nieder	Picander	
23	29		Aria B		G minor	3/8	2Vn; Bc	Gerne will ich mich bequemen	Picander	
24	30	Ev, Jesus			F major → B minor	common time	2Vn Va; Bc	Und er kam zu seinen Jüngern	Mt 26:40–42	
25	31		Chorale		B minor	common time	2Ft 2Ob; 2Vn Va; Bc	Was mein Gott will, das g'scheh allzeit	Albert, Duke of Prussia	
26	32	Ev, Jesus, Judas			D major → G major	common time	2Vn Va; Bc	Und er kam und fand sie aber schlafend	Mt 26:43–50	
27a	33		Aria S A	Ch II	E minor	common time	2Ft 2Ob; 2Vn Va; Bc	So ist mein Jesus nun gefangen	Picander	
27b	33		Ch I	Ch II	E minor	3/8	2Ft 2Ob; 2Vn Va; Bc	Sind Blitze, sind Donner in Wolken verschwunden?	Barthold Heinrich Brockes	
28	34	Ev, Jesus			F♯ major → C♯ minor	common time	2Vn Va; Bc	Und siehe, einer aus denen	Mt 26:51–56	
29	35		Chorale fantasia		E major	common time	2Ft 2Oa; 2Vn Va; Bc	O Mensch, bewein dein Sünde groß	Sebald Heyden	

Structure of St Matthew Passion, Part II
NBA	BWV	Form			Key	Time	Instr.	Beginning of Text	Source	Incipit
30	36		Aria A	Ch II	B minor	3/8	Ft Oa; 2Vn Va; Bc	Ach! nun ist mein Jesus hin!	Picander	
31	37	Ev			B major → D minor	common time	Bc	Die aber Jesum gegriffen hatten	Mt 26:57–60a	
32	38		Chorale		B♭ major	common time	2Ft 2Ob; 2Vn Va; Bc	Mir hat die Welt trüglich gericht'	Adam Reusner	
33	39	Ev, 2 witnesses, high priest			G minor	common time	Bc	Und wiewohl viel falsche Zeugen herzutraten	Mt 26:60b–63a	
34	40		Rec T		A major → A minor	common time	2Ob; Vg; Bc	Mein Jesus schweigt	Picander	
35	41		Aria T		A minor	common time	Vg; Bc	Geduld! Wenn mich falsche Zungen stechen	Picander	
36a	42	Ev, Jesus, high priest			E minor	common time	2Vn Va; Bc	Und der Hohepriester antwortete	Mt 26:63b–66a	
36b	42	Ch I		Ch II	G major	common time	2Ft 2Ob; 2Vn Va; Bc	Er ist des Todes schuldig!	Mt 26:66b	
36c	43	Ev			C major → D minor	common time	Bc	Da speieten sie aus	Mt 26:67	
36d	43	Ch I		Ch II	D minor → F major	common time	2Ft 2Ob; 2Vn Va; Bc	Weissage uns, Christe	Mt 26:68	
37	44		Chorale		F major	common time	2Ft 2Ob; 2Vn Va; Bc	Wer hat dich so geschlagen	Paul Gerhardt	
38a	45	Ev, Peter, 2 maids			A major → D major	common time	Bc	Petrus aber saß draußen	Mt 26:69–73a	
38b	45	Ch II			D major → A major	common time	2Ft Ob; 2Vn Va; Bc	Wahrlich, du bist auch einer	Mt 26:73b	
38c	46	Ev, Peter			C♯ major → F♯ minor	common time	Bc	Da hub er an, sich zu verfluchen	Mt 26:74–75	
39	47		Aria A		B minor	12/8	Vs 2Vn Va; Bc	Erbarme dich	Picander	
40	48		Chorale		F♯ minor → A major	common time	2Ft 2Ob; 2Vn Va; Bc	Bin ich gleich von dir gewichen	Johann Rist	
41a	49	Ev, Judas			F♯ minor → B major	common time	Bc	Des Morgens aber hielten alle Hohepriester	Mt 27:1–4a	
41b	49	Ch I		Ch II	B major → E minor	3/4	2Ft 2Ob; 2Vn Va; Bc	Was gehet uns das an?	Mt 27:4b	
41c	50	Ev, 2 high priests			A minor → B minor	common time	Bc	Und er warf die Silberlinge in den Tempel	Mt 27:5–6	
42	51		Aria B		G major	common time	Vs 2Vn Va; Bc	Gebt mir meinen Jesum wieder!	Picander	
43	52	Ev, Jesus, Pilate			E minor → D major	common time	2Vn Va; Bc	Sie hielten aber einen Rat	Mt 27:7–14	
44	53		Chorale		D major	common time	2Ft 2Ob; 2Vn Va; Bc	Befiehl du deine Wege	Paul Gerhardt	
45a	54	Ev, Pilate, his wife	Ch I	Ch II	E major → A minor	common time	Bc	Auf das Fest aber hatte der Landpfleger Gewohnheit	Mt 27:15–22a	
45b	54	Ch I & II			A minor → B major	common time	2Ft 2Ob; 2Vn Va; Bc	Laß ihn kreuzigen!	Mt 27:22b	
46	55		Chorale		B minor	common time	2Ft 2Ob; 2Vn Va; Bc	Wie wunderbarlich ist doch diese Strafe!	Johann Heermann	
47	56	Ev, Pilate			B minor	common time	Bc	Der Landpfleger sagte	Mt 27:23a	
48	57		Rec S		E minor → C major	common time	2Oc; Bc	Er hat uns allen wohlgetan	Picander	
49	58		Aria S		A minor	3/4	Ft 2Oc	Aus Liebe will mein Heiland sterben	Picander	
50a	59	Ev			E minor	common time	Bc	Sie schrieen aber noch mehr	Mt 27:23b	
50b	59	Ch I & II			B minor → C♯ major	common time	2Ft 2Ob; 2Vn Va; Bc	Laß ihn kreuzigen!	Mt 27:23c	
50c	59	Ev, Pilate			C♯ major → B minor	common time	Bc	Da aber Pilatus sahe	Mt 27:24–25a	
50d	59	Ch I & II			B minor → D major	common time	2Ft 2Ob; 2Vn Va; Bc	Sein Blut komme über uns	Mt 27:25b	
50e	59	Ev			D major → E minor	common time	Bc	Da gab er ihnen Barrabam los	Mt 27:26	
51	60		Rec A		F major → G minor	common time	2Vn Va; Bc	Erbarm es Gott!	Picander	
52	61		Aria A		G minor	3/4	2Vn; Bc	Können Tränen meiner Wangen	Picander	
53a	62	Ev			F major → D minor	common time	Bc	Da nahmen die Kriegsknechte	Mt 27:27–29a	
53b	62	Ch I		Ch II	D minor → A major	common time	2Ft 2Ob; 2Vn Va; Bc	Gegrüßet seist du, Jüdenkönig!	Mt 27:29b	
53c	62	Ev			D minor	common time	Bc	Und speieten ihn an	Mt 27:30	
54	63		Chorale		D minor → F major	common time	2Ft 2Ob; 2Vn Va; Bc	O Haupt voll Blut und Wunden	Paul Gerhardt	
55	64	Ev			A minor	common time	Bc	Und da sie ihn verspottet hatten	Mt 27:31–32	
56	65		Rec B		F major → D minor	common time	2Ft; Vg; Bc	Ja freilich will in uns	Picander	
57	66		Aria B		D minor	common time	Vg; Bc	Komm, süßes Kreuz	Picander	
58a	67	Ev			C major → F♯ major	common time	Bc	Und da sie an die Stätte kamen	Mt 27:33–39	
58b	67	Ch I		Ch II	F♯ major → B minor	common time	2Ft 2Ob; 2Vn Va; Bc	Der du den Tempel Gottes zerbrichst	Mt 27:40	
58c	67	Ev			F♯ major → E minor	common time	Bc	Desgleichen auch die Hohenpriester	Mt 27:41	
58d	67	Ch I		Ch II	E minor	common time	2Ft 2Ob; 2Vn Va; Bc	Andern hat er geholfen	Mt 27:42–43	
58e	68	Ev			G major → C minor	common time	Bc	Desgleichen schmäheten ihn	Mt 27:44	
59	69		Rec A		A♭ major	common time	2Oc; Bc	Ach Golgatha	Picander	
60	70		Aria A	Ch II	E♭ major	common time	2Ob 2Oc; 2Vn Va; Bc	Sehet, Jesus hat die Hand	Picander	
61a	71	Ev, Jesus			E♭ major → C minor	common time	Bc	Und von der sechsten Stunde an	Mt 27:45–47a	
61b	71	Ch I			C minor → F major	common time	2Ob; 2Vn Va; Bc	Der rufet dem Elias!	Mt 27:47b	
61c	71	Ev			F major → G minor	common time	Bc	Und bald lief einer unter ihnen	Mt 27:48–49a	
61d	71	Ch II			G minor → D minor	common time	2Ft Ob; 2Vn Va; Bc	Halt! laß sehen	Mt 27:49b	
61e	71	Ev			D minor → A minor	common time	Bc	Aber Jesus schriee abermal laut	Mt 27:50	
62	72		Chorale		A minor	common time	2Ft 2Ob; 2Vn Va; Bc	Wenn ich einmal soll scheiden	Paul Gerhardt	
63a	73	Ev			C major → A♭ major	common time	Bc	Und siehe da, der Vorhang im Tempel zerriß	Mt 27:51–54a	
63b	73	Ch I & II			A♭ major	common time	2Ft Ob; 2Vn Va; Bc	Wahrlich, dieser ist Gottes Sohn gewesen	Mt 27:54b	
63c	73	Ev			E♭ major → B♭ major	common time	Bc	Und es waren viel Weiber da	Mt 27:55–59	
64	74		Rec B		G minor	common time	2Vn Va; Bc	Am Abend, da es kühle war	Salomo Franck	
65	75		Aria B		B♭ major	12/8	2Oc; 2Vn Va; Bc	Mache dich, mein Herze, rein	Picander	
66a	76	Ev			G minor → E♭ major	common time	Bc	Und Joseph nahm den Leib	Mt 27:59–62	
66b	76	Ch I		Ch II	E♭ major → D major	common time	2Ft 2Ob; 2Vn Va; Bc	Herr, wir haben gedacht	Mt 27:63–64	
66c	76	Ev, Pilate			G minor → E♭ major	common time	Bc	Pilatus sprach zu ihnen	Mt 27:65–66	
67	77		Rec S A T B	Ch II	E♭ major → C minor	common time	2Ft 2Ob; 2Vn Va; Bc	Nun ist der Herr zur Ruh gebracht	Picander	
68	78		Ch I	Ch II	C minor	3/4	2Ft 2Ob; 2Vn Va; Bc	Wir setzen uns mit Tränen nieder	Picander	

== Sources ==
- Matthäuspassion: Scores at the International Music Score Library Project
- Matthäuspassion, early edition (BWV 244b): Scores at the International Music Score Library Project
- St. Matthew passion BWV 244; BC D 3b / Passion Leipzig University
- Matthäus-Passion BWV 244 history, scoring, sources for text and music, translations to various languages, discography, discussion, bach-cantatas website
- Matthäuspassion history, scoring, Bach website (in German)
- BWV 244 Matthäus-Passion Sources, English translation, University of Vermont
- BWV 244 Matthäuspassion text, scoring, University of Alberta
- Tim Smith and Ben Kammin: The Chorales of Bach's St. Matthew Passion: their Sources and Dramatic Roles bach.nau.edu
