= Ich singe dir mit Herz und Mund =

- Hymn by Paul Gerhardt
- English: I sing to you with heart and mouth
- Text: by Paul Gerhardt
- Language: German
- Published: 1653

"Ich singe dir mit Herz und Mund" (I sing to you with heart and mouth) is a hymn with a text by Paul Gerhardt. It was first published in 1653 in the 5th edition of Johann Crüger's hymnal Praxis pietatis melica. In the current Protestant hymnal, Evangelisches Gesangbuch, it appears as EG 324.

A first translation to English, "O Lord! I sing with mouth and heart", appeared in 1867 in J. Kelly's P.G's Spiritual Songs on page 255.

== Bibliography ==
- Möller, Christian (ed.), Ich singe dir mit Herz und Mund. Liedauslegungen – Liedmeditationen – Liedpredigten. Ein Arbeitsbuch zum Evangelischen Gesangbuch, Stuttgart 1997, ISBN 3-7668-3525-4
- Thost, Karl Christian, Bibliographie über die Lieder des Evangelischen Gesangbuchs, Göttingen 2006, ISBN 3-525-50336-9
