= O Welt, sieh hier dein Leben =

Sacred Song

- Lutheran Passion hymn
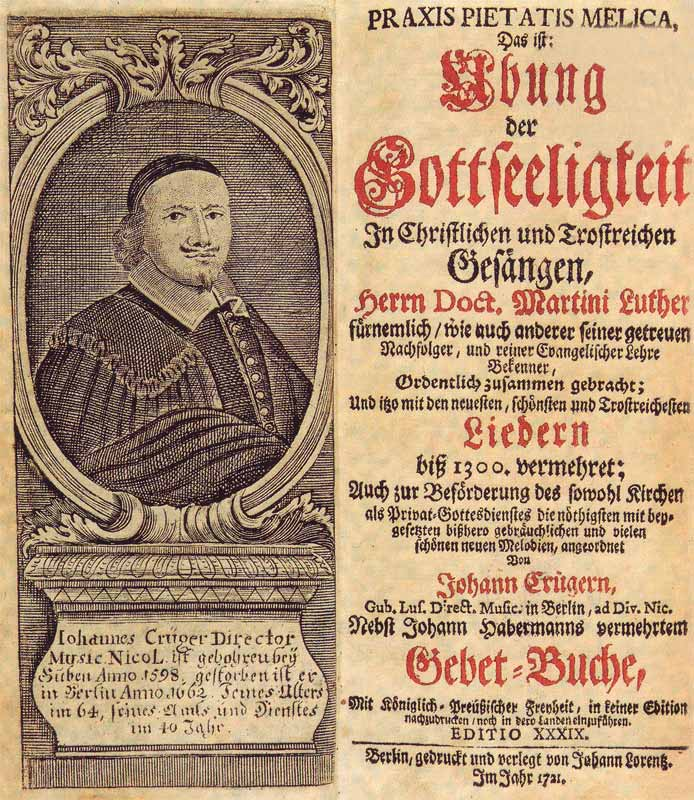
- Title page of the hymnal Praxis pietatis melica
- English: "O, World! behold upon the tree"
- Catalogue: Zahn 2293
- Genre: Hymn on the tune "O Welt, ich muss dich lassen"
- Text: by Paul Gerhardt
- Language: German
- Based on: Martin Moller: Soliloquia de passione
- Published: 1647 in Praxis pietatis melica

"O Welt, sieh hier dein Leben" (literally: O world, see here your life) is a Lutheran Passion hymn in German by Paul Gerhardt. In 16 stanzas of 6 lines, it was first published in 1647 in Johann Crüger's Praxis pietatis melica. The hymn is known as the source for chorales in Bach's Passions. It was translated to English in several versions, for example "O, World! behold upon the tree" by Catherine Winkworth in 1858.

== Text and tune ==
Gerhardt wrote the hymn for Passiontide in 16 stanzas of 6 lines each to the melody of "O Welt, ich muß dich lassen", which is taken from the earlier secular "Innsbruck, ich muss dich lassen" attributed to Heinrich Isaac. The tune requires the poetic form AABCCB. Gerhardt also wrote the evening song "Nun ruhen alle Wälder" to the same melody, Zahn No. 2293.

Gerhardt based his work on a meditation on the Passion by Martin Moller, part of his 1587 Soliloquia de passione. The theme is a reflection what the suffering of Jesus means for the Christian. Starting with the image of Jesus on the cross, life and death are juxtaposed, "Leben" (life) at the end of the first line, "Tod" (death) at the end of the third line. Another contrast is that of "Der große Fürst der Ehren" (the great duke of honours) and his humiliation: "mit Schlägen, Hohn und großem Spott" (with beatings, scorn and great mockery). The third stanza raises the question of responsibility, "Wer hat dich so geschlagen ...?" (Who beat you like this ...?), while the fourth stanza answers that it is the one who asks: "Ich, ich und meine Sünden" (I and my sins). The fifth stanza draws the consequence: "Ich bin's, ich sollte büßen" (It's me, I should atone). The following stanzas develop the resolution to follow the example of loving the enemies ("ich die soll lieben, die mich doch sehr betrüben", 13), forgive ("Dem Nächsten seine Schulden verzeihen", 14), deny worldly pleasures ("dem absagen, was meinem Fleisch gelüst", 15) and finally hope for help to eternal rest ("begleiten zu der ew'gen Ruh", 16).

The hymn was first published in 1647 in Johann Crüger's Praxis pietatis melica., in Berlin. It was translated to English in several versions, for example "O, World! behold upon the tree" by Catherine Winkworth in 1858. A slightly more modern rendering, shortened and paraphrased, is "The duteous day now closeth" by Robert Bridges, in which version the hymn appears in the English Hymnal and Hymns Ancient and Modern. In the current German hymnal Evangelisches Gesangbuch (EG) it is number 84.

== Music ==
Christoph Graupner composed a church cantata for Good Friday (GWV 1127/19) for four voices SATB, strings and basso continuo. Felix Mendelssohn used the hymn to conclude a Passion section in his unfinished oratorio Christus.

=== Bach Passions ===
Johann Sebastian Bach used several stanzas of the hymn as reflecting chorales in his St John Passion (1724) and St Matthew Passion (1727). In the earlier work, Bach inserted two stanzas, 3 and 4 in the same harmonization, as movement 11 (in the Neue Bach-Ausgabe), after Jesus asks the one who beat him for justification. Stanza 3 asks, "Wer hat dich so geschlagen" (Who hath thee now so stricken), and stanza 4 answers, "Ich, ich und meine Sünden" (I, I and my transgressions), highlighting the personal responsibility of the speaking sinner for the suffering of Jesus. In the St Matthew Passion, two stanzas appear in different harmonization in different situations of the drama, as movements 10 and 37 (in the NBA). A question is part of Gospel, the disciples, being told that one of them will betray Jesus, ask "Herr, bin ich's?" (Lord, is it me?). Before the answer from the Gospel, stanza 5 of the hymn picks the wording up in an answer, "Ich bin's, ich sollte büßen" (I should atone), which asks the listener to identify with that penitent position. Stanza 3, "Wer hat dich so geschlagen", appears here after the beating of Jesus during the court hearing.
