= Dem Gerechten muß das Licht, BWV 195 =

Church cantata by Johann Sebastian Bach

Dem Gerechten muß das Licht
- BWV 195
- Sacred cantata by J. S. Bach
- Occasion: Wedding
- Chorale: "Nun danket all und bringet Ehr"
- Vocal: SATB choir; soprano and bass soloiists
- Instrumental: 3 trumpets; timpani; 2 horns; 2 flauti traversi; 2 oboes; 2 oboes d'amore; 2 violins; viola; violone; continuo

Dem Gerechten muß das Licht (The light shall [ever rise again] for the righteous), BWV 195, (Note: "BWV" is Bach-Werke-Verzeichnis, a thematic catalogue of Bach's works.) is a church cantata by Johann Sebastian Bach for a wedding. He composed it in Leipzig, possibly in 1727, but only the incomplete scores of later performances from the 1740s survived. It uses two verses from Psalm 97 for the opening movement, and the first stanza auf Paul Gerhardt's hymn "Nun danket all und bringet Ehr" for the closing chorale. The librettist of the other movements is unknown.

== History and text ==
Bach composed this cantata in Leipzig around 1727 for a wedding. The earliest version of the work is lost; an incomplete second version from 1742 and a complete revision from the late 1740s survive. These dates correspond with repeat performances of the work.

The closing chorale is the first stanza of Paul Gerhardt's hymn "Nun danket all und bringet Ehr", with the melody of "Lobt Gott, ihr Christen alle gleich". The opening movement is based on Psalms 97:11-12; the rest of the text is anonymous. Alfred Dürr derives from allusions in the text that the work was intended for the wedding of a lawyer.

== Scoring and structure ==
The cantata is scored for soprano and bass vocal soloists, a four-part choir, three trumpets, timpani, two horns, two flutes, two oboes, two oboes d'amore, two violins, viola, violone, basso continuo.

The work is divided into two parts, to be performed before and after the sermon. The original version had three movements in the second part, out of eight total. In the surviving version, the second part includes only the final of six movements.

1. Chorus: Dem Gerechten muss das Licht immer wieder aufgehen
2. Recitative (bass): Dem Freudenlicht gerechter Frommen
3. Aria (bass): Rühmet Gottes Güt und Treu
4. Recitative (soprano): Wohlan, so knüpfet denn ein Band
5. Chorus: Wir kommen, deine Heiligkeit
6. Chorale: Nun danket all und bringet Ehr

== Music ==
The cantata opens with a choral movement which combines two fugues, each on a psalm verse, with concertante parts. The vocal scoring indicates a ripieno group at times. The movement has an "energetic and ebullient" instrumental introduction. The first section highlights the contrast between ripieno and full chorus, while the second section is dance-like.

The bass recitative is secco and "severe". It is accompanied by a triplet line that moves in semiquavers to end the movement.

The bass aria is in modified ternary form and includes an instrumental ritornello with a characteristic Scotch snap. The middle section moves into a minor key to increase the intimacy of the personal expression. The movement concludes with a short coda.

The soprano recitative "is a musical portrayal of the central part of the marriage ceremony" – the blessing of the union. It is accompanied by chordal oboes and scalar flutes.

The penultimate movement is a chorus, similar to that with which the cantata opened. It combines da capo and ritornello form. The first section is dominated by scalar motifs, while the middle section is chordal and "quasi-philosophical".

The cantata ends with a four-part harmonization of the chorale tune, "Lobt Gott, ihr Christen alle gleich".

== Recordings ==
- Gächinger Kantorei, Württembergisches Kammerorchester Heilbronn, Helmuth Rilling. Die Bach Kantate Vol. 8. Hänssler, 1984.
- Holland Boys Choir, Netherlands Bach Collegium, Pieter Jan Leusink. Bach Edition Vol. 18. Brilliant Classics, 2000.
- Amsterdam Baroque Orchestra & Choir, Ton Koopman. J. S. Bach: Complete Cantatas Vol. 21. Antoine Marchand, 2002.
- Bach Collegium Japan, Masaaki Suzuki. J. S. Bach: Cantatas Vol. 51. BIS, 2011.
