= Praxis pietatis melica =

17th century Protestant hymnal

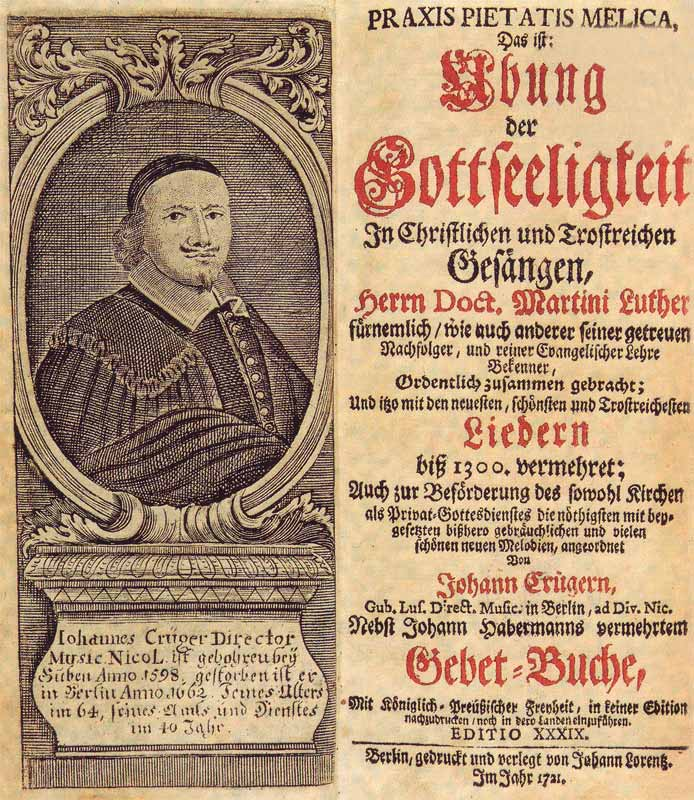
- Title page of the 39th edition, 1721
- Editor: Johann Crüger
- Language: German
- Genre: Hymnal
- Published: 1640 to 1737

Praxis pietatis melica (Practice of Piety in Song) is a Protestant hymnal first published in the 17th century by Johann Crüger. The hymnal, which appeared under this title from 1647 to 1737 in 45 editions, has been described as "the most successful and widely-known Lutheran hymnal of the 17th century". Crüger composed melodies to texts that were published in the hymnal and are still sung today, including "Jesu, meine Freude", "Herzliebster Jesu", and "Nun danket alle Gott". Between 1647 and 1661, Crüger first printed 90 songs by his friend Paul Gerhardt, including "O Haupt voll Blut und Wunden".

== Purpose ==
The volume of hymns was intended for use in both church and private services. The explanation of the Latin title was given from the very first publication in 1647: "Das ist: Vbung der Gottseligkeit in Christlichen und Trostreichen Gesängen" (That is: practice of Godliness in Christian and comforting chants). The subtitle continued: "Herrn D. Martini Lutheri fürnemlich / und denn auch anderer vornehmer und gelehrter Leute. Ordentlich zusammen gebracht" (mostly by Martin Luther / and other distinguished and learned people. Collected meticulously). Subsequent text on the title page varied between editions, and could include the number of hymns in the volume—the fifth edition stated it had 500 hymns, while the penultimate 44th edition contained 1316.

== History ==
Crüger was appointed Kantor at the Nikolaikirche in Berlin in 1622, a post he held until his death in 1662. In 1640, he published a collection of 240 hymn texts and melodies as Newes vollkömliches Gesangbuch (New complete song book), which contained core songs of the Reformation, especially by Martin Luther, and 18 new melodies composed by Crüger, mostly to texts by Johann Heermann. In 1643, Crüger met Paul Gerhardt, who had taken up a position as a tutor in Berlin. Crüger wrote melodies and choral settings for many of Gerhardt's songs. In 1647, Crüger published a second volume of hymns, titled Praxis pietatis melica. Its 383 texts and 170 melodies included those published in 1640; among the new material was the first publication of 18 texts by Gerhardt. The volume's title was derived from the title of a book by Lewis Bayley, The Practice of Piety, which had been translated to German in 1631. By the fifth edition in 1653, the number of hymns had increased to 500, and 82 of these were on Gerhardt's texts. It also contained "Schmücke dich, o liebe Seele", a communion hymn on lyrics by Johann Franck with a melody by Crüger. The tenth edition in 1661, the last one compiled by Crüger, had 550 hymns in all, and a total of 90 by Gerhardt.

The hymnal continued being published through 1737, when its 45th and final edition was printed; for much of its existence, it had the widest distribution in German-speaking lands of any Protestant hymnal. Several of its songs are still in use, including "Jesu, meine Freude" (text by Johann Franck), "Nun danket alle Gott" (by Martin Rinkart), and "Herzliebster Jesu" (by Johann Heermann).

The term praxis pietatis led to naming the later movement pietism.

== Hymns by Gerhardt ==
1647

The edition contained 18 hymns by Paul Gerhardt, including:

- "Ein Lämmlein geht und trägt die Schuld"
- "Ich hab in Gottes Herz und Sinn"
- "Nun danket all und bringet Ehr"
- "Nun ruhen alle Wälder"
- "O Welt, sieh hier dein Leben"

1653

A hymnal was commissioned by Luise Henriette of Brandenburg. It contained 17 of the 18 hymns from the first edition and 20 additional hymns, including:

- "Ich singe dir mit Herz und Mund"
- "Wie soll ich dich empfangen"

The same year, the fifth edition contained the 18 and 20 hymns as described above, and additional 44 hymns, including:

- "Befiehl du deine Wege"
- "Fröhlich soll mein Herze springen"
- "Geh aus, mein Herz, und suche Freud"
- "Ich steh an deiner Krippen hier"
- "Lobet den Herren alle, die ihn ehren"
- "Sollt ich meinem Gott nicht singen?"
- "Warum sollt ich mich denn grämen"

1656

A sixth edition, printed in Frankfurt, added three new hymns, including:

- "O Haupt voll Blut und Wunden"

== Literature ==
- Johann Friedrich Bachmann: Paul Gerhardt. Ein Vortrag im Evangelischen Verein für kirchliche Zwecke gehalten. Nebst einem Anhange über die ersten Ausgaben der Praxis Pietatis Melica von Johann Crüger, sammt 18 darin enthaltenen Liedern P. Gerhardts. Schlawitz, Berlin 1863 (Digitalisat at Google Books).
- Johann Friedrich Bachmann: Paulus Gerhardts geistliche Lieder: historisch-kritische Ausgabe. Oehmigke, Berlin 1866 (Digitalisat at Google Books).
- Wilhelm Bode: Die Kirchenmelodien Johann Crüger's. In: Monatshefte für Musikgeschichte, vol. 5. Breitkopf und Haertel, Leipzig 1871, p. 57–60, 65–83 (, p. 57, at Google Books).
- Christian Bunners: Johann Crüger (1598–1662): Berliner Musiker und Kantor, lutherischer Lied- und Gesangbuchschöpfer. Frank & Timme, Berlin 2012, ISBN 978-3-86596-371-0 (, p. 36, at Google Books).
- Emanuel Christian Gottlob Langbecker (ed.): Johann Crüger's Choral-Melodien: aus den besten Quellen streng nach dem Original mitgetheilt, und mit einem kurzen Abrisse des Lebens und Wirkens dieses geistlichen Lieder-Componisten begleitet. Eichler, Berlin 1835
- Joachim Stalmann: Crüger, Johann. In: Wolfgang Herbst (Herbst): Wer ist wer im Gesangbuch? Vandenhoeck & Ruprecht, Göttingen 2001, ISBN 3-525-50323-7, p. 66ff (, p. 66, at Google Books)

== See also ==
- List of hymns by Martin Luther
