= Lewis Bayly =

Lewis Bayly may refer to:

- Lewis Bayly (bishop)
- Lewis Bayly (Royal Navy officer)
