= O Sacred Head, Now Wounded =

Christian Passion hymn

"O Haupt voll Blut und Wunden" "O Sacred Head, Now Wounded"
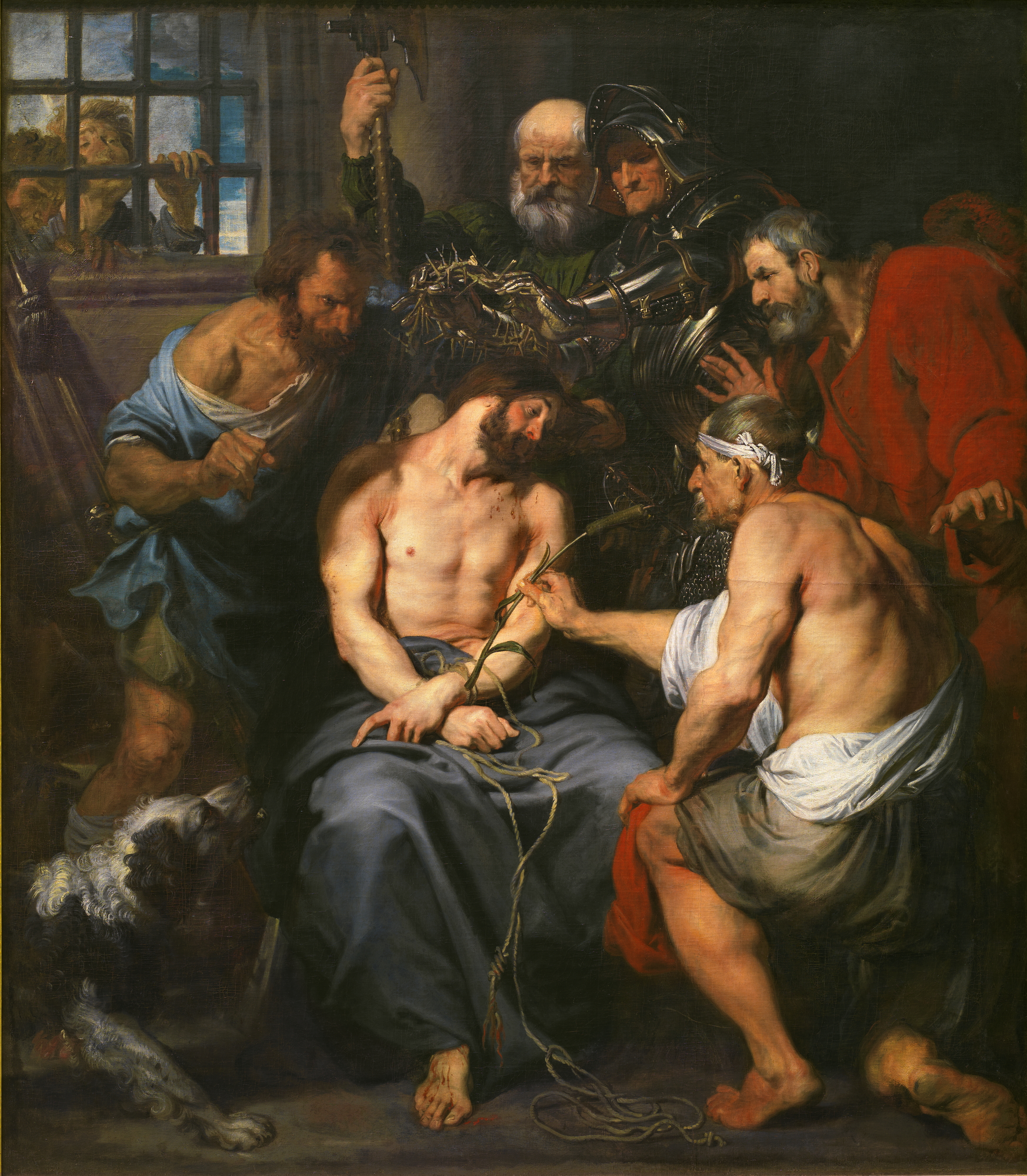
- Christ Crowned with Thorns (1620) by Anthony van Dyck
- Genre: Hymn
- Text: Attributed to Bernard of Clairvaux, translated by Paul Gerhardt and James Waddel Alexander
- Based on: John 19:2
- Meter: 7.6.7.6 D
- Melody: "Passion Chorale" by Hans Leo Hassler, harmonized by Johann Sebastian Bach

"O Sacred Head, Now Wounded" is a Christian Passion hymn based on a Latin text written during the Middle Ages. Paul Gerhardt wrote a German version which is known by its incipit, "O Haupt voll Blut und Wunden".

== Text ==
=== Original Latin ===
The hymn is based on a long medieval Latin poem, Salve mundi salutare, with stanzas addressing the various parts of Christ's body hanging on the Cross. The last part of the poem, from which the hymn is taken, is addressed to Christ's head, and begins "Salve caput cruentatum". The poem is often attributed to Bernard of Clairvaux (1091–1153), but is now attributed to the medieval poet Arnulf of Leuven (died 1250). A selection of stanzas from the seven cantos were used for the text of Dieterich Buxtehude's Membra Jesu Nostri addressing the various members of the crucified body

- the feet
- the knees
- the hands
- the pierced side
- the breast
- the heart
- the face

=== German translation ===
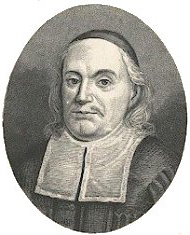
Paul Gerhardt

The poem was translated into German by the Lutheran hymnist Paul Gerhardt (1607–1676). He reworked the Latin version to suggest a more personal contemplation of the events of Christ's death on the cross. It first appeared in Johann Crüger's hymnal Praxis pietatis melica in 1656. Although Gerhardt translated the whole poem, it is the closing section which has become best known, and is sung as a hymn in its own right. The German hymn begins with "O Haupt voll Blut und Wunden".

=== English translation ===
The hymn was first translated into English in 1752 by John Gambold (1711–1771), an Anglican vicar in Oxfordshire. His translation begins, "O Head so full of bruises". In 1830 a new translation of the hymn was made by an American Presbyterian minister, James Waddel Alexander (1804–1859). Alexander's translation, beginning "O sacred head, now wounded", became one of the most widely used in 19th- and 20th-century hymnals.

Another English translation, based on the German, was made in 1861 by Sir Henry Williams Baker. Published in Hymns Ancient and Modern, it begins, "O sacred head surrounded by crown of piercing thorn".

Catherine Winkworth also translated the text and published it in her 1855 collection of German hymns, Lyra Germanica, giving it the title Ah wounded Head! Must Thou.

In 1899 the English poet Robert Bridges (1844–1930) made a fresh translation from the original Latin, beginning "O sacred Head, sore wounded, defiled and put to scorn". This is the version used in the 1940 Hymnal (Episcopal), the 1982 Hymnal (Episcopal; stanzas 1–3 and 5), and the New English Hymnal (1986) and several other late 20th-century hymn books.

The English Hymnal (1906) has a translation attributed to "Y.H.", referring to Bridges' translations for the Yattendon Hymnal, of which he was the editor.

Karen Lynn Davidson (born 1943) wrote another English translation, titled "O savior, thou who wearest a crown", which is published in Hymns of The Church of Jesus Christ of Latter-day Saints. This is an edited version, including parts based on 2 Nephi from the Book of Mormon.

== Melody and use ==
The melody as it appears in movement 54 of the St Matthew Passion by Bach:

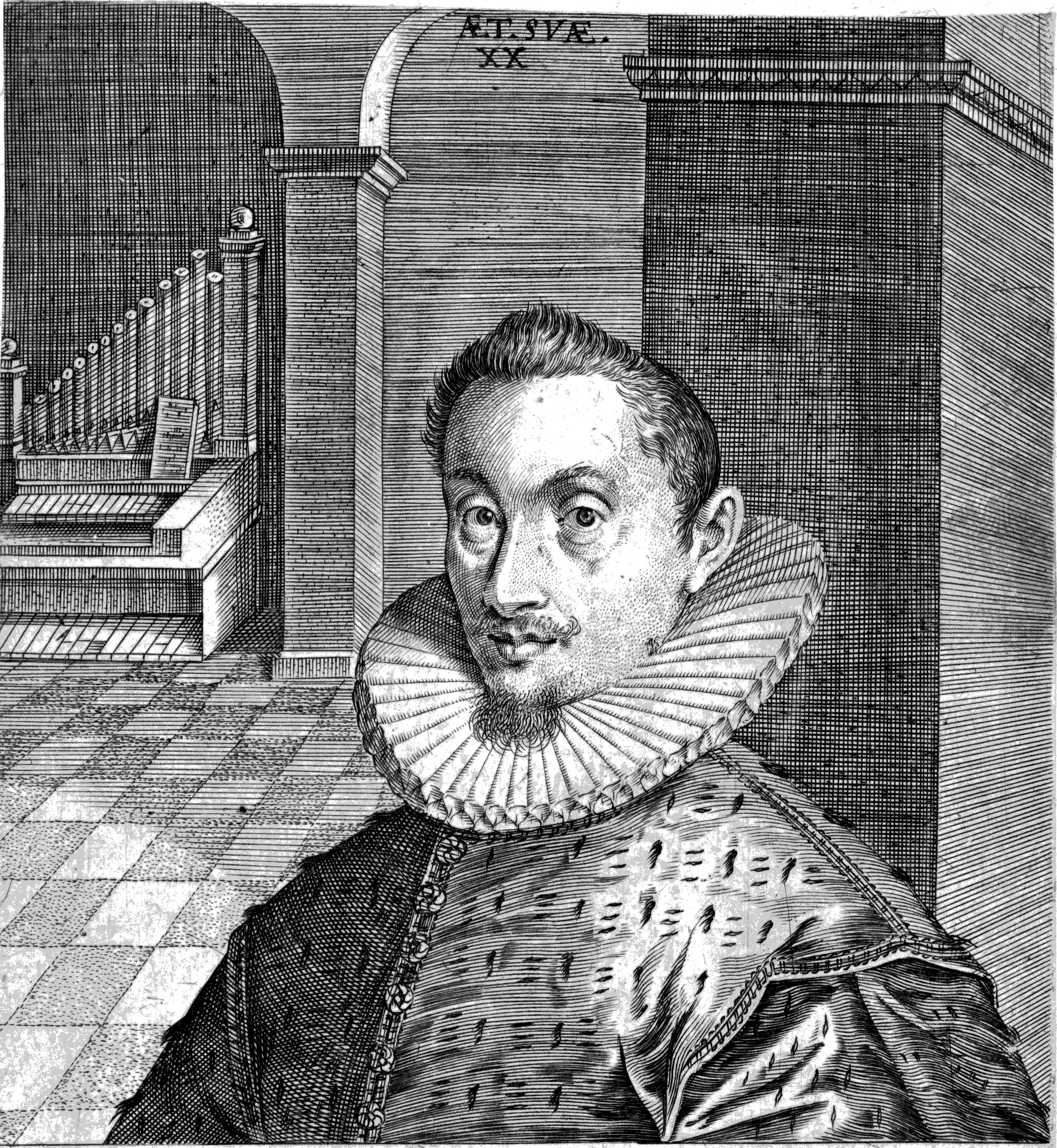
Hans Leo Hassler

The music for the German and English versions of the hymn is by Hans Leo Hassler, written around 1600 for a secular love song, "Mein G'müt ist mir verwirret", which first appeared in print in the 1601 Lustgarten Neuer Teutscher Gesäng. The tune was appropriated and rhythmically simplified for Gerhardt's German hymn in 1656 by Johann Crüger. Johann Sebastian Bach arranged the melody and used five stanzas of the hymn in four different settings in his St Matthew Passion. He also used the hymn's text and melody in the second movement of the cantata Sehet, wir gehn hinauf gen Jerusalem, BWV 159. Bach used the melody on different words in his Christmas Oratorio, in Part I (no. 5) and Part VI (no. 64). Bach also craftily employed the melody as a counterpoint in half-time in the opening aria of the cantata Komm, du süße Todesstunde, BWV 161, and set it for four parts to close that cantata. Franz Liszt included an arrangement of this hymn in the sixth station, Saint Veronica, of his Via crucis (Stations of the Cross), S. 504a. The Danish composer Rued Langgaard composed a set of variations for string quartet on this tune. It is also employed in the final chorus of "Sinfonia Sacra", the Ninth Symphony of the English composer Edmund Rubbra. Mauricio Kagel quoted the hymn at the end of his oratorio Sankt-Bach-Passion telling Bach's life, composed for the tricentenary of Bach's birth in 1985.

=== Other uses ===
Other hymns have also been written to the tune. These include:

- "We come as guests invited" by Timothy Dudley-Smith
- "O King of Might and Splendour", by Dom Gregory Murray

The tune has also been used for secular texts and songs, including:

- "Because All Men Are Brothers", a protest song written in 1947 by Tom Glazer
- "American Tune" by Paul Simon
- "Stop Error" by John K. Samson

== German and English lyrics ==
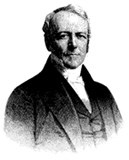
James Waddell Alexander

The text by Gerhardt consists of 10 verses, of which the first and final one are transcribed below, with the same verses in the 1830 version by J. W. Alexander.

O Haupt voll Blut und Wunden,
voll Schmerz und voller Hohn,
o Haupt, zum Spott gebunden
mit einer Dornenkron;
o Haupt, sonst schön gezieret
mit höchster Ehr und Zier,
jetzt aber höchst schimpfieret:
gegrüßet sei'st du mir!

Erscheine mir zum Schilde,
zum Trost in meinem Tod,
und laß mich sehn dein Bilde
in deiner Kreuzesnot.
Da will ich nach dir blicken,
da will ich glaubensvoll
dich fest an mein Herz drücken.
Wer so stirbt, der stirbt wohl.

O sacred Head, now wounded,
with grief and shame weighed down,
now scornfully surrounded
with thorns, Thine only crown;
O sacred Head, what glory,
what bliss till now was Thine!
Yet, though despised and gory,
I joy to call Thee mine.

Be Thou my consolation,
my shield when I must die;
remind me of Thy passion
when my last hour draws nigh.
Mine eyes shall then behold Thee,
upon Thy cross shall dwell,
my heart by faith enfolds Thee.
Who dieth thus dies well.
