= Paul Gerhardt =

German Lutheran theologian and hymn writer (1607–1676)

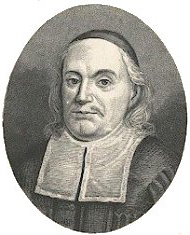
- Born: 12 March 1607; Gräfenhainichen, Electorate of Saxony in the Holy Roman Empire
- Died: 27 May 1676 (aged 69); Lübben, Duchy of Saxe-Merseburg in the Holy Roman Empire
- Occupations: Theologian; Lutheran pastor; Hymn writer

Paulus or Paul Gerhardt (12 March 1607 – 27 May 1676) was a German theologian, Lutheran pastor and hymnodist, considered Germany's greatest hymn writer. His songs and hymns were published in contemporary hymnals such as Praxis pietatis melica, and are still part of modern hymnals. Hymn stanzas by him feature prominently in Bach's Passions and the Christmas Oratorio.

== Biography ==
Gerhardt was born into a middle-class family at Gräfenhainichen, a small town between Halle and Wittenberg. His father died in 1619, his mother in 1621. At the age of fifteen, he entered the Fürstenschule in Grimma. The school was known for its pious atmosphere and stern discipline. The school almost closed in 1626 when the plague came to Grimma, but Paul remained and graduated from there in 1627. In January 1628 he enrolled in the University of Wittenberg. There, two teachers in particular had an influence on him: Paul Röber and Jacob Martini. Both of these men were staunch Lutherans, promoting its teachings not only in the classroom but in sermons and hymns. Röber in particular often took his sermon texts from hymns. In this way Gerhardt was taught the use of hymnody as a tool of pastoral care and instruction.

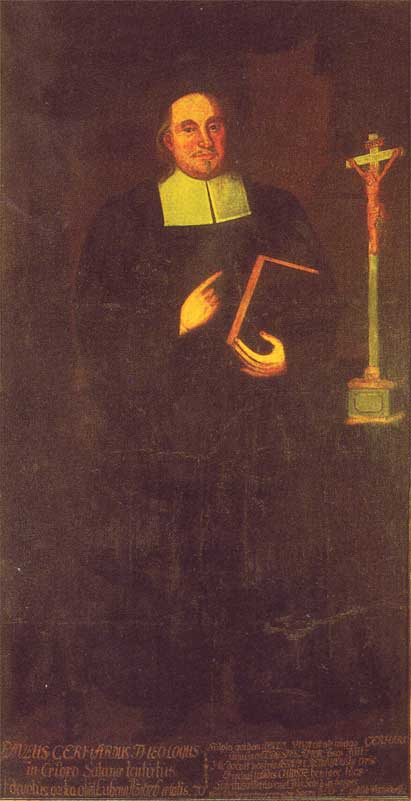
Paul Gerhardt, posthumous portrait c. 1700 from the church in Lübben (Spreewald)

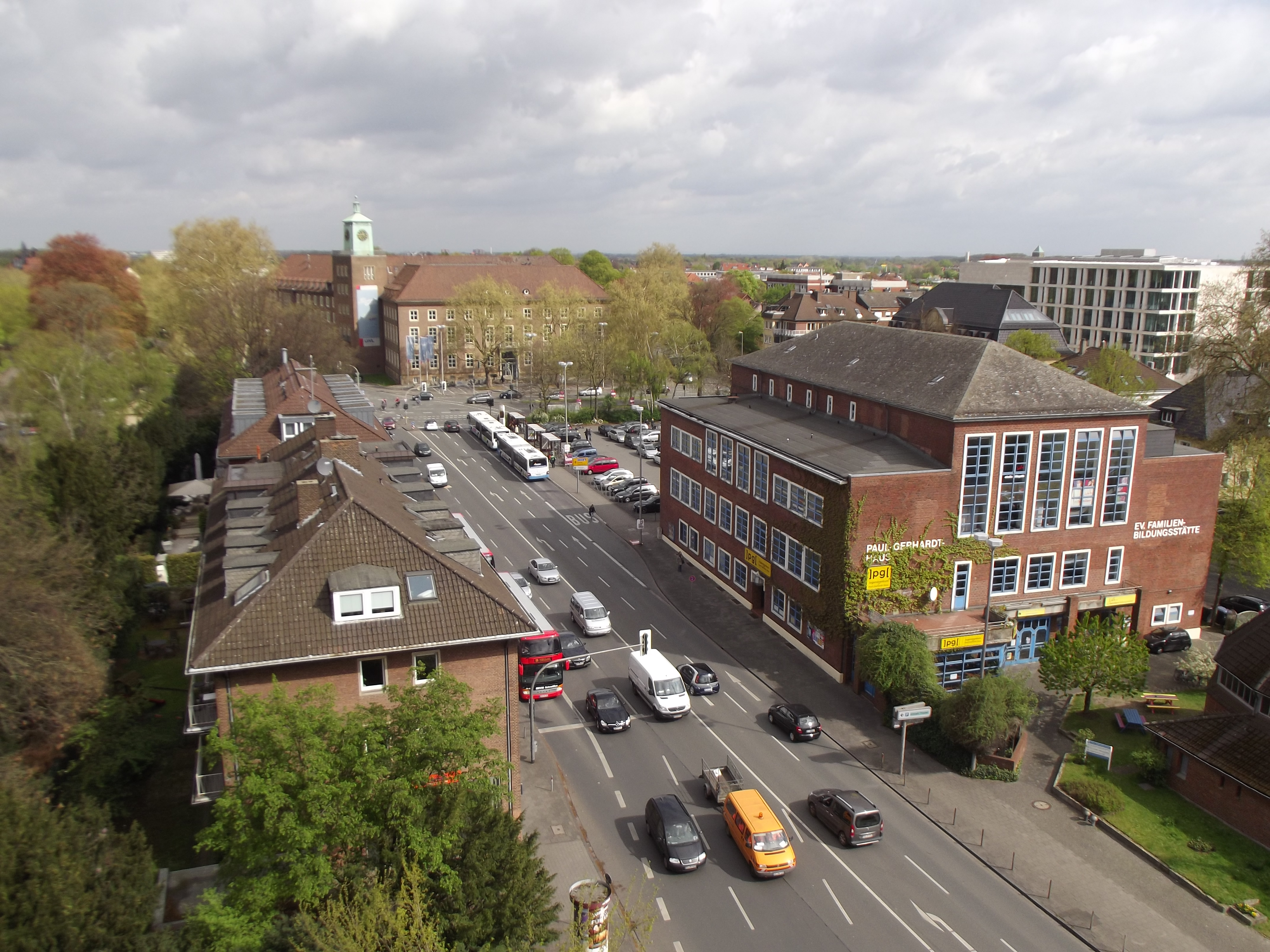
The Paul Gerhardt Building in the heart of Münster.

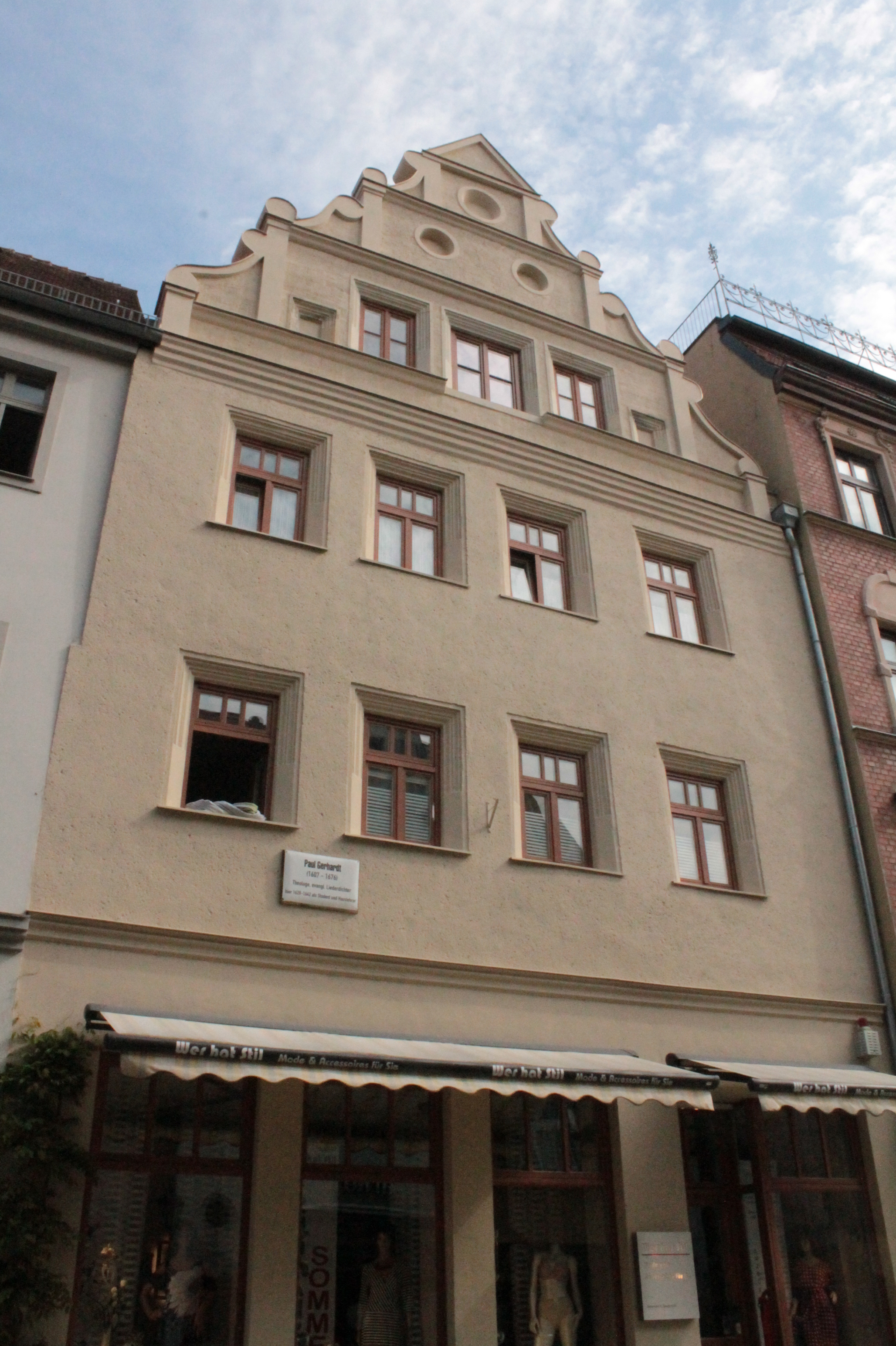
Paul Gerhardt's house, Collegienstraße, Wittenberg

Gerhardt graduated from the University of Wittenberg around 1642. Due to the troubles of the Thirty Years' War it seems he was not immediately placed as a pastor, and thus moved to Berlin where he worked as tutor in the family of an advocate named Andreas Barthold. During his time in Berlin his hymns and poems brought him to the attention of Johann Crüger, the cantor and organist at the Nicolaikirche in Berlin. Crüger was impressed by Gerhardt's hymns and included many of them in his Praxis pietatis melica (1648). The hymns proved popular, and Gerhardt and Crüger began a collaboration and friendship that continued for many years.

In September 1651, Gerhardt received his first ecclesiastical appointment as the new Probst at Mittenwalde (a small town near Berlin). It was during his time in Mittenwalde that he composed most of his hymns. He also worked as a tutor to the family of Andreas Barthold, and married his daughter Anna Maria Barthold. Their first child was born there in 1656, but died in infancy; a memorial tablet in the church shows their grief.

While Gerhardt was a devoted pastor in Mittenwalde it appears he missed Berlin. In 1657 he was called to be a Deacon (Associate Pastor) to the Nikolaikirche of Berlin. He seems to have had some hesitancy about leaving Mittenwalde since it was only after long deliberation that he accepted the appointment.

When Gerhardt came to Berlin he found a city full of strife between the Lutheran and Reformed clergy. The Elector at the time was Friedrich Wilhelm I of Brandenburg, who was Reformed. He wanted to make peace between the clerical factions, but being Reformed himself, he concentrated most of his efforts on making his lands more Calvinist. He placed only Reformed pastors into parishes, removed the Lutheran professors from the University of Frankfurt and forbade students from his lands to study at the University of Wittenberg.

He also sponsored a series of conferences between the Lutheran and Reformed clergy in the hopes of having them arrive at some consensus, but the result was the opposite: the more the two sides argued, the further apart they found themselves. Gerhardt was a leading voice among the Lutheran clergy, and drew up many of the statements in defense of the Lutheran faith. At the same time he was renowned for acting fraternally not only with the Lutherans but also with the Reformed clergy; he was respected and very well liked by all. His sermons and devotional writings were so free from controversy that many among the Reformed attended his services, and the wife of the Elector, Louisa Henrietta, was a great admirer of him and his hymns.

The Elector, however, was growing impatient with a lack of success at his conferences. He put an end to them in 1664 and published his "syncretistic" edict. Since the edict disallowed the Formula of Concord, one of the Lutheran Confessions as contained in the Book of Concord, many Lutheran clergy could not bring themselves to comply with the edict. Gerhardt was thus removed from his position in 1666.

The citizens of Berlin petitioned to have him restored, and owing to their repeated requests an exception to the edict was made for Gerhardt, although his conscience did not allow him to retain a post which, it appeared to him, could only be held on condition of a tacit repudiation of the Formula of Concord. For over a year he lived in Berlin without fixed employment. During this time his wife also died, leaving him with only one surviving child, a son. Ironically the edict was withdrawn a few months later, although by this time his patroness, Electress Louisa Henrietta had died as well and so he was still without a position. In October 1668 he was called as archdeacon of Lübben in the duchy of Saxe-Merseburg, where, after a ministry of eight years, he died on 27 May 1676.

Gerhardt is considered Germany's greatest hymn writer. Many of his best-known hymns were originally published in various church hymn-books, as for example in that for Brandenburg, which appeared in 1658; others first saw the light in Johann Crüger's Geistliche Kirchenmelodien (1647) and Praxis pietatis melica. The first complete collection is the Geistliche Andachten, published in 1666–1667 by Ebeling, music director in Berlin. No hymn by Gerhardt of a later date than 1667 is known to exist.

The life of Gerhardt has been described in works by Roth (1829), Langbecker (1841), Schultz (1842), Wildenhahn (1845) and Bachmann (1863); also by Kraft in Ersch's und Gruber's Allg. Encyc (1855). A short biography was also done by William Dallmann, reprinted in 2003. The best modern edition of the hymns, published by Wackernagel in 1843, has often been reprinted. There is an English translation by Kelly (Paul Gerhardt's Spiritual Songs, 1867).

== Commemoration ==
Paul Gerhardt is commemorated on 26 October in the Calendar of Saints used by some Lutheran churches in the United States, on which day the achievements of Philipp Nicolai and Johann Heermann are also commemorated.

A plaque in Wittenberg marks his lodgings, close to the university.

The Paul Gerhardt Church in Munich is named in his honour.

== Hymns ==
Johann Sebastian Bach used several single stanzas of Gerhardt's hymns in his church cantatas, motets, Passions and Christmas Oratorio. The hymn "Ich hab in Gottes Herz und Sinn" is the base for Bach's chorale cantata BWV 92.

Hymn texts by Gerhardt, listed with a translation of the first line, associated hymn tune, base, liturgical occasion, the number in the current German Protestant hymnal Evangelisches Gesangbuch (EG) and the Catholic Gotteslob (GL), use in Bachs works (BWV numbers between 1 and 200 are cantatas, BWV 245 is the St John Passion, BWV 244 is the St Matthew Passion, BWV 248 the Christmas Oratorio, BWV 439–507 appear in Schemellis Gesangbuch), and/or notes:

German title	English title	Based on	Tune	Season	German hymnal numbers	Use in compositions
"Auf, auf, mein Herz, mit Freuden"	Awake, My Heart, with Gladness		Zahn No. 2543 "Auf, auf, mein Herz" — (Crüger, Praxis pietatis melica 1648)	Easter	EG 112	BWV 441
"Barmherzger Vater, höchster Gott"						BWV 103
"Befiehl du deine Wege"	Commit Whatever Grieves Thee (also, Give to the Winds Thy Fears)	Psalm 37, Psalm 125:1, Philippians 4:6–7, 1 Peter 5:6–7	Herzlich tut mich		EG 361	BWV 244, BWV 153
"Die güldne Sonne voll Freud und Wonne"				morning song	EG 449	
"Du meine Seele singe"					EG 302	
"Ein Lämmlein geht und trägt die Schuld"	A Lamb Goes Uncomplaining Forth	Isaiah 53:1–12, Exodus 12:5, John 1:29	An Wasserflüssen Babylon	Passion	EG 83	Set to music by several composers
"Fröhlich soll mein Herze springen"				Christmas	EG 36	BWV 248
"Geh aus, mein Herz, und suche Freud"	Go Forth, My Heart, and Seek Delight				EG 503	summer song
"Gott Vater, sende deinen Geist"			sung to the melody of "Kommt her zu mir, spricht Gottes Sohn" (Zahn 2496c): BWV 74, BWV 108			
"Herr, mein Hirt, Brunn aller Freuden"						BWV 228
"Ich hab in Gottes Herz und Sinn"						chorale cantata BWV 92, BWV 65
"Ich singe dir mit Herz und Mund"	Rejoice My Heart, Be Glad and Sing				EG 324	
"Ich steh an deiner Krippen hier"				Christmas	EG 37	BWV 248
"Ist Gott für mich, so trete"	"If Jesus be my friend"				EG 351	
"Kommt und laßt uns Christum ehren"				Christmas	EG 39	
"Lobet den Herren alle, die ihn ehren					EG 447br /> GL 81	
"Nun danket all und bringet Ehr"	All Ye Who on This Earth Do Dwell				EG 322; GL 267	
"Nun lasst uns gehn und treten				New Year	EG 58	
"Nun ruhen alle Wälder"				evening song	EG 477; GL 101	BWV 392
"O Haupt voll Blut und Wunden"	O Sacred Head, Now Wounded	Psalm 22:6–8, Isaiah 53:4–5, John 10:14–15, 27–28, Hebrews 12:2	Herzlich tut mich	Passion	EG 85, GL 179	BWV 244, BWV 159
"O Jesu Christ, dein Kripplein ist"	O Jesus Christ, Thy Manger Is		O Jesu Christ, Dein kripplein ist	Christmas		
"O Welt, sieh hier dein Leben"	Upon the Cross Extended	Isaiah 53, Hebrews 9:28, 1 Peter 2:21–25	O Welt, sieh hier	Passion	EG 84	BWV 244, BWV 245
"Schaut, schaut, was ist für Wunder dar"						BWV 248 II
"Schwing dich auf zu deinem Gott"						BWV 40
"Sollt ich meinem Gott nicht singen?"	I Will Sing My Maker's Praises	Ephesians 5:19–20	Sollt ich meinem Gott nicht singen		EG 325	
"Wach auf, mein Herz, und singe	Wake up, my heart, and sing				EG 446	
"Warum sollt ich mich denn grämen"	Why Should Cross and Trial Grieve Me	1 Peter 1:6–9, James 1:2–4, 1 Peter 4:12, Matthew 11:29–30	Warum sollt ich mich denn grämen		EG 370	
"Was alle Weisheit in der Welt"						BWV 176
"Weg, mein Herz, mit den Gedanken"						BWV 32
"Wie soll ich dich empfangen"	O How Shall I Receive Thee			Advent	EG 11	BWV 248
"Wir singen dir, Immanuel"						BWV 248 II
"Zeuch ein zu deinen Toren"				Pentecost	EG 133	BWV 183
