= Befiehl du deine Wege =

Lutheran hymn by Paul Gerhardt

"Befiehl du deine Wege" is a Lutheran hymn by Paul Gerhardt. It is one of his best known hymns, and was first published in 1653 in Johann Crüger's collection of hymns and popular religious songs Praxis pietatis melica.

== Melody and use ==
The hymn is in both the standard Lutheran and Catholic German hymnbooks.

=== Hassler hymn tune ===
Johann Sebastian Bach used "Befiehl du deine Wege" and its 1601 tune by Hans Leo Hassler ("Herzlich tut mich verlangen", Zahn No. 5385a) in his St. Matthew Passion.

=== Gesius hymn tune ===
"Befiehl du deine Wege" is also sung to a tune published by Bartholomäus Gesius in 1603, "Lobet Gott unsern Herren" (Zahn No. 5393): Bach used this melody for instance in his BWV 272 four-part chorale.

== See also ==
- Give to the Winds Thy Fears
