= Johann Crüger =

German hymnwriter

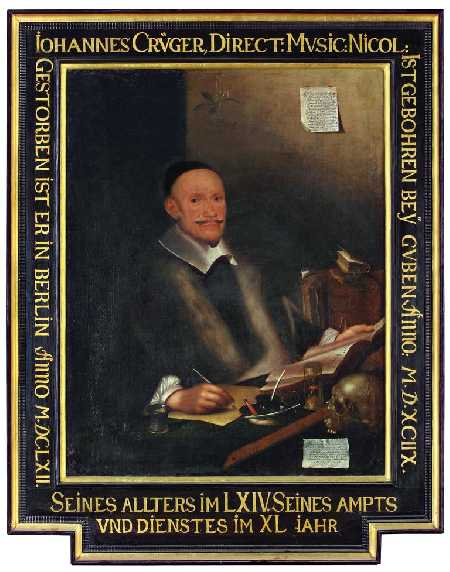
Retrospective portrait dated 1663

Johann Crüger (9 April 1598 – 23 February 1662) was a German composer of well-known hymns. He was also the editor of the most widely used Lutheran hymnal of the 17th century, Praxis pietatis melica.

== Early life and education ==
Crüger was born in Groß Breesen (now part of Guben) as the son of an innkeeper, Georg Crüger. He was an ethnic Sorb, baptized as Jan Krygar.

He studied at the nearby Lateinschule (then located in Guben) until 1613, and that school's teaching program included music and singing.

He then traveled to Sorau and Breslau for further education, and finally to Regensburg, where he received musical training from Paulus Homberger (1560–1634). In 1615 he traveled to Berlin, where he studied theology at the Berlinisches Gymnasium zum Grauen Kloster. In 1616 he was engaged as a house tutor to the von Blumenthal family; his pupils included Joachim Friedrich von Blumenthal. From 1620 he studied theology at the University of Wittenberg and trained himself further in music through private study.

== Career ==
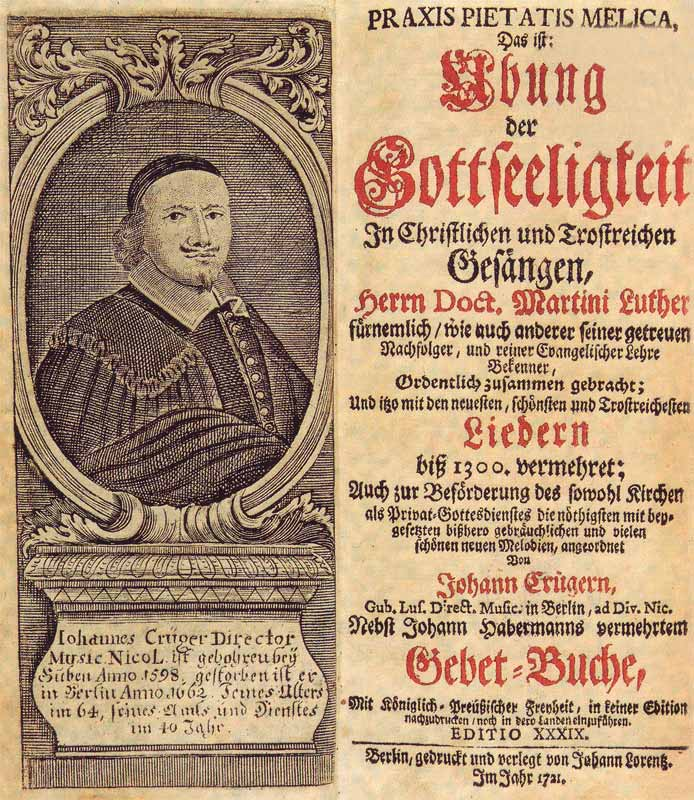
Praxis pietatis melica, title page of 39th edition, 1721, Crüger left

From 1622 to his death, a period of 40 years, he was simultaneously a teacher at the gymnasium Zum Grauen Kloster and cantor of the Nikolaikirche in Berlin.

Crüger composed numerous concert works and wrote extensively on music education. In 1643 he became acquainted with the famous hymn writer Paul Gerhardt, for whom he wrote the music for various hymns, including "Wie soll ich dich empfangen". In 1647 he edited the most important German Lutheran hymnal of the 17th century, Praxis pietatis melica, which appeared in many more editions.

Among the hymns for which he composed music is Johann Franck's "Du, o schönes Weltgebäude" (You, o beautiful building of the world). It is no longer in practical use, but one stanza, "Komm, o Tod, du Schlafes Bruder" (Come, O death, to sleep a brother), was prominently used in Bach's solo cantata Ich will den Kreuzstab gerne tragen, BWV 56. He composed the tune for Rinkart's "Nun danket alle Gott", and for Franck's "Jesu, meine Freude", which Bach used for a motet of the same name.

== Personal life ==
In 1628, he married the widow of a city councilman. During the Thirty Years' War, Crüger and his family endured many hardships including hunger. He fell ill with plague, and almost died of that disease, losing five children and his wife in 1636. In 1637, having recovered from the disease, he got married a second time, to the 17-year-old daughter of an innkeeper, with whom he had fourteen children, most of whom died at a young age. One of his daughters married the court painter Michael Conrad Hirt, who made a portrait of Crüger in 1663. Crüger died in Berlin.
