= Gottfried Vopelius =

German lutheran academic and hymn-writer (1645–1715)

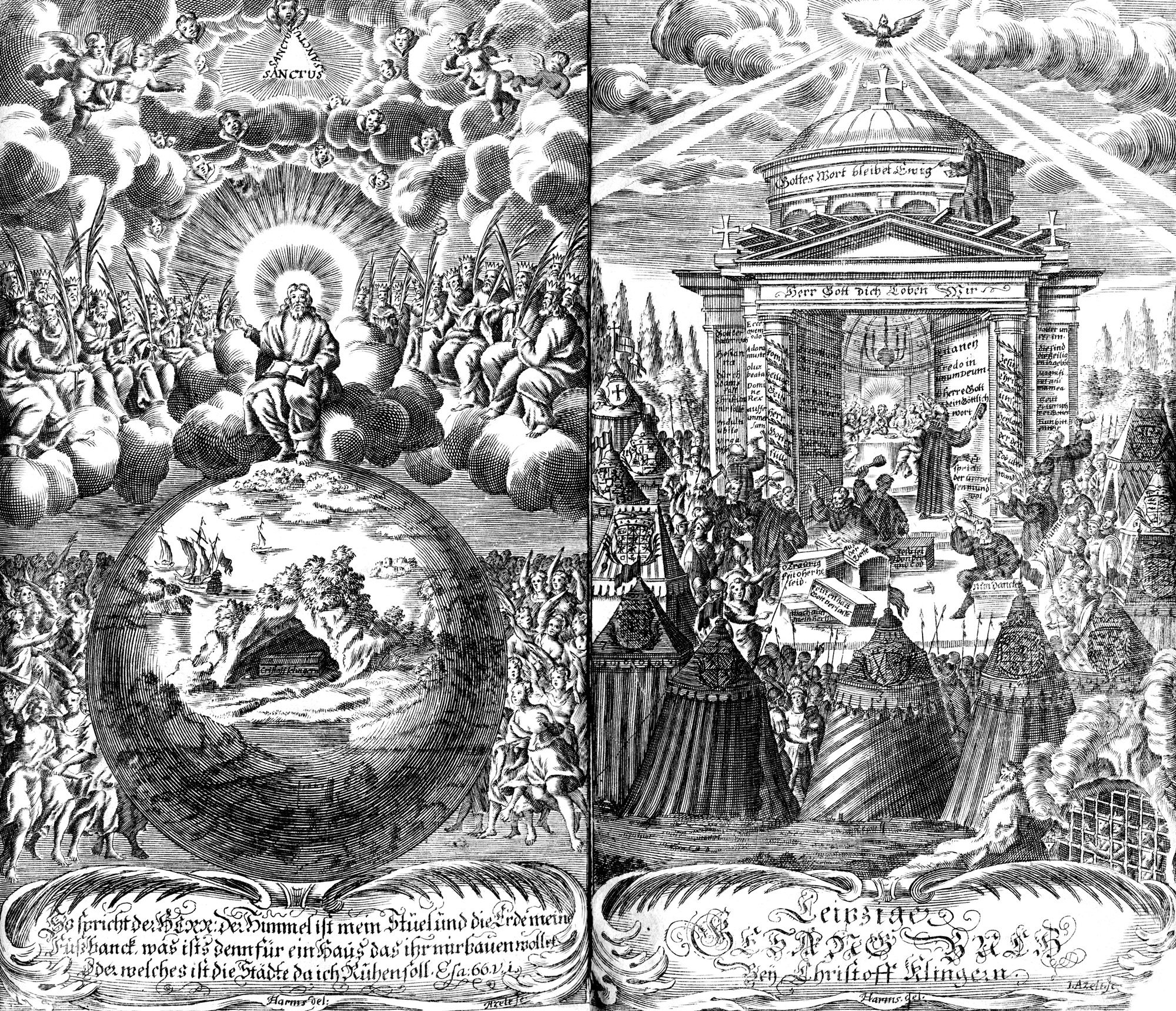
Engravings from Vopelius' 1693 Leipziger Gesangbuch, which was largely based on his earlier Neu Leipziger Gesangbuch (1682).

Gottfried Vopelius (28 January 1645 – 3 February 1715), was a German Lutheran academic and hymn-writer, mainly active in Leipzig. He was born in Herwigsdorf, now a district of Rosenbach, Oberlausitz, and died in Leipzig at the age of 70.

== Neu Leipziger Gesangbuch ==
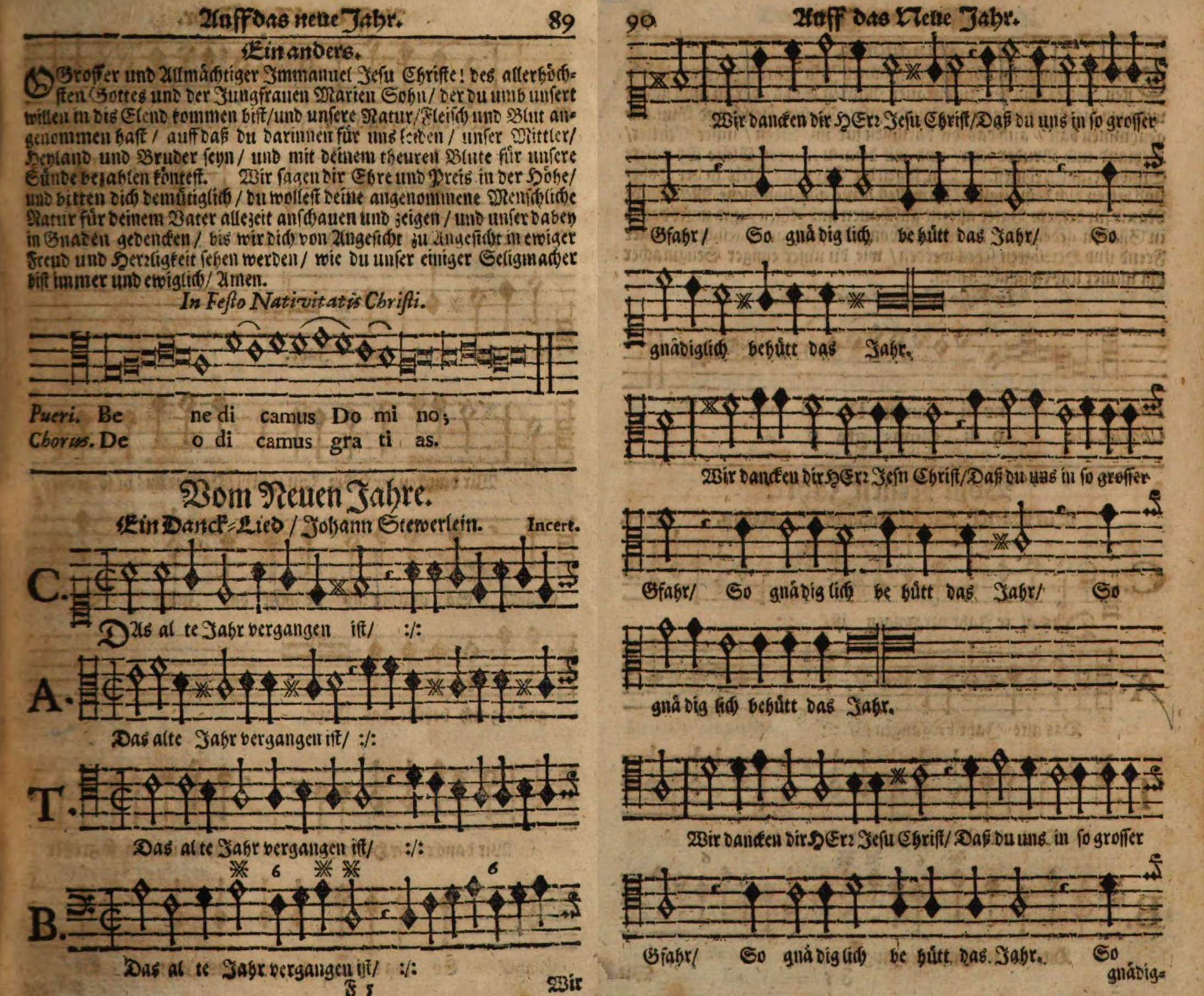
Pages 89–90 from the Neu Leipziger Gesangbuch: end of the section on Christmas (pp. 24–89) and start of the section on New Year (pp. 89–103), with the Lutheran hymn "Das alte Jahr vergangen ist"

Vopelius is primarily remembered for the Neu Leipziger Gesangbuch (New Leipzig Hymnal) which he published in 1682. The subtitle of the publication reads:

... Von den schönsten und besten Liedern verfasset, In welchem Nicht allein des sel. Herrn D. Lutheri und andere mit Gottes Wort, und unveränderter Augsburgischer Confession überein stimmende, und in Christlicher Gemeine allhier, wie auch anderer reinen Evangelischen Orten und Landen eingeführete und gebräuchliche Gesänge, Lateinische Hymni und Psalmen, Mit 4. 5. bis 6. Stimmen, deren Melodeyen Theils aus Johann Herman Scheins Cantional, und andern guten Autoribus zusammen getragen, theils aber selbsten componiret; Sondern auch die Passion nach den heiligen Evangelisten Matthaeo und Johanne, die Auferstehung, die Missa, Praefationes, Responsoria und Collecten, auf die gewöhnlichen Sonn- und hohen Festtage, das Magnificat nach den 8. Tonis, Te Deum laudamus, Symbolum Nicaenum, &c. Choraliter, Und was sonsten bey dem ordentlichen Gottesdienste gesungen wird, zu finden

— Gottfried Vopelius, title page of the Neu Leipziger Gesangbuch

Or, translated:

... Compiled from the most beautiful and best songs; In which not only songs of the blessed Dr. Luther, and other (songs) with the Word of God, and in accord with the unmodified Augsburg Confession, but also (songs) as introduced and customary in other untainted Evangelical places and regions, and Latin hymns and psalms, set for four, five and up to six voices, the settings of which are partly collected from Johann Hermann Schein's Cantional, and from other good authors, and partly also composed by myself, also, in particular, the Passion according to the holy Evangelists Matthew and John, the Resurrection, the Mass, Prefaces, Responsories and Collects, for ordinary Sundays and high Feasts, the Magnificat in the eight tones, Te Deum laudamus, Symbolum Nicenum, etc. choraliter, and whatever else is sung in regular church services, are to be found

The Neu Leipziger Gesangbuch is, to a certain degree, a third edition of Johann Schein's Cantional, which originally had been published in 1627, with a new edition in 1645. Over 90 settings in the Neu Leipziger Gesangbuch were copied or adapted from Schein. All other composers are represented with less than 10 settings in the hymnal. Of these, only Johann Crüger and Andreas Hammerschmidt are mentioned for more than three settings.

Legend to the table
Column		Content
1	Page	Page numbers in Neu Leipziger Gesangbuch, linking to the page of a digital facsimile at Google Books
2	Context	Characteristics as mentioned in the title or introduction of the song, inasmuch as such information is not covered by other columns of the table. Chapters of the book are indicated by rows with a grey background colour: Von der Menschwerdung Jesu Christi ("On the Incarnation of Jesus Christ", pp. 1–24); Von der Geburt Jesu Christi ("On the Birth of Jesus Christ", pp. 24–89); Auff das neue Jahr ("On the New Year", pp. 89–103); Auff das fest der heyligen drey Könige ("On the feast of the three holy kings", pp. 104–111); Am Tage der Reinigung Mariä ("On the day of the Purification of Mary", pp. 112–121); Vom Leiden und Sterben Jesu Christi ("On the passion and death of Jesus Christ", pp. 122–272); Von der Aufferstehung Jesu Christi ("On the Resurrection of Jesus Christ", pp. 272–370); Von der Himmelfahrt Jesu Christi ("On the Ascension of Jesus Christ", pp. 371–389); Von der Sendung des Heiligen Geistes ("On the descent of the Holy Ghost", pp. 390–416); Von der Heiligen Dreyfaltigkeit ("On the Holy Trinity", pp. 416–435); Am Tage St. Johannis des Täuffers ("On the day of St. John the Baptist", pp. 436–440); Am Tage Mariä Heimsuchung ("On the day of the Visitation of Mary", pp. 440–450); Am Tage Michaelis ("On Michael's day", pp. 451–473); An den Apostel-Festen ("At the feasts of the Apostles", pp. 473–490); Catechismus-Lieder ("Catechism songs", pp. 490–539); Morgen-Gesänge ("Morning songs", pp. 540–570); Abend-Gesänge ("Evening songs", pp. 570–585); Vor dem Essen ("Before meals", pp. 585–587); Nach dem Essen ("After meals", pp. 587–602); Umb schön Wetter, oder einen früchtbaren Regen ("For fine weather, or a fertile rain", pp. 602–606); Von der Rechtfertigung ("Regarding the justification", pp. 606–646); Psalm-Lieder ("Psalm songs", pp. 646–714); Vom Creutz, Verfolgung und Anfechtung ("About the cross, persecution and trials", pp. 714–795); Vom Wort Gottes und der Christlichen Kirchen ("About God's word and the Christian churches", pp. 796–835); Vom Tod und Sterben ("On death and dying", pp. 836–992); Vom Jüngsten Tage und ewigen Leben ("On the end of time and eternal life", pp. 992–1017); Die Litaney ("The litany", pp. 1018–1023); Wiegen-Lieder ("Lullabies", pp. 1024–1027); Hochzeit-Lied ("Wedding-song", pp. 1027–1029); Von den dreyen Hauptständen ("On the three estates", pp. 1029–1036); Gesänge für die Gregorian-Schüler ("for students of Gregorian chant", pp. 1036–1072); Anhang ("Annex", pp. 1073–1104)
3	Incipit	Text incipit (usually considered to be the name of the hymn or text)
4	Author	Text author, as attributed in the book (may be incomplete and/or incorrect); "(transl.)" indicates that the author is mentioned as translator.
5	Setting	Type of musical setting, e.g. "SATB hymn" refers to a hymn set as a four-part chorale, "Bc" refers to thoroughbass (basso continuo) accompaniment; Alternatively, page number of another hymn tune if so indicated in the book.
6	Composer	Composer of the setting, as attributed in the book (may be incomplete and/or incorrect). For part songs this usually refers to the composer of the harmonisation.
7	Occasion	Occasion for which the hymn is suitable, according to the Registers (after p. 1104)

Lyrics and settings included in the Neu Leipziger Gesangbuch
Page	Context	Incipit	Author	Setting	Composer	Occasion
1–24	Von der Menschwerdung...	(↑ Go to top of table ↑)				Advent
1	motet	Hosianna dem Sohne...	—	SSATB	—	—
6	Veni redemptor gentium	Nun komm, der Heiden Heiland	Luther (transl.)	SATB hymn	—	Advent
8	Veni redemptor gentium	Veni redemptor gentium	Ambrose	SATB hymn	Schein	Advent
10	Bohemian Brethren	Von Adam her so lange Zeit	Weiße (transl.)	→p. 8		Advent
10	Bohemian Brethren	Von Adam her so lange Zeit	Weiße (transl.)	→p. 24		Advent
12	Bohemian Brethren	Gottes Sohn ist kommen	Weiße (transl.)	SATB hymn	—	Advent
14	Bohemian Brethren	Menschenkind merck eben	Weiße (transl.)	→p. 12		Advent; Trinity IX
16	sequence	Mittit ad Virginem	Abelard	chant	—	Advent
16	sequence	Als der gütige Gott (after Mittit...)	—	chant	—	Advent
18	antiphon (Advent)	Ecce Dominus veniet	—	chant	—	—
19	responsory (Advent)	Rex noster adveniet Christus	—	chant	—	—
20	preface (ordinary)	Dominus vobiscum	—	chant	—	—
22	collects (etc.)	Benedicamus Domino	—	chant	—	Advent
24–89	Von der Geburt Jesu Christi	(↑ Go to top of table ↑)				Christmas
24	birth of Christ	Vom Himmel hoch, da komm...	Luther	SATB hymn	—	Christmas→Candlemas
27	birth of Christ	Vom Himmel kam der Engel...	Luther	→p. 24		Christmas→Candlemas
28	A solis ortus cardine	A solis ortus cardine	Sedulius	SATB hymn	Schein	Christmas→Candlemas
30	A solis ortus cardine	Christum wir sollen loben schon	Luther (transl.)	→p. 28		Christmas→Candlemas
31	song of praise	Gelobet seist du, Jesu Christ	Luther	SATB hymn	—	Christmas→Candlemas
33	Dies est laetitiae	Dies est laetitiae	—	chant	—	Christmas→Candlemas
34	Dies est laetitiae	Der Tag der ist so...	Luther (transl.)	SATB hymn	—	Christmas→Candlemas
37	birth of Christ	Nun ist es Zeit, zu singen hell	Helmbold	SATB hymn	Schein	Christmas→Candlemas
39	Hussite macaronic	In dulci jubilo	Dresdensis	SATB hymn	Schein	Christmas→Candlemas
41	Puer natus (Huss. mac.)	Puer natus in Bethlehem	Dresdensis	SATB hymn	—	Christmas→Candlemas
42	Puer natus (Huss. mac.)	Ein Kind geborn zu Bethlehem	Dresdensis	SATB hymn	—	Christmas→Candlemas
43	birth of Christ	Uns ist geborn ein Kindelein	Luther	→p. 41		Christmas→Candlemas
43	birth of Christ	Uns ist ein... Des...	—	→p. 505		Christmas→Candlemas
44	Christmas night	Quem pastores laudavere	—	SATB x 4	—	Christmas→Candlemas
46	birth of Christ	Weil Maria schwanger ging	Weiße (transl.)	→p. 34		Epiphany→Candlemas
48	Christmas night	Nunc angelorum gloria	—	SATB hymn	—	Christmas→Candlemas
50	birth of Christ	Heut sind die lieben Engelein	—	SATB hymn	—	Christmas→Candlemas
53	birth of Christ	Uns ist ein... Ein...	—	→p. 592		Christmas→Candlemas
53	birth of Christ	Laßt uns alle fröhlich sein	—	SATB hymn	—	Christmas→Candlemas
55	birth of Christ	Wir Christenleut habn itzund...	—	SATB hymn	—	Christmas→Candlemas
57	birth of Christ	Lobt Gott ihr Christen...	Herman	SATB hymn	—	Christmas→Candlemas
59	In natali Domini	In natali Domini	—	→p. 589		Christmas→Candlemas
59	In natali Domini	Als Christus gebohren war	—	→p. 589		Christmas→Candlemas
60	birth of Christ	Ein Kindlein zart, göttlicher Art	—	SATB hymn	—	Christmas→Candlemas
62	3 voices	[Alleluja!] Freuet euch, ihr...	—	SSB	Hammerschmidt	Christmas→Candlemas
65	Benedicamus (instead of)	Fit porta Christi...	—	SATB hymn	—	Christmas→Candlemas; Annunciation
68	birth of Christ	Ihr Gestirn, ihr holen Lüfte	Franck, J.	SATB hymn	Petri	Christmas→Candlemas
70	birth of Christ	Ermuntre dich, mein...	Rist	SATB hymn	—	Christmas→Candlemas
73	Heu! quid...	Heu! quid jaces stabulo	Mombaer	SATB hymn	Franck, M.	Christmas→Candlemas
76	Heu! quid...	Warum liegt im Krippelein	—	SATB hymn	Franck, M.	Christmas→Candlemas
76	Grates nunc omnes	Grates nunc omnes	Gregory	chant	—	Christmas→Candlemas
76	Grates nunc omnes	Danksagen wir alle Gott	Alberus (transl.)	chant	—	Christmas→Candlemas
77	Incarnation of Jesus Christ	Virga Jesse floruit	—	SATB & Bc	—	Christmas→Candlemas
84	responsory (from John 1)	Verbum caro factum...	—	chant	—	Christmas; New Year; Candlemas
85	preface	Dominus vobiscum	—	chant	—	Christmas; New Year; Candlemas
88	collects (etc.)	Benedicamus Domino	—	chant	—	Christmas; New Year; Epiph.; Candlem.; Annunc.
89–103	Auff das neue Jahr	(↑ Go to top of table ↑)				New Year
89	song of thanks	Das alte Jahr...	Steuerlein	SATB hymn	—	New Year
92	song of thanks (acrostic)	Helft mir Gotts Güte preisen	Eber	SATB hymn	Schein	Advent III/IV; New Year
94	song of thanks	Jesu, nun sei gepreiset	Hermann	SATB hymn	Schein	New Year
97	song of thanks	Hilf, Herr Jesu, laß gelingen	Rist	SATB hymn	Schop	New Year
101	song of thanks	Das neugeborne Kindelein	—	SATB hymn	—	New Year
104–111	Auff das Fest ... Könige	(↑ Go to top of table ↑)				Epiphany
104	Hostis Herodes impie	Hostis Herodes impie	Sedulius	→p. 28		Epiphany
104	Hostis Herodes impie	Was fürchtst du Feind Herodes...	Luther (transl.)	→p. 28		Epiphany
105	Wise Men of the East	Als Jesus geboren war zu...	Weiße	—		Epiphany
106	responsory (from Isaiah 9)	Illuminare Jerusalem	—	chant	—	Epiphany
108	preface	Dominus vobiscum	—	chant	—	Epiphany
112–121	Am Tage der Reinigung...	(↑ Go to top of table ↑)				Candlemas
112	Canticle of Simeon (Lk 2)	Herr, nun lässest du deinen...	—	SATB chant	—	Candlemas
113	Canticle of Simeon (Lk 2)	Nunc dimittis	—	SATB chant	—	Candlemas
113	Canticle of Simeon	Mit Fried und Freud ich fahr dahin	Luther	SATB hymn	Schein	Candlemas
116	Ex legis observantia	Ex legis observantia	—	SATB hymn	Schein	Candlemas
118	Ex legis observantia	Heut hat Marien Kindelein	Schmuck (trsl.)	→p. 116		Candlemas
118	antiphon (Annunc. of Mary)	Haec est dies	—	chant	—	Annunciation
120	Purification to Lent	Dies absoluti praetereunt	—	chant	—	After Candlemas
122–272	Vom Leiden und Sterben...	(↑ Go to top of table ↑)				Passiontide
122	Seven Words	Da Jesus an dem Kreuze stund	—	SATB hymn	Schein	Lent; Good Friday
124	Seven Words	Da Jesus an dem Kreuze stund	Schmuck (corr.)	→p. 122		Lent; Good Friday
125	Bohemian Brethren	Die Propheten han propheceyt	Weiße (transl.)	→p. 796		Esto mihi; Lent
126	Rex Christe, factor...	Rex Christe, factor omnium	Gregory	SATB hymn	Schein	Lent
128	Rex Christe, factor...	Herr Christe, treuer Heyland	Schmuck (trsl.)	→p. 126		Lent
129	Passion of Jesus	Sündiger Mensch, schau wer du...	Weiße	→p. 572		Esto mihi; Lent
130	Passion from 4 Evangelists	O Mensch, bewein dein Sünde...	Heyden	SATB hymn	Schein	Lent
138	Passion of Jesus	O wir armen Sünder	Bonnus	SATB hymn	Praetorius	Esto mihi; Lent
140	Passion	Da der Herr Christ zu Tische saß	—	→p. 623		Lent
144	Passion of Jesus	O Jesu Christ, dein Nam der ist...	—	SATB hymn	Schein	Lent
148	Passion of Jesus	Christus, der uns selig macht	Weiße	SATB hymn	—	Lent; Palm Sunday
151	Passion of Jesus	Christus, der uns selig macht	Weiße	SATB hymn	Schein	Lent; Palm Sunday
153	Augustine	Herzliebster Jesu, was hast du...	Heermann	SATB hymn	Crüger	Lent
156	funeral song (Good Friday)	O Traurigkeit! O Herzeleid!	Rist	SATB hymn	Knüpfer	Lent
158	Louis the Pious era	Gloria, laus et honor tibi sit,...	Theodulf	chant	Theodulf	Lent; Palm Sunday
161	Passion of Jesus	Ecce cruci affixum	Pistorius, L.	SATB hymn	Bodenschatz	Lent
162	Passion of Jesus	Hilff Gott, daß mirs gelinge	Muler (ADB)	SATB hymn	—	Lent
165	Passion of Jesus	Jesu Leiden, Pein und Tod	Stockmann	SATB hymn	—	Lent
171	Passion of Jesus	Der frömmste Mensch	Ritzsch	→p. 849		Lent
173	Agnus Dei	O Lamm Gottes, unschuldig	—	SATB hymn	—	Lent
175	Passion of Jesus	Jesu deine tieffe Wunden	Heermann	→p. 767		Lent
176	Passion of Jesus	Wann meine Sünde mich kränken	—	→p. 162		Lent
177	Passion of Jesus (thanks)	Du grosser Schmerzen-Mann	—	SATB hymn	—	Lent
179	St Matthew Passion	Höret an ... Mattheo	—	chant/SATB	—	Palm Sunday
227	St John Passion	Das Leiden ... Johannes	—	chant/SATB	—	Good Friday
263	Ecce quomodo moritur	Ecce quomodo moritur justus	—	SATB	Handl	Good Friday
263	Ecce quomodo moritur	Sihe, wie dahin stirbt der...	—	SATB	Handl	Good Friday
268	responsory (Maundy Thur.)	Discubuit Jesus	—	chant	—	—
269	responsory (Good Friday)	Tenebrae factae sunt	—	chant	—	—
271	collects (etc.)	Benedicamus Domino	—	chant	—	Lent
272–370	Von der Aufferstehung...	(↑ Go to top of table ↑)				Eastertide
272	Christ ist... improved	Christ lag in Todes Banden	Luther	SATB hymn	Schein	Eastertide
275	Vita Sanctorum, Decus...	Vita Sanctorum, Decus...	—	SATB hymn	Schein	Eastertide
277	Vita Sanctorum, Decus...	Der Heiligen Leben	Spangen. (trsl.)	SATB hymn	Schein	Eastertide
277	Victimae paschali	Victimae paschali laudes	—	chant	—	Eastertide
278	Victimae paschali	Christo, dem Osterlämmlein	Herman (trsl.)	→p. 301		Eastertide
279	Easter	Erstanden ist der heilige Christ	—	SATB hymn	Schein	Eastertide
282	Resurrection of Jesus	Heut triumphiret Gottes Sohn	—	6 vv. hymn	—	Eastertide
286	Resurrection of Jesus	Christus ist erstanden, von des...	—	SATB hymn	—	Eastertide
287	Salve festa dies	Salve festa dies	—	—		Eastertide
288	Salve festa dies	Willkommen sei die fröhlich Zeit	—	SATB hymn	Franck, M.	Eastertide
290	Easter	Christ ist erstanden von der...	—	SATB hymn	—	Eastertide
294	Easter	Jesus Christus, unser..., der den...	Luther	SATB hymn	—	Eastertide
296	Surrexit Christus hodie	Surrexit Christus hodie	—	SATB hymn	—	Eastertide
297	Surrexit Christus hodie	Erstanden ist der...	—	SATB hymn	—	Eastertide
298	Resurrection of Jesus	Dieses ist der Tag der Wonne	Franck, J.	SSATB	Petri	Eastertide
301	Resurrection of Jesus	Erschienen ist der herrlich Tag	Herman	SATB hymn	Schein	Eastertide
304	Resurrection of Jesus	Also heilig ist der Tag	—	SATB hymn	Schein	Eastertide
306	Horn's Gesangbuch	Christus ist erstanden, hat...	—	SATB hymn	—	Eastertide
309	Bohemian Brethren	Betrachtn wir heut zu dieser Frist	—	SATB hymn	—	Eastertide
311	Resurr. from 4 Evangelists	Die Aufferstehung unsers Herrn...	—	SSATB/sol.	—	Easter
365	responsory (Easter)	Dum transisset...	—	chant	—	Easter
367	preface (Easter)	Dominus vobiscum	—	chant	—	Easter
369	collects (etc.)	Benedicamus Domino	—	chant	—	Easter; Ascension
371–389	Von der Himmelfahrt...	(↑ Go to top of table ↑)				Ascension
371	Ascension of Jesus	Christ fuhr gen Himmel	—	→p. 290		Ascension
371	Festum nunc...	Festum nunc celebre	—	SATB hymn	Schein	Ascension
373	Festum nunc...	Nun begehn wir das Fest	Schein (transl.)	SATB hymn	Schein	Ascension
374	song of joy	Nun freut euch, Gottes Kinder all	Alberus	SATB hymn	Schein	Ascension
377	Cœlos...	Cœlos ascendit hodie	—	SATB hymn	Franck, M.	Ascension
378	Cœlos...	Gen Himmel...	—	SATB hymn	Franck, M.	Ascension
379	Ascension of Jesus	Freut euch, ihr...	Hagius	→p. 806		—
380	Ascendit Christus hodie	Ascendit Christus hodie	—	SATTB	—	Ascension
381	Ascendit Christus hodie	Christus ist heut gen Himmel...	—	SATTB	—	Ascension
382	Ascension of Jesus	Als vierzig Tag nach Ostern warn	Herman	→p. 394		—
382	Ascension of Jesus	Als vierzig Tag nach Ostern warn	Herman	→p. 301		—
383	Ascension of Jesus	Wir danken dir, Herr Jesu Christ	Selnecker	→p. 301		—
385	responsory (Mark 16)	Ite in orbem	—	chant	—	Ascension
386	preface (Ascension)	Dominus vobiscum	—	chant	—	Ascension
390–416	Von der Sendung des H. G.	(↑ Go to top of table ↑)				Pentecost
390	antiphon (Pentecost)	Veni Sancte Spiritus, reple...	Robert II	chant	—	—
390	antiphon (Pentecost)	Komm Heiliger Geist, erfüll...	—	chant	—	—
391	Veni Sancte... improved	Komm, Heiliger Geist, Herre Gott	Luther	SATB hymn	Schein	Pentecost
394	Spiritus Sancti gratia	Spiritus Sancti gratia (6 vv.)	—	SATB hymn	—	—
396	Spiritus Sancti gratia	Des Heilgen Geistes reiche Gnad	—	SATB hymn	—	—
397	Spiritus Sancti gratia	Spiritus Sancti gratia (7 vv.)	—	SATB hymn	Schein	Pentecost
400	Veni Creator Spiritus	Veni Creator Spiritus	Ambrose	SATB hymn	Schein	Pentecost
401	Veni Creator Spiritus	Komm, Gott Schöpfer, Heiliger...	Luther (transl.)	SATB hymn	Schein	Pentecost
402	Descent of the Holy Spirit	Nun bitten wir den Heiligen Geist	Luther	SATB hymn	—	Pentecost
404	Bohemian Brethren	Als Jesus Christus, Gottes Sohn	Weiße (transl.)	→p. 394		Pentecost
405	Veni Sancte Spiritus	Veni Sancte Spiritus	—	—		—
406	Veni Sancte Spiritus	Heilger Geist, du Tröster mein	—	—		—
407	Descent of the Holy Spirit	Ein Täublein klein hat keine Gall	Wolfrum (ADB)	SATB hymn	—	—
408	Descent of the Holy Spirit	O Heiliger Geist, o heiliger Gott	—	SATB hymn	—	Pentecost
411	responsory (Pentecost)	Apparuerunt apostolis dispertitae	—	chant	—	Pentecost
412	preface (Pentecost)	Dominus vobiscum	—	chant	—	Pentecost
415	collects (etc.)	Benedicamus Domino	—	chant	—	Pentecost
416–435	Von der H. Dreyfaltigkeit	(↑ Go to top of table ↑)				Trinity
416	Trinity	Gott der Vater wohn uns bei	Luther	SATB hymn	Schein	Invocavit; Reminisc.; Oculi; Trinity/XXVI
419	Trinity	Mir ist ein geistlich Kirchelein	Derschau	→p. 796		—
419	O lux beata...	O lux beata Trinitas	Ambrose	SATB hymn	Schein	Trinity
420	O lux beata...	Der du bist drei in Einigkeit	Luther (transl.)	SATB hymn	Schein	Trinity
421	Kyrie + old praise of Trinity	Missa (Kyrie–Gloria Mass)	—	chant	—	—
423	Kyrie Fons bonitatis	Kyrie, fons bonitatis	—	chant	—	—
423	Kyrie Fons bonitatis	Kyrie, Gott Vater in Ewigkeit	Luther (transl.)	chant	—	—
425	Gloria in excelsis Deo	Allein Gott in der Höh sei Ehr	Selnecker	SATB hymn	—	Trinity
427	Trinity Sunday	Benedicta semper sancta sit...	—	chant	—	—
429	responsory (Trinity S.)	Summae Trinitati	—	chant	—	Trinity
431	preface (Trinity S.)	Dominus vobiscum	—	chant	—	Trinity
434	collects (etc.)	Benedicamus Domino	—	chant	—	Trinity
436–440	Am Tage St. Johannis des T.	(↑ Go to top of table ↑)				St. John's Day
436	Canticle of Zachary (Lk 1)	Gelobet sei der Herr der Gott...	—	SATB chant	Schein	St. John's Day
438	Canticle of Zachary (Lk 1)	Benedictus Dominus Deus Israel	—	—		St. John's Day
438	responsory (St. John's Day)	Inter natos mulierum	—	chant	—	St. John's Day
440	preface (St. John's Day)	Dominus vobiscum	—	→p. 20		St. John's Day
440	collects (etc.)	Benedicamus Domino	—	→p. 435		St. John's Day
440–450	Am Tage Mariä Heimsuch.	(↑ Go to top of table ↑)				Visitation
440	Magnificat (Lk 1)	Meine Seele erhebt den Herren	—	SATB chant	Schein	Visitation
442	Tone I–VIII	Magnificat	—	chant	—	Visitation
444	Magnificat	Meine Seele Gott erhebt	Keymann (trsl.)	SATB hymn	Vopelius	—
445	responsory (Visitation)	Magnificat anima mea Dominum	—	chant	—	Visitation
447	preface (Visitation)	Dominus vobiscum	—	chant	—	Visitation
450	collects (etc.)	Benedicamus Domino	—	→p. 435		Visitation
451–473	Am Tage Michaelis	(↑ Go to top of table ↑)				Michaelmas
451	Dicimus grates tibi	Dicimus grates tibi	Melanchthon	SATB hymn	Schein	Michaelmas
453	Dicimus grates tibi	Laßt uns von Herzen danken...	—	SATB hymn	—	Michaelmas
456	Dicimus grates tibi	Herr Gott, dich loben alle wir	Eber (transl.)	SATB hymn	Schein	Michaelmas
458	St. Michael's Day	Es stehn für Gottes Throne	Helmbold	SATB hymn	—	Michaelmas
461	Choir of Angels (Is. 6:2–4)	Fürst und Herr der starken Helden	Frentzel	SSATB	Michael	Michaelmas
468	responsory (Michaelmas)	Te sanctum Dominum	—	chant	—	Michaelmas
470	preface (Michaelmas)	Dominus vobiscum	—	chant	—	Michaelmas
472	collects (etc.)	Benedicamus Domino	—	chant	—	Michaelmas
473–490	An den Apostel-Festen	(↑ Go to top of table ↑)				Apostles
473	Te Deum laudamus	Te Deum laudamus	Ambrose; Augustine	chant	—	Apostles
478	Te Deum laudamus	Herr Gott, dich loben wir	Luther (transl.)	SATBSATB	Schein	Apostles; Trinity XII
488	responsory (Apostles)	Fuerunt sine querela	—	chant	—	Apostles
489	preface (Apostles)	Dominus vobiscum	—	→p. 20		Apostles
489	collects (etc.)	Benedicamus Domino	—	chant	—	Apostles
490–539	Catechismus-Lieder	(↑ Go to top of table ↑)				—
490	Ten Commandments	Dies sind die heilgen zehn Gebot	Luther	SATB hymn	Schein	Epiphany I; Trinity IV/VI/XIII/XVIII
493	Ten Commandments (short)	Mensch, willst du leben...	Luther	SATB hymn	Schein	Trinity IV/VI
494	Ten Commandments (learn)	O Mensch wiltu vor Gott bestahn	Schein	→p. 490		Trinity IV
495	Ten Commandments (learn)	O Mensch wiltu vor Gott bestahn	Schein	SATB hymn	—	Trinity IV
497	Creed	Credo in unum Deum	Nicaea 325	chant	—	—
501	Creed	Wir glauben all an einen Gott	Luther	SATB hymn	—	—
505	Lord's Prayer	Vater unser im Himmelreich	Luther	SATB hymn	Schein	Epiphany III; Septuag.; Invoc.; Rogate; Trin. V/VII/XI/XIV/XV/XXII/XXV; wedding
507	Baptism	Christ unser Herr zum Jordan kam	Luther	SATB hymn	Schein	St. John's Day
511	Aufer a nobis Domine	Aufer a nobis Domine	—	chant	—	—
511	Aufer a nobis Domine	Nimm von uns Herr Gott	—	chant	—	—
512	Catechism	So wahr ich lebe, spricht dein...	—	chant	—	—
512	Catechism	Allein zu dir, Herr Jesu Christ	Hubert	SATB hymn	—	Epiphany III; Trin. III/XI/XXI/XXII/XXIV
515	Bohemian Brethren	Aus tiefer Not laßt uns zu Gott	—	SATB hymn	—	Trinity XIX
518	Catechism	Ach Gott und Herr	Göldel (vv. 1–6); Major (vv. 7–)	SATB hymn	—	—
520	penance	Herr Jesu Christ, du höchstes Gut	Ringwaldt	→p. 856		—
520	penance	Herr Jesu Christ, du höchstes Gut	Ringwaldt	SATB hymn	—	—
523	consolation	Wo soll ich fliehen hin	Heermann	→p. 776		Trinity III
524	Sanctus	Esaia dem Propheten das...	Luther	hymn	—	Eucharist
526	Catechism	Jesus Christus, unser..., der von...	Hus/Luther	SATB hymn	—	Maundy Thursday; Eucharist
528	song of praise	Gott sei gelobet und gebenedeiet	Luther	SATB hymn	—	Eucharist
531	Psalm 111 (fauxbourdon)	Ich danke dem Herrn...	—	SATB hymn	—	Maundy Thursday; Trin. XIV; Eucharist
533	Catechism	O Jesu, du mein Bräutigam	Hermann	→p. 701		—
535	Catechism	Als Jesus Christus in der Nacht	Heermann	SATB hymn	Crüger	Maundy Thursday
536	Eucharist	Wir wollen singen Heut von...	—	SATB hymn	—	Maundy Thursday
540–570	Morgen-Gesänge	(↑ Go to top of table ↑)				—
540	Morning song	Aus meines Herzens...	Mathesius	SATB hymn	—	—
542	Morning song	Ich dank dir lieber Herre	Kolross	SATB hymn	—	—
546	consolation	O Christe Morgensterne	—	SATB hymn	Schein	—
548	Bohemian Brethren	Der Tag vertreibt die finstre Nacht	—	SATB hymn	Schein	—
550	blessing, morning/evening	Des Morgens wenn ich früh...	—	→p. 574		—
550	blessing, morning/evening	Des Morgens wenn ich früh...	—	→p. 592		—
551	Morning song	Ich dank dir schon durch deinen...	Praetorius	SATB hymn	—	—
553	Morning song	Wach auf, mein Herz, und singe	Gerhardt	→p. 594		—
554	Morning song	Gott des Himmels und der Erden	—	SATB hymn	Crüger	—
556	Morning song	O Gott, ich tu dir danken	Ringwaldt	→p. 806		—
557	Morning song	Das walt Gott Vater und Gott Sohn	—	→p. 701		—
558	Morning song	Ich danck dir Gott für all Wohltat	Freder	SATB hymn	—	—
561	Morning song	Das walt mein Gott	—	SATB hymn	—	—
564	daily prayer	O Gott, du frommer Gott	Heermann	SATB hymn	Crüger	—
567	Morning song	Zu dir von Herzens Grunde	—	SATB hymn	—	—
570–585	Abend-Gesänge	(↑ Go to top of table ↑)				—
570	Christe qui lux...	Christe qui lux es et...	—	SATB hymn	Schein	Lent
572	Christe qui lux...	Christe, der du bist Tag und Licht	Weiße (transl.)	SATB hymn	Schein	Lent
574	Bohemian Brethren	Christ, der du bist der...	Weiße	SATB hymn	Schein	—
576	Bohemian, translated	Die Nacht ist kommen	—	SATB hymn	Schein	—
578	Evening song	Werde munter, mein Gemüte	Rist	SATB hymn	—	—
582	Evening song	Nun ruhen alle Wälder	Gerhardt	→p. 870		—
583	Evening song	Mein Augen schließ ich nun in...	—	—		—
584	Evening song	Hinunter ist der...	Herman	→p. 574		—
584	Evening song	Hinunter ist der...	Herman	→p. 592		—
584	Evening song	Unsre müden Augenlieder	Franck, J.	→p. 918		—
585–587	Vor dem Essen	(↑ Go to top of table ↑)				—
585	Before a meal	Dich bitten wir deine Kinder	—	→p. 614		—
586	Lord's Prayer	O Vater aller Frommen	—	→p. 614		—
586	Proverbs 30	Zwey Ding, o Herr, bitt ich von dir	—	→p. 574		—
587	Before a meal	Gesegn uns Herr die Gaben dein	—	→p. 574		—
587	Before a meal	Herr Gott Vater im Himmelreich	—	—		—
587–602	Nach dem Essen	(↑ Go to top of table ↑)				—
587	Bohemian Brethren	Danket dem Herren, denn er ist...	—	SATB hymn	—	—
589	After a meal	Herr Gott, nun sei gepreiset	—	→p. 614		—
589	Deo gratias	Singen wir aus Herzensgrund	—	SATB hymn	—	—
592	After a meal	Dankt dem Herrn heut und...	Herman	SATB hymn	—	—
594	After a meal	Nun laßt uns Gott dem Herren	Selnecker	SATB hymn	—	—
596	Psalm 147	Lobet den Herren, denn er ist...	Selnecker	SATB hymn	—	—
599	After a meal	Herr Gott wir sagen dir Lob und...	—	→p. 592		—
600	Bohemian Brethren	Den Vater dort oben	—	SATB hymn	—	—
602–606	Umb schön Wetter oder...	(↑ Go to top of table ↑)				—
602	for fine weather	Gib zum Früchten der Erden	Schmuck	→p. 614		—
602	for rain	Das Land wollst du bedencken	Schmuck	→p. 614		—
602	Domine Rex (transl.)	Herr Gott Vater, Schöpffer aller...	—	hymn	—	—
603	for fine weather or rain	Gott Vater, der du deine Sonn	Herman	SATB hymn	Schein	—
606–646	Von der Rechtfertigung	(↑ Go to top of table ↑)				—
606	justification before God	Durch Adams Fall ist ganz...	Spengler	SATB hymn	Schein	Esto mihi; Trinity VI/IX/XII/XIV
609	justification by faith	Es ist das Heil uns kommen her	Speratus	SATB hymn	Schein	Epiphany IV; Septuag.; Trinity VI/XI/XIII/XVIII
614	justification before God	Herr Christ, der einig Gotts Sohn	Knöpken	SATB hymn	—	Epiphany I/II/VI; Annunc.; St. John's D.; Visit.; Trin. XVIII/XXI
616	song of thanks	Nun freut euch, lieben Christen...	Luther	SATB hymn	Schein	Ascension; Visit.; Trin. XII/XIII/XVII/XVIII/XXVII
619	John 3:16	Also hat Gott die Welt geliebt	—	SATB hymn	Vopelius	—
623	Matthew 11	Kommt her zu mir	Ringwaldt	SATB hymn	Schein	Trinity I/XXVI
627	faith, love, steadfastness,...	Ich ruf zu dir, Herr Jesu Christ	—	SATB hymn	—	Epiphany III/V; Septuag.; Sexag.; Remin.; Oculi; Trin. II/V/VI/VIII/XIX/XXI/XXII
630	Luke 16, Rich man/Lazarus	Es war einmal ein reicher Mann	—	SATB hymn	Schein	Trinity I
635	admonition to penance	Du Sünderin wilt du mit	—	SATB hymn	Schein	—
638	justification before God	Nun danket alle Gott	Rinkart	SATB hymn	Crüger	—
640	justification before God	In allen meinen Taten	Fleming	SATB hymn	—	—
642	Bohemian Brethren	Weltlich Ehr und zeitlich Gut	Weiße (transl.)	SATB hymn	—	Trinity I/IX
646–714	Psalm-Lieder	(↑ Go to top of table ↑)				—
646	Psalm 1	Wer nicht sitzt im Gottlosen Rat	Becker	→p. 701		Trinity XXIII
647	Psalm 2	Hilff Gott, wie geht es immer zu	Knöpken	→p. 698		—
647	Psalm 2	Hilff Gott, wie geht es immer zu	Knöpken	→p. 515		—
648	Psalm 6	Ach Herr mein Gott, straff mich...	Becker	→p. 703		—
648	Psalm 6	Herr, straf mich nicht in deinem...	—	SATB hymn	Crüger	—
652	Psalm 6	Herr, nicht schicke deine Rache	—	SATB hymn	Crüger	—
655	Psalm 6	Ach Herr, mich armen Sünder	—	→p. 846		—
656	Psalm 13	Wie lange wil meiner der Herre...	Zesen	SATB hymn	—	—
659	Psalm 8	Mit Dank wir sollen loben	Becker	→p. 806		—
660	Psalm 12	Ach Gott, vom Himmel sieh...	Luther	SATB hymn	Schein	Epiphany V; Sexag.; Trinity II/VIII/XX
662	Psalm 14	Es spricht der Unweisen Mund...	Luther	SATB hymn	Schein	Epiphany V; Trinity I/II/IX/XX
665	Psalm 23	Der Herr ist mein..., Dem...	Becker	→p. 425		Trinity XV
666	Psalm 23	Der Herr ist mein..., hält...	Musculus	→p. 425		Trinity XV
667	Psalm 91	Wer in dem Schutz des...	Heyden	→p. 515		—
668	Psalm 31	In dich hab ich gehoffet, Herr	Reusner	SATB hymn	—	Laetare; Judica
670	Psalm 46 (Augsburg 1530)	Ein feste Burg ist unser Gott	Luther	SATB hymn	Schein	Invocavit; Reminisc.; Oculi; Exaudi; Trin. XXIII/XXVII
673	Psalm 51	Erbarm dich mein, o Herre Gott	Hegenwald	SATB hymn	—	Reminiscere; Oculi; Trin. III/XI/XIII/XIV/XXII
676	Psalm 51 (meditation)	O Herre Gott, begnade mich	Greitter	SATB hymn	Schein	Trin. III/XI/XIII/XIX/XXII
680	Psalm 67	Es woll uns Gott genädig sein	Luther	SATB hymn	—	—
682	Psalm 90	Herr Gott, du unser Zuflucht bist	—	SATB hymn	Schein	—
685	Psalm 91	Wer sich des...	Becker	→p. 425		—
686	Psalm 103	Nun lob, mein Seel, den Herren	Gramann	SATB hymn	Schein	Trinity VII/XII/XIV/XIX
690	Psalm 117	Fröhlich wollen wir Alleluja singen	Agricola	SATB hymn	Schein	Trinity XIV
692	Psalm 117	Lobt Gott mit Schall	Becker	→p. 718		—
693	Psalm 121	Ich heb mein Augen sehnlich auf	Becker	→p. 721		—
694	Psalm 121 (meditation)	Ich hebe meine Augen auf	Schein	SATB hymn	—	—
696	Psalm 124	Wär Gott nicht mit uns diese Zeit	Luther	SATB hymn	Schein	Epiphany IV; Exaudi; Trin. V/XXIII
698	Psalm 124 (meditation)	Wo Gott der Herr nicht bei uns...	Jonas	SATB hymn	Schein	Epiphany IV; Exaudi; Trinity XVII/XX/XXIII
701	Psalm 127	Wo Gott zum Haus	Kolross	SATB hymn	Schein	Trinity V
702	Psalm 128	Wol dem, der in Gottes Furcht...	Luther	→p. 701		Trinity VII
703	Psalm 130	Aus tiefer Not schrei ich zu dir	Luther	SATB hymn	Schein	Epiphany IV; Palm Sund.; Trin. XI/XIX/XXI/XXII
706	Psalm 137	An Wasserflüssen Babylon	Dachstein	SATB hymn	Schein	Trinity X
709	Psalm 142	Ich schrei zu meinem lieben Gott	Becker	→p. 627		—
710	Psalm 147	Lobet Gott unsern Herren	—	SATB hymn	—	—
713	Psalm 150	Lobt Gott in seinem...	Becker	SATB hymn	Schütz	—
714–795	Vom Creutz,... Anfechtung	(↑ Go to top of table ↑)				—
714	for at home	Warum betrübst du dich, mein...	Sachs	SATB hymn	Schein	Trinity VII/IX/XV
718	cross/persecution/trials	Wer Gott vertraut, hat wohl...	—	SATB hymn	—	—
721	2 Ch. 20 (Josaphat prayer)	Wenn wir in höchsten Nöten sein	Eber	SATB hymn	Schein	Epiphany IV; Reminisc.; Oculi; Exaudi; Trin. XVI
723	cross/persecution/trials	All Ding ein Weil	Herman	→p. 623		—
724	cross/persecution/trials	Mag ich Unglück nicht widerstahn	Mary of H.	SATB hymn	Schein	—
726	cross/persecution/trials	Wies Gott gefällt, so g'fällt mirs...	Johann Fr. of S.	→p. 840		—
726	cross/persecution/trials	Wies Gott gefällt, so g'fällt mirs...	Johann Fr. of S.	SATB hymn	Hammerschmidt	—
731	cross/persecution/trials	Meinem lieben Gott ergeb ich...	—	→p. 574		—
731	cross/persecution/trials	Meinem lieben Gott ergeb ich...	—	→p. 796		—
732	Matthew 16	Verzage nicht, o frommer Christ	—	SATB hymn	—	Trinity XV
736	Wer Gott vertraut, hat...	Frisch auf, mein Seel, verzage...	Helmbold	SATB hymn	Schein	—
739	cross/persecution/trials	Herzlich vertrau du deinem Gott	—	SATB hymn	Schein	—
742	teaching	Wenn dich Unglück tut greifen an	—	→p. 721		—
742	teaching	Wenn dich Unglück tut greifen an	—	SATB hymn	Schein	—
744	martyrdom of Esch & Voes	Ein neues Lied wir heben an	Luther	SATB hymn	Schein	—
749	cross/persecution/trials	Gott ist mein Trost, mein...	—	→p. 840		—
750	cross/persecution/trials	Herr Christ, wenn ich bedenke...	—	→p. 846		—
750	cross/persecution/trials	Herr Christ, wenn ich bedenke...	—	SATTB	—	—
754	cross/persecution/trials	Ach Gott, wie manches Herzeleid	Moller	→p. 863		—
754	cross/persecution/trials	Ach Gott, wie manches Herzeleid	Moller	SATB hymn	—	—
757	Saint Dorothea	Es war ein Gottfürchtiges und...	Herman	SATB hymn	—	—
761	consolation	Man spricht: Wen Gott erfreut	—	→p. 776		—
762	acrostic (Katarina)	Keinen hat Gott verlassen	—	SATB hymn	—	—
765	poverty	O Vater aller Gnaden, du hast...	Rist	→p. 806		—
767	Isaiah 49	Zion klagt mit Angst und...	Heermann	→p. 918		—
767	Isaiah 49	Zion klagt mit Angst und...	Heermann	SATTB	Demantius	—
770	cross/persecution/trials	So klaget Zion sich, und weinet...	Keymann	SATB hymn	Hammerschmidt	—
772	cross/persecution/trials	Du hast gesagt, o treuer Gott	—	→p. 703		—
773	cross/persecution/trials	Treuer Gott, ich muß dir klagen	Heermann	→p. 918		—
773	cross/persecution/trials	Treuer Gott, ich muß dir klagen	Heermann	→p. 767		—
775	against Turks & others	Ach Gott, dein arme Christenheit	—	→p. 721		—
776	scorn of death	Auf meinen lieben Gott	Weingärt. (ADB)	SATB hymn	Schein	—
778	cross/persecution/trials	Allzeit will Gott sorgen	Heermann	→p. 12		—
778	cross/persecution/trials	Allzeit will Gott sorgen	Heermann	SATB hymn	Daum	—
780	cross/persecution/trials	Jesu, meine Freude	Franck, J.	SATB hymn	—	—
783	Abraham (Genesis 18:23ff)	O grosser Gott von Macht	Meyfart	SATB hymn	—	—
787	cross/persecution/trials	Wer nur den lieben Gott läßt...	Neumark	SATB hymn	Buchner	—
790	cross/persecution/trials	Was willst du dich, o meine...	—	SATB hymn	—	—
796–835	Vom Wort Gottes... Kirchen	(↑ Go to top of table ↑)				—
796	Children's song against pope & Turks	Erhalt uns, Herr, bei deinem Wort	Luther (vv. 1–3); Jonas (vv. 4–5)	SATB hymn	Schein	—
798	Da pacem Domine	Verleih uns Frieden gnädiglich	Luther	SATB hymn	Schein	—
800	for governing bodies	Gib unserm Fürsten...	—	SATB hymn	—	—
802	God's word ... churches	Ach bleib bei uns	Selnecker	→p. 592		—
802	God's word ... churches	O Herre Gott, dein göttlich Wort	Luther	SATB hymn	Schein	Septuagesima; Trinity VIII
805	God's word ... churches	Zu Gott allein hab ichs gestellt	Christian II	→p. 724		—
806	God's word ... churches	Von Gott will ich nicht lassen	Herman	SATB hymn	Schein	—
809	God's word ... churches	Ich weiß ein Blümlein hübsch...	—	→p. 866		—
810	Christian churches	Sie ist mir lieb, die werte Magd	Luther	SATB hymn	Schein	Trinity XX
814	Psalm 45, Song of Songs	Wie schön leuchtet der...	Nicolai	SATB hymn	—	Epiphany II; Trinity II/XX/XXVII
817	God's word ... churches	Herr Jesu Christ, dich zu uns wend	—	SATB hymn	—	—
819	Matthew 25 (Ten Virgins)	Wachet auf, ruft uns die Stimme	Nicolai	SATB hymn	—	Trinity II/XX/XXVII
822	difficult/dangerous times	Nimm von uns, Herr, du treuer...	Ringwaldt	→p. 505		—
823	Battle of Leipzig (1631)	Verzage nicht, o Häuflein klein	Altenburg	—		—
824	protection from enemies	O starker Gott ins Himmels Thron	—	→p. 796		—
825	Psalm 67 (blessing)	Gott sei uns gnädig und...	—	SATB chant	Schein	—
826	song of praise	Jesu, du mein liebstes Leben	Rist	SATB hymn	Schop	—
831	for steadfastness	Laß mich dein sein und bleiben	Selnecker	→p. 542		—
832	time of war	Du Friedenfürst Herr Jesu Christ	Helmbold	SSATB	—	—
835	for peace	Da pacem Domine	—	chant	—	—
836–992	Vom Tod und Sterben	(↑ Go to top of table ↑)				—
836	death and dying	Herzlich lieb hab ich dich, o...	Schalling	SATB hymn	—	—
840	death and dying	Was mein Gott will, das gscheh...	Albert II	SATB hymn	Schein	—
843	death and dying	Ach lieben Christen seid getrost	Gigas	→p. 698		Trinity X
844	death and dying	Ein Würmlein bin ich arm und...	Fröhlich	→p. 849		—
844	death and dying	Ein Würmlein bin ich arm und...	Fröhlich	→p. 520		—
845	death and dying	Hilf, Helfer, hilf in Angst und Not	Moller	→p. 956		—
846	death and dying	Herzlich tut mich verlangen	Ringwaldt	→p. 750		—
846	death and dying	Herzlich tut mich verlangen	Ringwaldt	SATB hymn	Schein	—
849	death and dying	Wenn mein Stündlein...	Herman	SATB hymn	Schein	—
853	funeral of small children	Hie lieg ich armes Würmelein und	—	SATB hymn	Schein	—
855	illness	Hie lieg ich armes Würmelein kan	Moller	→p. 853		—
855	illness	Hie lieg ich armes Würmelein kan	Moller	→p. 505		—
856	smooth end	Herr Jesu Christ, ich weiß gar wohl	Ringwaldt	→p. 520		—
856	smooth end	Herr Jesu Christ, ich weiß gar wohl	Ringwaldt	SATB hymn	Schein	—
859	death and dying	Herr Jesu Christ..., dein Leiden	Leon	→p. 853		—
859	death and dying	Herr Jesu Christ..., dein Leiden	Leon	→p. 505		—
860	Psalm 90	Ach wie elend ist unser Zeit	Gigas	→p. 609		—
860	Psalm 90	Ach wie elend ist unser Zeit	Gigas	→p. 698		—
860	Psalm 90	Ach wie elend ist unser Zeit	Gigas	SATB hymn	Schein	—
862	consolation	Ich armer Mensch gar nichtes bin	Leon	→p. 863		—
862	agony	O Herre Gott in meiner Not	Selnecker	—		—
863	blessed end	Herr Jesu Christ, wahr Mensch...	Eber	SATB hymn	Schein	Laetare; Judica; Trinity XXIV
866	death and dying	Ich hab mein Sach...	Pappus	SATB hymn	—	—
870	capital punishment	O Welt, ich muß dich lassen	—	SATB hymn	Schein	—
873	trials and temptations	Herr Jesu Christ, ich schrei zu dir	—	→p. 856		—
873	trials and temptations	Herr Jesu Christ, ich schrei zu dir	—	→p. 520		—
873	trials and temptations	Herr Jesu Christ, ich schrei zu dir	—	SATTB	—	—
877	death and dying	Es ist doch in diesem Leben...	—	SATB hymn	—	—
880	Mark 10 (small children)	Lasset die Kindlein kommen zu...	Becker	SATB hymn	Schein	—
882	Media vita	Mitten wir im Leben sind	Luther (transl.)	SATB hymn	Schein	Trinity XVI/XXIV
886	Munde maligne, vale	Valet will ich dir geben	Herberger	→p. 846		—
886	Munde maligne, vale	Valet will ich dir geben	Herberger	→p. 762		—
888	John George I, last words	Meinen Jesum laß ich nicht	Keymann	SATB hymn	Hammerschmidt	—
893	death and dying	Jesum hab ich mir erwehlet	Kirchenbitter	SATB hymn	Hammerschmidt	—
896	death and dying	Herr ich denck an jene Zeit	—	SATB hymn	—	—
898	surrender to God's will	Herr, wie du wilt, so schicks mit...	—	→p. 698		—
902	death and dying	Mein Herr und Gott, wenn ich...	—	SATB hymn	—	—
904	Funeral of small children	So fahr ich hin mit Freuden	Schein	→p. 880		—
904	Funeral of small children	So fahr ich hin mit Freuden	Schein	→p. 806		—
905	death and dying	O treuer Jesu der du bist	—	SSATB	Vopelius	—
908	Job 19; Johann Wilhelm	Ich weiß, daß mein Erlöser lebt	Trinity XXIV	SATB hymn	Burck	—
912	death and dying	O wie selig seid ihr doch, ihr...	Dach	SATB hymn	—	—
914	death and dying	Was ist doch der Menschen Leben	—	SATB hymn	Hammerschmidt	—
918	death and dying	In Christi Wunden schlaf ich ein	—	→p. 721		—
918	death and dying	Freu dich sehr, o meine Seele	—	SATB hymn	Schein	—
921	death and dying	Herr Jesu Christ..., dein Leiden	Leon	→p. 853		—
921	death and dying	Herr Jesu Christ..., dein Leiden	Leon	→p. 505		—
922	death and dying	Allein nach dir, Herr Jesu Christ	Selnecker	SATB hymn	Gesius	—
926	funerals	Nun lasst uns den Leib begraben	Weiße	SATB hymn	Schein	—
928	death and dying	Geliebten Freund, was tut ihr so...	—	→p. 456		—
928	death and dying	Geliebten Freund, was tut ihr so...	—	→p. 453		—
930	Iam moesta quiesce...	Jam moesta quiesce querela	Prudentius	SATB hymn	Schein	—
932	Iam moesta quiesce...	Hört auf mit trauren und klagen	Herman (trsl.)	SATB hymn	Schein	—
933	death and dying	Hie lieg ich in der Erden Schoos	—	SATB hymn	—	—
936	death and dying	Aus der Tiefen rufe ich, Herr...	—	SATB hymn	—	—
938	death and dying	Lasset ab ihr meine Lieben	—	→p. 918		—
938	death and dying	Lasset ab ihr meine Lieben	—	→p. 767		—
940	death and dying	Gott Lob die Stund ist kommen	—	→p. 870		—
942	death and dying	Christus, der ist mein Leben	—	SATB hymn	—	—
943	death and dying	Ach lieben Christen trauret nicht	—	→p. 933		—
944	death and dying	Ach wie flüchtig, ach wie nichtig	Franck, M.	SATB hymn	—	—
947	consolation for the dying	Welt ade, ich bin dein...	—	SSATB	Rosenmüller	—
952	song of triumph	Mein Leben war ein Streit mit...	Rappolt	SSATB	Schelle	—
956	death and eternal life	O Jesu Christ, meins...	Behm	→p. 126		Laetare; Judica
956	death and eternal life	O Jesu Christ, meins...	Behm	→p. 754		Laetare; Judica
956	death and eternal life	O Jesu Christ, meins...	Behm	SATB hymn	—	Laetare; Judica
960	death and dying	O Gott der du mit grosser Macht	Rist	SATB hymn	—	—
964	death and dying	Mein Gott, erbärmlich lieg ich hier	—	→p. 960		—
965	death and dying	Nun lieg ich armes Würmelein	Schirmer	SATB hymn	Crüger	—
968	death and dying	Ach wenn kommet doch die...	—	→p. 918		—
969	death and dying	Lasset ab von euren Thränen	—	→p. 578		—
971	death and dying	Allenthalben wo ich gehe	—	SATB hymn	—	—
973	death and dying	O Jesu Gottes Lämmelein	Moller	→p. 956		—
974	death and dying	Ich war ein kleines Kindlein	—	→p. 846		—
974	death and dying	Ich war ein kleines Kindlein	—	SATB hymn	—	—
976	death and dying	Alle Menschen...	—	—		—
977	temporality's imperfection	Ach was ist doch unser Leben	—	SATB hymn	Briegel (mel.)	—
980	death and dying	Du, o schönes Weltgebäude	Franck, J.	SATB hymn	Crüger	—
982	death and dying	Es ist genug	—	SATB hymn	—	—
985	Psalm 42	So wünsch ich nun eine gute...	Nicolai	—		—
987	death and dying	Jesu, dein will ich sein weil ich...	—	SATB hymn	—	—
989	death and dying	Ach, was soll ich...	—	SATB hymn	—	—
992–1017	Vom Jüngsten Tage und...	(↑ Go to top of table ↑)				—
992	Matthew 24		Alberus	SATB hymn	—	Advent II; Trinity XXV
996	Last Judgment	Es ist gewißlich an der Zeit	Ringwaldt	→p. 616		Advent II; Trinity XXVI
997	joy	Frisch auf und lasst uns singen	Rist	SSATB	Scheidemann	—
1002	end of time; Boh. Brethren	Es wird schier der letzte Tag...	Weiße (transl.)	SATB hymn	Schein	Trinity XXV/XXVI
1006	eternity	O Ewigkeit, du Donnerwort	Rist	SATB hymn	Schop	—
1009	end of time & eternal life	Herzlich thut mich erfreuen	Walter	—		—
1013	end of time & eternal life	Ach Gott thu dich erbarmen	Alberus	SATB hymn	—	Trinity I/XXV
1018–23	Litaney	(↑ Go to top of table ↑)				—
1018	litany	Kyrie Eleison... Erhöre uns	Luther (transl.)	SSATB	Schein	—
1024–27	Wiegen-Lieder	(↑ Go to top of table ↑)				—
1024	lullaby	Nun schlaf mein liebes Kindelein	Mathesius	SATB hymn	Schein	—
1026	child Jesus	Hört ihr liebsten Kinderlein	Herman	→p. 589		—
1027–29	Hochzeit-Lied	(↑ Go to top of table ↑)				—
1027	Marriage at Cana (John 2)	Am dritten Tag ein Hochzeit ward	Spangen., C.	→p. 616		Epiphany II
1029–36	Von den dreyen ...ständen	(↑ Go to top of table ↑)				—
1029	three estates; John Casimir	Jesu wollst uns weisen	—	SATB hymn	Schein	—
1034	three estates	Drei Ständ hat Gott der Herr	Schein	SATB hymn	—	—
1036–72	Gesänge für... Gregorian-...	(↑ Go to top of table ↑)				—
1036	elegiacum	Vos ad se pueri primis invitat ab...	Melanchthon	SATB chant	Schein	—
1038	Gregorian chant	Ihr Alten pflegt zu sagen	Helmbold	SATB chant	Schein	—
1041	song of praise	Gelobet und gepreiset sei Gott...	—	SATB chant	Schein	—
1042	Gregorian chant	Daß noch viel Menschen werden	—	SATB chant	Schein	—
1044	Gregorian chant	Herr Gott, du bist von Ewigkeit	Helmbold	SATB chant	Schein	—
1047	Gregorian chant	Höret ihr Eltern Christus spricht	Helmbold	SATB chant	Burck	—
1049	Aufer immensam	Aufer immensam, Deus, aufer...	Thym/Melanch.	SATB chant	Schein	—
1052	Aufer immensam	Aufer immensam, Deus, aufer...	Thym/Melanch.	SATB chant	—	—
1053	Aufer immensam	Gott, laß vom Zorne	Reim. (transl.)	SATB chant	Hammerschmidt	—
1055	Aufer immensam	Herr, deinen Zorn wend ab von...	—	→p. 451		—
1056	Gregorian chant	Inventor rutili dux bone luminis	Prudentius	SATB chant	Bodenschatz	—
1058	Gregorian chant	Curarum nihil invenitur expers	—	SATB chant	—	—
1060	Gregorian chant	A deo scirem nisi me creatum	—	SATB chant	—	—
1062	special requests	Gott in allen meinen Sachen	—	SATB chant	—	—
1066	elegiacum	Clare vir o Musarum	—	SATB chant	—	—
1071	defense of the church	Serva Deus verbum tuum	—	SATB chant	—	—
1073–104	Anhang	(↑ Go to top of table ↑)				—
1074	vespers (intonatio)	Deus in adjutorium meum...	—	chant	—	—
1074	vespers (intonatio)	Deus in adjutorium meum...	—	SATB chant	—	—
1077	collects (intonatio)	Dominus vobiscum	—	chant	—	—
1078	collects (intonatio)	Dominus vobiscum	—	SATB chant	—	—
1079	Gospel reading (intonatio)	Dominus vobiscum	—	chant	—	high feast
1080	Gospel reading (intonatio)	Dominus vobiscum	—	SSATTB	—	high feast
1084	preface (high feasts)	Sanctus	—	chant	—	—
1085	preface (high feasts)	Sanctus	—	chant	—	—
1086	preface (high feasts)	Dominus vobiscum; Sanctus	—	SATB chant	—	—
1088	preface (high feasts)	Dominus vobiscum; Sanctus	—	SSATTB	—	—
1098	Kyrie	Kyrie, Gott Vater in Ewigkeit	—	SATB chant	—	—
1102	Benedicamus	Benedicamus Domino	—	chant	—	—
1102	Ave Jesu, summe bonus	Sey gegrüsset Jesu gütig	Keymann (trsl.)	SSB	—	—

=== Reception ===
The Neu Leipziger Gesangbuch was one of the last important hymnals in the Kantional format (i.e. printed with music, including part-songs): congregational singing was generally becoming monodic, with an instrumental accompaniment, for which hymnals with only texts became the new standard.

In his Leipzig time (1723–1750), Johann Sebastian Bach used the Neu Leipziger Gesangbuch as a reference work for many of his sacred compositions. For the closing chorales of his cantatas BWV 27 and BWV 43 he used the harmonisation as found in the hymnal. For other chorale settings, such as BWV 281, he stayed close to the harmonisation published by Vopelius.

== Later editions of the Leipziger Gesangbuch ==
In 1693 Vopelius published the Leipziger Gesangbuch, which he describes as a republication of the Neu Leipziger Gesangbuch, however without the chorale settings, but with more hymns, and enriched with engravings. The next edition appeared in 1707. Later editions of the Leipziger Gesangbuch, in 1729, 1733 and 1752, further enlarged the number of hymns, to 852, 856 and 1015 respectively, and referred to Vopelius as the former editor of the hymnal. The 1758 and 1767 editions kept the number of hymns at 1015, keeping also the referral to Vopelius as former editor on the title page.

== See also ==
- List of hymns by Martin Luther
