= Ein Lämmlein geht und trägt die Schuld =

Lutheran hymn for Passiontide by Paul Gerhardt

- Lutheran Passion hymn
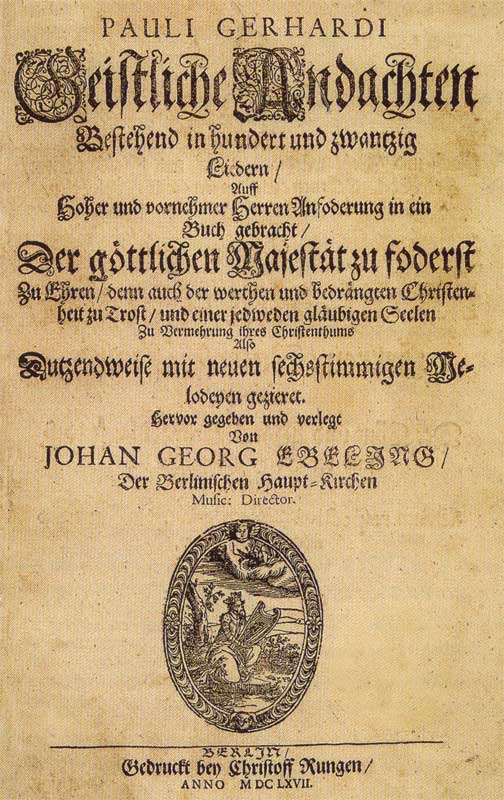
- 1667 edition of 120 hymns by Paul Gerhardt, which contains "Ein Lämmlein geht und trägt die Schuld" as its first item.
- English: A Lambkin goes and bears the guilt
- Occasion: Passiontide
- Text: by Paul Gerhardt
- Language: German
- Melody: "An Wasserflüssen Babylon"
- Published: 1647

"Ein Lämmlein geht und trägt die Schuld" (A Lambkin goes and bears the guilt) is a Lutheran Passion hymn in German by Paul Gerhardt. The hymn text was first published in Johann Crüger's Praxis Pietatis Melica, starting from the lost 1647 edition. Wolfgang Dachstein's 16th-century "An Wasserflüssen Babylon" melody is commonly indicated as its hymn tune, although other settings exist.

From the late 17th century Gerhardt's hymn text is used in larger vocal works such as Passion settings. With Dachstein's hymn tune it is included in the Protestant hymnal Evangelisches Gesangbuch.

== History ==
Paul Gerhardt's "Ein Lämmlein geht und trägt die Schuld" was first published in 1647, in a lost edition of Johann Crüger's Praxis Pietatis Melica. The earliest extant print of the hymn, in the Praxis Pietatis Melica of 1648, indicates Wolfgang Dachstein's 16th-century "An Wasserflüssen Babylon" melody as its singing tune:

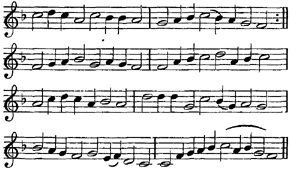

The hymn was originally used as a communion song. Later it was described as "the masterpiece of all Passion hymns".

== Words ==
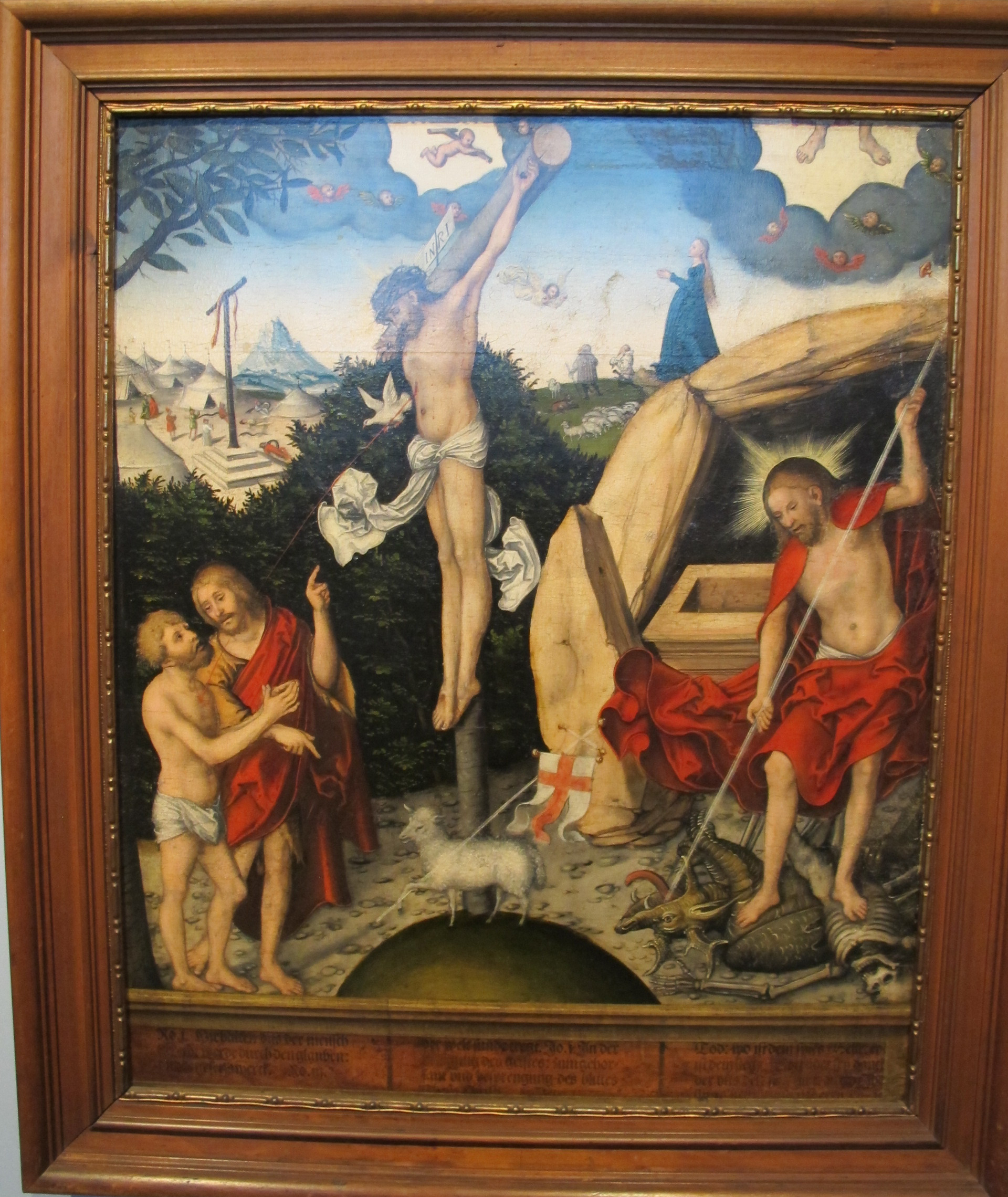
Lucas Cranach the Elder, "Grace" panel of the Allegorie auf Gesetz und Gnade painting (16th century), picturing the Lamb of God, and referring in its inscription to John 1:29

"Ein Lämmlein geht und trägt die Schuld" has been characterised as a paraphrase of the Agnus Dei. The hymn text is based on Isaiah 53:4–7 and John 1:29. The hymn is in 10 stanzas of ten lines. The first four stanzas reflect on the Passion of Christ and the last four stanzas reflect on the believer's participation by receiving the sacrifice in form of the Eucharist. The two middle stanzas are a transition in which the singer turns in devotion to remembering the sacrifice.

English translations of the hymn include "A Lamb goes uncomplaining forth".

== Music ==
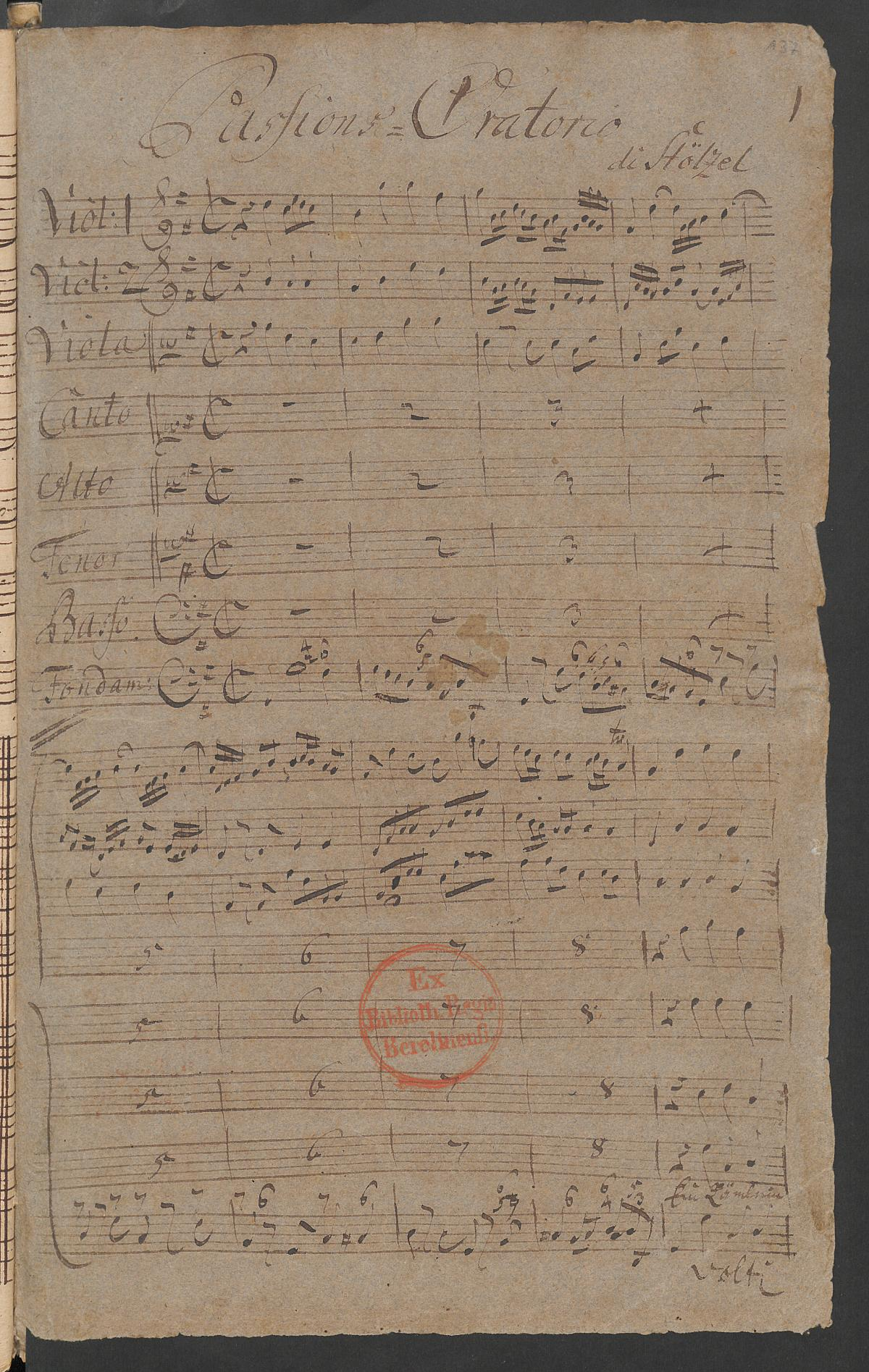
First page of a manuscript copy from around 1750 of Gottfried Heinrich Stölzel's Ein Lämmlein geht und trägt die Schuld Passion oratorio (1720)

After the mid-17th century Dachstein's "An Wasserflüssen Babylon" hymn tune, Zahn No. 7663, was commonly named "Ein Lämmlein geht und trägt die Schuld". With this tune, the hymn has been included in several hymnals, such as Christian Friedrich Witt's Neues Cantional and the Evangelisches Gesangbuch, where it is numbered EG 83. Gerhardt's hymn was however also sung to the tune of "Herr Gott, erhöre die Gerechtigkeit", Zahn No. 7669, and several other melodies were composed for the text: Johannes Zahn lists three 17th-century melodies composed for "Ein Lämmlein geht und trägt die Schuld" (Nos. 7681–7683), three from the 18th century (Nos. 7684–7686, the first of which was composed for a reworked version of the text), and two from the 19th century (Nos. 7687–7688).

The third part of a Passion setting presented in Rudolstadt in 1688 opens with Gerhardt's "Ein Lämmlein geht und trägt die Schuld" in the format of an aria, using the "An Wasserflüssen Babylon" melody. Reinhard Keiser was the first composer who used Gerhardt's hymn in a Passion oratorio in Hamburg: his 1711 setting of Johann Ulrich König's Thränen unter dem Creutze Jesus libretto opens with it. The second part of Johann Friedrich Fasch's setting of the Brockes Passion libretto, composed around 1717–1719, opens with a chorale adaptation of "Ein Lämmlein geht und trägt die Schuld". A Passion oratorio performed in Gotha in 1719 contained an aria based on an excerpt of Gerhardt's hymn.

In 1720, Gottfried Heinrich Stölzel composed a meditation of the stations of the Cross as a Passion oratorio which he titled Die leidende und am Creutz sterbende Liebe Jesu (The love of Jesus which suffered and died on the Cross), which is also known by its incipit, Ein Lämmlein geht und trägt die Schuld. Composed for Gotha, this oratorio knew many repeat performances, some of these in slightly modified versions: the oratorio was for instance performed in Leipzig in 1734, entitled Der Gläubigen Seele Geistliche Betrachtungen Ihres leidenden Jesu, directed by J. S. Bach, and, in 1736, in Rudolstadt and in Nürnberg.

Three Passions by Georg Philipp Telemann are also known by their incipit Ein Lämmlein geht und trägt die Schuld: a St Mark Passion of 1723, TWV 5:8, a St John Passion of 1745, TWV 5:30, and a St Matthew Passion of 1766, TWV 5:51. Ein Lämmlein geht und trägt die Schuld, GWV 1119/24, is a church cantata for the last Sunday before Lent (Estomihi) composed by Christoph Graupner in 1724. Johann Gottfried Walther set "Ein Lämmlein geht und trägt die Schuld" for organ. BWV 267 is Johann Sebastian Bach's chorale harmonisation of Dachstein's hymn tune. Carl Heinrich Graun composed a Passion named after the hymn, Ein Lämmlein geht und trägt die Schuld, GraunWV B:VII:4, for soloists, choir and orchestra, which has been called Kleine Passion (Little Passion), in comparison to his better-known Der Tod Jesu.

Gottfried August Homilius, a Kreuzkantor in Dresden, composed a Passion cantata for soloists, choir and orchestra, HoWV I.2, printed by Breitkopf in 1775. Like his St Matthew Passion, HoWV 1.3, it starts with the words "Ein Lämmlein geht und trägt die Schuld". Chorale preludes on "Ein Lämmlein geht und trägt die Schuld" were composed by Johann Christian Kittel, Gustav Flügel, Carl Steinhäuser and Philipp Wolfrum. Hugo Distler's Der Jahrkreis, Op. 5, contains an SSA setting of "Ein Lämmlein geht und trägt die Schuld".

== Sources ==
- Glöckner, Andreas (2009). "Ein weiterer Kantatenjahrgang Gottfried Heinrich Stölzels in Bachs Aufführungsrepertoire?" [Is there another cantata cycle by Gottfried Heinrich Stölzel that belonged to Bach’s performance repertoire?]. In Wollny, Peter (ed.). Bach-Jahrbuch 2009 [Bach Yearbook 2009]. Bach-Jahrbuch (in German). Vol. 95. Neue Bachgesellschaft. Leipzig: Evangelische Verlagsanstalt. pp. 95–115. doi:10.13141/bjb.v2009. ISBN 978-3-374-02749-1. ISSN 0084-7682.
- Schabalina, Tatjana (2008). "Texte zur Music in Sankt Petersburg: Neue Quellen zur Leipziger Musikgeschichte sowie zur Kompositions- und Aufführungstätigkeit Johann Sebastian Bachs" [Texte zur Music in Saint Petersburg: New sources on Leipzig's music history, including on Johann Sebastian Bach's compositional and performatory practices]. In Wollny, Peter (ed.). Bach-Jahrbuch 2008 [Bach Yearbook 2008]. Bach-Jahrbuch (in German). Vol. 94. Neue Bachgesellschaft. Leipzig: Evangelische Verlagsanstalt. pp. 99–122. doi:10.13141/bjb.v2008. ISBN 978-3-374-02668-5. ISSN 0084-7682.
- Scheitler, Irmgard (2005). Deutschsprachige Oratorienlibretti: von den Anfängen bis 1730 (in German). Schöningh. ISBN 3506729551.
