= St John Passion (disambiguation) =

St John Passion or, in Latin, Passio Domini Nostri Iesu Christi secundum Ioannem (The Passion of Our Lord Jesus Christ according to John), refers to the Passion of Christ as told in chapters 18 and 19 of the Gospel of John.

It also may refer to compositions based on that text:

- Passio Secundum Johannem by Johann Walter (c. 1530), published in Neu Leipziger Gesangbuch, p. 227ff
- Passio Domini Nostri Jesu Christi secundum Johannem (1557) by Cipriano de Rore
- Passio Secundum Johannem (1580) by Orlando di Lasso
- Historia der Passion und des Leidens unseres einigen Erlösers und Seligmachers Jesu Christi (1593) by Leonhard Lechner
- Passio Secundum Johannem by Teodoro Clinio (1595)
- St. John Passion (1605) by William Byrd
- Johannes Passion (1643) by Thomas Selle
- Johannes-Passion (1666) by Heinrich Schütz
- Passio Secundum Johannem by Alessandro Scarlatti
- St John Passion (1724) by Johann Sebastian Bach
- Johannes Passion, 11 settings among Georg Philipp Telemann's Passions (1725–1765)
- Johannes-Passion, attributed to George Frideric Handel
- Johannes-Passion (1748) by Georg Gebel (the younger)
- Johannes Passion, several settings among Carl Philipp Emanuel Bach's Passions (1772–1788)
- Passio (Pärt) (Passio Domini Nostri Jesu Christi secundum Joannem, 1982)
- Johannes-Passion (Gubaidulina) (2000)
- St John Passion (2008) by James MacMillan
