= St Matthew Passion (disambiguation) =

St Matthew Passion is a Passion setting composed by Johann Sebastian Bach in 1727 or 1729

- St Matthew Passion structure

St Matthew Passion may also refer to the following musical compositions:

- Passio Secundum Matthæum by Jacob Obrecht in 1471
- Passio Secundum Matthæum by Johann Walter (c. 1530), published in Neu Leipziger Gesangbuch, p. 179
- Passio Secundum Matthæum by Orlando di Lasso in 1575
- Matthäus-Passion, by Johannes Heroldt 1594
- Matthäus-Passion, by Heinrich Schütz in 1666
- Matthäus-Passion, 13 settings among Georg Philipp Telemann's Passions
- Matthäus-Passion, 6 settings among Carl Philipp Emanuel Bach's Passions
- Matthäus-Passion, several settings by Johann Heinrich Rolle
- Matthäuspassion (Homilius)
- Matthäus-Passion, by Johann Valentin Meder
- Matthäus-Passion, by Johann Christoph Rothe (1653–1700)
- Matthäus-Passion, by Christoph Demantius
- Matthäus-Passion, by Johann Sebastiani
- St Matthew Passion by Hilarion Alfeyev in 2006
- St Matthew Passion, by James MacMillan
- Passio Secundum Matthæum by Trond Hans Farner Kverno

It may also refer to:

- Saint Matthew Passion, a film by Tamás Czigány

== See also ==
- Gospel of Matthew
- Passion (Christianity)
- Passion (music)
- Passions (Bach)
