= Preface (liturgy) =

Prayer in Christian liturgies

In Christian liturgy the preface is a formal thanksgiving that immediately precedes (or forms part of) the Canon, Eucharistic Prayer, Prayer of Consecration or analogous portion of the Eucharist (Holy Communion, Mass or Divine Liturgy). The preface, which begins at the words, "It is very meet and just, right and salutary" (or a variation thereof) is ushered in, in all liturgies, with the Sursum corda ("Lift up your hearts") and ends with the Sanctus ("Holy, Holy, Holy").

In most Western liturgies, proper prefaces are appointed for particular occasions. In the various Eastern liturgies there is great variation. Among those who follow the Rite of Constantinople the audible portion of the preface does not change, but the silent prayer said by the priest will differ depending upon whether it is the Liturgy of St. John Chrysostom or the Liturgy of St. Basil the Great. Among the Oriental Orthodox Churches the preface will take different forms, depending upon the liturgical rite or the particular feast day.

== Anglican forms ==
In the 1662 Book of Common Prayer, the preface omits the Dominus vobiscum ("The Lord be with you") and is in the form:

Priest: Lift up your hearts.
People: We lift them up unto the Lord.

Priest: Let us give thanks unto our Lord God.
People: It is meet and right so to do.

Priest: It is very meet, right, and our bounden duty, that we should at all times, and in all places, give thanks unto thee, O Lord, Holy Father, Almighty, Everlasting God.
(A proper preface may follow for certain occasions)
Priest: Therefore with Angels and Archangels, and with all the company of heaven, we laud and magnify thy glorious Name; evermore praising thee, and saying:

Then the Sanctus is said or sung. In more modern orders of service, it is common for the Dominus vobiscum to introduce the Sursum corda.

== Methodist form ==
In Methodism, the preface opens as follows, in accordance with the Book of Worship:

Elder: The Lord be with you.
People: And also with you.
Elder: Lift up your hearts.
People: We lift them up to the Lord.
Elder: Let us give thanks to the Lord our God.
People: It is right to give our thanks and praise. (At this point, the Elder gives a proper preface)

== Byzantine form ==
In the Byzantine Rite, the preface opens with the following:

	Greek original	English translation
Deacon	Ἂς σταθοῦμε καλά· ἂς σταθοῦμε μὲ φόβο· ἂς προσέξουμε νὰ προσφέρωμε τὴν ἁγία ἀναφορὰ μὲ εἰρήνη.	Let us stand well; let us stand with fear; let us attend, that we may offer the Holy Oblation in peace.
People	Εἰρηνικὴ ἡ ἀγάπη μας, δοξαστικὴ ἡ θυσία μας.	A mercy of peace, a sacrifice of praise.
Priest	Ἡ χάρη τοῦ Κυρίου μας Ἰησοῦ Χριστοῦ, καὶ ἡ ἀγάπη τοῦ Θεοῦ καὶ Πατέρα, καὶ ἡ ἑνότητα τοῦ Ἁγίου Πνεύματος ἂς εἶναι μὲ ὅλους σας.	The grace of our Lord Jesus Christ, and the love of God the Father, and the communion of the Holy Spirit, be with you all.
People	Καὶ μὲ τὸ πνεῦμα σου.	And with thy spirit.
Priest	Ἂς ὑψώσουμε πρὸς τὸ Θεὸ τὶς καρδιές μας.	Let us lift up our hearts.
People	Ἔχομε τὴν καρδιά μας στραμμένη στὸ Θεό.	We lift them up unto the Lord.
Priest	Ἂς εὐχαριστήσουμε τὸν Κύριο.	Let us give thanks unto the Lord.
People	Ἀξίζει καὶ πρέπει.	It is meet and right.
		(to worship the Father, and the Son, and the Holy Spirit, the Trinity one in essence and undivided.)

== Lutheran forms ==
In Lutheran liturgies, the preface has many different translations that can be used in the Divine Service. The following is a common form:

Pastor: The Lord be with you.
People: And also with you.

Pastor: Lift up your hearts.
People: We lift them up to the Lord.

Pastor: Let us give thanks to the Lord our God.
People: It is right to give him thanks and praise.

== Roman Catholic form ==
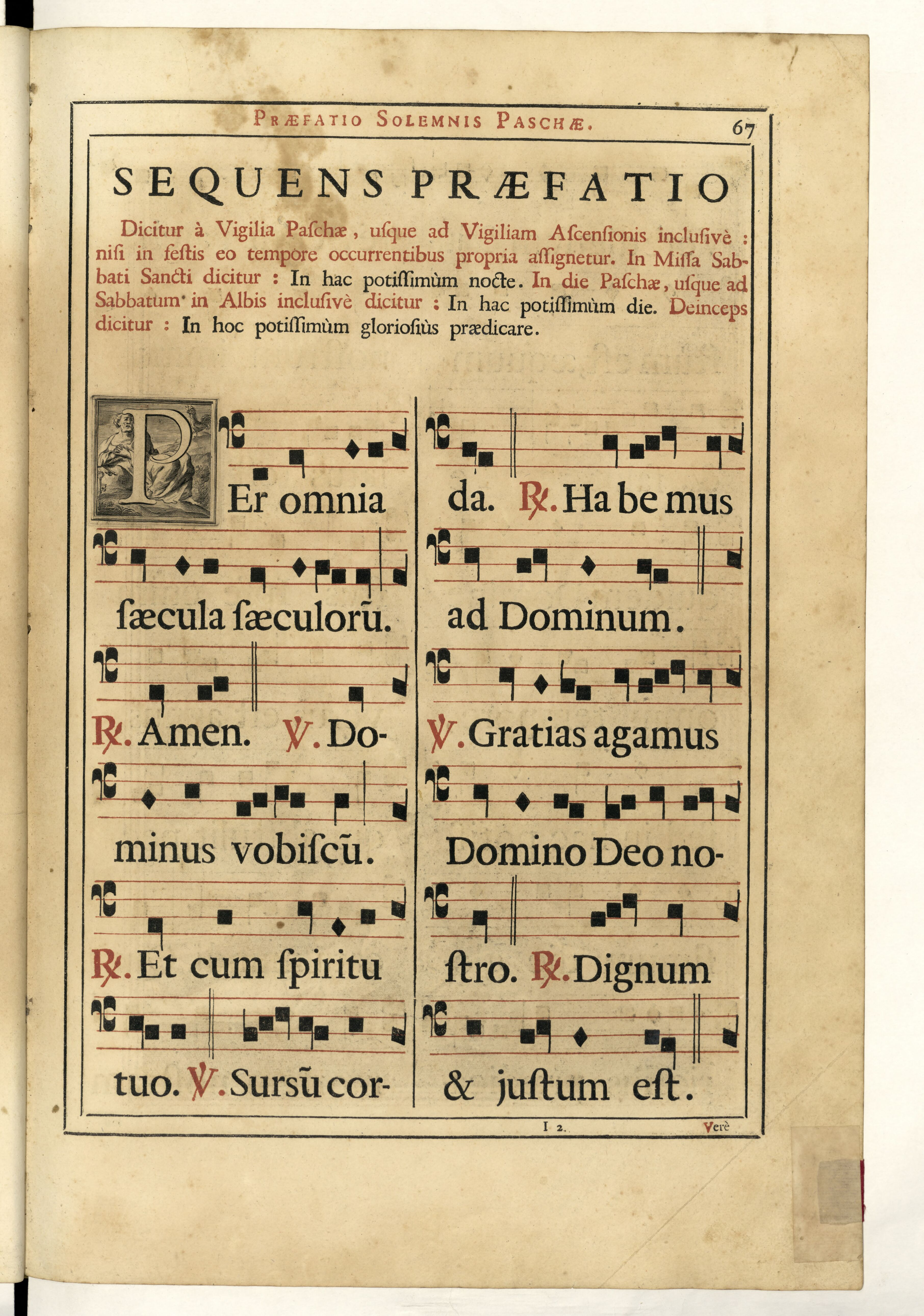
The opening dialogue (Canon Missae Pontificalis, 1729)

In the Roman Rite, the preface opens with the following:

Priest: Dominus vobiscum.
People: Et cum spiritu tuo.

Priest: Sursum corda.
People: Habemus ad Dominum.

Priest: Gratias agamus Domino Deo nostro.
People: Dignum et justum est.

The current English translation has:

Priest: The Lord be with you.
People: And with your spirit.

Priest: Lift up your hearts.
People: We lift them up to the Lord.

Priest: Let us give thanks to the Lord, our God.

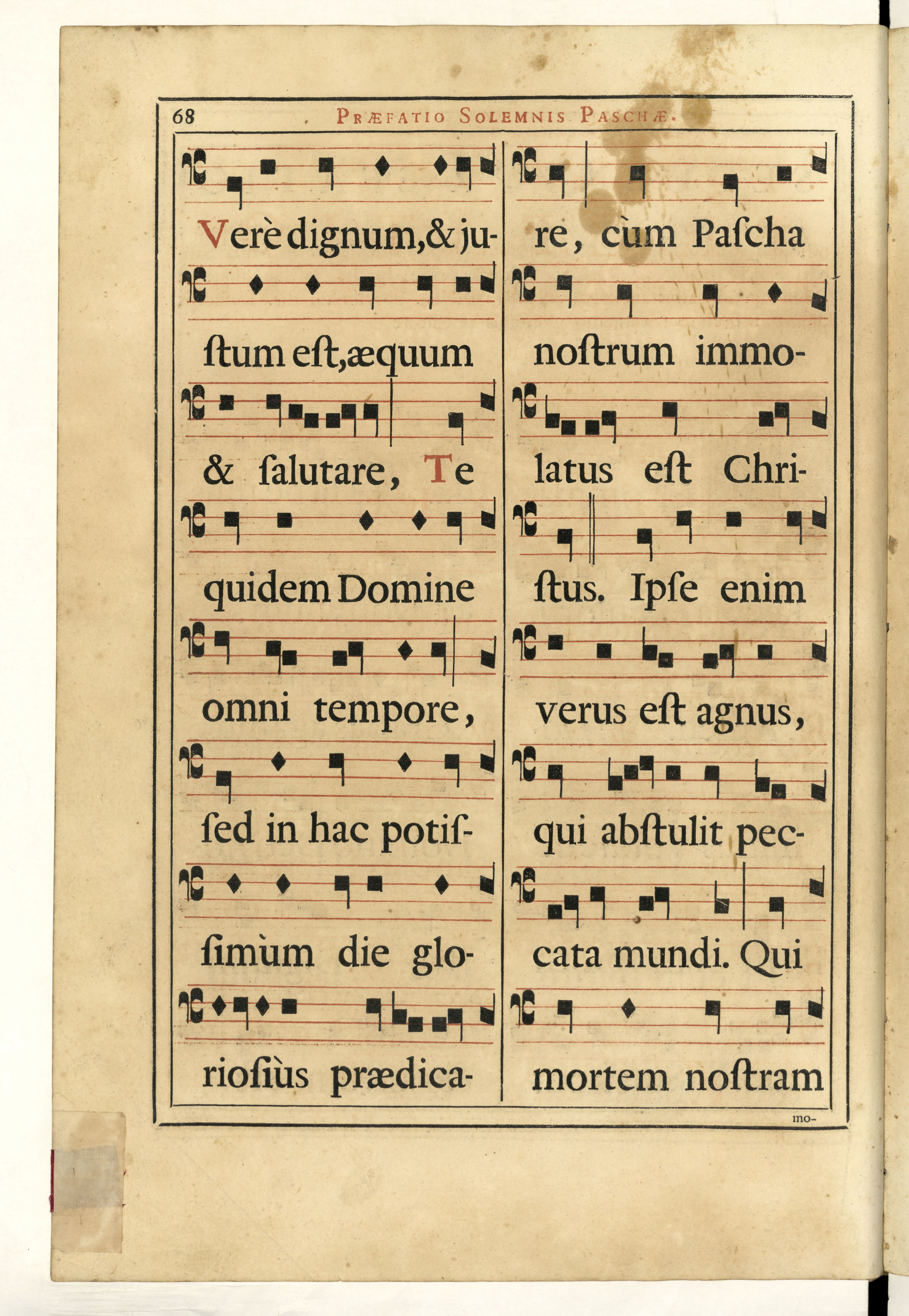
Preface of Easter with musical notation (Canon Misae Pontificalis, 1729)

People: It is right and just.

There are a wide variety of proper prefaces for every mass, depending on the missal used. As an example, a preface appointed for masses in the first Sunday in Advent is:

Vere dignum et justum est, æquum et salutare, nos tibi semper et ubique gratias agere: Domine, sancte Pater, omnipotens æterne Deus: per Christum Dominum nostrum.
Qui, primo adventu in humilitate carnis assumptæ, dispositionis antiquæ munus implevit, nobisque salutis perpetuæ tramitem reseravit: ut, cum secundo venerit in suæ gloria maiestatis, manifesto demum munere capiamus, quod vigilantes nunc audemus exspectare promissum.
Et ideo cum Angelis et Archangelis, cum Thronis et Dominationibus, cumque omni militia cælestis exercitus, hymnum gloriæ tuæ canimus, sine fine dicentes:

In English:

It is truly right and just, our duty and our salvation, always and everywhere to give you thanks, Lord, holy Father, almighty and eternal God, through Christ our Lord.
For he assumed at his first coming the lowliness of human flesh, and so fulfilled the design you formed long ago, and opened for us the way to eternal salvation, that, when he comes again in glory and majesty and all is at last made manifest, we who watch for that day may inherit the great promise in which now we dare to hope.
And so, with Angels and Archangels, with Thrones and Dominions, and with all the hosts and Powers of heaven, we sing the hymn of your glory, as without end we acclaim:
