= Teodoro Clinio =

Italian composer

Teodoro Clinio (1548 in Venice – April 1601 in Treviso) was an Italian composer.

== Works ==
- Passio secundum Joannem - recorded by Ensemble Triagonale, Michael Paumgarten, with German passion by Johannes Herold CPO, 2015
