= Johannes Herold =

German composer

- Born: c. 1550; Jena, Germany
- Died: 8 September 1603; Weimar, Germany
- Occupation: Composer
- Era: Renaissance
- Notable work: Historia des Leidens und Sterbens unsers Herrn und Heylandts Jesu Christi (1594)
- Style: Renaissance sacred music

Johannes Heroldt (around 1550 in Jena - September 8, 1603 in Weimar) was a German composer best known for his six-part St Matthew Passion composed at Klagenfurt in 1594.

== Works, editions and recordings ==
- "Historia des Leidens und Sterbens unsers Herrn und Heylandts Jesu Christi aus dem hlg. Evangelio Mattheo", mit 6 Stimmen componirt; Grätz in Steyer bei Georg Widmannstetter, 1594, Graz 1594; edition Hans Joachim Moser - 1955
- Historia, with Joachim a Burck Johannespassion and Christoph Demantius Passion. recorded by Michel Laplénie, Erato 1990
- Historia, with Teodoro Clinio Passio secundum Joannem - recorded by Ensemble Triagonale, Michael Paumgarten CPO, 2015
