= Johann Kolross =

German poet and educator

Johann Kolross (also Johannes Kolrose, Latinized Rhodonthracius, c. 1487 – c. 1560) was a poet, philologist and educator of the German Renaissance and the Protestant Reformation. He studied in Freiburg, and worked as rector of the boys' school in Basel from 1529. He published the Enchiridion, a textbook on orthography, in 1530.

He was known for his popular theatre plays, his Spil von Fünfferley betrachtnussen was performed in Basel in 1530.

He also wrote a number of hymns for the Protestant church service, including an adaptation of Psalm 127 (Wo Gott zum Haus nicht gibt sein Gunst ).
