= Erhard Bodenschatz =

German pastor, cantor and composer

Erhard Bodenschatz (1576 in Lichtenberg – 1636 in Groß-Osterhausen) was a German pastor, cantor and composer. He was cantor at Schulpforta from 1600 to 1603 and pastor in Groß-Osterhausen/Querfurt from 1608 onwards.

He produced several motets. Among his best known works was the edited motet collection Florilegium Portense, meaning "Schulpforta's anthology". It was published in two volumes in Leipzig in 1618 and 1621 and held 365 motets by 58 composers, giving a good insight into the 17th century choral repertoire in Saxony and Thuringia. Johann Sebastian Bach is known to have been familiar with the work, using it and ordering further copies for the Thomanerchor whilst he was Thomaskantor.

== Bibliography ==
- Arrey von Dommer: Bodenschatz, Erhard. In: Allgemeine Deutsche Biographie (ADB). Band 3, Duncker & Humblot, Leipzig 1876, S. 6 f.
- Otto Riemer: Bodenschatz, Erhard. In: Neue Deutsche Biographie (NDB). Band 2, Duncker & Humblot, Berlin 1955, ISBN 3-428-00183-4, S. 354 f. (Digitalisat).
- [[:de:Biographisch-Bibliographisches Kirchenlexikon|Friedrich Wilhelm Bautz: Bodenschatz, Erhard. In: Biographisch-Bibliographisches Kirchenlexikon (BBKL). Band 1, Bautz, Hamm 1975. 2., unveränderte Auflage Hamm 1990, ISBN 3-88309-013-1, Sp. 651–652.]]
