= Dominus vobiscum =

Christian salutation and blessing

Solemn chant tones of the Dominus vobiscum, from the Liber Usualis. A bishop says "Pax vobis" ("Peace to you") instead.

Dominus vobiscum (Latin: "The Lord be with you") is an ancient salutation and blessing traditionally used by the clergy in the Masses of the Catholic Church and other liturgies, as well as liturgies of other Western Christian denominations, such as Lutheranism, Anglicanism and Methodism.

== Usage ==
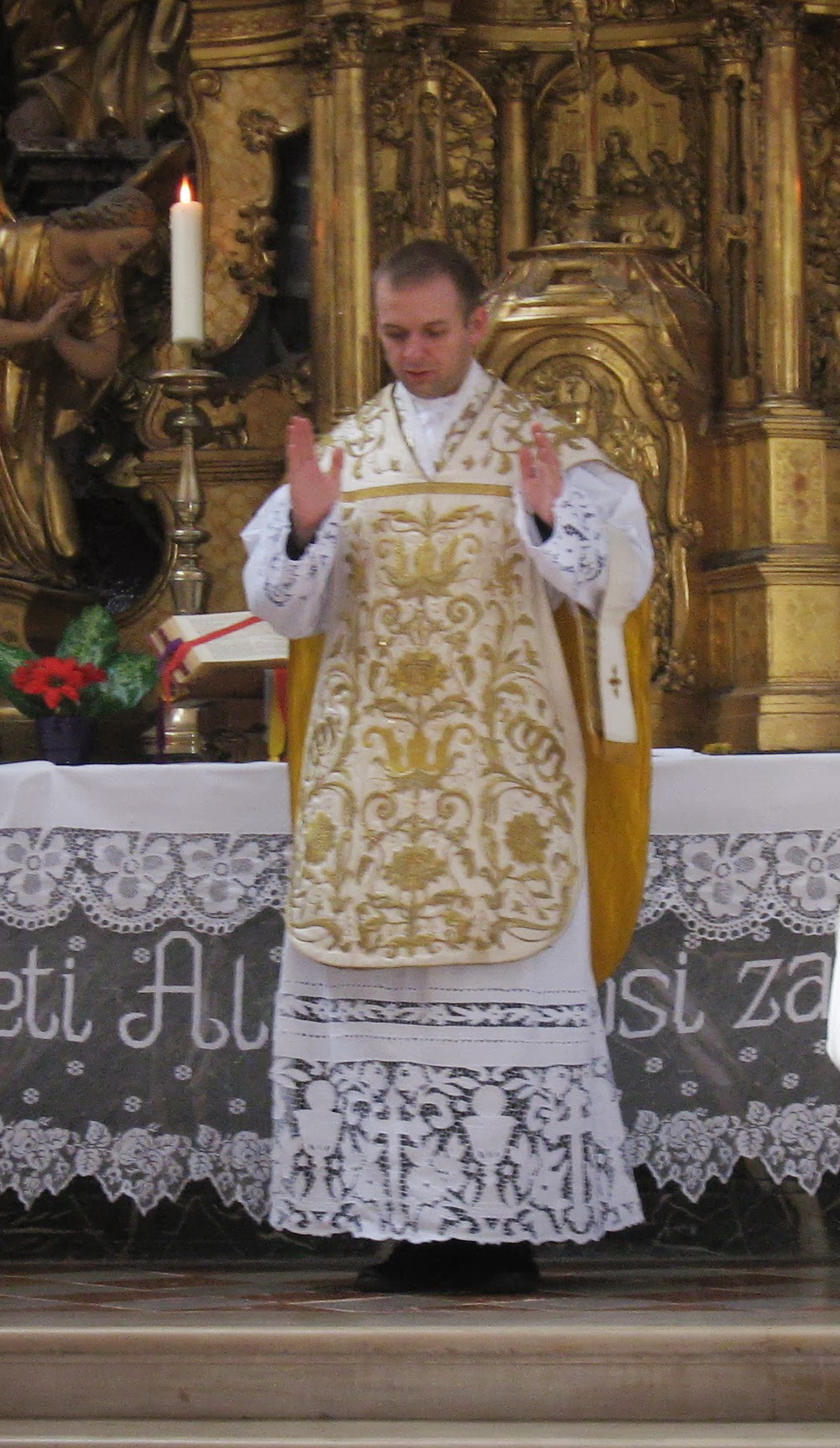
A priest saying Dominus vobiscum while celebrating a Tridentine Mass

The response is Et cum spíritu tuo, meaning "And with your spirit." Some English translations, such as Divine Worship: The Missal and the Anglican Book of Common Prayer, translate the response in the older form, "And with thy spirit." Eastern Orthodox churches also follow this usage, although the episcopal and presbyteral blessing are one and the same; in Greek, Εἰρήνη πᾶσι, eirene pasi, "peace to all." In the Roman Rite, this usage is only for the bishop, who says Pax vobís. The ICEL translation presently in use for Roman Catholic Masses in English has "And with your spirit."

Prior to Advent 2011, the Roman Catholic response in English-speaking countries was "And also with you." In 2001 the Holy See issued the instruction Liturgiam Authenticam concerning the use of vernacular languages in the Mass. The instruction requires that certain phrases, such as the response Et cum spíritu tuo, which "belong to the heritage of the whole or of a great part of the ancient Church, as well as others that have become part of the general human patrimony, are to be respected by a translation that is as literal as possible". Accordingly, the current translation of the Mass in English uses the response "And with your spirit" to reflect an accurate translation of the Latin.

Dóminus vobíscum is not usually said by anyone who is not at least a deacon. If introducing a prayer, it is otherwise replaced with Domine, exaudi orationem meam, with the response Et clamor meus ad te veniat (‘O Lord, hear my prayer’, And let my cry come to thee’, the opening verse of Psalm 102) or, if that invocation is said in any case, it is omitted.

In a Mass celebrated by a bishop or some Eastern Catholic, Eastern Orthodox, Oriental Orthodox, or some Nestorian Orthodox priests, Dóminus vobíscum is instead replaced with some variation of Pax vobis or Pax vobíscum (Peace be with you) which is replied with either the Sign of the Cross or Et cum spíritu tuo depending on the Church and whether it is in a Mass, Divine Liturgy, or Holy Qurbana.

This exchange is also said in the Lutheran Divine Service. The Lutheran Book of Worship, released in 1978, used the phrase "And also with you." The Evangelical Lutheran Church in America's updated hymnal, Evangelical Lutheran Worship, retains this wording. The response in the Lutheran Service Book, used by the Lutheran Church–Missouri Synod (LCMS) and the Lutheran Church–Canada (LCC), was changed to "And with your spirit" in 2006, changing from "thy" to "your".

In some Jewish rites, a person called up to the Torah says Adonai immachem; the sense is identical.

In Arabic, Allah Maak, which means "May Allah be with you", is used as a farewell.

== Origins ==
The salutation is taken from the verses Ruth 2:4 and 2 Chronicles 15:2 in the Vulgate, the Latin translation of the Bible. In Ruth, the phrase appears in the sentence, "Et ecce ipse veniebat de Bethlehem dixitque messoribus: 'Dominus vobiscum'. Qui responderunt ei: 'Benedicat tibi Dominus'." ("Boaz himself came from Bethlehem and said to the harvesters, 'The Lord be with you!' and they replied, 'The Lord bless you!'").

II Chronicles recounts that Azariah, filled with the spirit of God, said, "Audite me, Asa et omnis Iuda et Beniamin! Dominus vobiscum, quia fuistis cum eo. Si quaesieritis eum, invenietur a vobis; si autem dereliqueritis eum, derelinquet vos." ("Hear me, Asa and all Judah and Benjamin! The LORD is with you when you are with him, and if you seek him he will be present to you; but if you abandon him, he will abandon you.")

The phrase additionally appears in Numbers 14:42: "Nolite ascendere: non enim est Dominus vobiscum: ne corruatis coram inimicis vestris." (Hebrew Ayn adonai b'qirb'chem) The expression in Hebrew means to be successful. It also occurs in 1 Samuel 17:37 where Saul tells David "Go and may the Lord be with you" (Lech va'adonai y'hiyeh im'cha).
