= Passions (Telemann) =

Passions by Georg Philipp Telemann

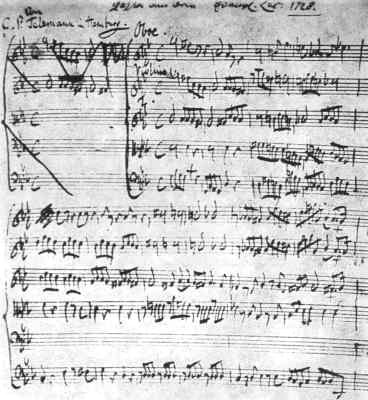
Telemann's manuscript for his 1728 St. Luke's Passion from the Deutsche Staatsbibliothek in Berlin.

Between 1716 and 1767, Georg Philipp Telemann wrote a series of Passions, musical compositions reflecting on Christ's Passion – the physical, spiritual and mental suffering of Jesus from the hours prior to his trial through to his crucifixion. The works were written for performance in German churches in the days before Easter. A prolific composer, Telemann wrote over 40 Passions for the churches of Hamburg alone, of which 22 have survived according to the present state of research. He also wrote several Passion oratorios. Unlike the Passions intended for liturgical performance, they were not closely set to the literal text of the Gospels.

== History ==
In his dissertation The Rise of Lyricism and the Decline of Biblical Narration in the Late Liturgical Passions of Georg Philipp Telemann (University of Pittsburgh, 2005), Jason Benjamin Grant describes the three basic periods of Telemann's Passion composition as follows:

I divide Telemann's liturgical Passions into three major periods, based on important developments in the history of the genre. The first period comprises the "early" works, composed 1722–36. These Passions include the full scope of the narratio (Vorbereitung and 5 acti). Of the fifteen works that Telemann composed in this period, only four are extant (4/15, approx. 20%): the 1723 St Mark, the 1728 St Luke, the 1730 St Matthew, and the 1733 St John. It is difficult to discuss norms and exceptions during this period when only four of these fifteen Passions are extant. Even so, based on the repertory as a whole, we can identify the 1730 St Matthew as the "norm" and the 1728 St Luke as the exception.

The second group comprises the "middle" works, composed 1737–54. These works use the (mostly) reduced narratio (minus the Vorbereitung and actus sepulcrum). Of the eighteen Passions Telemann composed during this period, sixteen were totally original works, and two were parodies: the 1738 St Matthew was a parody of the 1726 St Matthew (neither is extant), and the 1749 St John is a parody of the 1741 St John. Eight (recte: nine) works are extant from this period (8/18, about 44.4%): the 1737 St John, 1741 St John, 1744 St Luke, 1745 St John, 1746 St Matthew, 1748 St Luke, 1749 St John, and 1750 St Matthew. Outstanding among these are the 1745 St John and the 1748 St Luke. "Typical" works worthy of comment include the 1744 St Luke, 1746 St Matthew, and the two parodies.

During the second period, the narrative structure of the liturgical Passion underwent a significant change. After 1736, the narration of the Last Supper and of the Burial of Jesus (Entombment of Christ) was eliminated, leaving Gethsemane and Golgotha (Calvary) as the narrative bookends, the primary loci of the Passion story. The reduction of narration allowed the expansion of the poetic interpolations (chorales, arias, recitatives, and choruses), especially in the exordium and conclusio. Often these expanded sections contained a meditatio on aspects of the Last Supper, the Burial, and perhaps even allusions to the Resurrection of Jesus, events not recounted in the narratio.

The third period comprises the "late" works, composed 1755–67. Of the thirteen works Telemann composed during this period, eleven are extant (11/13, about 84.6%), the only lost works being the 1756 St Luke and the 1763 St Mark. Based on the percentage of surviving works alone, the late Passions invite a detailed study that allows for the comparison of several works. These Passions were composed in the wake of the great influx of concert oratorios, typified by their avoidance of narratio. Obviously the liturgical Passions could not do away with the narratio, but the impact of the new oratorios was strong indeed. These Passions typically include the expanded exordium and conclusio, extended chorale sequences (I define "chorale sequence" as a series of chorale movements, usually based on the same tune, often separated by a chorus or other poetic interpolation), poetic depiction of events, large accompagnati, and reprocessed narratio in the last few works.

== Style ==
Stylistically, there are many differences between these works by Telemann and Johann Sebastian Bach's Passions, there are however more similarities with the Passions of C.P.E. Bach. The Telemann Passions were (unlike J. S. Bach's Leipzig Passions) not written for and used in the context of a separate Good Friday Vespers liturgical service, but rather in the regular church services for the five main churches in Hamburg for the Sundays of Lent (except for Oculi Sunday). In deference to Ulrich Leisinger, who states in the Passions Preface in the Carl Philipp Emanuel Bach Complete Works edition:

The Hamburg Passions of the late eighteenth century are relatively short, lasting little more than an hour in performance, because they were used in regular Sunday services in Lent, not in the context of a separate Passion service, as in the Good Friday Vespers in Leipzig. According to Johann Mattheson, the traditional two-part division of the Passion, framing the sermon, was abandoned in 1755.

and quotes (he states) pages 656–657 of the 4th Vorrath (Volume) of Johann Mattheson's Plus Ultra, ein Stückwerk von neuer und mancherley Art. Hamburg never really adapted the bipartite division of Passion settings (Part 1 being before the Sermon and Part 2 after it). What had changed was that after 1736, the narration of the Last Supper and the Entombment were eliminated (although in some cases, even before 1736 the Last Supper was not used, for example in the St Mark Passion attributed to Keiser). These Hamburg Passions were whole entities performed in succession. Unlike those in Leipzig, where the division before and after the Sermon was retained. The other issue with Leisinger's statement is that he quotes from a volume by Mattheson that is now lost.

Another element that is different between Telemann's and Sebastian Bach's works is viewpoint. Telemann was not a "preacher" like Bach was, although he did have a theological background and education. Telemann's viewpoint was that of the Enlightenment, which placed less emphasis on Christ's divinity and more on his humanity (to the extent that in many arias in both Telemann's and Emanuel Bach's works, Christ is referred to as "Menschenfreund" ("Friend of Man")). They emphasize less Christ as the revelation of God's will for the world and revelation of prophecy and divine grace, less Christ the Word incarnate, less Christ the Lamb of God, and more Christ the man, the healer, the sufferer. In opposition to this is Bach the Fifth Evangelist, Bach the Mystic, Bach the Orthodox Lutheran. One way that this difference is evidenced is the way Telemann and Sebastian Bach approach the word of Scripture. Bach does not alter one iota of the scriptural word, he writes the words of Scripture in red ink, and generally his whole attitude is that Scripture is supreme. In opposition to this is Telemann, who treats Scripture in his own manner. He does not hold it as sacred (as evidenced by two facts: in the St Matthew Passion of 1738, a whole Gospel verse is replaced by an aria, and in the 1744 St Luke Passion, he changes the order of Scripture verses (specifically Luke 22:43–44) in Movement 2).

Finally, Telemann employs a more lyric style than Bach does. While there are places in Bach's Passions where he does employ more flourishes in the recitatives, these are usually few and far between. Bach usually uses a word-and-music form where the music is made to fit the words. Telemann, however, fits the words to the music that he writes, to the extent that many parts of recitatives are either elongated or repeated verbatim.

== Passion oratorios ==
Telemann wrote 6 Passion Oratorios (all of which were not used in the liturgy proper, but were still used in the church [either in the lesser churches or during the period between Judica Sunday and Good Friday, when it was traditional to have virtually non-stop Passion performances in the churches]).

His 1716 Passion oratorio Der für die Sünde der Welt gemarterte Jesus ("Jesus Who was martyred for the Sins of the World", TWV 5:1), used a poetic meditation on the passion story by Barthold Heinrich Brockes. Telemann himself wrote the text for his second Passion oratorio, Seliges Erwägen des bittern Leidens und Sterbens Jesu Christi ("Blessed Contemplation of the Bitter Suffering and Dying of Jesus Christ", TWV 5:2a, later reworked as TWV 5:2), which was one of the most beloved and frequently performed Passions in eighteenth-century Germany.

Year	TWV Number	Generic Name	Title	Librettist	Scoring	Notes
1716, rev. 1722	TWV 5:1	Der für die Sünde der Welt gemarterte und sterbende Jesus aus den IV. Evangelisten (Brockes-Paßion)	Mich vom Stricke meiner Sünden	Barthold Heinrich Brockes	SSSAATTBBB with 3 transverse flutes, recorder (Flauto dolce), 2 oboes, bassoon, Strings, violetta, and continuo	See also: Brockes Passion § Telemann Barfüßerkirche Frankfurt/Main, 10 April 1716; repeated during Lent in 1717 or 1718 in Hamburg or Augsburg (source Telemann 1718 Autobiography), on 26 March 1717 at the Neukirche Leipzig (1st documented performance of Passion Oratorio in Leipzig), 4 April 1719 at the Reventher Dom Hamburg, 21 March 1720 at the Hamburger Drillhaus, 60 movements in a Pastiche performed on 22, 26, 28, and 30 March 1722, Lenten Season 1723 in Hamburg(?), included in a series of performances of all four (at that time) known settings (Reinhard Keiser, Telemann, Georg Friedrich Händel, and Johann Mattheson) over four evenings in 1719, 1722, 1723, and 1730, and 27 March 1739 at the Nikolaikirche Leipzig (under direction of J. S. Bach.); Modern edition (Bärenreiter); Recorded — McGegan 1994 (reissued 1996 & 1999), Jacobs 2009
1722, perf. 1728	TWV 5:2a	Paßions-Oratorium: Seliges Erwägen des Leidens und Sterbens Jesu Christi	Schmücke dich, o liebe Seele	Georg Philipp Telemann	SATB with transverse flute, 2 oboes, Strings, and continuo	Hamburg version, composed Hamburg 1722, revised and performed first Hamburg Lent 1728; Modern edition (Bärenreiter)
1731	TWV 5:3	Die Bekerung des römischen Hauptmanns Cornelius	Mach dich auf, werde Licht!	A. J. Zell	****	Lost; Perf. Drillhaus Hamburg, 9 March 1731
1731	TWV 5:4	Die Kreutzigte Liebe oder Tränen über das Leiden und Sterben unseres Heilandes	Nicht das Band, das dich bestricket	Johann Ulrich von König	SATB with 2 transverse flutes, chalumeau, Oboe d'Amore, 2 Oboes, Strings, Violetta, and continuo	Perf. Drillhaus Hamburg, 9 March 1731(?); Recorded — Scholl 2004
1755	TWV 5:5	Betrachtung der 9. Stunde an dem Todestage Jesu	Erhole dich, o Sonne	Joachim Johann Daniel Zimmermann	ATB with 2 transverse flutes, Bass Oboe, 2 Horns, Strings, and continuo	perf. Lent 1755; Modern edition (Bärenreiter); Recorded — Max 1997 (reissued 2000)
1755	TWV 5:6	Der Tod Jesu (Paßions-Kantate)	Du, dessen Augen flossen	Karl Wilhelm Ramler	SAATBB with 2 transverse flutes, 2 recorders (flûte à bec), 2 Oboes, Oboe d'Amore, Bass Oboe, 2 Clarinets, 2 Bassoons, 2 Horns, Trumpet, Trombone, Strings, and continuo	Perf. Lent 1755; Modern edition (Bärenreiter); Recorded — Heyerick 1995 (reissued 2007), Rémy 2000 (reissued 2006), Schwarz 2012
1763	TWV 5:2	Paßions-Oratorium: Seliges Erwägen des Leidens und Sterbens Jesu Christi	Schmücke dich, o liebe Seele	Georg Philipp Telemann	SATB with 2 oboes, 2 chalumeaux, 2 bassoons, 2 horns, Strings and continuo	composed and performed Berlin, 3 April 1763; Modern edition by Johannes Pausch and Bärenreiter; Recorded – Schäfer 2001 (reissued 2003, 2004, 2007 & 2011)

== Hamburg and Danzig liturgical Passions ==
Note that this list may be incomplete

- The Order of Church Service forbade performance of Passion music on Oculi Sunday (3rd Sunday in Lent—reserved for the Installation Music (Juraten-Einführungsmusik) at the Michaeliskirche) and the dense succession of Passion performances had to be modified whenever the Feast of the Annunciation (25 March) fell on a Sunday during Lent or anytime during Holy Week. and
- The "Normal Order" for Passion music in Hamburg (as found in the Hamburg "Schreib-Kalendar") was as follows:

Event	Locale
Quadragesima (Invocavit) Sunday	St. Peter's Church, Hamburg
Reminiscere Sunday	St. Nikolai, Hamburg
Laetare Sunday	St. Catherine's Church, Hamburg
Judica Sunday	St. Jacobi, Hamburg
Thursday after Judica Sunday	Lesser St. Michael Church, Hamburg
Friday after Judica Sunday	Heilig-Geist Church, Hamburg
Saturday after Judica Sunday	St. Johannis Church, Hamburg
Palm Sunday	St. Michaelis Church, Hamburg
Holy Monday	St. Mary Magdalene Church, Hamburg
Holy Tuesday	St. Gertrude Chapel, Hamburg
Holy Wednesday	Pesthof Church, Hamburg
Maundy Thursday	St. Pauli Church, Hamburg
Good Friday	St. Georg Church, Hamburg

In 1745, due to the mourning period following the death of Charles VII, Holy Roman Emperor on 20 January 1745 (the mourning period lasting from 14 February–14 March), the performance schedule was altered in the following way:

Date	Event	Locale	Work
16 March	Tuesday after Reminiscere Sunday	Petriskirche Hamburg	Johannes-Passion TWV 5:30
25 March	Thursday after Oculi Sunday (Feast of the Annunciation)	Nikolaikirche Hamburg	TWV 5:30
28 March	Laetere Sunday	Katherinenkirche Hamburg	TWV 5:30
31 March	Wednesday after Laetere Sunday	Zuchthauskirche Hamburg	Paßions-Oratorium: Seliges Erwägen des Leidens und Sterbens Jesu Christi TWV 5:2a (extra performance)
4 April	Judica Sunday	Jakobiskirche Hamburg	TWV 5:30
7 April	Wednesday after Judica Sunday	Waisenhauskirche Hamburg	TWV 5:2a (extra performance)
8 April	Thursday after Judica Sunday	Klein Michaeliskirche Hamburg	TWV 5:30
9 April	Friday after Judica Sunday	Heilig-Geist-Kirche Hamburg	TWV 5:2a (substitute performance)
10 April	Saturday after Judica Sunday	Johanniskirche Hamburg	TWV 5:30
11 April	Palmarum	Michaeliskirche Hamburg	TWV 5:30
12 April	Heiligen Montag	Maria-Magdalenenkirche Hamburg	TWV 5:30
13 April	Heiligen Dienstag	Gertrudenkirche Hamburg	TWV 5:30
14 April	Heiligen Mittwoch	Pesthofkirche Hamburg	TWV 5:2a (substitute performance)
15 April	Gründonnerstag	Pauliskirche Hamburg	TWV 5:30
16 April	Karfreitag	Georgenkirche Hamburg	TWV 5:30

Year	TWV Number	Gospel	Title	Librettist	Scoring	Notes
1722	TWV 5:7	Matthew	Wenn meine Sünd' mich kränken (Paßions-Musik nach dem Evangelisten Matthäus)	Unknown librettist	MISSING	Performed 22 February (Petrikirche) and 1 (Nikolaikirche), 15 (Katherinenkirche), 22 (Jakobikirche), and 29 (Michaeliskirche) March 1722; Lost; First Passion setting performed as Cantor (church) of the Gelehrtenschule des Johanneums and Music Director in Hamburg
1723	TWV 5:8	Mark	Ein Lämmlein geht und trägt die Schuld (Paßions-Musik nach dem Evangelisten Markus)	Unknown librettist	SATB, Flute, 2 Oboes, 2 Oboes d'amore, Strings, and Continuo	Performed 14 (Petrikirche) and 21 (Nikolaikirche) February and 7 (Katherinenkirche), 14 (Jakobikirche), and 21 (Michaeliskirche) March 1723
1724	TWV 5:9	Luke	O Lamm Gottes, unschuldig (Paßions-Musik nach dem Evangelisten Lukas)	Unknown librettist	MISSING	Lost; Performed 27 (Petrikirche) February, 5 (Nikolaikirche), 19 (Katherinenkirche), and 26 (Jakobikirche) March, and 2 (Michaeliskirche) April 1724
1725	TWV 5:10	John	Jesu, deine tiefen Wunden (Paßions-Musik nach dem Evangelisten Johannes)	Unknown librettist	MISSING	Lost; Performed 18 (Petrikirche) and 25 (Nikolaikirche) February and 11 (Katherinenkirche), 18 (Jakobikirche), and ?(Michaeliskirche) March 1725
1726	TWV 5:11	Matthew	O hilf, Christe, Gottes Sohn (Paßions-Musik nach dem Evangelisten Matthäus)	Unknown librettist	MISSING	Lost; Performed 10 (Petrikirche), 17 (Nikolaikirche), and 31 (Katherinenkirche) March and 7 (Jakobikirche) and 14 (Michaeliskirche) April 1726
1727	TWV 5:12	Mark	Mein Heiland, du bist mir zulieb (Paßions-Musik nach dem Evangelisten Markus)	Unknown librettist	MISSING	Lost; Performed 2 (Petrikirche), 9 (Nikolaikirche), 23 (Katherinenkirche), and 30 (Jakobikirche) March and 6 (Michaeliskirche) April 1727
1728	TWV 5:13	Luke	Israel, ach geliebtes Vater-Herz! (Paßions-Musik nach dem Evangelisten Lukas)	Matthäus Arnold Wilkens	SATB, 2 Flutes, Recorder, 2 Oboes, Bassoon, Strings, and Continuo	Recorded – M.A. Willens (2013); Modern Edition (Bärenreiter [Telemann – Musical Works, Vol. 15 1964]); Performed 15 (Petrikirche) and 22 (Nikolaikirche) February and 7 (Katherinenkirche), 14 (Jakobikirche), and 21 (Michaeliskirche) March 1728
1729	TWV 5:14	John	Unsre Sünden-Schuld zu heben (Paßions-Musik nach dem Evangelisten Johannes)	Unknown librettist	MISSING	Lost; Performed 6 (Petrikirche), 13 (Nikolaikirche), and 27 (Katherinenkirche) March and 3 (Jakobikirche) and 10 (Michaeliskirche) April 1729
1730	TWV 5:15	Matthew	Wenn meine Sünd' mich kränken (Paßions-Musik nach dem Evangelisten Matthäus)	Unknown librettist	SATB, Flute, Oboe, Strings, Violetta, and Continuo	Recorded – Redel 1965, Freiberger 2010; Performed 26 (Petrikirche) February, 5 (Nikolaikirche), 19 (Katherinenkirche), and 26 (Jakobikirche) March and 2 (Michaeliskirche) April 1730
1731	TWV 5:16	Mark	Hochheiliges Versöhnungsfest (Paßions-Musik nach dem Evangelisten Markus)	Unknown librettist	MISSING	Lost; Performed 11 (Petrikirche) and 18 (Nikolaikirche) February and 4 (Katherinenkirche), 11 (Jakobikirche), and 18 (Michaeliskirche) March 1731
1732	TWV 5:17	Luke	Brüllest du? Gewaltger Donner! (Paßions-Musik nach dem Evangelisten Lukas)	Unknown librettist	MISSING	Lost; Performed 2 (Petrikirche), 9 (Nikolaikirche), 23 (Katherinenkirche), and 30 (Jakobikirche) March and 6 (Michaeliskirche) April 1732
1733	TWV 5:18	John	Du laßest uns durchs Blut (Paßions-Musik nach dem Evangelisten Johannes)	Unknown librettist	SATB, Flute, 2 Oboes, Strings, and Continuo	Recorded—Michael Scholl (2012); Performed 22 (Petrikirche) February and 1 (Nikolaikirche), 15 (Katherinenkirche), 22 (Jakobikirche), and 29 (Michaeliskirche) March 1733
1734	TWV 5:19	Matthew	Unknown (Paßions-Musik nach dem Evangelisten Matthäus)	Unknown librettist	MISSING	Lost; Performed 14 (Petrikirche) and 21 (Nikolaikirche) March and 4 (Katherinenkirche), 11 (Jakobikirche), and 18 (Michaeliskirche) April 1734
1735	TWV 5:20	Mark	Jesu, deine tiefen Wunden (Paßions-Musik nach dem Evangelisten Markus)	Unknown librettist	MISSING	Lost; Performed 27 (Petrikirche) February, 6 (Nikolaikirche), 20 (Katherinenkirche), and 27 (Jakobikirche) March and 3 (Michaeliskirche) April 1735
1736	TWV 5:21	Luke	Wenn meine Sünd' mich kränken (Paßions-Musik nach dem Evangelisten Lukas)	Unknown librettist	MISSING	Lost; Performed 19 (Petrikirche) and 26 (Nikolaikirche) February and 11 (Katherinenkirche), 18 (Jakobikirche), and ?(Michaeliskirche) March 1736
1737	TWV 5:22	John	Jesu, deine heil'gen Wunden (Paßions-Musik nach dem Evangelisten Johannes)	Unknown librettist	SATB, Flute, 2 Oboes, Strings, and Continuo	Modern edition (Edition Kunzelmann (PE.OCT10122)); Performed 10 (Petrikirche), 17 (Nikolaikirche), and 31 (Katherinenkirche) March and 7 (Jakobikirche) and 14 (Michaeliskirche) April 1737
1738	TWV 5:23	Matthew	O hilf, Christe, Gottes Sohn (Paßions-Musik nach dem Evangelisten Matthäus)	Unknown librettist	MISSING	Lost; Performed 23 (Petrikirche) February and 2 (Nikolaikirche), 16 (Katherinenkirche), 23 (Jakobikirche) and 30 (Michaeliskirche) March 1738
1739	TWV 5:24	Mark	O hilf, Christe, Gottes Sohn (Paßions-Musik nach dem Evangelisten Markus)	Unknown librettist	MISSING	Lost; Performed 15 (Petrikirche) and 22 (Nikolaikirche) February and 8 (Katherinenkirche), 15 (Jakobikirche) and 22 (Michaeliskirche) March 1739
1740	TWV 5:25	Luke	O hilf, Christe, Gottes Sohn (Paßions-Musik nach dem Evangelisten Lukas)	Unknown librettist	MISSING	Lost; Performed 6 (Petrikirche), 13 (Nikolaikirche), and 27 (Katherinenkirche) March and 3 (Jakobikirche) and 10 (Michaeliskirche) April 1740
1741	TWV 5:26	John	O hilf, Christe, Gottes Sohn (Paßions-Musik nach dem Evangelisten Johannes)	Unknown librettist	SATB, 2 Flutes, 2 Oboes, Strings, and Continuo	Performed 19 (Petrikirche) and 26 (Nikolaikirche) February and 12 (Katherinenkirche), 19 (Jakobikirche) and 26 (Michaeliskirche) March 1741
1742	TWV 5:27	Matthew	O hilf, Christe, Gottes Sohn (Paßions-Musik nach dem Evangelisten Matthäus)	Unknown librettist	MISSING	Lost; Performed 11 (Petrikirche) and 18 (Nikolaikirche) February and 4 (Katherinenkirche), 11 (Jakobikirche) and 18 (Michaeliskirche) March 1742
1743	TWV 5:28	Mark	Unknown (Paßions-Musik nach dem Evangelisten Markus)	Unknown librettist	MISSING	Lost; Performed 3 (Petrikirche), 10 (Nikolaikirche), 24 (Katherinenkirche), and 31 (Jakobikirche) March and 7 (Michaeliskirche) April 1743
1744	TWV 5:29	Luke	Wenn meine Sünd mich kränken (Paßions-Musik nach dem Evangelisten Lukas)	Unknown librettist	SATB, Flute, Oboe d'amore, Strings, and Continuo	Recorded – S. Heinrich 1973 (reissued 1999, 2001, 2007, & 2009); Performed 16 (Petrikirche) and 23 (Nikolaikirche) February and 8 (Katherinenkirche), 15 (Jakobikirche), and 22 (Michaeliskirche) March 1744
1745	TWV 5:30	John	Ein Lämmlein geht und trägt die Schuld (Paßions-Musik nach dem Evangelisten Johannes)	Joachim Johann Daniel Zimmermann	SATB, Flute, 2 Oboes, Bass Oboe, Strings, and Continuo	Recorded – P. Peire 1996 (reissued 1999 & 2009); Modern Edition—Bärenreiter (Telemann – Musical Works, Vol. 29 1996); Performed 16 (Petrikirche), 25 (Nikolaikirche), and 28 (Katherinenkirche) March and 4 (Jakobikirche) and 11 (Michaeliskirche) April 1745 Western Hemisphere Premiere: E. Miller & C. Grills with the Harvard Early Music Society 2017
1746	TWV 5:31	Matthew	Lasst uns mit Ernst betrachten (Paßions-Musik nach dem Evangelisten Matthäus)	Unknown librettist	SATB, Flute, Oboe, Oboe d'amore, 2 horns, Strings, and Continuo	Recorded – Redel 1965 (reissued 1992 & 1996), Seeliger 1994 (reissued 1995 & 2009), Stötzel 1997 (reissued 2003 & 2007), H. Max 1999 (reissued 2006 & 2009); Performed 27 (Petrikirche) February, 6 (Nikolaikirche), 20 (Katherinenkirche), and 27 (Jakobikirche) March and 3 (Michaeliskirche) April 1746
1747	TWV 5:32	Mark	Jesu deine tiefen Wunden (Paßions-Musik nach dem Evangelisten Markus)	Unknown librettist	MISSING	Lost; Performed 19 (Petrikirche) and 26 (Nikolaikirche) February and 12 (Katherinenkirche), 19 (Jakobikirche), and 26 (Michaeliskirche) March 1747
1748	TWV 5:33	Luke	Wisset ihr, dass ihr (Paßions-Musik nach dem Evangelisten Lukas)	Unknown librettist	SATB, Flute, Oboe, Oboe d'amore, Strings, and Continuo	Recorded – H. Max 2010 (reissued 2011); Performed 3 (Petrikirche), 10 (Nikolaikirche), 24 (Katherinenkirche), and 31 (Jakobikirche) March and 7 (Michaeliskirche) April 1748
1749	TWV 5:34	John	Jesu, meines Lebens Leben (Paßions-Musik nach dem Evangelisten Johannes)	Unknown librettist	SATB, instruments unknown	Recorded – M. Scholl 2011; Performed 23 (Petrikirche) February and 2 (Nikolaikirche), 16 (Katherinenkirche), 23 (Jakobikirche), and 30 (Michaeliskirche) March 1749
1750	TWV 5:35	Matthew	Wenn meine Sünd mich kränken (Paßions-Musik nach dem Evangelisten Matthäus)	Unknown librettist	SATB, 2 Flutes, 2 Oboes, Strings, and Continuo	Recorded – Rademann 2002 (reissued 2007); Performed 15 (Petrikirche) and 22 (Nikolaikirche) February and 8 (Katherinenkirche), 15 (Jakobikirche), and 22 (Michaeliskirche) March 1750
1751	TWV 5:36	Mark	Unknown (Paßions-Musik nach dem Evangelisten Markus)	Unknown librettist	MISSING	Lost; Performed 28 (Petrikirche) February, 7 (Nikolaikirche), 21 (Katherinenkirche), and 28 (Jakobikirche) March and 4 (Michaeliskirche) April 1751
1752	TWV 5:37	Luke	Unknown (Paßions-Musik nach dem Evangelisten Lukas)	Unknown librettist	MISSING	Lost; Performed 20 (Petrikirche) and 27 (Nikolaikirche) February and 12 (Katherinenkirche), and 19 (Jakobikirche), and 26 (Michaeliskirche) March 1752
1753	TWV 5:38	John	Liebe Seele, nun dich schwinge (Paßions-Musik nach dem Evangelisten Johannes)	Unknown librettist	MISSING	Lost; Performed 13 (Petrikirche) and 20 (Nikolaikirche) March and 3 (Katherinenkirche), 10 (Jakobikirche), and 17 (Michaeliskirche) April 1753
1754	TWV 5:39	Matthew	? (Paßions-Musik nach dem Evangelisten Matthäus)	Unknown librettist	?	Autograph aus der Abteilung Schulmusikerziehung der Hochschule für Musik "Franz Liszt" Weimar; reprint by Kultur- und Forschungsstätte Michaelstein 1986; Performed 26 (Petrikirche) February, 5 (Nikolaikirche), 19 (Katherinenkirche), and 26 (Jakobikirche) March, and 2(Michaeliskirche) April 1754
1754	TWV 5:53	Matthew	Auf, auf o Mensch ("Danziger Passion", Paßions-Musik nach dem Evangelisten Matthäus)	Unknown librettist	Unknown	Recorded – Nemeth 1993 (reissued 1995, 2003 & 2011); Discovered 1980; Performed 7 April 1754 (Danzig)
1755	TWV 5:40	Mark	Das ist ein kostlich Ding (Paßions-Musik nach dem Evangelisten Markus)	Unknown librettist	SATB, 2 Flutes, Oboe, Strings, and Continuo	Recorded – M. Scholl 2006; Performed 18 (Petrikirche) and 25 (Nikolaikirche) February and 11 (Katherinenkirche), and 18 (Jakobikirche), and ? (Michaeliskirche) March 1755
1756	TWV 5:41	Luke	Unknown (Paßions-Musik nach dem Evangelisten Lukas)	Unknown librettist	MISSING	Lost; Performed 9 (Petrikirche), 16 (Nikolaikirche), and 30 (Katherinenkirche) March and 6 (Jakobikirche) and 13(Michaeliskirche) April 1756
1757	TWV 5:42	John	Kommt zur Freystatt, ihr Betrübten (Paßions-Musik nach dem Evangelisten Johannes)	Unknown librettist	SATB, Flute, Oboe, Strings, and Continuo	Modern Edition by Johannes Pausch; Performed 1 (Petrikirche), 8 (Nikolaikirche), 22 (Katherinenkirche), and 29 (Jakobikirche) March and 5 (Michaeliskirche) April 1757
1758	TWV 5:43	Matthew	Herr, starke mich, dein Leiden zu bedenken (Paßions-Musik nach dem Evangelisten Matthäus)	Unknown librettist	SATB, 2 Flutes, 2 Oboes, 2 Horns, Trumpet, 2 Trombones, Timpani, Strings, and Continuo	Modern Edition by Johannes Pausch, Recorded – M. Scholl 2000; Performed 14 (Petrikirche) and 21 (Nikolaikirche) February and 7 (Katherinenkirche), 14 (Jakobikirche), and 21 (Michaeliskirche) March 1758
1759	TWV 5:44	Mark	Gott sei gelobet und gebenedeiet (Paßions-Musik nach dem Evangelisten Markus)	Unknown librettist	SATB, 2 Flutes, 2 Recorders, 2 Oboes, Bass Oboe, 2 Clarinets, 2 Bassoons, 2 Horns, 2 Trombones, Strings, and Continuo	Modern Edition by Johannes Pausch, Recorded – Redel 1963 (reissued 1999); Performed 6 (Petrikirche) and 13 (Nikolaikirche), and 27(Katherinenkirche) March and 3 (Jakobikirche) and 10 (Michaeliskirche) April 1759
1760	TWV 5:45	Luke	Welche Feind des Kreuzes (Paßions-Musik nach dem Evangelisten Lukas)	Unknown librettist	SATB, 2 Oboes (doubling 2 flutes), Strings, and Continuo	Modern Edition by Johannes Pausch; Performed 26 (Petrikirche) February, 4 (Nikolaikirche), 18 (Katherinenkirche), and ? (Jakobikirche) March and 1 (Michaeliskirche) April 1760. Much of the recitatives & turbae choruses are reused in C. P. E. Bach's 1771 & 1779 Passions.
1761	TWV 5:46	John	Der Herr erhöre dich in deiner Not (Paßions-Musik nach dem Evangelisten Johannes)	Unknown librettist	SATB, Recorder, 2 Flutes, Oboe, Hautbois basse, Strings, and Continuo	Modern Edition by Johannes Pausch; Performed 10 (Petrikirche) and 17 (Nikolaikirche) February and 3 (Katherinenkirche), and 10 (Jakobikirche), and 17 (Michaeliskirche) March 1761
1762	TWV 5:47	Matthew	Unknown (Paßions-Musik nach dem Evangelisten Matthäus)	M. Pitiscus	Unknown	Modern Edition by Johannes Pausch; Performed 2 (Petrikirche), 9 (Nikolaikirche), 23 (Katherinenkirche), and 30 (Jakobikirche) March and 6 (Michaeliskirche) April 1762
1763	TWV 5:48	Mark	Unknown (Paßions-Musik nach dem Evangelisten Markus)	Unknown librettist	MISSING	Lost; Performed 22 (Petrikirche) February and 1 (Nikolaikirche), 15 (Katherinenkirche), 22 (Jakobikirche), and 29 (Michaeliskirche) March 1763
1764	TWV 5:49	Luke	Hier lass uns ruhn, o Teurer! (Paßions-Musik nach dem Evangelisten Lukas)	Unknown librettist	SATB, Flute, 2 Oboes, Strings, and Continuo	Modern Edition by Johannes Pausch, Recorded – Pausch ?; Performed 13 (Petrikirche) and 20 (Nikolaikirche) March and 3 (Katherinenkirche), 10 (Jakobikirche), and 17 (Michaeliskirche) April 1764
1765	TWV 5:50	John	Ach Gott und Herr (Paßions-Musik nach dem Evangelisten Johannes)	Unknown librettist	SATB, 2 Oboes, hautbois basse, 2 Bassoons, Strings, and Continuo	Modern Edition by Johannes Pausch, Recorded – Pausch 1999 (reissued 2004); Performed 26 (Petrikirche) February, 5 (Nikolaikirche), 19 (Katherinenkirche), and 26 (Jakobikirche) March and 2 (Michaeliskirche) April 1765
1766	TWV 5:51	Matthew	Ein Lämmlein geht und trägt die Schuld (Paßions-Musik nach dem Evangelisten Matthäus)	Unknown librettist	SATB, 2 Flutes, 2 Oboes, Bass Oboe, Clarinet, Bassoon, 2 Horns, Strings, and Continuo	Modern Edition by Johannes Pausch, Recorded – Pausch 2001; Performed 16 (Petrikirche) and 23 (Nikolaikirche) February and 9 (Katherinenkirche), 16 (Jakobikirche), and 23 (Michaeliskirche) March 1766
1767	TWV 5:52	Mark	Christe du Lamm Gottes (Paßions-Musik nach dem Evangelisten Markus)	Johann Rist	SATB, 2 Flutes, 2 Oboes, 2 Bassoons, 2 Horns, 2 Trumpets, Strings, and Continuo	Modern Edition by Johannes Pausch, Recorded – Smekens 1996; Performed 6 (Petrikirche), 13 (Nikolaikirche), and 27 (Katherinenkirche) March and 3 (Jakobikirche) and 12 (Michaeliskirche) April 1767
1768	TWV 5:21	Luke	Wenn meine Sünd' mich kränken (Paßions-Musik nach dem Evangelisten Lukas)	Unknown librettist	MISSING	Repeat of 1736 St Luke Passion (as Carl Philipp Emanuel Bach had not arrived yet in Hamburg) under direction of Telemann's grandson Georg Michael Telemann; Lost; Performed 23 (Petrikirche) February and 1 (Nikolaikirche), 15 (Katherinenkirche), 22 (Jakobikirche), and 29 (Michaeliskirche) March 1768

=== Modern editions ===
- Lukas-Passion 1728 "Israel, ach, geliebtes Vater-Herz!" (TWV 5:13). Georg Philipp Telemanns Musikalische Werke, Band 15, Hans Hörner and Martin Ruhnke, ed. Kassel, u. a.: Bärenreiter-Verlag, 1964.

Johannes Pausch's Edition Musiklandschaften has edited many of Telemann's late Passions (1991–2001):

- Johannes-Passion 1757 (TWV 5:42). Editio princeps.
- Matthäus-Passion 1758 (TWV 5:43). Wissenschaftliche Edition.
- Marcus-Passion 1759 (TWV 5:44). Wissenschaftliche Edition.
- Lukas-Passion 1760 (TWV 5:45). Editio princeps.
- Johannes-Passion 1761 (TWV 5:46). Editio princeps.
- Matthäus-Passion 1762 (TWV 5:47). Editio princeps.
- Lukas-Passion 1764 (TWV 5:49). Editio princeps.
- Johannes-Passion 1765 (TWV 5:50). Editio princeps.
- Matthäus-Passion 1766 (TWV 5:51). Editio princeps.
- Marcus-Passion 1767 (TWV 5:52). Editio princeps.
- Seliges Erwägen, Berliner Fassung 1763 (TWV 5:2). Wissenschaftliche Ausgabe
- Johannes-Passion 1745 "Ein Lämmlein geht und trägt die Schuld" (TWV 5:30). Georg Philipp Telemanns Musikalische Werke, volume 29, Wolfgang Hirschmann, ed. Kassel, u. a.: Bärenreiter-Verlag, 1996.
- Passions-Oratorium: Seliges Erwägen des Leidens und Sterbens Jesu Christi 1763 "Schmücke dich, o liebe Seele" (TWV 5:2). Georg Philipp Telemanns Musikalische Werke, Band 33, Ute Pötzsch, ed. Kassel, u. a.: Bärenreiter-Verlag, 2001.
- Betrachtung der 9. Stunde am Todestage Jesu 1755 "Erhole dich, o Sonne" (TWV 5:5)/ Der Tod Jesu 1755 "Du, dessen Augen flossen" (TWV 5:6). Georg Philipp Telemanns Musikalische Werke, Band 31, Wolf Hobohn, ed. Kassel, u. a.: Bärenreiter-Verlag, 2006.
- Lukas-Passion 1744 "Wenn meine Sünd' mich kranken" (TWV 5:29). Felix Schröder, ed. Stuttgart: Carus-Verlag, 2007(?).
- Johannes-Passion 1737 "Jesu, deine heligen Wunden" (TWV 5:22). Felix Schröder, ed. Frankfurt/Main, u. A.: Edition Peters, 2007(?).
- Der für die Sünde der Welt leidende und sterbende Jesus aus den IV. Evangelisten (Brockes-Passion) 1716 "Mich vom Stricke meiner Sünden" (TWV 5:1). Georg Philipp Telemanns Musikalische Werke, Band 34, Carsten Lange, ed. Kassel, u. a.: Bärenreiter-Verlag, 2008.

== Selected recordings ==
- Telemann: St. John Passion TWV 5:50 (Catherine Bott, Sarah Connolly, Reginaldo Pinheiro, Jan van der Crabben, Philip Defrancq; Collegium Instrumentale Brugense, Capella Brugensis; conductor: Patrick Peire). Eufoda EUF1224.
- Telemann: St. Matthew Passion TWV 5:31 (Barbara Schlick, Claudia Schubert, Wilfried Jochens, Stefan Dörr, Achim Rück, Hans-Georg Wimmer; Collegium Vocale des Bach-Chores Siegen; Barock-Orchester "La Stravaganza-Köln"; conductor: Ulrich Stötzel). Brilliant Classics 992277 (first issued by Hänssler).
- Telemann: Passions Oratorium – Das selige Erwägen des bittern Leiden und Sterbens Jesu Christi TWV 5:2 (Barbara Locher, Zeger Vandersteene, Stefan Dörr, Berthold Possemeyer, Rene Schmidt; Freiburger Vokalensemble; L'arpa festante München; conductor: Wolfgang Schäfer). Brilliant Classics 99521 (licensed from Bayer Records)--Version unknown.

== See also ==
- Passion music
- Passions (C. P. E. Bach), including several parodies from Telemann
- Passions (Bach) (Johann Sebastian Bach)
