= Herrscher des Himmels, erhöre das Lallen, BWV 248 III =

Third cantata of Johann Sebastian Bach's Christmas Oratorio

Herrscher des Himmels, erhöre das Lallen
- Part III of Christmas Oratorio
- Christmas cantata by J. S. Bach
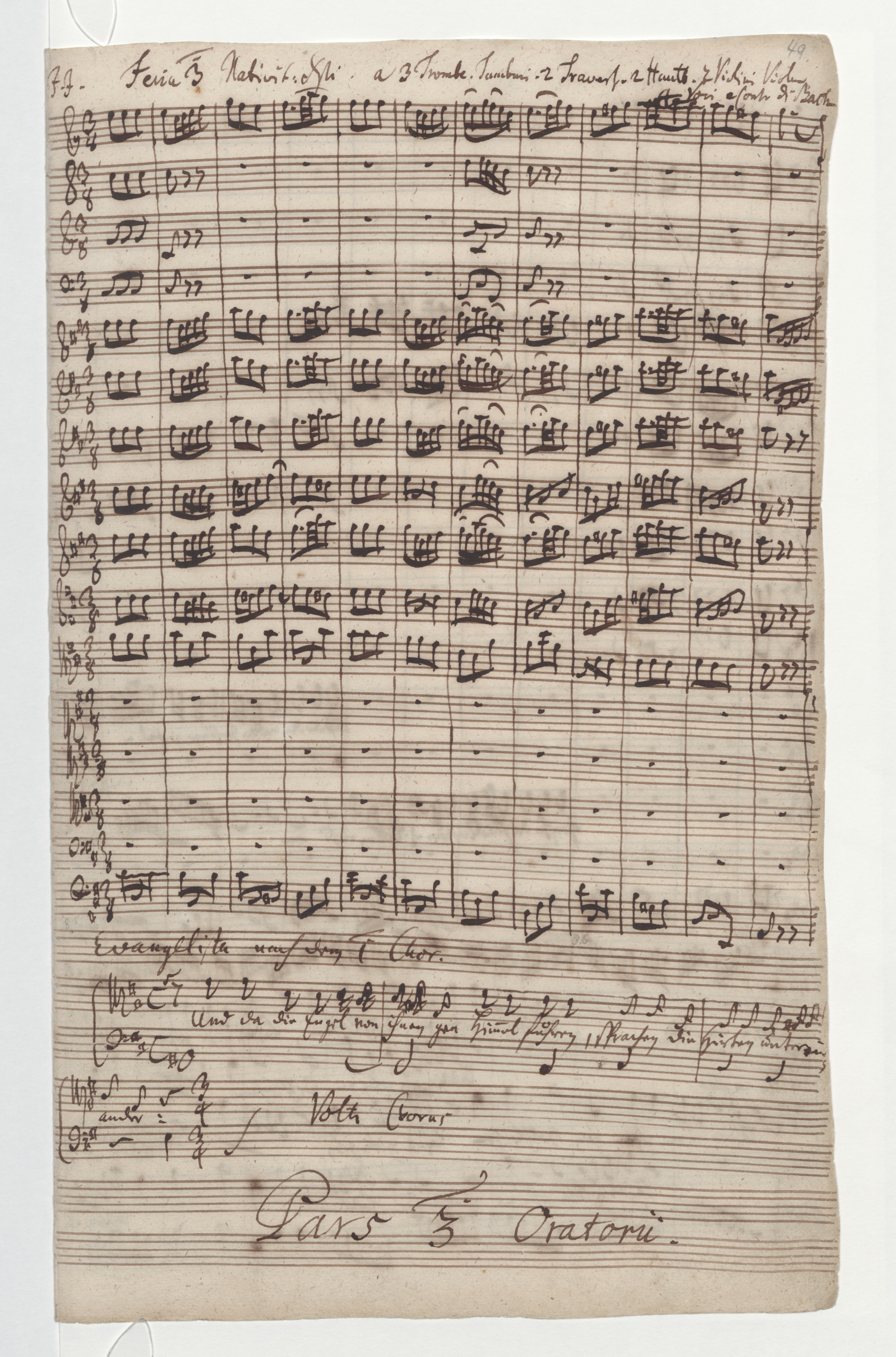
- First page of autograph with start of Chorus and opening recitative of Evangelist
- Catalogue: BWV 248 III
- Related: based on: BWV 214; BWV 213
- Occasion: Third day of Christmas
- Bible text: Luke 2:15-20
- Chorale: Gelobet seist du, Jesu Christ; Fröhlich soll mein Herze springen; Laßt Furcht und Pein
- Performed: 27 December 1734: Leipzig
- Movements: 13
- Vocal: SATB choir and soloists; soprano, tenor, alto and bass soloists
- Instrumental: 3 trumpets; timpani; 2 traversos; 2 oboes; 2 oboes d'amore; 2 violins; viola; cello; violone; continuo

Herrscher des Himmels, erhöre das Lallen (Ruler of heaven, hear our babble), BWV 248^{III} (also written as BWV 248 III), is a 1734 church cantata for the third day of Christmas (27 December) which Johann Sebastian Bach composed as the third part of his Christmas Oratorio. The Christmas cantata was first performed in 1734, in Leipzig. Bach was then Thomaskantor, responsible for music at four churches in Leipzig, a position he had assumed in 1723.

The cantata follows the Nativity of Jesus as narrated in the Gospel of Luke. It covers the adoration of the shepherds. An unknown librettist added text for reflective recitatives and arias and included stanzas from Lutheran hymns. Bach structured the cantata in 13 movements and scored it for four vocal parts and a Baroque orchestra with trumpets and timpani, flutes, oboes, and strings. Part III of the oratorio begins with a festive chorus, which is, in contrast to the other parts, repeated after the closing chorale, as a conclusion of the three days of Christmas. A tenor soloist narrates the Biblical story in recitative as the Evangelist. An alto aria is perhaps the only newly composed aria in the entire oratorio, while music for other movements is based on two cantatas that Bach had composed for the court at Dresden.

Bach led the first performances at the Nikolaikirche, one of the main churches of Leipzig, on 27 December 1734, during a morning service.

== Background ==
In 18th-century Leipzig, the three Christian high holidays Christmas, Easter and Pentecost were each celebrated on three consecutive days, with different prescribed readings and related music each day. Christmas was celebrated from 25 to 27 December. For the principal churches, Thomaskirche and Nikolaikirche, the director musices (Thomaskantor) determined which music was to be performed during the services on Sundays and feast days.

The prescribed readings for the third day of Christmas were from the Epistle to the Hebrews, Christ is higher than the angels, (Hebrews 1:1–14), and from the prologue of the Gospel of John, also called the Hymn to the Word (John 1:1–14). Bach had been presenting church cantatas for the Christmas season in the Thomaskirche and Nikolaikirche since his appointment as director musices in Leipzig in 1723, including cantatas for the third day of Christmas:

- In 1723, as part of his first cantata cycle: Sehet, welch eine Liebe hat uns der Vater erzeiget, BWV 64
- In 1724, as part of his second cantata cycle: Ich freue mich in dir, BWV 133
- In 1725, as part of his third cantata cycle: Süßer Trost, mein Jesus kömmt, BWV 151

In 1733, Augustus III of Poland succeeded his father, Augustus the Strong, as Elector of Saxony and took residence in Dresden. Bach hoped to become court composer for the Catholic Elector, and dedicated the Latin Missa in B minor, BWV 232 I, to him. Several of Bach's secular cantatas celebrating the Saxonian prince-electoral family were performed in Leipzig, including two cantatas first performed in 1733:

- Laßt uns sorgen, laßt uns wachen, BWV 213 , also known as Hercules am Scheidewege (Hercules at the Crossroads), on a libretto by Picander, was performed on 5 September 1733, the 11th birthday of the son of the elector;
- Tönet, ihr Pauken! Erschallet, Trompeten! BWV 214 (Resound, ye drums! Ring out, ye trumpets!), a cantata for the elector's wife, Maria Josepha, to honour her 34th birthday on 8 December. The cantata is also known as "Glückwunschkantate zum Geburtstage der Königin" (Congratulation cantata for the Queen's birthday), although Maria Josepha was not crowned Queen of Poland until January 1734.

Bach drew on these two cantatas for choral movements, arias and duets of the oratorio's parts I to IV. The Bach scholar Christoph Wolff noted that Bach reused music with similar affect, "rescuing it for more durable purpose". Bach composed for part III the recitatives of the Evangelist, the chorus of the shepherds, the reflecting bass recitative, the chorales, and the alto aria "Schließe, mein Herze", as the only aria in the oratorio.

=== Christmas season 1734–35 ===
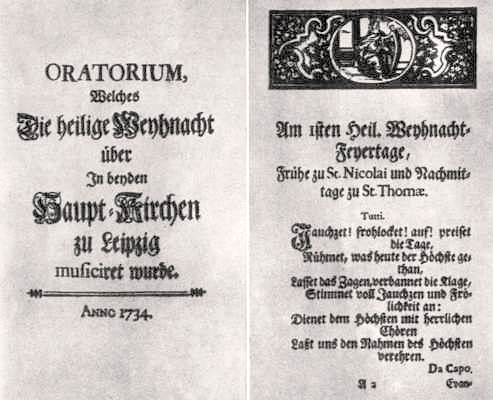
First two pages of the libretto of Bach's Christmas Oratorio, as printed in 1734

Bach composed his Christmas Oratorio for the Christmas season from Christmas Day on 25 December 1734 to Epiphany on 6 January 1735. Herrscher des Himmels, erhöre das Lallen, BWV 248 III, for the Third Day of Christmas in 1734, is the third of six cantatas (or parts) constituting this oratorio. Its first cantata, Part I of the oratorio, Jauchzet, frohlocket! Auf, preiset die Tage, BWV 248 I, had been performed on the first feast day, and was focused on the birth of Jesus. The second cantata, Part II of the oratorio, Und es waren Hirten in derselben Gegend, was performed the following day, focused on the annunciation to the shepherds.

=== Text ===
Departing from the usual readings for 27 December, the text of Part III deals with the adoration of the shepherds, from their itinerary to Bethlehem to their adoration in the stable, taken from the prescribed readings for the Second Day of Christmas. The story is told following the Gospel of Luke, interspersed with reflecting recitatives, arias and chorales.

The identity of the librettist of the Christmas Oratorio cantatas is unknown, with Picander, who had collaborated with Bach earlier, a likely candidate. The oratorio's libretto was published in 1734. The quotations from the Bible are rendered in Martin Luther's translation. The librettist included three stanzas from Lutheran hymns: "Dies hat er alles uns getan" from Luther's "Gelobet seist du, Jesu Christ", "Ich will dich mit Fleiß bewahren" from Paul Gerhardt's "Fröhlich soll mein Herze springen", and for the conclusion "Seid froh, dieweil" from Christoph Runge's "Laßt Furcht und Pein". The Bach scholar Klaus Hofmann noted that the traditional melodies of the chorales, which are still in use, connect the music to the present time.

Bach led the first performance at the Nikolaikirche during the morning service.

== Music and content ==
The work is structured in 13 movements. Unlike the other cantatas in the Christmas Oratorio, the opening chorus of the cantata is repeated as the closing movement. The alto aria is perhaps the only newly composed aria in the entire oratorio. The cantata features four vocal soloists (soprano, alto, tenor, and bass), a four-part choir (SATB) and a Baroque instrumental ensemble of three trumpets (Tr), timpani, two traversos (Tra) two oboes (Ob) also doubling as oboes d'amore (Oa), two violins (Vl), viola (Va) and basso continuo. The scoring is equal to Part I of the oratorio.

The scoring in the following table follows the Neue Bach-Ausgabe (New Bach Edition). The keys and time signatures are from Alfred Dürr, and use the symbol for common time. No key is shown for the recitatives, because they modulate.

Movements of Herrscher des Himmels, erhöre das Lallen
No.	Title	Text	Type	Vocal	Brass	Winds	Strings	Key	Time
24	Herrscher des Himmels, erhöre das Lallen	anon.	Chorus	SATB	3Tr	2Tra 2Ob	2Vl Va	D major	3/8
25	Und da die Engel von ihnen gen Himmel fuhren	Luke 2:15	Recitative	T					common time
26	Lasset uns nun gehen gen Bethlehem	Luke 2:15	Chorus	SATB		2Tra 2Oa	2Vl Va	A major	3/4
27	Er hat sein Volk getröst'	anon.	Recitative	B		2Tra			common time
28	Dies hat er alles uns getan	Luther	Chorale	SATB		2Tra 2Ob	2Vl Va	A major	common time
29	Herr, dein Mitleid, dein Erbarmen	anon.	Duet	S B		2Oa		A major	3/8
30	Und sie kamen eilend	Luke 2:16-19	Recitative	T					common time
31	Schließe, mein Herze, dies selige Wunder	anon.	Aria	A			Vl (solo)	B minor	2/4
32	Ja, ja, mein Herz soll es bewahren	anon.	Recitative	A		2Tra			common time
33	Ich will dich mit Fleiß bewahren	Gerhardt	Chorale	SATB		2Tra 2Ob	2Vl Va	G major	common time
34	Und die Hirten kehrten wieder um	Luke 2:20	Recitative	T					common time
35	Seid froh dieweil	Runge	Chorale	SATB		2Tra 2Ob	2Vl Va	F# minor	common time
24	Herrscher des Himmels, erhöre das Lallen (da capo)	anon.	Chorus	SATB	3Tr	2Tra 2Ob	2Vl Va	D major	3/8

=== Movements ===
==== 24 ====
24 Herrscher des Himmels
Recordings from a 2012 performance by St Matthew's Concert Choir and Orchestra, directed by Phiroz Dalal.

The cantata begins with a chorus, Herrscher des Himmels, erhöre das Lallen (Ruler of Heaven, hear the murmur), in D major and a triple meter like the opening of the first cantata of the oratorio. It is based on the closing chorus of BWV 214, Blühet, ihr Linden in Sachsen, wie Zedern (Bloom, you Saxon lindens, like cedars!). In the original, three solo voices enter one after the other, tenor, soprano, alto, which is copied in the oratorio for the choral parts.

This chorus is repeated at the end of the cantata, for a conclusion of the three days of Christmas.

==== 25 ====
The Evangelist tells that, after the angels left, Und da die Engel von ihnen gen Himmel fuhren (And when the angels went away from them towards heaven), the shepherds spoke to each other.

==== 26 ====
26 Lasset uns nun gehen

The following Biblical sentence is set as a turba chorus, Lasset uns nun gehen gen Bethlehem (Let us go now towards Bethlehem), in complex polyphony. The hurried walk of the shepherds is depicted in a walking bass, and an almost continuous fast movement in flute and first violin.

==== 27 ====
A bass recitative, Er hat sein Volk getröst't (He has comforted His people) reflects that shepherds played a role in many stories between God and his people.

==== 28 ====
28 Dies hat er alles

The scene is closed by a chorale stanza, Dies hat er alles uns getan (All this He has done for us), the seventh stanza from Luther's "Gelobet seist du, Jesu Christ", published in Wittenberg in 1524.

==== 29 ====
29 Herr, dein Mitleid

A duet of soprano and bass, beginning "Herr, dein Mitleid, dein Erbarmen tröstet uns und macht uns frei" (Lord, your compassion, your mercy comforts us and makes us free) expands the aspect of God's mercy. It is based on the duet "Ich bin deine" / "Du bist meine" (I am yours / You are mine), a duet of Hercules and Virtue from BWV 213. The voices are accompanied by two obbligato oboes d'amore, while the original music featured two violins. The wind instruments are more suitable to represent the shepherds.

==== 30 ====
The Evangelist continues the narration with the shepherds finding the baby, "Und sie kamen eilend und funden beide, Mariam und Joseph, dazu das Kind in der Krippe liegen" (And they came hastily and found both Mary and Joseph, along with the child lying in the manger). The Gospel of Luke points at Mary's reaction to what the shepherds said: "Maria aber behielt alle diese Worte und bewegte sie in ihrem Herzen" (Mary however kept all these words and pondered them in her heart).

==== 31 ====
31 Schliesse mein Herze

In an alto aria, Mary seems to tell herself "Schließe, mein Herze, dies selige Wunder fest in deinem Glauben ein!" (Enclose, my heart, these blessed miracles fast within your faith!), which is an invitation to the listener to do the same. The intimate setting, with an obbligato solo violin, is the only aria which Bach newly composed for the oratorio.

==== 32 ====
32 Ja, ja, mein Herz

The alto continues the determination to remember in an accompanied recitative: "Ja, ja! mein Herz soll es bewahren" (Yes, yes, my heart shall cherish this)". Two flutes are the obbligato instruments.

==== 33 ====
33 Ich will dich mit

A chorale supports the intention: "Ich will dich mit Fleiß bewahren" (I will cherish You assiduously). Using the 15th stanza of Paul Gerhardt's 1653 hymn "Fröhlich soll mein Herze springen", devotion is promised into eternity, which is described as "... ohne Zeit dort im andern Leben" (... without time, there in the other life). The melody that Bach used was written by Georg Ebeling in 1666 for "Warum sollt ich mich denn grämen" (Zahn 6461).

==== 34 ====
The Evangelist reports that the shepherds returned, praising God: "Und die Hirten kehrten wieder um" (And the shepherds went back again).

==== 35 ====
35 Seid froh, dieweil

A chorale concludes the story, requesting to rejoice: "Seid froh, dieweil" (Meanwhile, be happy). It is the fourth stanza from Christoph Runge's 1653 song "Laßt Furcht und Pein", with a melody composed by Kaspar Füger in 1593 for "Wir Christenleut'" (Zahn 2072). The chorale is in F-sharp minor, and unusually also ends in this key, which makes for a better transition to the repetition of the opening chorus in D major.

== See also ==
- Christmas Oratorio discography

== Cited sources ==
Bach digital

- "Lasst uns sorgen, lasst uns wachen (Dramma per musica) BWV 213; BC G 18". Bach Digital. 2021.
- "Tönet, ihr Pauken! Erschallet, Trompeten! BWV 214: Secular cantata (Birthday)". Bach Digital. 2021.
- "Und es waren Hirten in derselben Gegend / (Christmas oratorio, part 2) BWV 248.2 II; BWV 248 II; BC D 7 II". Bach Digital. 2021.
- "Herrscher des Himmels, erhöre das Lallen / (Christmas oratorio, part 3) BWV 248.2 III; BWV 248 III; BC D 7 III". Bach Digital. 2021.
- "Sehet, welch eine Liebe hat uns der Vater erzeiget BWV 64; BC A 15". Bach Digital. 2022.
- "Ich freue mich in dir BWV 133; BC A 16". Bach Digital. 2022.
- "Süßer Trost, mein Jesus kömmt BWV 151; BC A 17". Bach Digital. 2022.
- "Leipzig, Bach-Archiv Leipzig / D-LEb Rara I, 7a [Textdruck]". Bach Digital. 2022.

Books

- Dürr, Alfred; Jones, Richard D. P. (2006). The Cantatas of J. S. Bach: With Their Librettos in German-English Parallel Text. Oxford University Press. ISBN 978-0-19-929776-4.
- Hofmann, Klaus, ed. (2005). Johann Sebastian Bach: Weihnachtsoratorium / Christmas Oratorio / Oratorium Tempore Nativitatis Christi / BWV 248 (PDF) (Urtext, Vocal score). Stuttgarter Bach-Ausgaben (in German, English, and French). Translated by Coombs, John. Continuo realisation by Horn, Paul, English version by Drinker, Henry S. Carus. CV 31.248/53.
- Rathey, Markus (2016). Johann Sebastian Bach's Christmas Oratorio: Music, Theology, Culture. Oxford University Press. ISBN 978-0-19-027526-6.
- Stauffer, George B. (2016). "Leipzig: A Cosmopolitan Trade Center". In Buelow, George J. (ed.). The Late Baroque Era: Vol 4. From the 1680s to 1740. Springer. ISBN 978-1-34-911303-3.
- Wessel, Jens (2015). "Köthen (1717–1723)" (PDF). J. S. Bach und die italienische Oper / Drammi per musica für das kurfürstlich-sächsische und polnische Königshaus zwischen 1733 und 1736 (dissertation) (in German). Hochschule für Musik und Theater Hamburg.
- Wolff, Christoph (2000). Johann Sebastian Bach: The Learned Musician. W. W. Norton & Company. ISBN 978-0-393-32256-9.

Online source

- Dahn, Luke (2021). "BWV 248.28". bach-chorales.com.
- Dahn, Luke (2018). "BWV 248.33". bach-chorales.com.
- Dahn, Luke (2018). "BWV 248.35". bach-chorales.com.
- Dellal, Pamela (2021). "BWV 248-III – "Herrscher des Himmels, erhöre das Lallen"". pameladellal.com.
- Dellal, Pamela (2021). "BWV 213 – "Laßt uns sorgen, lasst uns wachen" – Herkules auf dem Scheidewege [Hercules at the Crossroads]". pameladellal.com.
- Dellal, Pamela (2021). "BWV 214 – "Tönet, ihr Pauken! Erschallet, Trompeten!"". pameladellal.com.
- Hennerfeind, Markus (2021). "Johann Sebastian Bach / Weihnachtsoratorium BWV 248, Kantate Nr. 3 ("Herrscher des Himmels, erhöre das Lallen")". Tonkünstlerverein.
- "J. S. Bach, Weihnachtsoratorium / Werkeinführung und Libretto". schoenewolf.com. 2021.
