= Die güldne Sonne voll Freud und Wonne =

Lutheran hymn by Paul Gerhardt

- Christian morning hymn
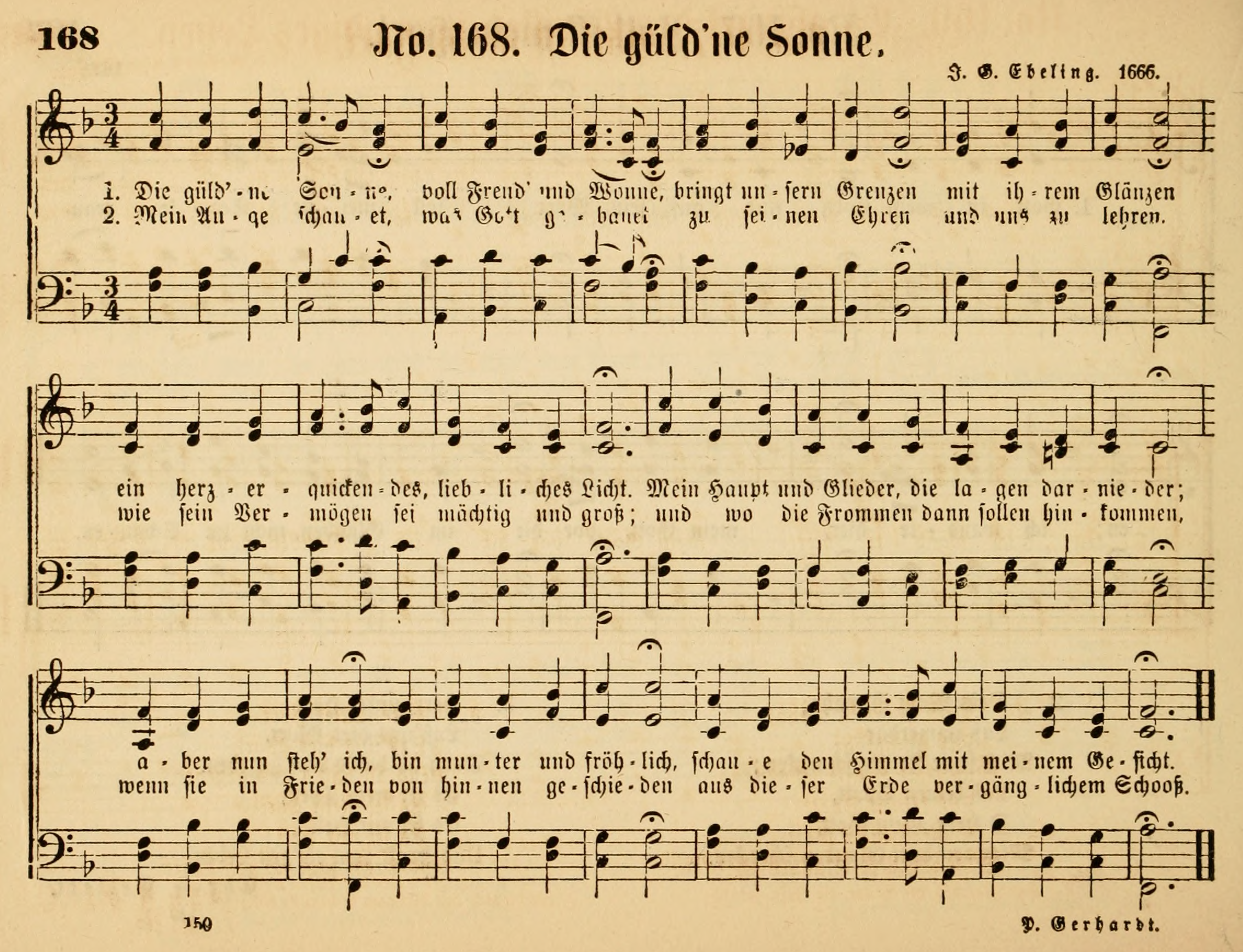
- In an 1878 American hymnal
- English: The golden sun full of joy and delight
- Text: by Paul Gerhardt
- Language: German
- Meter: 5.5. 5.5. 10. 5.6. 5.6. 10.
- Melody: by: Johann Georg Ebeling; J. A. Freylinghausen; Jakob Hintze; Johannes Schmidlin
- Published: 1666

"Die güldne Sonne voll Freud und Wonne" (The golden sun full of joy and delight) is a Lutheran hymn by Paul Gerhardt. It is a morning hymn which was first published in 1666, with a four-part setting by Johann Georg Ebeling. Gerhardt created an unusual hymn metre (5.5. 5.5. 10. 5.6. 5.6. 10.) for its 12 stanzas.

Among the hymn tunes for "Die güldne Sonne" is also one by Johann Anastasius Freylinghausen, which was published in 1708. This tune was included in Schemellis Gesangbuch of 1736, with an accompaniment attributed to Johann Sebastian Bach. Ebeling's melody remained the standard for the hymn, and with this tune it is included in the modern Protestant hymnal Evangelisches Gesangbuch, and other hymnals and songbooks.

Catherine Winkworth translated seven stanzas of the hymn into English ("The golden sunbeams with their joyous gleams", 1855), and Richard Massie six ("Evening and Morning", 1857). Full translations include those by John Kelly ("The golden morning", 1867) and Hermann Brueckner's "The sun ascending", 1918. Four stanzas of the hymn are included in Evangelical Lutheran Worship as well as Lutheran Service Book, both of them published in 2006.

== Background and history ==
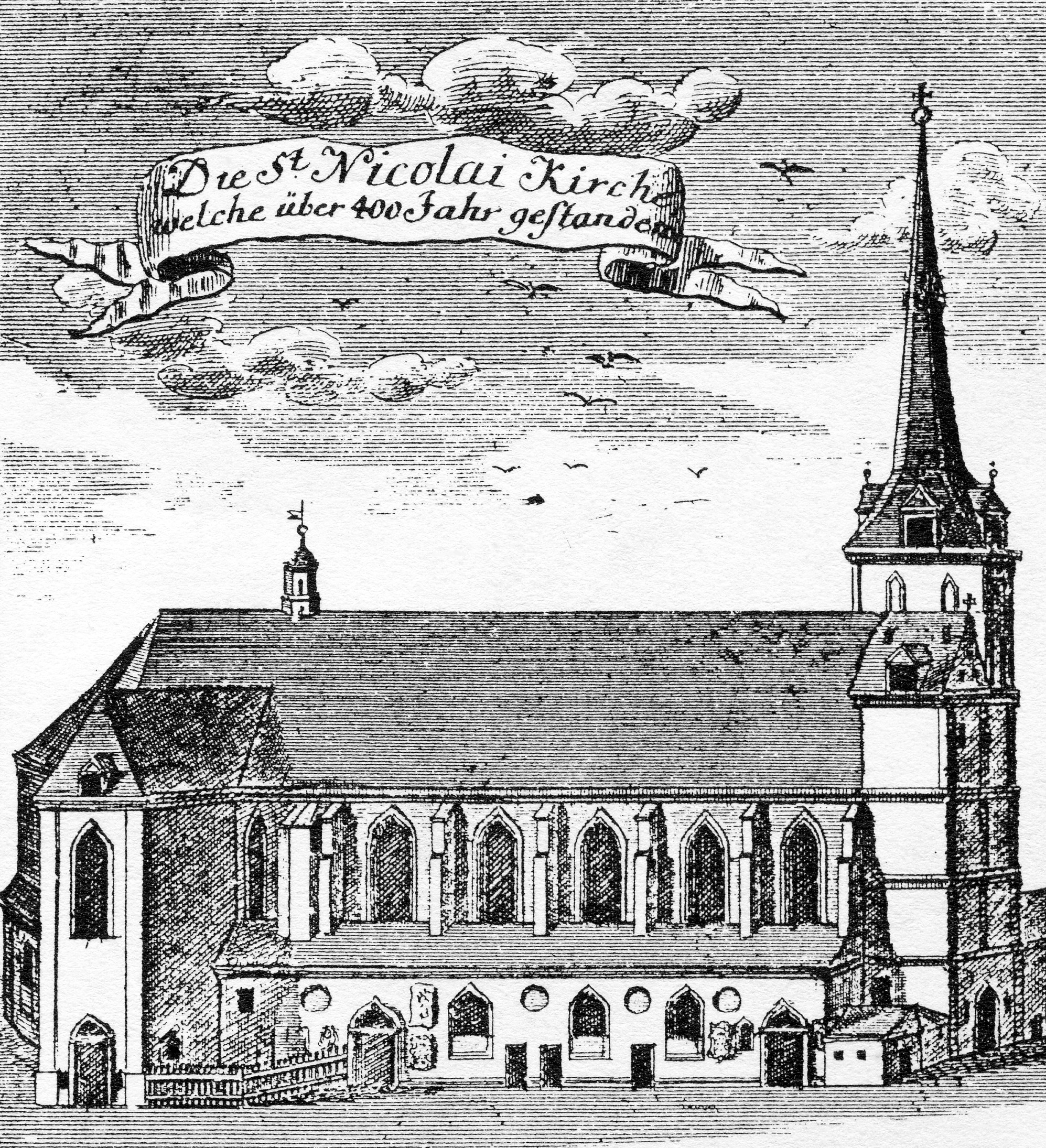
Nikolaikirche in Berlin, where Gerhardt was pastor, depicted in 1736

Paul Gerhardt, the author of the text of "Die güldne Sonne", was a pastor of the Nikolaikirche in the centre of Berlin from 1657. The church musician there, Johann Crüger, had held the office from 1622. In 1649, a year after the end of the Thirty Years' War, Crüger began publishing hymns by Gerhardt in his Praxis pietatis melica. By its 1661 edition, the hymnal contained 90 songs by Gerhardt.

Gerhardt was influenced by the writing and poetry of Johann Arndt, whose Sechs Bücher vom wahren Christentum (lit. 'six books on true Christianity'; True Christianity) and Paradiesgärtlein aller christlichen Tugenden (lit. 'little paradise garden of all Christian virtues'; Little Garden of Paradise) were published in the early 17th century, before the outbreak of the Thirty Years' War. Both Arndt and Gerhardt adhered to Orthodox Lutheranism, but considered religion primarily as a personal experience. Their writings are devotional, and can be regarded as step-stones towards Pietism. Gerhardt's "Die güldne Sonne" follows Arndt's thoughts, inviting the reader to contemplate the beauty and blessings of God's creation. It is thought to have been written in the poet's mature years.

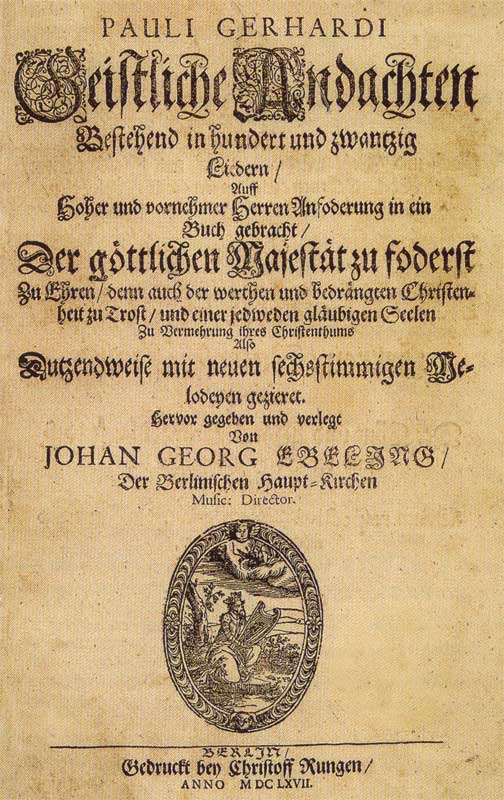
Title page of Ebeling's collection, 1667

By then, the church musician at the Nikolaikirche was Johann Georg Ebeling who had succeeded Crüger when he died in 1662. In February 1666 Gerhardt had to step down as pastor of the Nikolaikirche. The same year, Ebeling started to publish hymns by Gerhardt hymns in a series called Pauli Gerhardi Geistliche Andachten (lit. 'Pauli Gerhardi spiritual devotions'). The first three volumes were printed by Erasmus Rösner in Frankfurt an der Oder. "Die güldne Sonne" was first published in the third volume of Pauli Gerhardi Geistliche Andachten, with a four-part setting by Ebeling. It appeared under the header "Morgen-Segen" (Morning–blessing):

Further volumes of Ebeling's Pauli Gerhardi Geistliche Andachten were first published by Christoph Runge in Berlin. After the completion of the series in 1667, new editions of the entire collection in Berlin and other German cities soon followed. The collection comprises 120 hymns by Gerhardt, all with a musical setting provided by Ebeling, who had composed 112 original hymn tunes for them, including "Die güldne Sonne".

Gerhardt's hymn has kept its presence in German hymnals and songbooks: in the 21st century it is available in dozens of these, which include collections of songs for children and young people, and collections for funerals.

== Text ==
Gerhardt's hymn is in twelve stanzas of ten lines. In a comparatively small number of his poems, Gerhardt used an unusual verse structure, in rhyme scheme and hymn metre. Half a dozen complicated stanza formats appear in Gerhardt's poetry, half of which, including the one he used for "Die güldne Sonne", are his own invention. This hymn's stanza format is:

| Line | 1–2 | 3–4 | 5 | 6–7 | 8–9 | 10 |
|---|---|---|---|---|---|---|
| rhyme scheme | AA | BB | C | DD | EE | C |
| hymn meter | 5.5. | 5.5. | 10. | 5.6. | 5.6. | 10. |

According to Theodore Brown Hewitt's 1918 book about the influence of Gerhardt, this stanza format is neither harmonious nor artistic, but nonetheless very compatible with typical 17th-century melodies. A style characteristic of the poetry is the Baroque usage of twin formulas, or doublets of exact or approximate synonyms, such as "Freud und Wonne" (lit. 'happiness and bliss'), sometimes with alliteration, e.g. "Wort und Wille" (lit. 'word and will') or assonance, e.g. "Meeresbrausen und Windessausen".

=== Translations ===
The 1907 Dictionary of Hymnology considered two versions of Gerhardt's hymn as being in common use:

- "The golden sunbeams with their joyous gleams", Catherine Winkworth's translation of stanzas 1–4, 8, 9 and 12, first published in 1855.
- "Evening and Morning", Richard Massie's translation of stanzas 4 and 8–12, first published in 1857.

Translations not in common use are, according to that dictionary:

- "The sun's golden beams" by Catherine Hannah Dunn (1857)
- "Sunbeams all golden" by Frances Elizabeth Cox (1864)
- "What is our mortal race" (beginning with stanza 7) by Edward Massie (1866)
- "See the sun's glorious light", also by E. Massie (1867)
- "The golden morning" by John Kelly (1867).

Herman Brueckner (1866–1942) translated the complete hymn, "The sun ascending", first published in 1918. The Lutheran Service Book, published in 2006, has four stanzas of the hymn, combining two in R. Massie's translation and two in Brueckner's translation. The Free Lutheran Chorale-Book website presents a composite hymn titled "The Golden Morning". It has the complete content in a version that can be sung to the hymn tune, which is based partly on the translations of Kelly, R. Massie and Cox.

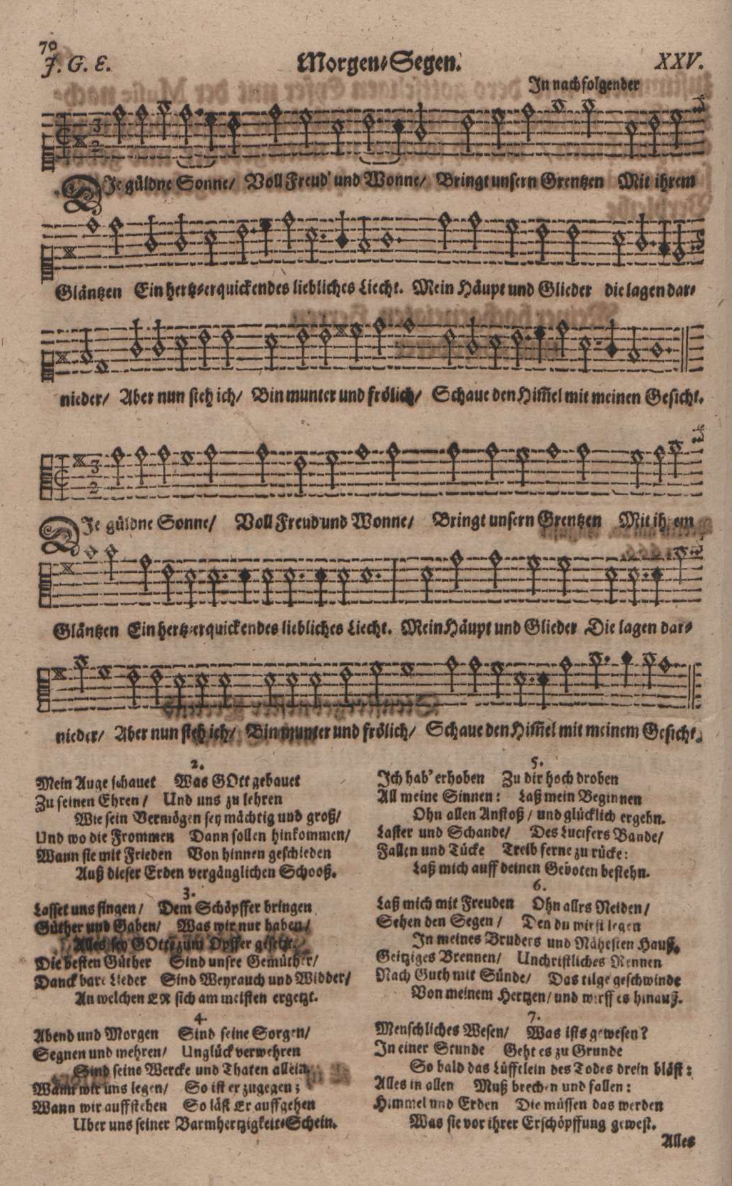
First edition, p. 70, soprano and alto, stanzas 1 and 8 to 12

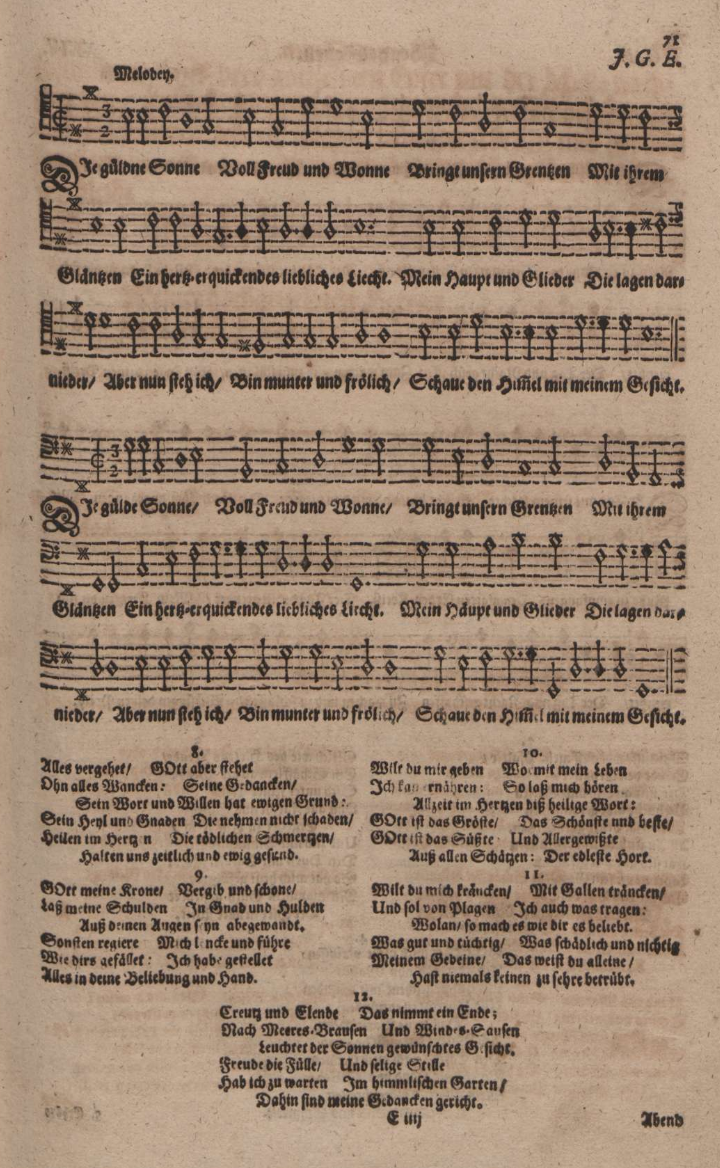
First edition, p. 71, tenor and bass parts, stanzas 1 to 7

==== Winkworth ====
Winkworth's "The golden sunbeams with their joyous gleams", a translation of stanzas 1–4, 8, 9 and 12 of Gerhardt's hymn, was published in her Lyra Germanica of 1855. This translation follows the rhyme scheme of the original, but partially diverts from its metre. Kennedy's hymnal of 1863 retained stanzas 1, 3, 4 and 12 of Winkworth's translation. Winkworth's translation of the first stanza:

1. Die güldne Sonne
voll Freud und Wonne
bringt unsern Grenzen
mit ihrem Glänzen
ein herzerquickendes, liebliches Licht.
Mein Haupt und Glieder,
die lagen darnieder;
aber nun steh ich,
bin munter und fröhlich,
schaue den Himmel mit meinem Gesicht.

Translation:

The golden sunbeams
with their joyous gleams,
Are kindling o'er earth,
her life and mirth,
Shedding forth lovely and heart-cheering light;
Through the dark hours' chill
I lay silent and still,
But risen at length
to gladness and strength,
I gaze on the heavens all glowing and bright.

==== R. Massie ====
R. Massie's "Evening and Morning", which follows the original metre throughout, is a singable English-language version. It translates stanzas 4 and 8—12 of Gerhardt's hymn, and was published in Mercer's Church Psalm & Hymn Book in 1857. It was adopted, in whole or in part, in several subsequent hymnals. One of these hymnals, James Martineau's Hymns of Praise and Prayer of 1876, has R. Massie's translation of stanzas 4, 9 and 12. R. Massie's translation of the fourth stanza:

4. Abend und Morgen
sind seine Sorgen;
segnen und mehren,
Unglück verwehren
sind seine Werke und Taten allein.
Wenn wir uns legen,
so ist er zugegen;
wenn wir aufstehen,
so lässt er aufgehen
über uns seiner Barmherzigkeit Schein.

Translation:

Evening and morning,
Sunset and dawning,
Wealth, peace and gladness,
Comfort in sadness,—
These are Thy works; all the glory be Thine!
Times without number,
Awake or in slumber,
Thine eye observes us,
From danger preserves us,
Causing Thy mercy upon us to shine.

==== Kelly ====
Kelly published his translations of the 120 hymns in Pauli Gerhardi Geistliche Andachten in 1867. For each translation the metre of the original is followed. According to the Dictionary of Hymnology, Kelly renders Gerhardt's hymns faithfully. Kelly's translation of stanza 8:

8. Alles vergehet,
Gott aber stehet
ohn alles Wanken;
seine Gedanken,
sein Wort und Wille hat ewigen Grund.
Sein Heil und Gnaden,
die nehmen nicht Schaden,
heilen im Herzen
die tödlichen Schmerzen,
halten uns zeitlich und ewig gesund.

Translation:

All—all decayeth,
But God still stayeth,
His thoughts they waver
A moment never,
His word and will both eternally 'dure.
His grace and favour
Uninjur'd are ever,
Deadly wounds healing,
The heart with peace filling,
Health here and yonder to us they ensure.

==== Brueckner ====
The 1930 American Lutheran Hymnal retained stanzas 1, 3, 5 and 12 of Brueckner's 1918 translation. The final stanza of Gerhardt's hymn, with Brueckner's translation:

12. Kreuz und Elende,
das nimmt ein Ende;
nach Meeresbrausen
und Windessausen
leuchtet der Sonnen gewünschtes Gesicht.
Freude die Fülle
und selige Stille
wird mich erwarten
im himmlischen Garten;
dahin sind meine Gedanken gericht'.

Translation:

Ills that still grieve me
Soon are to leave me;
Though waves may tower
And winds gain power,
After the storm the fair sun shows its face.
Joys e'er increasing,
And peace never ceasing,
These I shall treasure
And share in full measure
When in his mansions God grants me a place.

== Hymn tunes and settings ==
The hymn metre of "Die güldne Sonne" lends itself most easily to a setting in a ternary rhythm. A 21st-century interpretation is that the triple metre of Ebeling's setting has the character of a galliard, a dance with a "light-footed" rhythm, which musically elevates the earth-heavy (erdenschwer) statements of Gerhardt's text.

=== Ebeling ===
Ebeling published his four-part setting of "Die güldne Sonne" in G major. His melody for the hymn is catalogued as Zahn No. 8013. According to the Dictionary of Hymnology, where Ebeling's hymn tune is called a "beautiful melody", this tune is known under the name "Franconia" in Ireland. A hymn tune named "Philippi", for hymn texts in 6.6.4.6.6.6.4. metre, is derived from Ebeling's setting of "Die güldne Sonne". The German Protestant hymnal, Evangelisches Gesangbuch, includes "Die güldne Sonne" with Ebeling's melody as EG 449. In the 21st century, Gerhard Raßner provided a modern edition of Ebeling's four-part setting.

According to author Christa Kirschbaum, speaking in a 2016 WDR 3 broadcast on the hymn, Ebeling's melody follows the text of the first stanza, beginning high, like the sun, turning downward when "lying down" (lagen darnieder) is mentioned, and rising again starting from "But now I stand" (Aber nun steh ich). Kirschbaum thinks that Gerhardt and Ebeling, more than just depicting the rising of the sun, thus rather refer to the resurrection (Auferstehung) of Christ.

With Ebeling's tune, the hymn was recorded by Dieter Falk, by the Bachchor Siegen (conducted by Ulrich Stötzel), and by the Wilhelmshavener Vokalensemble (conducted by Ralf Popken). Ebeling's setting was also recorded by Klaus Mertens, accompanied by the pianist Götz Payer (2011), and by the Stuttgarter Hymnus-Chorknaben, conducted by Gerhard Wilhelm (1986). Instrumental settings of the hymn tune, mostly for organ, were composed by Hermann Paul Claußnitzer, Herbert Collum, Paul Manz, Lothar Graap, and others.

=== Hintze ===
Jacob Hintze published "Die güldne Sonne voll Freud und Wonne" with a different tune, Zahn No. 8014, in 1670. With this tune, the hymn was included in the Praxis pietatis melica, which was continued by Runge after Crüger's death, from its 1671 edition. Other hymnals mostly adopted the hymn with Ebeling's tune.

=== Freylinghausen / Bach ===
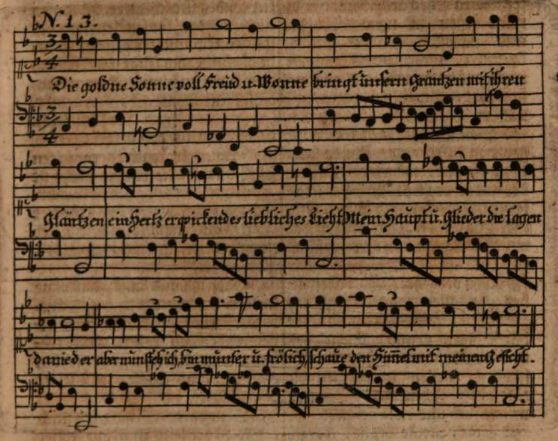
BWV 451, No. 13 in Schemellis Gesangbuch

Johann Anastasius Freylinghausen published another setting of the hymn in 1708. The melody is aria-like: Carl von Winterfeld, a 19th-century hymnologist, considers it to be among Freylinghausen's least dance-like hymn settings. Freylinghausen's hymn tune, Zahn No. 8015, was adopted in Schemellis Gesangbuch (1736), with the bassline attributed to J. S. Bach (BWV 451).

The Bach Gesellschaft published BWV 451 in 1893, and in the New Bach Edition it was published in 1991. The setting was recorded often, along with other songs from the collection, such as Peter Schreier and organist Karl Richter in 1978, Berthold Possemeyer and organist Matthias Janz in 1994, and a choral version in a live performance by the Thomanerchor conducted by Georg Christoph Biller in 2009.

=== Other settings ===
Two new melodies for the hymn were published in the 18th century (Zahn Nos. 8016 and 8017), and another in the first half of the 19th century (Zahn No. 8018a). The Zahn 8017 melody, composed by Johannes Schmidlin, appears in the Paul-Gerhardt-Chorbuch, published in 2006. J. Martineau's 1876 publication with R. Massie's translation of the hymn contains a new four-part setting for it (not in Zahn), by the publisher's brother Basil.
