= Schmidlin =

Schmidlin is a surname. Notable people with the surname include:

- Frank K. Schmidlin (1861–1939), Australian X-ray pioneer
- Fritz Schmidlin, Swiss footballer
- Johannes Schmidlin (1722–1772), Swiss composer
- Paolo Schmidlin (born 1964), Italian sculptor
- Rick Schmidlin (born 1954), American film preservationist and silent film scholar
- Walter Schmidlin, Swiss footballer

== See also ==
- Mero-Schmidlin, British construction company
