= Warum sollt ich mich denn grämen =

1653 Lutheran hymn

- Hymn by Johann Georg Ebeling
- English: Why should I then grieve
- Text: Paul Gerhardt
- Language: German
- Composed: 1666
- Published: 1653

"Warum sollt ich mich denn grämen" (Why should I then grieve) is a Lutheran hymn with a text by Paul Gerhardt written in 1653. It was first published that same year in the fifth edition of Johann Crüger's hymnal Praxis Pietatis Melica, set to a melody composed by Crüger. In the 1993 Protestant hymnal, Evangelisches Gesangbuch, it appears as number 370 with a melody composed by Johann Georg Ebeling, which was published with the divergent title "Warum sollt ich mich doch grämen" in Pauli Gerhardi Geistliche Andachten in 1666.

== Text ==
The text of Paul Gerhardt's hymn "Warum sollt ich mich denn grämen" was first published in 1653, in the fifth edition of Johann Crüger's hymnal Praxis Pietatis Melica. Below is the text of the first stanza, in the original German:

Warum sollt' ich mich denn grämen?
Hab' ich doch Christum noch,
wer will mir den nehmen?
Wer will mir den Himmel rauben,
den mir schon Gottes Sohn
beigelegt im Glauben?

== Musical settings ==
Johann Crüger's hymn tune for "Warum sollt ich mich denn grämen", published in the 1653 fifth edition of his Praxis Pietatis Melica, has 6455a as Zahn number. Several variants of Crüger's melody for the hymn were published in the 18th and 19th centuries. In 1666 Johann Georg Ebeling published the hymn with a new melody, Zahn 6456a, under the variant title "Warum sollt ich mich doch grämen", in Pauli Gerhardi Geistliche Andachten. Also this hymn tune was published in several variants in the 18th and 19th centuries. Other tunes for the hymn, sometimes partly based on Ebeling's setting, were published from the 17th to the 19th century (Zahn 6457–6462).

Zahn 6462 is the variant Johann Sebastian Bach used in Part III of his Christmas Oratorio, with the 15th stanza of Gerhardt's hymn "Fröhlich soll mein Herze springen" ("Ich will dich mit Fleiß bewahren") as text. This version of the melody, a simplification of the Zahn 6461 melody, was first published in 1769 as No. 143 in the second volume of Bach's four-part chorales published by Birnstiel, and is thus attributed to Bach. "Warum sollt ich mich denn grämen", BWV 422, is another four-part chorale harmonisation by Bach of the same tune.

Max Reger composed a chorale prelude as No. 43 of his 52 Chorale Preludes, Op. 67 in 1902.

== Sources ==
- Zahn, Johannes (1891). Die Melodien von den achtzeiligen trochäischen bis zu den zehnzeiligen inkl. enthaltend [Melodies in eight trochaic up to and including ten lines]. Die Melodien der deutschen evangelischen Kirchenlieder (in German). Vol. IV. Gütersloh: Bertelsmann.
