= Fröhlich soll mein Herze springen =

- Christmas carol
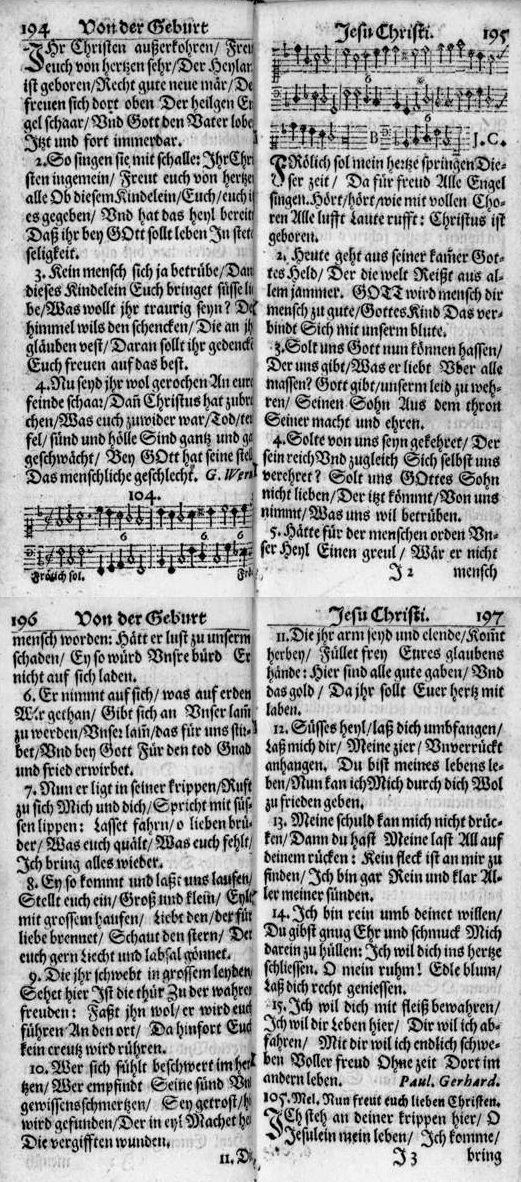
- The hymn in the first edition, "Frölich sol mein hertze springen"
- English: All my heart this night rejoices
- Text: Paul Gerhardt
- Language: German
- Meter: 8 3 3 6 8 3 3 6
- Melody: by Johann Crüger; by Johann Georg Ebeling
- Published: 1653

"Fröhlich soll mein Herze springen" ("Merrily my heart shall leap") is a Christian Christmas hymn by Paul Gerhardt, originally in 15 stanzas in artful metre. It was first published, "Frölich sol mein hertze springen", in 1653 in the fifth edition of the hymnal Praxis Pietatis Melica by Johann Crüger, who also created a melody. Johann Sebastian Bach used it as a chorale in his Christmas Oratorio, with a different melody by Johann Georg Ebeling. The song is part, with twelve stanzas, of the current Protestant hymnal Evangelisches Gesangbuch and other songbooks.

Catherine Winkworth translated seven stanzas in 1858 as "All my heart this night rejoices". Other translations also exist.

== History ==
Paul Gerhardt wrote the lyrics in the first person, describing a personal reaction to the Christmas story. The hymn appeared first in the fifth edition of the hymnal Praxis Pietatis Melica by Johann Crüger in 1653. It appears in a section titled "Von der Geburt Jesu Christ" (Of the birth of Jesus Christ).

The hymn was missing in the 1854 Deutsches Evangelisches Kirchen-Gesangbuch. From the Deutsches Evangelisches Gesangbuch where it appeared in eleven stanzas, it has remained in the repertory of Protestant church singing. In the current Protestant hymnal Evangelisches Gesangbuch, the song is EG 36. The song is part of several other hymnals and songbooks. It was regarded as ecumenical by the Arbeitsgemeinschaft für ökumenisches Liedgut but was not included in the Catholic hymnal Gotteslob of 2013.

=== Translations ===
Catherine Winkworth translated seven of its twelve stanzas to English as "All my heart this night rejoices", published in the second volume of her Lyra Germanica in 1858. In a 1907 Dictionary of Hymnology. it has been regarded as a "beautiful but rather free translation". Other translations include "Let the voice of glad thanksgiving", of selected stanzas by A. T. Russell, published in the Dalston Hospital Hymn Book in 1848. "All my heart with joy is springing" is a translation of several stanzas by Dr. Kennedy, published in his Hymnologia Christiana in 1863. "Lightly bound my bosom, ringing" is a translation of the complete hymn by Dr. M. Loy, published in the Ohio Lutheran Hymnal in 1880.

== Text and theme ==
Gerhardt originally wrote 15 stanzas of eight lines each, in an unusual and artful metre. It follows the pattern of a sermon at the time. The text begins saying "I" in a believer's personal statement, for the singer to identify with what is said. It then appeals to a "you", meaning the congregation requested to join in doing so. The song ends in a prayer.

The following table shows Gerhardt's text in the 12 stanzas contained in the Evangelisches Gesangbuch and the translation by Winkworth:

German current lyrics

1. Fröhlich soll mein Herze springen
dieser Zeit,
da vor Freud'
alle Engel singen.
Hört, hört, wie mit vollen Choren
alle Luft
laute ruft:
Christus ist geboren!

2. Heute geht aus seiner Kammer
Gottes Held,
der die Welt
reißt aus allem Jammer.
Gott wird Mensch, dir Mensch, zugute,
Gottes Kind
das verbind't
sich mit unserm Blute.

3. Sollt' uns Gott nun können hassen,
der uns gibt,
was er liebt
über alle Maßen?
Gott gibt unserm Leid zu wehren,
seinen Sohn
aus dem Thron
seiner Macht und Ehren.

4. Er nimmt auf sich, was auf Erden
wir getan,
gibt sich dran,
unser Lamm zu werden,
unser Lamm, das für uns stirbet
und bei Gott
für den Tod
Gnad und Fried erwirbet.

5. Nun er liegt in seiner Krippen,
ruft zu sich
mich und dich,
spricht mit süßen Lippen:
"Lasset fahrn, o liebe Brüder,
was euch quält,
was euch fehlt;
ich bring alles wieder."

6. Ei, so kommt, und laßt uns laufen,
stellt euch ein,
groß und klein,
eilt mit großen Haufen!
Liebt den, der vor Liebe brennet;
schaut den Stern,
der euch gern
Licht und Labsal gönnet.

7. Die ihr schwebt in großem Leide,
sehet, hier
ist die Tür
zu der wahren Freude;
fasst ihn wohl, er wird euch führen
an den Ort,
da hinfort
euch kein Kreuz wird rühren.

8. Wer sich fühlt beschwert im Herzen,
wer empfind’t
seine Sünd
und Gewissensschmerzen,
sei getrost: hier wird gefunden,
der in Eil
machet heil
die vergift'ten Wunden.

9. Die ihr arm seid und elende,
kommt herbei,
füllet frei
eures Glaubens Hände.
Hier sind alle guten Gaben
und das Gold,
da ihr sollt
euer Herz mit laben.

10. Süßes Heil, laß dich umfangen
laß mich dir,
meine Zier,
unverrückt anhangen!
Du bist meines Lebens Leben;
nun kann ich
mich durch dich
wohl zufrieden geben.

11. Ich bin rein um deinetwillen:
Du gibst g’nug
Ehr und Schmuck,
mich darein zu hüllen.
Ich will dich ins Herze schließen,
o mein Ruhm!
Edle Blum,
lass dich recht genießen

12. Ich will dich mit Fleiß bewahren,
ich will dir
leben hier,
dir will ich abfahren;
mit dir will ich endlich schweben,
voller Freud'
ohne Zeit
dort im andern Leben.

Winkworth translation

All my heart this night rejoices
as I hear
far and near
sweetest angel voices.
"Christ is born," their choirs are singing
till the air
ev'rywhere
now with joy is ringing.

Forth today the Conqu'ror goeth,
who the foe,
sin and woe,
death and hell, o'erthroweth.
God is man, man to deliver;
His dear Son
now is one
with our blood forever.

Shall we still dread God's displeasure,
who, to save,
freely gave
His most cherished Treasure?
To redeem us, He hath given
His own Son
from the throne
of His might in heaven.

He becomes the Lamb that taketh
sin away
and for aye
full atonement maketh.
For our life His own He tenders;
and our race,
by His grace,
fit for glory renders.

Hark! a voice from yonder manger,
soft and sweet,
doth entreat,
"Flee from woe and danger;
brethren, from all ills that grieve you
you are freed;
all you need
I will surely give you."

Come, then, banish all your sadness,
one and all,
great and small;
come with songs of gladness.
Love Him who with love is glowing;
hail the star,
near and far
light and joy bestowing.

Dearest Lord, Thee will I cherish.
Though my breath
fail in death,
yet I shall not perish,
but with Thee abide forever
there on high,
in that joy
which can vanish never.

== Melodies and settings ==
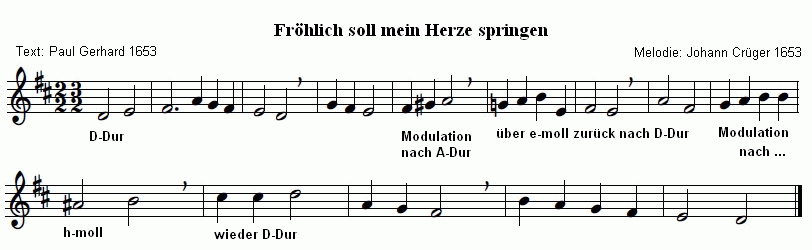
Crüger's melody, with description of the modulations

Johann Crüger first published the hymn in 1653 in the fifth edition of his hymnal Praxis Pietatis Melica, with a melody he composed himself. The melody has "leaping" features and modulates often. The last line, in the first stanza saying that Christ is born, moves downward, corresponding to a move from Heaven to Earth. Crüger also wrote a four-part setting. Burkhart M. Schürmann composed a chorale partita of all 15 stanzas, in both German and English (All my heart), for three-part choir in 2010.

The hymn was also sung with a melody which Johann Georg Ebeling created for Gerhardt's "Warum sollt ich mich denn grämen" (EG 370). It appeared in 1666 in Pauli Gerhardi Geistliche Andachten. This melody was used by Bach in a four-part setting in his Christmas Oratorio, in Part III, "Ich will dich mit Fleiß bewahren", reflecting the preceding aria, "Schließe, mein Herze, dies selige Wunder". Bach used the melody also in 1736 in Schemellis Gesangbuch.

== Literature ==
- Paul Gerhardt: Dichtungen und Schriften. Munich 1957, pp. 1–3.
- Johann Friedrich Bachmann: Paulus Gerhardts geistliche Lieder: historisch-kritische Ausgabe. Oehmigke, Berlin 1866, pp. 95–97 (Digitalisat, p. 95, at Google Books).

== See also ==
- List of Christmas carols
