= Spruch =

Spruch can mean "saying". It can also refer to:

- Spruchdichtung, a genre of Middle High German sung verse excluding love songs
- Spruch (music) or dictum, vocal music with lyrics taken from sacred scripture.
- Zbigniew Spruch, Polish cyclist
