= Lobe den Herrn, meine Seele, BWV 143 =

Church cantata by Johann Sebastian Bach

Lobe den Herrn, meine Seele
- BWV 143
- Church cantata by J. S. Bach
- Occasion: New Year's Day
- Bible text: Psalms 146:1,5,10
- Chorale: "Du Friedefürst, Herr Jesu Christ" by Jakob Ebert
- Movements: 7
- Vocal: SATB choir; soprano, tenor and bass
- Instrumental: 3 corni da caccia; timpani; bassoon; 2 violins; viola; continuo

Lobe den Herrn, meine Seele (Praise the Lord, my soul), BWV 143, (Note: "BWV" is Bach-Werke-Verzeichnis, a thematic catalogue of Bach's works.) is an early cantata by Johann Sebastian Bach. He appears to have composed the cantata for New Year's Day, probably when he was in his 20s, but whether it was first performed in Mühlhausen or Weimar is not known: the date of composition is unclear. Bach's authorship has been doubted because the cantata has several unusual features; one of these is the scoring, it is the only Bach cantata to combine three corni da caccia with timpani.

An unknown librettist drew mainly from Psalm 146 and from Jakob Ebert's hymn "Du Friedefürst, Herr Jesu Christ" to develop seven movements, supplying only two of the movements himself. The text assembly is similar to Bach's early cantatas. The cantata is in seven movements which combine the three major text sources: psalm, hymn and contemporary poetry. The opening chorus is based on a psalm verse, followed by the first hymn stanza and another psalm verse as a recitative. An aria on poetry is followed by a third psalm verse as an aria. It is followed by another aria on poetry, which simultaneously quotes the hymn tune instrumentally. The last movement combines elements of a chorale fantasia on the third stanza of the hymn, with vivid counterpoint of "Hallelujah" which closes the psalm.

== History and text ==
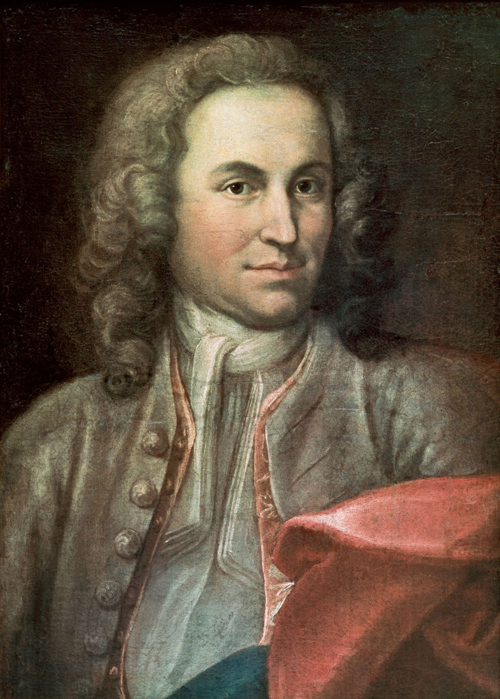
Portrait of the young Bach (disputed)

Bach wrote the cantata for New Year's Day, which is also the Feast of the Circumcision of Christ. The prescribed readings for the day were from the Epistle to the Galatians, "by faith we inherit" (Galatians 3:23–29), and from the Gospel of Luke, the circumcision and naming of Jesus eight days after his birth. However, most of the text for the cantata was taken by the unknown librettist from Psalms 146, and from Jakob Ebert's hymn "Du Friedefürst, Herr Jesu Christ", written in 1601.

The text is compiled from psalm verses (verse 1 for movement 1, verse 5 for movement 3, and verse 10 for movement 5), and two stanzas from the hymn, the first as movement 2, the third as the final movement. Only movements 4 and 6 are free poetry, with the hymn tune sounding again instrumentally during movement 6. Due to its text structure, the Bach scholar Christoph Wolff dates the work to around 1710, when Bach was working at Weimar.

The oldest (and also the only) manuscript was written in 1762, after Bach's death. The provenance of the cantata is disputed: some suggest that it may not be a Bach work because of its "unpretentious" nature and the lack of authoritative original music, or perhaps it was a transposition of an earlier work. Alternatively, part of the cantata may have been written by Bach, while other parts (likely the choruses and the bass aria) were added or amended by other composers. John Eliot Gardiner, who conducted the Bach Cantata Pilgrimage in 2000, remarks on the stylistic similarity of the text structure to Bach's early cantatas written in Mühlhausen. He also sees similar musical expression to the cantata for the inauguration of a new town council there, Gott ist mein König, BWV 71, written in 1708. While some musicologists assume that it may have been composed for the same occasion one year later (documentary evidence suggests that there was such a "lost" work), Gardiner proposes that it could either be a still earlier work, or that it "was, at least in part, an apprentice piece written in Weimar under Bach's direct tutelage.

Bach's 19th-century biographer Philipp Spitta proposed that the cantata was first performed on New Year's Day of 1735. However, according to more recent research, the piece performed that day was Part IV of the Christmas Oratorio.

== Scoring and structure ==
The cantata is scored festively for three vocal soloists (soprano (S), tenor (T), and bass (B)), a four-part choir, and a Baroque instrumental ensemble of three corni da caccia (Co), timpani (Ti, listed with the winds), bassoon (Fg), two violins (Vl), viola (Va) and basso continuo. It is the only Bach cantata to combine three corni da caccia with timpani.

The cantata is structured in seven movements. It begins with a chorus on a verse from the psalm, followed by the first stanza from the hymn, sung by the soprano. Another psalm verse is rendered as a tenor recitative, followed by a tenor aria on free poetry. A third psalm verse is set as a bass aria, answered by another tenor aria on free poetry with an instrumental quotation of the hymn tune. The cantata is closed by a hybrid movement which combines like a chorale fantasia the third stanza of the hymn as cantus firmus with a vivid counterpoint of "Hallelujah" closing the psalm.

In the following table of the movements, the scoring follows the Neue Bach-Ausgabe. The keys and time signatures are taken from Alfred Dürr, using the symbol for common time (4/4). The continuo, playing throughout, is not shown.

Movements of Lobe den Herrn, meine Seele, BWV 143
No.	Title	Text	Type	Vocal	Winds	Strings	Key	Time
1	Lobe den Herrn, meine Seele	Ps. 146:1	Chorus	SATB	3Co Ti Fg	2Vl Va	B-flat major	3/4
2	Du Friedefürst, Herr Jesu Christ	Ebert	Chorale	S		Vl	B-flat major	common time
3	Wohl dem, des Hülfe der Gott Jakob ist	Ps. 146:5	Recitative	T				common time
4	Tausendfaches Unglück, Schrecken	anon.	Aria	T	Fg	2Vl Va	C minor	common time
5	Der Herr ist König ewiglich	Ps. 146:10	Aria	B	3Co Ti Fg		B-flat major	3/4
6	Jesu, Retter deiner Herde	anon.	Aria + chorale (instrumental)	T	3Co Ti Fg	2Vl Va	G minor	common time
7	Gedenk, Herr Jesu, an dein Amt; Halleluja	Ebert; Ps. 146	Chorale fantasia	SATB	3Co Ti Fg	2Vl Va	B-flat major	6/8

== Music ==
The opening chorus on the first verse of the psalm, "Lobe den Herrn, meine Seele" (Praise the Lord, my soul.), is quite short, using imitative fanfare figures without much harmonic development. It employs a ritornello theme on the tonic and dominant chords, incorporating a descending-third sequence. The voices sing mostly in homophony.

The soprano chorale, "Du Friedefürst, Herr Jesu Christ" (O Prince of peace, Lord Jesus Christ), is accompanied by a violin obbligato. Although the vocal line is mostly undecorated, it is accompanied by a rhythmically active violin counterpoint following the circle of fifths. The obbligato line reaches a double cadence before the soprano entrance.

The tenor recitative on another verse from the psalm, "Wohl dem, des Hülfe der Gott Jakob ist" (It is fortunate for him, whose help the God of Jacob is), is quite short and is considered unremarkable.

The fourth movement is a tenor aria in free verse, "Tausendfaches Unglück, Schrecken" (Thousand-fold misfortune, terror). The vocal line is "convoluted and angular", reflecting the themes of misfortune, fear and death. According to the musicologist Julian Mincham, these themes suggest that Salomon Franck may be the poet, as these were recurrent images in his texts, but he also notes a lack of integration atypical of Franck's oeuvre.

The bass aria on the tenth verse from the psalm, "Der Herr ist König ewiglich" (The Lord is King eternally), employs a triadic motif similar to that of Gott ist mein König, BWV 71. It is short and has a limited range of tonal development or chromatic variation. The voice is accompanied by the horns and timpani, without strings, illustrating God's power.

The sixth movement is another tenor aria on free poetry, "Jesu, Retter deiner Herde" (Jesus, saver of Your flock), characterized by the layered scale figuration in the instrumental accompaniment. The voice, bassoon and continuo perform as a trio, while the chorale tune is heard in the violins.

The closing chorus employs the third stanza of the chorale, "Gedenk, Herr, jetzund an dein Amt" (Think, Lord, at this time on Your office), as a cantus firmus in the soprano. It is not composed as the typical four-part setting, but the lower voices sing lively contrasting Alleluias, derived from the psalm.

== Recordings ==
- Frankfurter Kantorei / Bach-Collegium Stuttgart. Die Bach Kantate. Hänssler, 1975.
- Thomanerchor / Neues Bachisches Collegium Musicum. Kantaten / Mit Corno da Caccia. Eterna, 1984.
- Monteverdi Choir / English Baroque Soloists. Bach Cantatas vol. 17. Soli deo Gloria, 2000.
- Amsterdam Baroque Orchestra & Choir. J.S. Bach: Complete Cantatas. Antoine Marchand, 2001.
