= Psalm 146 =

146th psalm of the book of psalms

- "Praise ye the LORD. Praise the LORD, O my soul."
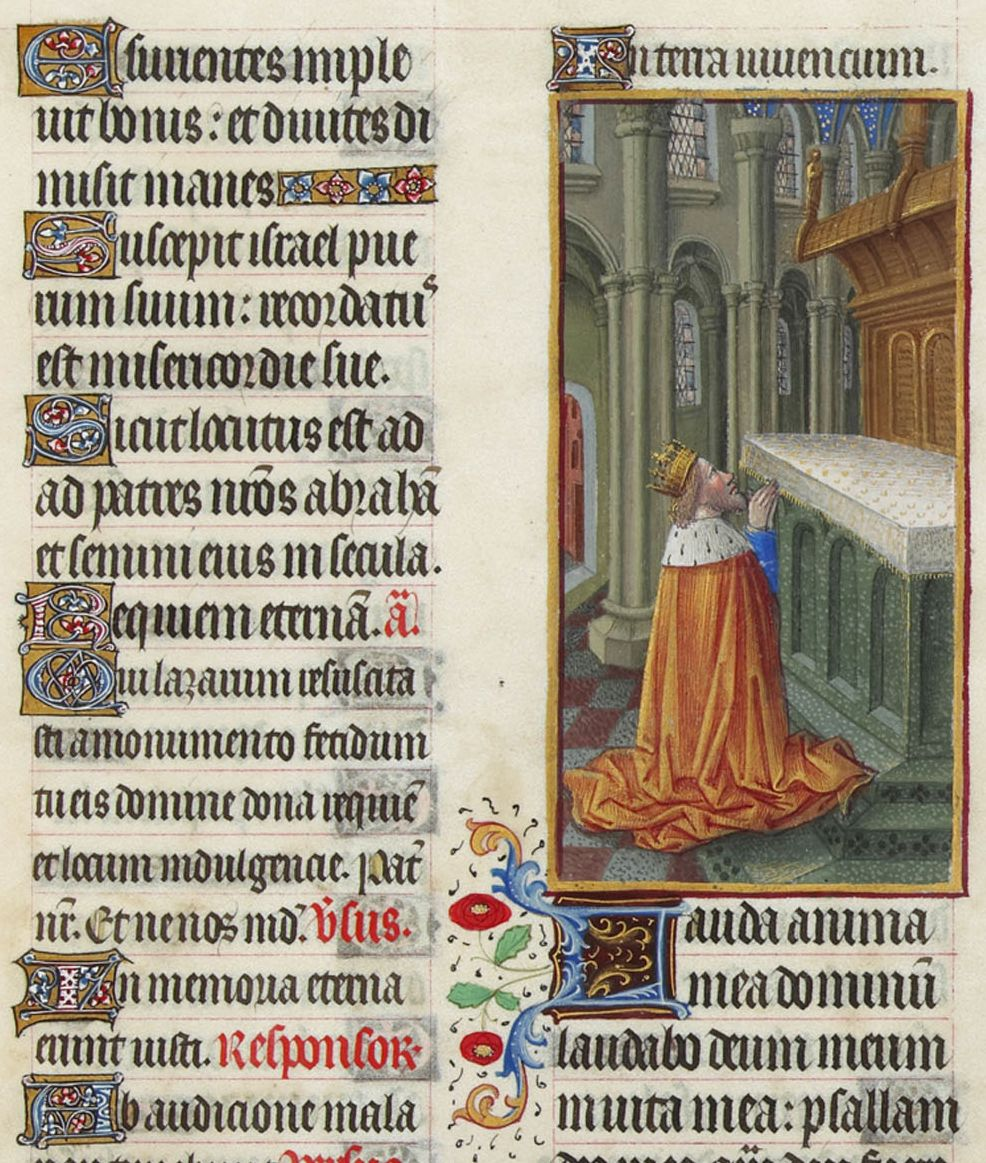
- Psalm 146 in Les Très Riches Heures du duc de Berry
- Other name: Psalm 145; "Lauda anima mea Dominum"
- Language: Hebrew (original)

Psalm 146
- ← Psalm 145 Psalm 147 →
- Book: Book of Psalms
- Hebrew Bible part: Ketuvim
- Order in the Hebrew part: 1
- Category: Sifrei Emet
- Christian Bible part: Old Testament
- Order in the Christian part: 19

Psalm 146 is the 146th psalm of the Book of Psalms, beginning in English in the King James Version, "Praise ye the LORD. Praise the LORD, O my soul". In Latin, it is known as "Lauda anima mea Dominum".

In the slightly different numbering system used in the Greek Septuagint version of the Bible, and in the Latin Vulgate/Vulgata Clementina, this psalm is Psalm 145.

Psalm 146 is used as a regular part of Jewish, Catholic, Lutheran, Anglican and other Protestant liturgies. It has often been set to music, paraphrased in hymns such as Paul Gerhardt's German "Du meine Seele singe" (You my soul sing), and used in cantatas such as Bach's early Lobe den Herrn, meine Seele, BWV 143 (Praise the Lord, my soul).

== Background ==
Psalm 146 is the first of five final concluding praise Psalms in the Book of Psalms. These psalms are not attributed to David; in the Septuagint, Psalms 145 (this psalm) to 148 are given the title "of Haggai and Zechariah". Psalms 146 and 147 are seen by some as twin Psalms. Both psalms draw on images from Isaiah 61 (which Jesus takes as applying to himself in Luke 4), such as setting captives free and opening blind eyes in Psalm 147, and healing the brokenhearted in Psalm 148. Besides Isaiah 61, the themes in this Psalm are also found on Leviticus 25 (the year of Jubilee). This is one of six Psalms involving preaching to self, with the evocative phrase "O my soul" being used. (Note: The six psalms are Psalms 42, 43, 103, 104, 116 and 146.) Preaching to self was highly recommended by Welsh Minister Martyn Lloyd-Jones as he said "Have you realized that most of your unhappiness in life is due to the fact that you are listening to yourself instead of talking to yourself?"

== Uses ==
Ps 146.

=== New Testament ===
- Verse 6 is quoted in the New Testament in Acts 4:24; Acts 14:15

=== Judaism ===
- The psalm in its entirety is recited during Pesukei Dezimra, the initial section of the daily morning prayer service.
- The blessings Pokeiakh Ivrim ("gives sight to the blind"), Matir asurim ("releases the bound"), Zokef kefufim ("straightens the bent"), from the Birkat HaShachar are derived from Psalm 146:7-8.
- Verse 10 is part of Kedusha, and is a part of the third blessing of the High Holidays Amidah.

=== Catholic Church ===
- Since the Middle Ages, this psalm was recited or sung during the vespers office on Thursday, according to the Rule of St. Benedict, established in 530 AD. In the modern Roman Catholic Liturgy of the Hours, Psalm 146 is recited at Morning Prayer on Wednesdays in the fourth and final week of the cycle of liturgical prayers.

=== Book of Common Prayer ===
In the Church of England's Book of Common Prayer, this psalm is appointed to be read on the morning of the thirtieth day of the month.

=== Coptic Orthodox Church ===
In the Agpeya, the Coptic Church's book of hours, this psalm is prayed in the office of Compline and the third watch of the Midnight office. It is also in the prayer of the Veil, which is generally prayed only by monks.

== Musical settings ==
Psalm 146 was paraphrased in Paul Gerhardt's hymn in German "Du meine Seele singe" (You my soul sing), published in 1667 with a melody by Johann Georg Ebeling in the collection Pauli Gerhardi Geistliche-Andachten (Spiritual devotions by Paul Gerhardt).

Heinrich Schütz composed a four-part setting of a metric German version for the Becker Psalter, "Mein Seel soll loben Gott den Herrn (My soul shall praise God the Lord), SWV 251. Johann Sebastian Bach based an early church cantata, Lobe den Herrn, meine Seele, BWV 143 (Praise the Lord, my soul), on verses from the psalm. Carl Philipp Emanuel Bach included a setting for voice and in his collection of 42 psalms, Psalmen mit Melodien, H. 733, completed in 1774. The psalm is titled "Es werde Gott von uns erhoben!" (God shall be exsultet by us).

Alan Hovhaness set portions of this text, along with portions of Psalms 33 and 150, for his work Praise the Lord with Psaltery. Norma Wendelburg set the psalm to music in 1973, as Praise the Lord for mixed chorus and optional organ. Peter Heeren wrote a setting for mixed choir and piano in 2012, Der 146. Psalm.

== Text ==
The following table shows the Hebrew text of the Psalm with vowels, alongside the Koine Greek text in the Septuagint and the English translation from the King James Version. Note that the meaning can slightly differ between these versions, as the Septuagint and the Masoretic Text come from different textual traditions. (Note: A 1917 translation directly from Hebrew to English by the Jewish Publication Society can be found here or here, and an 1844 translation directly from the Septuagint by L. C. L. Brenton can be found here. Both translations are in the public domain.) In the Septuagint, this psalm is numbered Psalm 145.

| # | Hebrew | English | Greek |
|---|---|---|---|
| 1 | הַֽלְלוּ־יָ֡הּ הַֽלְלִ֥י נַ֝פְשִׁ֗י אֶת־יְהֹוָֽה׃ | Praise ye the LORD. Praise the LORD, O my soul. | ᾿Αλληλούϊα· ᾿Αγγαίου καὶ Ζαχαρίου. - ΑΙΝΕΙ, ἡ ψυχή μου, τὸν Κύριον· |
| 2 | אֲהַלְלָ֣ה יְהֹוָ֣ה בְּחַיָּ֑י אֲזַמְּרָ֖ה לֵאלֹהַ֣י בְּעוֹדִֽי׃ | While I live will I praise the LORD: I will sing praises unto my God while I have any being. | αἰνέσω Κύριον ἐν τῇ ζωῇ μου, ψαλῶ τῷ Θεῷ μου ἕως ὑπάρχω. |
| 3 | אַל־תִּבְטְח֥וּ בִנְדִיבִ֑ים בְּבֶן־אָדָ֓ם ׀ שֶׁ֤אֵ֖ין ל֥וֹ תְשׁוּעָֽה׃ | Put not your trust in princes, nor in the son of man, in whom there is no help. | μὴ πεποίθατε ἐπ᾿ ἄρχοντας, ἐπὶ υἱοὺς ἀνθρώπων, οἷς οὐκ ἔστι σωτηρία. |
| 4 | תֵּצֵ֣א ר֭וּחוֹ יָשֻׁ֣ב לְאַדְמָת֑וֹ בַּיּ֥וֹם הַ֝ה֗וּא אָבְד֥וּ עֶשְׁתֹּֽנֹתָֽיו׃ | His breath goeth forth, he returneth to his earth; in that very day his thoughts perish. | ἐξελεύσεται τὸ πνεῦμα αὐτοῦ. καὶ ἐπιστρέψει εἰς τὴν γῆν αὐτοῦ· ἐν ἐκείνῃ τῇ ἡμέρᾳ ἀπολοῦνται πάντες οἱ διαλογισμοὶ αὐτοῦ. |
| 5 | אַשְׁרֵ֗י שֶׁ֤אֵ֣ל יַעֲקֹ֣ב בְּעֶזְר֑וֹ שִׂ֝בְר֗וֹ עַל־יְהֹוָ֥ה אֱלֹהָֽיו׃ | Happy is he that hath the God of Jacob for his help, whose hope is in the LORD his God: | μακάριος οὗ ὁ Θεὸς ᾿Ιακὼβ βοηθὸς αὐτοῦ, ἡ ἐλπὶς αὐτοῦ ἐπὶ Κύριον τὸν Θεὸν αὐτοῦ |
| 6 | עֹשֶׂ֤ה ׀ שָׁ֘מַ֤יִם וָאָ֗רֶץ אֶת־הַיָּ֥ם וְאֶת־כׇּל־אֲשֶׁר־בָּ֑ם הַשֹּׁמֵ֖ר אֱמֶ֣ת לְעוֹלָֽם׃ | Which made heaven, and earth, the sea, and all that therein is: which keepeth truth for ever: | τὸν ποιήσαντα τὸν οὐρανὸν καὶ τὴν γῆν, τὴν θάλασσαν καὶ πάντα τὰ ἐν αὐτοῖς· τὸν φυλάσσοντα ἀλήθειαν εἰς τὸν αἰῶνα, |
| 7 | עֹשֶׂ֤ה מִשְׁפָּ֨ט ׀ לָעֲשׁוּקִ֗ים נֹתֵ֣ן לֶ֭חֶם לָרְעֵבִ֑ים יְ֝הֹוָ֗ה מַתִּ֥יר אֲסוּרִֽים׃ | Which executeth judgment for the oppressed: which giveth food to the hungry. The LORD looseth the prisoners: | ποιοῦντα κρῖμα τοῖς ἀδικουμένοις, διδόντα τροφὴν τοῖς πεινῶσι. Κύριος λύει πεπεδημένους, |
| 8 | יְהֹוָ֤ה ׀ פֹּ֘קֵ֤חַ עִוְרִ֗ים יְ֭הֹוָה זֹקֵ֣ף כְּפוּפִ֑ים יְ֝הֹוָ֗ה אֹהֵ֥ב צַדִּיקִֽים׃ | The LORD openeth the eyes of the blind: the LORD raiseth them that are bowed down: the LORD loveth the righteous: | Κύριος σοφοῖ τυφλούς, Κύριος ἀνορθοῖ κατερραγμένους, Κύριος ἀγαπᾷ δικαίους, |
| 9 | יְהֹוָ֤ה ׀ שֹׁ֘מֵ֤ר אֶת־גֵּרִ֗ים יָת֣וֹם וְאַלְמָנָ֣ה יְעוֹדֵ֑ד וְדֶ֖רֶךְ רְשָׁעִ֣ים יְעַוֵּֽת׃ | The LORD preserveth the strangers; he relieveth the fatherless and widow: but the way of the wicked he turneth upside down. | Κύριος φυλάσσει τοὺς προσηλύτους· ὀρφανὸν καὶ χήραν ἀναλήψεται καὶ ὁδὸν ἁμαρτωλῶν ἀφανιεῖ. |
| 10 | יִמְלֹ֤ךְ יְהֹוָ֨ה ׀ לְעוֹלָ֗ם אֱלֹהַ֣יִךְ צִ֭יּוֹן לְדֹ֥ר וָדֹ֗ר הַֽלְלוּ־יָֽהּ׃ | The LORD shall reign for ever, even thy God, O Zion, unto all generations. Praise ye the LORD. | βασιλεύσει Κύριος εἰς τὸν αἰῶνα, ὁ Θεός σου, Σιών, εἰς γενεὰν καὶ γενεάν. |

=== Verse 2 ===
While I live I will praise the Lord;
I will sing praises to my God while I have my being.

The wording of Psalm 104:33 is "almost identical".
