= Du meine Seele singe =

German hymn by Paul Gerhardt

- German hymn by Paul Gerhardt
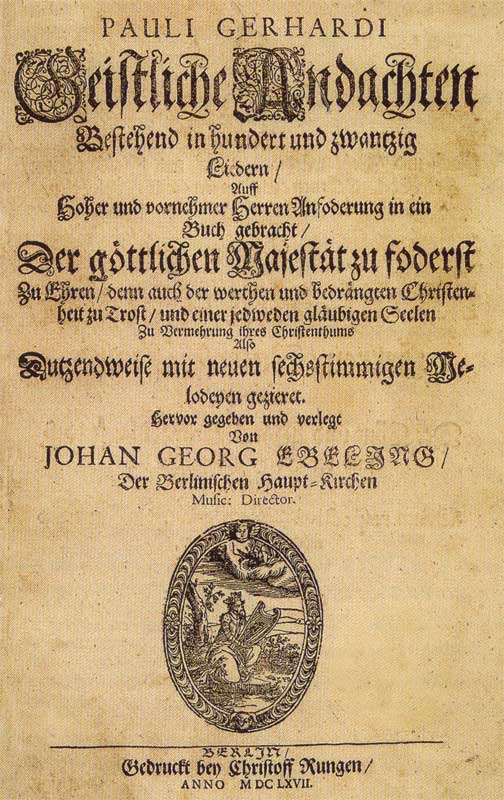
- The title page of the first publication in 1667
- English: You my soul sing
- Text: by Paul Gerhardt
- Language: German
- Based on: Psalm 146
- Meter: 7 6 7 6
- Melody: by Johann Georg Ebeling
- Composed: 1666

"Du meine Seele singe" (You my soul sing) is a hymn in German by Paul Gerhardt, a paraphrase of Psalm 146. Johann Georg Ebeling wrote the well-known melody in 1666. The song in 10 stanzas was first published in 1667 in the collection Pauli Gerhardi Geistliche-Andachten (Spiritual devotions by Paul Gerhardt) of songs by Gerhardt. It is No. 302 in the current Protestant hymnal Evangelisches Gesangbuch.

== History and text ==
Paul Gerhardt wrote the hymn as a paraphrase of Psalm 146, in 1653, five years after the end of the Thirty Years War, when he was a minister in Mittenwalde, south of Berlin. Johann Georg Ebeling, a church musician at the Nikolaikirche, wrote the well-known melody in 1666. The song in 10 stanzas with eight regular lines each was first published in 1667 in the collection Geistliche-Andachten (Spiritual devotions) of songs by Gerhardt. It is, shortened to eight stanzas, No. 302 in the current Protestant hymnal Evangelisches Gesangbuch.

The first stanza, expressing the request to the own soul to sing beautifully praising the creator for life, corresponds to verses 1 and 2 of the psalm (Psalms 146:1–2). Stanzas 2 and 3 are not part of the current Protestant hymnal. The fourth stanza, about trust in the God of Jacob as the highest treasure, granting eternal content ("ewig unbetrübt"), corresponds to verses 5 and 6 (Psalms 146:5–6). Stanzas five to seven expand the good things God does, namely protecting those who suffer violence, feeding the hungry and setting prisoners free, corresponding to verse 7 (Psalms 146:7). Stanzas eight and nine mention the light for the blind and comforter of the weak, strangers, orphans and widows as in verses 8 and 9 (Psalms 146:8–9). The last stanza, corresponding to verse 10 (Psalms 146:10), compares the singer to a wilted flower, who will not cease to add to the praise of God.

== Tune and settings ==
The tune (in B♭-major or C major) begins with a rising broken chord, reaching the tenth on the fifth note, which has been called a "rocket" motif. It follows the structure of the bar form. For the last two lines, the melody is similar in shape to the first two lines, again rising to the highest note in five steps and holding it for two beats. In the first stanza this accents the term "being" in "My heart and whole being" ("Mein Herz und ganzes Wesen").

Other hymns on the same melody include "Lift up your hearts, ye people", "We stand united with you" and "Give thanks to God, the Father".
