= Karl Friedrich Schall =

- Born: March 16, 1859; Öhringen, Kingdom of Württemberg
- Died: September 19, 1925 (aged 66); Oberhofen am Thunersee, Switzerland
- Occupation: Engineer

Karl Friedrich Schall (16 March 1859 – 19 September 1925) was a German precision engineer and co-founder of the company Reiniger, Gebbert & Schall (RGS) in Erlangen. RGS was a manufacturer and supplier of durable medical equipment and a pioneer in the supply of x-ray equipment worldwide with offices in Berlin, Wien, London, Paris, Rome, Chicago and Sydney.

== Life and times ==
Schall was born in 1859 at Öhringen in the Kingdom of Württemberg as the son of the lawyer William Schall. From 1877 to 1879, he was in Tübingen as a university mechanic and apprenticed as a precision mechanic. During 1880–1881, Schall completed the mandatory one-year volunteer service in the military, and travelled to Paris, London and Switzerland. On 24 January 1887, at Dresden he married Johanna Schmidlin (born 18 October 1859 in Giessbach – died June 1934 in Oberhofen). The couple had three children: Wilhelm, later called William (21 April 1888 – 2 December 1965), Mary Jane (27 May 1889 – October 1927) and Margarete (25 December 1890 – 21 March 1937). In 1893, Schall became a British citizen.

== Reiniger, Gebbert and Schall ==
In 1883, Schall returned to Stuttgart, and opened his own workshop for forehead, mouth and laryngeal lamps. In 1885, he joined with the mechanic Max Gebbert, whom he had met in Paris, as an equal partner in a new company, Gebbert and Schall.

In September 1885, Schall and Gebbert trained Erwin Moritz Reiniger, who ran a similar workshop for electrical and physical devices in Erlangen. In 1877, Reiniger, age 23, after attending the Erlanger University, established a factory to supply the university with medical equipment. The newly-formed partnership Reiniger, Gebbert & Schall was based in "Erlangen, Stuttgart, New York," and described as "physical-mechanical workshops, Reiniger, Gebbert & Schall." The workshops in Stuttgart and New York, however, were soon abandoned. Schall led the joint company, and assisted in equipment fabrication and sales.

In 1893, the company moved from the central city to a new factory at 45 Luitpoldstrasse, a location that would become an Erlangen landmark. By 1900, the company was one of the leading manufacturers and producers of x-ray equipment in the world. The company became involved in the production of x-ray equipment due to Gebbert's foresight, who directly contacted Wilhelm Röntgen shortly after the discovery of x-rays in 1895. Within a few months, RGS was producing x-ray tubes and related apparatus at Erlangen. The company went on to establish a collaboration with the Erlangen Frauenklinic (Women's Clinic) to perform early studies in radiation therapy.

== K. Schall of Wigmore Street ==
In 1888, Schall moved to London to open with his own capital, an agency of the RGS company for Great Britain and the colonies. Reference is made to the use of a Joseph Leiter's (renowned instrument maker from Vienna) endoscope, illuminated with electric light, that was borrowed from Mr. K. Schall of 55 Wigmore Street in London. Schall was Leiter's agent in England. Schall also supplied a Leiter irrigating cystoscope. He was so successful that he was able to achieve 50% of total sales for the RGS company. The RGS agency in London existed until 1910.

On 7 November 1896, in the British Medical Journal, reference is made to a pamphlet available from K. Schall that offers radiographic equipment. In 1900, the text Electricity in Gynaecology refers to a Leclanché cell made by Mr. K. Schall, of Wigmore Street.

On 1 July 1905, the Journal of the Röntgen Society listed as members: K. Schall, 35, Great Marylebone Street, W. and Frank K. Schmidlin, 83, Elizabeth Street, Sydney, NSW. In 1905, K. Schall offered an assortment of medical apparatus.

In July 1911, Dr. E. S. Worrall refers to the utilisation of apparatus to produce radiograms in very short exposure times, a half or a quarter of a second. Worrall stated that in 1896, a typical exposure was 15 minutes. Worrall employed equipment supplied by Messrs. K. Schall and Son and hoped to achieve exposure times of 1/100 or 1/250 of a second or even less. In 1912, Karl Schall handed over the management of the London firm to his son William E. Schall and moved to Oberhofen, Switzerland. He died in 1925 at Oberhofen am Thunersee, Switzerland.
