= Du Friedefürst, Herr Jesu Christ, BWV 116 =

Chorale cantate by Johann Sebastian Bach

Du Friedefürst, Herr Jesu Christ
- BWV 116
- Chorale cantata by J. S. Bach
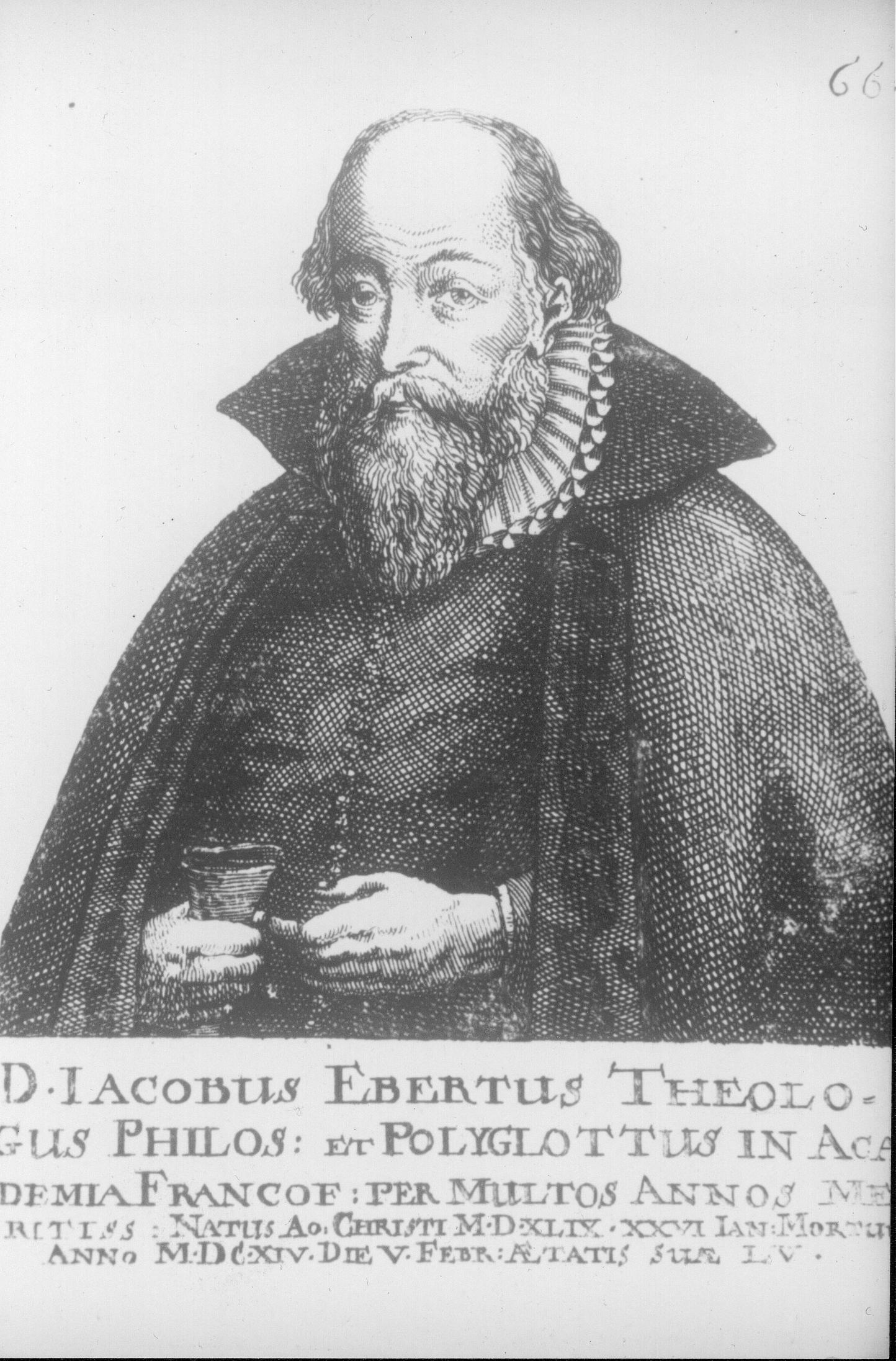
- Jakob Ebert, the author of the hymn
- Occasion: 25th Sunday after Trinity
- Chorale: "Du Friedefürst, Herr Jesu Christ" by Jakob Ebert
- Performed: 26 November 1724: Leipzig
- Movements: 6
- Vocal: SATB choir and solo
- Instrumental: horn; 2 oboes d'amore; 2 violins; viola; continuo

Johann Sebastian Bach composed the church cantata Du Friedefürst, Herr Jesu Christ (You Prince of Peace, Lord Jesus Christ), BWV 116, in Leipzig for the 25th Sunday after Trinity. He led the first performance on 26 November 1724, concluding the liturgical year of 1724.

The cantata is based upon Jakob Ebert's hymn "Du Friedefürst, Herr Jesu Christ". It matches the Sunday's prescribed gospel reading, the Tribulation from the Gospel of Matthew, in a general way. The hymn's first and last stanzas are retained unchanged in both text and tune: the former is set as a chorale fantasia, the latter as a four-part closing chorale. An unknown librettist paraphrased the inner stanzas as alternating arias and recitatives. Bach scored the cantata for four vocal soloists (soprano, alto, tenor, bass), a four-part choir and a Baroque instrumental ensemble of natural horn enforcing the soprano in the hymn tune, two oboes d'amore, strings, and basso continuo.

== History and text ==
Bach wrote the cantata in 1724 for the 25th Sunday after Trinity as part of his second annual cycle, the chorale cantata cycle. The prescribed readings for the Sunday were from the First Epistle to the Thessalonians, the coming of the Lord (1 Thessalonians 4:13–18), and from the Gospel of Matthew, the Tribulation (Matthew 24:25–28). The cantata text of an unknown author is based exclusively on Jakob Ebert's hymn in seven stanzas (1601). The librettist of Bach's chorale cantata cycle is not known, but Bach scholar Christoph Wolff noted that "he must have worked closely with Bach" and named as "the most likely candidate" Andreas Stöbel, a co-rector of the Thomasschule. The first and last stanza in their original wording are the outer movements, stanzas 2 to 4 were transformed to movements 2 to 4, and stanzas 5 and 6 were rephrased for movement 5. The hymn is in a general way related to the gospel.

Bach led the first performance of the cantata on 26 November 1724, which was that year the last Sunday of the liturgical year. The parts show that Bach performed it at least once more but not until after 1740.

== Music ==
=== Structure and scoring ===
Bach structured the cantata in six movements. The text and tune of the hymn are retained in the outer choral movements, a chorale fantasia and a four-part closing chorale, which frame a sequence of alternating arias and recitatives. Bach scored the work for four vocal soloists (soprano, alto, tenor, bass), a four-part choir and a Baroque instrumental ensemble of natural horn (Co) reinforcing the soprano in the hymn tune, two oboes d'amore (Oa), two violins (Vl), viola (Va) and basso continuo. The title page of the autograph score reads: "Dom: 25 post Trinit. / Du Friede Fürst Herr Jesu / Christ ect. / à / 4 Voc: / ~~Tromba~~ / 2 Hautb: d'Amour / 2 Violini / viola / con / Continuo / di / Sign: / J.S.Bach".

In the following table of the movements, the scoring follows the Neue Bach-Ausgabe. The keys and time signatures are taken from Alfred Dürr, using the symbol for common time (4/4). The continuo, playing throughout, is not shown.

Movements of Du Friedefürst, Herr Jesu Christ
No.	Title	Text	Type	Vocal	Winds	Strings	Key	Time
1	Du Friedefürst, Herr Jesu Christ	Ebert	Chorale fantasia	SATB	Co 2Oa	2Vl Va	A major	common time
2	Ach, unaussprechlich ist die Not	anon.	Aria	A	Oa		F-sharp minor	3/4
3	Gedenke doch, o Jesu	anon.	Recitative	T				common time
4	Ach, wir bekennen unsre Schuld	anon	Aria (Terzetto)	S T B			E major	3/4
5	Ach, laß uns durch die scharfen Ruten	anon.	Recitative	A		2Vl Va		common time
6	Erleucht auch unser Sinn und Herz	Ebert	Chorale	SATB	Co 2Oa	2Vl Va	A major	common time

=== 1 ===
The opening chorus, "Du Friedefürst, Herr Jesu Christ" (You Prince of Peace, Lord Jesus Christ), is a chorale fantasia, the soprano singing the cantus firmus, supported by the horn. The composer of the tune is not known. It appeared in a hymnal by Bartholomäus Gesius in 1601, and is similar to "Innsbruck, ich muß dich lassen".

The melody is embedded in an orchestral concerto with ritornellos and interludes, dominated by the concertante solo violin. The treatment of the lower voices is varied within the movement. In lines 1 and 2 and the final 7 they are set in homophonic block chords. The Bach scholar Klaus Hofmann notes that the salutation "Du Friedefürst, Herr Jesu Christ, wahr' Mensch und wahrer Gott" (You prince of peace, Lord Jesus Christ, true man and true God) thus receives weight. In lines 3 and 4 the lower voices begin in vivid imitation before the entrance of the cantus firmus. In lines 5 and 6 their faster movement contrasts to the melody.

=== 2 ===
The alto aria, "Ach, unaussprechlich ist die Not" (Alas, the agony is unspeakable), is accompanied by an oboe d'amore as an equal partner, expressing the soul's terror imagining the judgement. Hofmann notes that "Bach has captured the expression of deep sadness in the music with all the tools of his trade: sighing figures, suspensions and augmented, diminished or chromatic melodic intervals: the harmony is full of dissonances."

=== 3 ===
The recitative for tenor, "Gedenke doch, o Jesu" (Yet consider, o Jesus), begins as a secco recitative, but the idea "Gedenke doch, o Jesu, daß du noch ein Fürst des Friedens heißest!" (Yet consider, o Jesus, that you are still called a Prince of Peace!), close to the theme of the cantata, is accompanied by a quote of the chorale tune in the continuo.

=== 4 ===
Rare in Bach's cantatas, three voices sing a trio. In the text "Ach, wir bekennen unsre Schuld" (Ah, we recognize our guilt)", they illustrate the "wir" (we), confessing and asking forgiveness together. The voices are accompanied only by the continuo.

=== 5 ===
The recitative for alto, "Ach, laß uns durch die scharfen Ruten" (Ah, then through the harsh rod), is a prayer for lasting peace, accompanied by the strings and ending as an arioso.

=== 6 ===
The closing chorale, "Erleucht auch unser Sinn und Herz" (Illumine our minds and hearts as well), is a four-part setting for the choir, horn, oboes and strings.

== Recordings ==
The listing is taken from the selection on the Bach-Cantatas website. Ensembles playing period instruments in historically informed performances are marked by green background.

Recordings of Du Friedefürst, Herr Jesu Christ
Title	Conductor / Choir / Orchestra	Soloists	Label	Year	Instr.
Bach Cantatas Vol. 5 – Sundays after Trinity II	Karl Richter Münchener Bach-Chor Münchener Bach-Orchester	Edith Mathis; Trudeliese Schmidt; Peter Schreier; Dietrich Fischer-Dieskau	Archiv Produktion	1978	
Die Bach Kantate Vol. 58	Helmuth Rilling Gächinger Kantorei Bach-Collegium Stuttgart	Arleen Augér; Helen Watts; Lutz-Michael Harder; Philippe Huttenlocher	Hänssler	1980	
J. S. Bach: Das Kantatenwerk • Complete Cantatas • Les Cantates, Folge / Vol. 20	Nikolaus Harnoncourt Tölzer Knabenchor Concentus Musicus Wien	soloist of the Tölzer Knabenchor; Paul Esswood; Kurt Equiluz; Philippe Huttenlocher	Teldec	1981	Period
Bach Edition Vol. 9 – Cantatas Vol. 4	Pieter Jan Leusink Holland Boys Choir Netherlands Bach Collegium	Ruth Holton; Sytse Buwalda; Knut Schoch; Bas Ramselaar	Brilliant Classics	1999	Period
J. S. Bach: Complete Cantatas Vol. 12	Ton Koopman Amsterdam Baroque Orchestra & Choir	Sibylla Rubens; Annette Markert; Christoph Prégardien; Klaus Mertens	Antoine Marchand	2000	Period
Bach Cantatas Vol. 9: Lund / Leipzig / For the 17th Sunday after Trinity / For the 18th Sunday after Trinity	John Eliot Gardiner Monteverdi Choir English Baroque Soloists	Katharine Fuge; Nathalie Stutzmann; Christoph Genz; Gotthold Schwarz	Soli Deo Gloria	2000	Period
J. S. Bach: Cantatas Vol. 28 – Cantatas from Leipzig 1724 – BWV 26, 62, 116, 139	Masaaki Suzuki Bach Collegium Japan	Yukari Nonoshita; Robin Blaze; Makoto Sakurada; Peter Kooy	BIS	2004	Period

== Sources ==
- Du Friedefürst, Herr Jesu Christ, BWV 116: Scores at the International Music Score Library Project
- Du Friedefürst, Herr Jesu Christ BWV 116; BC A 164 / Chorale cantata (25th Sunday after Trinity) Leipzig University
- Du Friedefürst, Herr Jesu Christ, BWV 116 English translation, University of Vermont
- Luke Dahn: BWV 116.6 bach-chorales.com
