= Jakob Ebert =

German theologian and poet

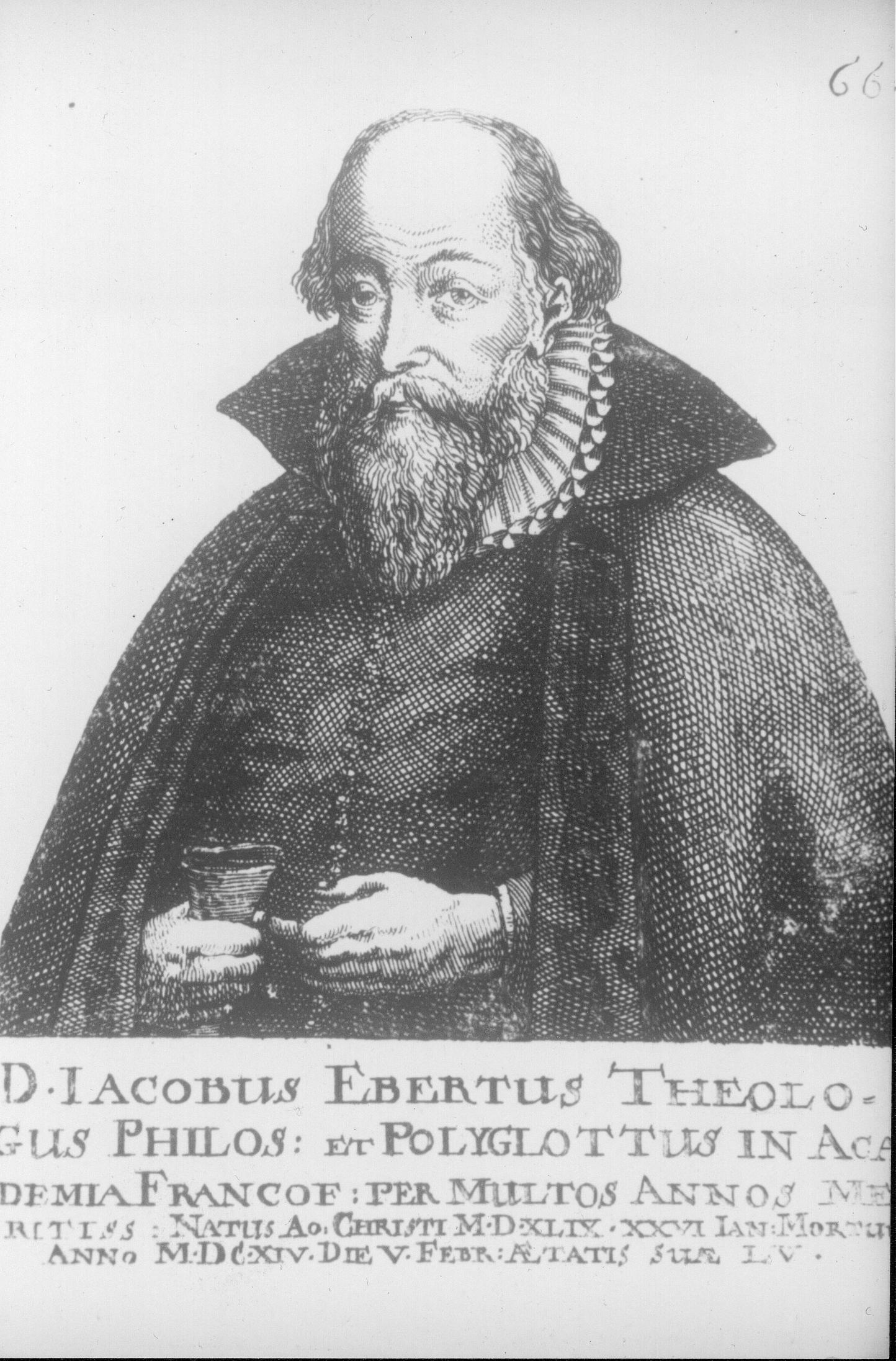
Jakob Ebert

Jakob Ebert (26 January 1549 – 5 February 1614) was a German theologian and poet.

== Life ==
Born in Sprottau, Ebert was the son of Andreas Ebertus. He was school director in Soldin, Schwiebus and Grünberg. From 1594 he was on the faculty of the university Alma Mater Viadrina in Frankfurt (Oder), teaching theology.

== Hymns ==
Ebert was the author of the hymn "Du Friedefürst, Herr Jesu Christ", which appeared in 1601 with a melody by Bartholomäus Gesius. Composers using this hymn included Dietrich Buxtehude (BuxW 20 and 21) and Johann Sebastian Bach, who based a chorale cantata on it, Du Friedefürst, Herr Jesu Christ, BWV 116, and used it in several other cantatas.

== Literature ==
- Friedrich Wilhelm Bautz (1975). "EBERT, Jakob". In Bautz, Friedrich Wilhelm (ed.). Biographisch-Bibliographisches Kirchenlexikon (BBKL) (in German). Vol. 1. Hamm: Bautz. col. 1446. ISBN 3-88309-013-1.
