= Catherine Winkworth =

English hymn translator (1827–1878)

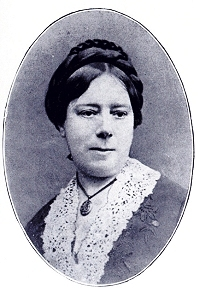
- Born: 13 September 1827; London, England
- Died: 1 July 1878 (aged 50); Geneva, Switzerland
- Venerated in: Evangelical Lutheran Church in America
- Feast: 1 July

Catherine Winkworth (13 September 1827 – 1 July 1878) was an English hymnwriter and educator. She translated the German chorale tradition of church hymns for English speakers, for which she is recognized in the calendar of the Evangelical Lutheran Church in America. She also worked for wider educational opportunities for girls, and translated biographies of two founders of religious sisterhoods. When 16, Winkworth appears to have coined a once well-known political pun, peccavi, "I have Sindh", relating to the British occupation of Sindh in colonial India.

== Early life ==
Catherine Winkworth was born on 13 September 1827 at 20 Ely Place, Holborn on the edge of the City of London. She was the fourth daughter of Henry Winkworth, a silk merchant. Henry's third daughter, Selina Mary, was the mother of Norman Collie. Another sister Susanna Winkworth (1820–1884) was also a translator, mainly of German devotional works.

In 1829, her family moved to Manchester, where her father had a silk mill and which city figured in the Industrial Revolution. Winkworth studied under the Rev. William Gaskell, minister of Cross Street Chapel, and with Dr. James Martineau, both of them eminent British Unitarians. Urban historian Harold L. Platt notes that in the Victorian period "The importance of membership in this Unitarian congregation cannot be overstated: as the fountainhead of Manchester Liberalism it exerted tremendous influence on the city and the nation for a generation."

She subsequently moved with the family to Clifton, near Bristol.

== Chorale tradition ==
Catherine Winkworth spent a year in Dresden, during which time she took an interest in German hymnody. Around 1854, she published her book Lyra Germanica, a collection of German hymns which she had chosen and translated into English. A further collection followed in 1858. During 1863, she published The Chorale Book for England, which was coedited by the composers William Sterndale Bennett and Otto Goldschmidt. In 1869 she followed this with Christian Singers of Germany.

According to The Harvard University Hymn Book, Winkworth "did more than any other single individual to make the rich heritage of German hymnody available to the English-speaking world." Four examples of translations by her hand are published in The Church Hymn Book 1872 (Nos 344, 431, 664 and 807).

Among the best-known chorales translated by Winkworth are "From Heaven Above to Earth I Come" ("Vom Himmel hoch, da komm ich her", Martin Luther, 1534); "Wake, Awake, for Night Is Flying" ("Wachet auf, ruft uns die Stimme", Philipp Nicolai, 1599); "How Brightly Beams the Morning Star!" ("Wie schön leuchtet der Morgenstern", Nicolai, 1597); and the Christmas hymn "A Spotless Rose" ("Es ist ein Ros entsprungen", anon, 1599). She translated Gerhardt's "Die güldne Sonne voll Freud und Wonne" into "The golden sunbeams with their joyous gleams".

== Women's education ==
Winkworth was also involved deeply in promoting women's education. She was one of the ten founder members of the Clifton Committee to promote the Higher Education of Women in 1868, becoming its Secretary from 1870. This group, led by the educational reformer John Percival, was a major force behind the foundation of University College Bristol in 1876. Winkworth was a Council member of Cheltenham Ladies' College from 1875, and helped found Clifton High School for Girls in 1877-8, where a school house is named after her. She was likewise governor of the Red Maids' School in Westbury-on-Trym in the city of Bristol.

Winkworth translated biographies of two founders of sisterhoods for the poor and the sick: Life of Pastor Fliedner, 1861, and Life of Amelia Sieveking, 1863.

Winkworth has been described as "an early feminist".

== Peccavi ==
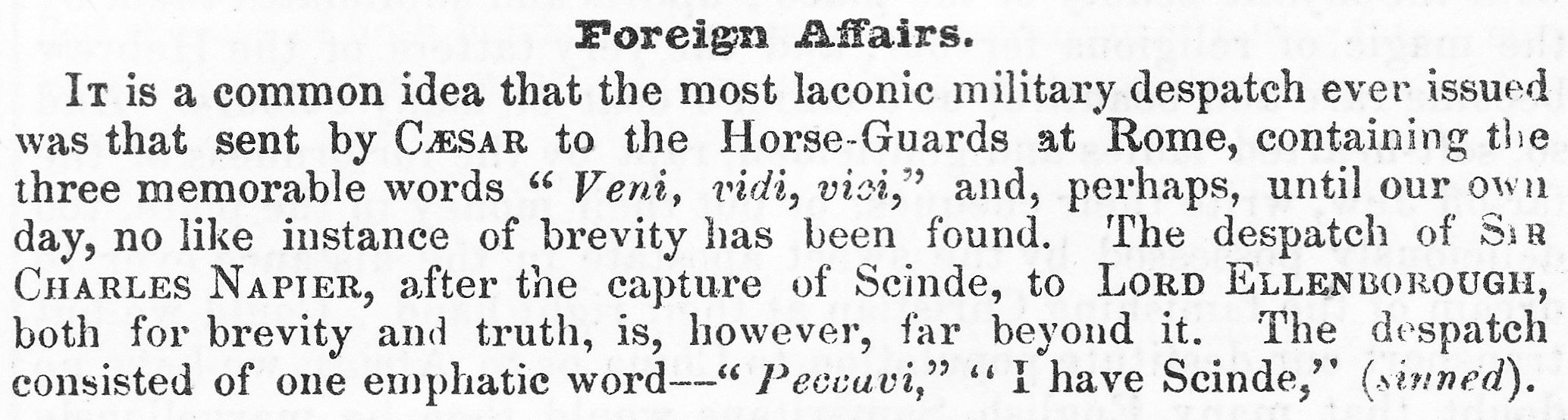
Punch, 18 May 1844

According to the Encyclopedia of Britain by Bamber Gascoigne (1993), it was Catherine Winkworth who, learning of General Charles James Napier's ruthless and unauthorised, but successful campaign to conquer the Indian province of Sindh, "remarked to her teacher that Napier's despatch to the governor-general of India, after capturing Sindh, should have been Peccavi" (Latin for "I have sinned": a pun on "I have Sindh"). She sent her joke to the new humorous magazine Punch, which printed it on 18 May 1844. She was then sixteen years old.

The Oxford Dictionary of Quotations attributes this to Winkworth, noting that it was assigned to her in Notes and Queries in May 1954.

The pun has usually been credited to Napier himself. The rumour's persistence over the decades led to investigations in Calcutta archives, as well as comments by William Lee-Warner in 1917 and Lord Zetland, Secretary of State for India, in 1936.

== Death ==
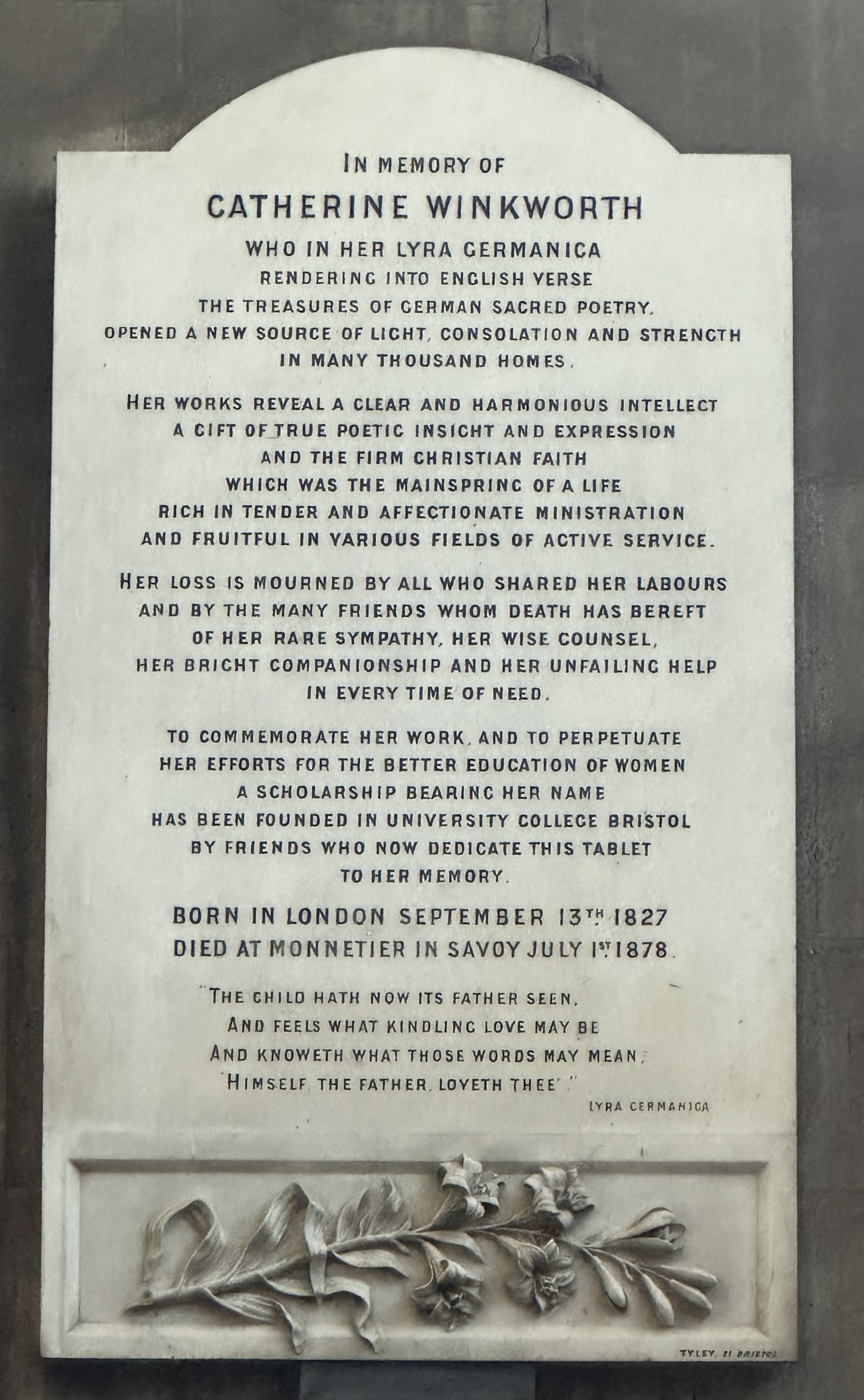
Winkworth's memorial tablet, Bristol Cathedral, 1878

Winkworth died suddenly of heart disease near Geneva on 1 July 1878 and was buried in Monnetier, in Upper Savoy. A monument to her memory was erected in Bristol Cathedral. She is commemorated on the Calendar of Saints of the Evangelical Lutheran Church in America on 1 July.

In 1883, Winkworth's sister, Susanna Winkworth, privately published a volume of letters and other memorials relating to Catherine early life, covering the period up to 1855. This was intended only for family consumption, with the intent that 'Vol. I' would be followed by later volumes. However, Susanna died in 1884, terminating this project. Some of the letters in this early volume, along with others covering the later lives and activities of Catherine and Susanna, were published in 1908 by their niece, Margaret Shaen.

== Hymn books ==
- Lyra Germanica, Hymns for the Sundays and chief festivals of the Christian Year, Translated from the German, 1855 edition compiled by Catherine Winkworth
- The Chorale Book for England: A Complete Hymn-book for Public and Private Worship, Catherine Winkworth, William Sterndale Bennett and Otto Goldschmidt (1863)
- Lyra Germanica: the Christian life, Catherine Winkworth (1868)
- Christian Singers of Germany, Catherine Winkworth (1869)
- Songs for the household: Sacred poetry, Catherine Winkworth (1882)
