= Ulrich Stötzel =

German organist and conductor

Ulrich Stötzel (born 6 June 1952) is a German organist and conductor.

== Life ==
Born in Siegen, Stötzel studied church music at the Frankfurt University of Music and Performing Arts and passed the A-Examination there. This was followed by postgraduate studies in the master classes of Edgar Krapp and Helmuth Rilling with a final organ concert exam and choral conducting diploma.

Since 1973, Stötzel has formed the Bach-Chor Siegen, which counts up to about 120 singers and has released more than a dozen classical concept albums as well as complete recordings. Due to his special merits, he was awarded the title of Kirchenmusikdirektor of the Evangelische Kirche von Westfalen.

Stötzel has been retired since summer 2019.
