= Frank K. Schmidlin =

Australian X-ray pioneer (1861–1939)

Frank K. Schmidlin (1861-1939) was an Australian X-ray pioneer, that was among the first to utilize the new technology of x-rays for medical applications.

In Australia, the medical men of the day took a slow approach in the adoption of the new science that involved x-rays. Many of the early demonstrations were made by investigators outside the medical field. Upon examination of the initial investigators, several key factors were common. The individuals had already either been experimenting along similar lines to Wilhelm Röntgen with Crookes tubes and such, the physicists or scientists, or were actively associated with electrical work, the electricians, which made them particularly receptive to the technical appeal of the new science of x-rays. Records of the events reveal that among the medical men who witnessed the first images produced as radiographs, a rather small number had any great desire to employ X-rays directly in their own medical practice.

After the early investigative work of Thomas Ranken Lyle, William Henry Bragg, Joseph Patrick Slattery, and others, almost all medical men were satisfied with soliciting the services of the external X-ray man when necessity arose for skiagraphs to be produced. As the utilization of x-rays became more acceptable, the involvement of electricians began to decline. As the hospitals started to be equipped with x-ray apparatus and installations under the care of radiologists and radiographers, the medical men began to accept the eventuality of the new technology. Up to this point, the private experimenters and investigators continued to be the initiators of new ideas for the medical profession in this new field.

== Life and times ==
In 1861, Schmidlin was born in Switzerland. In 1881, the Census of England and Wales records indicate that he was living as a boarder in the James Tomkinson family residence in Manchester, England. His occupation was listed as a mechanic (fitter). He traveled to Australia and settled in New South Wales. In 1895, Schmidlin married Maria E. Tilley, (born in 1868, New South Wales). Schmidlin died in 1939.

== X-ray work in Australia ==
The first announcement of the discovery of x-rays in Australia was covered by the Daily Telegraph in Sydney on 31 January 1896. Frank Smidlin, an electrician at Sydney Hospital, took the first x-ray in Sydney in 1896. On 21 May 1897, the first general meeting of the Medical Section of the Royal Society of New South Wales was held and numerous radiographs of surgical and medical interest taken by Schmidlin were displayed. In 1899, Schmidlin was elected to the Royal Society of New South Wales. In 1900, the business of F. Schmidlin was located at 44 Elizabeth Street, Sydney and advertised in the Australasian Medical Gazette. The advertisement mentioned the availability of all necessary apparatus for x-rays. F. Schmidlin was listed as electrician and importer of electro-medical apparatus. In 1901, Schmidlin was elected to the Rontgen Society.

Schmidlin became an agent for the London electrical firm of Karl Schall from RGS, Reiniger, Gebbert & Schall. Of interest to note, Schall just happened to be Schmidlin's brother-in-law. With the connection to Schall, Schmidlin became an initial importer and supplier of X-ray coils and tubes into Sydney for the medical practitioners. In the early days with this new technological advancement, the supplier of X-ray apparatus became the expert and the demonstrator. Schmidlin operated in the capacity as demonstrator and instructor for several years. He trained the medical men in the electrics of the new techniques. Beginning in June 1896, Schmidlin and his expertise as radiographer with x-ray apparatus were requested by surgeons for locating foreign bodies. His equipment consisted of a 6-inch coil, a 6 cell bichromate battery configuration and Crookes Focus Tube, and on occasion necessitated that a 30-minute exposure be applied. With this apparatus, he produced successful negatives.

In 1906, F. Schmidlin, electrician, business located at 83 Elizabeth Street, Sydney, New South Wales advertised equipment available from his line of goods, that included portable accumulators for x-ray work and x-ray apparatus kept in stock with “a complete X-Ray Apparatus is always in readiness for Screen Examinations or to take Radiographs of Patients”.

== Coverage in the local press ==
In an effort to depict the mindset of the time and place, a few articles are reproduced here. In a typical example of the work that Schmidlin was called upon to perform, the Sydney Morning Herald carried this story on 15 August 1896.

The Rontgen Rays and Surgery.

The bullet in the leg of the man Acheson, who was shot near Tilpa, and is now in the Sydney Hospital, was located by means of the Rontgen rays applied by Mr. Schmidlin. The bullet was found near the bone. Dr. R. Steer Bowker performed an operation yesterday, and was successful in extracting the bullet without difficulty. - Sydney Morning Herald

Another such demonstration of the expertise of Schmidlin and witnessed by prominent medical men of the day, was recorded in the 22 August 1896 issue of The Town and Country Journal.

The Rontgen Rays. Successful Use at Sydney Hospital.
A series of interesting experiments with the Rontgen rays were completed at Sydney Hospital on the afternoon of August 14 by Mr. Schmidlin, electrician of Elizabeth – street. Under a 6 in Rumkorff induction coil and a Crookes focus tube previously exhausted, he photographed, or more properly speaking, shadowgraphed the bullet wound on the inside of the right thigh of Frederick Atcheson, the victim of the Tilpa shooting case. Mr. Schmidlin used extra rapid full plates, and allowed half an hour exposure in each case. The plate, wrapped in specially prepared silk and paper to protect it against the natural light, was placed immediately beneath the patient’s leg on the opposite side to the wound. Then the wound itself was laid bare, and with the patient stretched at full length in bed, and perfectly at ease, the fluorescent rays were flashed intermittently, and a splendid shadowgraph picture was the result. The bones of the leg were clearly defined, and the bullet itself equally so. A second exposure from a slightly different position was afterwards taken with another full plate for the purpose of showing the exact angle of the embedded bullet. Atcheson was placed under chloroform, and Dr. Bowker cut into the wound and removed the bullet with ease. The patient, said the doctors present, is necessarily subject to the usual dangers arising from surgery, but as an operation, success was complete and emphatic. Those who witnessed the removal were Drs. McCormick, Goode, Chisholm, Binnie (medical superintendent of Sydney Hospital) and others, including the resident medical staff of the institution. - The Town and Country Journal.

== Name change ==
On 12 October 1925, Frank Schmidlin published a notice that declared his name to be changed to Frank Smidlin. Frank Smidlin of Anzac-parade, South Kensington near Sydney in New South Wales, medical practitioner, gave notice to abandon the name of Schmidlin.
