= Johannes Schmidlin =

Swiss composer (1722–1772)

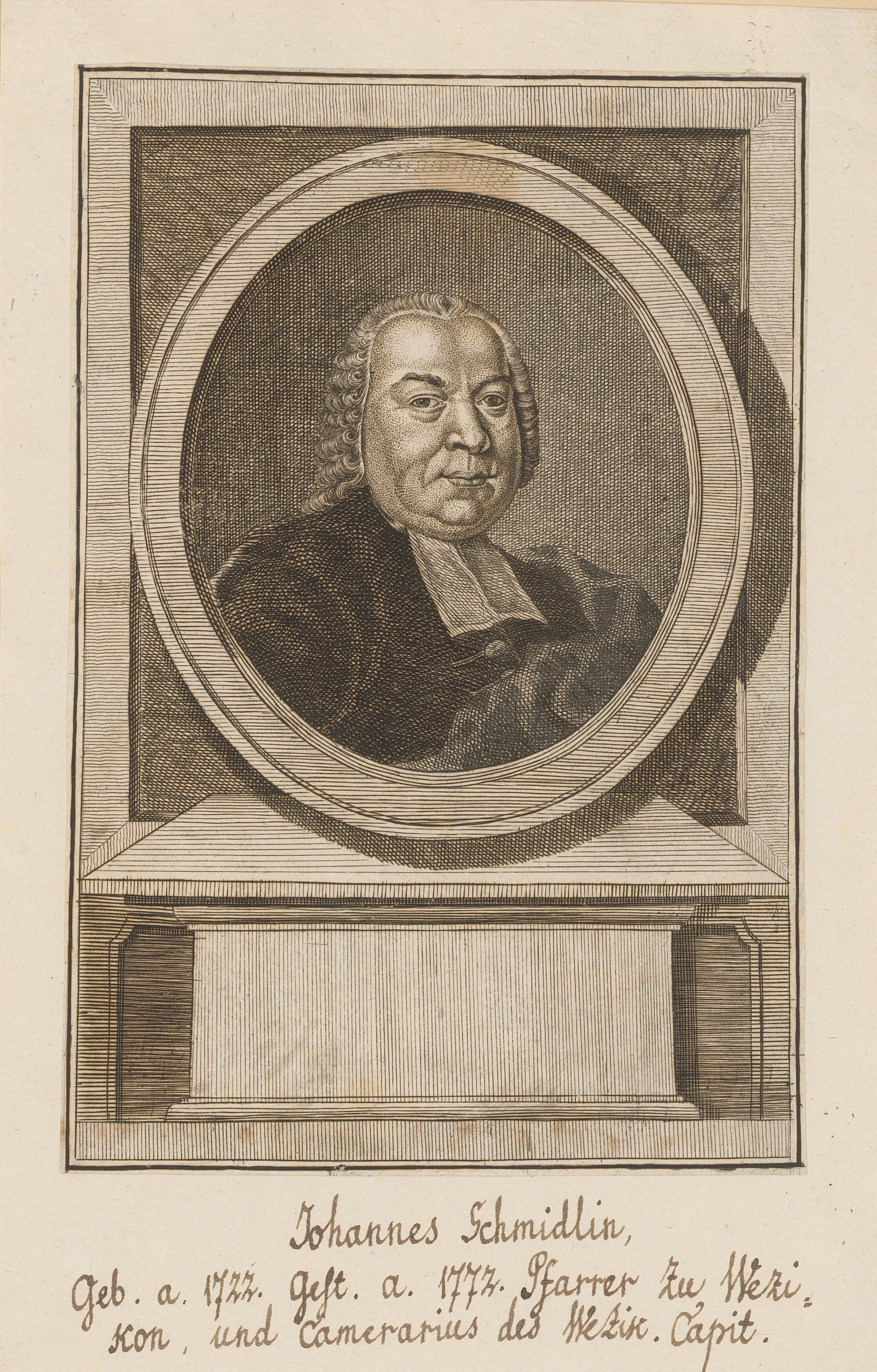
A portrait of Johannes Schmidlin

Johannes Schmidlin (22 May 1722 – 5 November 1772) was a Swiss composer.

He was born in Zürich on 22 May 1722, the son of Margaretha Vogel and a ship captain, Jakob. He studied theology at the Collegium Carolinum and is thought to have received music lessons from Johann Caspar Bachofen. He became a Protestant clergyman in 1743 and was a curate in Dietlikon between 1744 and 1754. He then became a minister in Wetzikon, where he established a choir to encourage psalm singing (1755) and created a Collegium Musicum (1769).

He produced a number of cantatas, odes and religious songs, which were at the time performed at collegia and known in the wider population. Their popularity continued for decades. He also contributed to the patriotic Schweizerlieder, which were solo songs, in 1769 (these were based upon Johann Kaspar Lavater's verses from 1767).

He died in Wetzikon on 5 November 1772. His choir would survive until 1825. Three of his songs remain the hymnbook of the Swiss Reformed Church.
