= Dictum (music) =

Type of church cantata libretto

In music, a dictum (Latin 'something that has been said'; plural dicta) is a type of libretto for a church cantata consisting of quotes from sacred scripture.

When Erdmann Neumeister introduced the cantata concept for sacred music in early 18th-century Protestant Germany, his librettos originally had only two types of movements: recitatives and arias. The text of these movements was the poetic (i.e., in verse) elaboration of some religious thought. In Neumeister's original concept both of these types of movements were to be sung by vocal soloists. Soon thereafter, for instance in a set of cantata librettos published in Meiningen in 1704, two other types of movements, both deriving from earlier genres such as Chorale concerto and Geistliches Konzert, were combined in the cantata librettos: chorales and dicta. The chorale movements typically quoted from Lutheran hymns. For these movements the composer was expected to base his setting on the tune of the hymn. The dicta were prose quotes from sacred scripture, i.e., for German church cantatas and motets of the Reformation era, quotes from the Luther Bible. In this context a dictum can also be referred to with the German word Spruch (lit. '"saying"'). Libretto authors such as Neumeister and Benjamin Schmolck began to include dicta and chorales in their later cantata cycles.

For the musical setting of dicta there was no fixed format:

- Johann Ludwig Bach set dicta for instance as solo aria (e.g. the opening movements of both parts of Ja, mir hast du Arbeit gemacht, JLB 5), as vocal duet (e.g. 4th movement of Die mit Tränen säen, JLB 8) and as chorus (e.g. 1st movement of JLB 8)
- Johann Sebastian Bach set dicta for instance as recitative (e.g. 4th movement of Gott fähret auf mit Jauchzen, BWV 43), as solo aria (e.g. 1st movement of Siehe, ich will viel Fischer aussenden, BWV 88), as Vox Christi solo for bass (e.g. 4th movement of Brich dem Hungrigen dein Brot, BWV 39), as arioso for Evangelist and Vox Christi (e.g. 4th movement of BWV 88), as duet (e.g. 5th movement of Meine Seel erhebt den Herren, BWV 10) and as chorus (e.g. first movements of BWV 10, 39, and 43, and even movements of the motet Jesu, meine Freude, BWV 227)

== Sources ==
- Blanken, Christine (2015). "A Cantata-Text Cycle of 1728 from Nuremberg: a Preliminary Report on a Discovery relating to J. S. Bach's so-called 'Third Annual Cantata Cycle'" (PDF). Understanding Bach. 10. Bach Network UK: 9–30. ISSN 1750-3078.
- Glöckner, Andreas (2009). "Ein weiterer Kantatenjahrgang Gottfried Heinrich Stölzels in Bachs Aufführungsrepertoire?" [Is there another cantata cycle by Gottfried Heinrich Stölzel that belonged to Bach’s performance repertoire?]. In Wollny, Peter (ed.). Bach-Jahrbuch 2009 [Bach Yearbook 2009]. Bach-Jahrbuch (in German). Vol. 95. Neue Bachgesellschaft. Leipzig: Evangelische Verlagsanstalt. pp. 95–115. doi:10.13141/bjb.v2009. ISBN 978-3-374-02749-1. ISSN 0084-7682.
- Melamed, Daniel R. (1995). J.S. Bach and the German Motet. Cambridge University Press. ISBN 0-52-141864-X.
