= Johann Georg Ebeling =

German composer

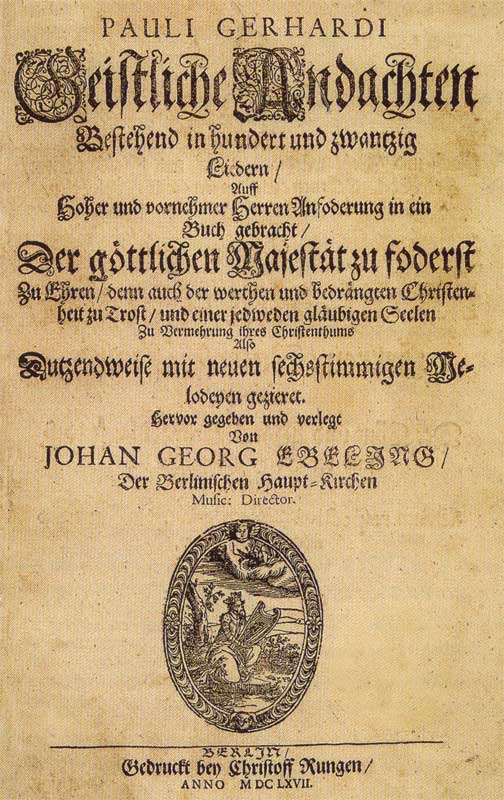
Title page of the 1667 hymn collection Pauli Gerhardi Geistliche Andachten

Johann Georg Ebeling (8 July 1637 – 4 December 1676) was a German composer who was born in Lüneburg and died in Stettin. Ebeling is known as editor and composer of hymns by Paul Gerhardt. He published in 1667 120 songs by Gerhardt, adding new melodies to many, writing the first melody for 26 of them, including "Die güldne Sonne voll Freud und Wonne" and "Du meine Seele singe". Several of his cantatas are extant.

== Selected works ==
- Pauli Gerhardi Geistliche Andachten. 10 booklets, Frankfurt (Oder) and Berlin 1666/1667.
- Pauli Gerhardi Geistliche Andachten Bestehend in hundert und zwanzig Liedern. Stettin 1670.
- Archaeologiae Orphicae

== Literature ==
- Rochus von Liliencron (1877). "Ebeling, Johann Georg" . Allgemeine Deutsche Biographie (in German). Vol. 5. Leipzig: Duncker & Humblot. p. 525.
- Christiane Engelbrecht (1959). "Ebeling, Johann Georg". Neue Deutsche Biographie (in German). Vol. 4. Berlin: Duncker & Humblot. pp. 222–222. (full text online).
- Friedrich Wilhelm Bautz (1975). "Ebeling, Johann Georg". In Bautz, Friedrich Wilhelm (ed.). Biographisch-Bibliographisches Kirchenlexikon (BBKL) (in German). Vol. 1. Hamm: Bautz. col. 1441. ISBN 3-88309-013-1.
- Elke Liebig: Johann Georg Ebeling und Paul Gerhardt: Liedkomposition im Konfessionskonflikt. Die Geistlichen Andachten Berlin 1666/67. Lang, Frankfurt am Main 2008, ISBN 3-631-57469-X.
