= Friedrich Eickhoff =

German teacher and organist

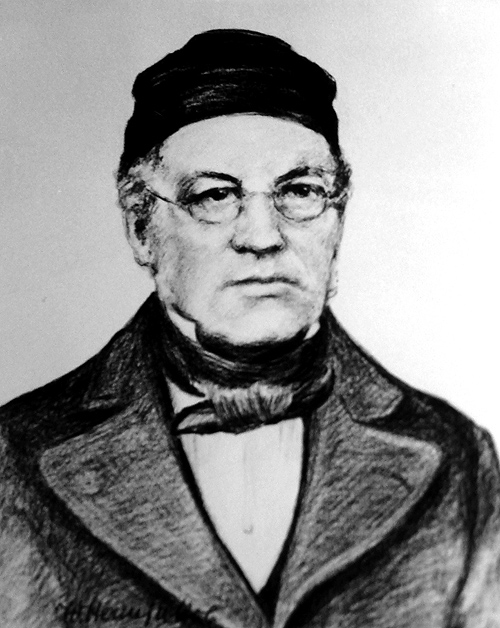
Friedrich Hermann Eickhoff

Friedrich Hermann Eickhoff, erroneously also Friedrich Heinrich Eickhoff (1807 - 1886) was a German teacher, organist and song editor. Until today he is known through the Lieder Geh aus, mein Herz, und suche Freud and Ihr Kinderlein, kommet, which he created by combining sacred texts (by Paul Gerhardt and Christoph von Schmid) with spring melodies by August Harder and Johann Abraham Peter Schulz.

== Life ==
Born in Soest, Eickhoff received his training at the Lehrerseminar in Soest. In 1829 he came to Gütersloh as a teacher. There he taught at the protestant girls' elementary school in the Kirchstraße; later he became their rector. In this capacity, he was in charge of the school's move to the new school building in the "Kökerstraße" in 1859 and the merging of the three Protestant elementary schools into the "Bürgerschule" in 1868.

Beside his pedagogical activity Eickhoff was organist of the evangelic congregation at the Apostelkirche, where two years before him Johann Heinrich Volkening had come as a pastor (until 1838). Through Volkening, Gütersloh became a center of the Minden-Ravensberg Lutheran revivalist movement of the 19th century: Baptists, Methodists, sanctification movement, neo-pietism revivalism.

Eickhoff's concern for folk Christian songs had grown out of his teaching profession as well as his organist service. By singing atmospheric texts to catchy melodies, images and message of the gospel were to be impressed upon children and families.

In 1835 Carl Bertelsmann founded his publishing house at the church square in Gütersloh. One of the first sales successes was the Christian song collection Theomele [gr.-lat. "Gotteslieder"], published by Eickhoff with the songs he collected or created by combination. Around this time Eickhoff married Bertelsmann's daughter Anna Friederike. The couple had four children, three of whom became teachers like Eickhoff.

Eickhoff's songs experienced their real breakthrough through Johann Heinrich Volkening's songbook Kleine Missionsharfe. It was published by Bertelsmann in 1852 and had 82 editions with more than two million copies.

In 1873, Eickhoff co-founded the Historical Society in Gütersloh, the forerunner of today's Gütersloh Heimatverein. On the 50th anniversary of Eickhoff's death in 1936, Eickhoffstrasse in Gütersloh was given its name, although it was not named after Friedrich Hermann Eickhoff, but after his sons Prof. Hermann Eickhoff (1853-1934) and Prof. Paul Eickhoff (1850-1931). Both published numerous works on local history.
