= Charles Bere =

English cricketer and clergyman (1829–1889)

Personal information
- Full name: Charles Sandford Bere
- Born: 25 January 1829; Marylebone, Middlesex, England
- Died: 29 May 1889 (aged 60); Morebath, Devon, England
- Batting: Unknown
- Bowling: Unknown
- Relatives: Arthur Hook (nephew)

Domestic team information
- Years: Team
- 1851: Oxford University

Career statistics
Competition	First-class
Matches	2
Runs scored	43
Batting average	14.33
100s/50s	–/–
Top score	23
Balls bowled	?
Wickets	8
Bowling average	?
5 wickets in innings	1
10 wickets in match	–
Best bowling	6/?
Catches/stumpings	1/–
- Source: Cricinfo, 9 January 2020

Charles Sandford Bere (25 January 1829 – 29 May 1889) was an English first-class cricketer and clergyman.

The son of Montague Baker-Bere and Wilhelmina Jemima Sandford, he was born in January 1829 at Marylebone. He was educated at Rugby School, before going up to Christ Church, Oxford in 1848. He graduated B.A. in 1852, M.A. in 1868

While studying at Oxford, Bere made two appearances in first-class cricket for Oxford University in 1851, playing against the Marylebone Cricket Club and Cambridge University. He scored 43 runs in his two matches, with a high score of 23. He also took 8 wickets, including six wickets in an innings against the MCC.

After graduating from Oxford, he took holy orders in the Anglican Church, with his first ecclesiastical posting as rector of Uplowman coming in 1858. He later served as the vicar of Morebath in 1885, where he died four years later in May 1889. He was survived by his wife, Frances Lydia Dyke Troyte, with whom he had two children. His nephew, Arthur Hook, also played first-class cricket.

While at Uplowman, he met Jane Montgomery Campbell. She translated some German hymns for Bere's book: A Garland of Songs in 1862, and later in his Children's Chorale Book (1869). One of her translations contained the text written by Matthias Claudius: Wir pflügen und wir streuen, which became a classic as the quintessential harvest hymn: We Plough the Fields and Scatter.
