= Jane Montgomery Campbell =

English musician and poet (1817–1878)

Jane Montgomery Campbell (1817 – 15 November 1878) was a British musician and poet.

== Biography ==
She was born in Paddington, the daughter of A. Montgomery Campbell (perpetual curate of St James's Church, Paddington, London; rector of Little Steeping, Lincolnshire; and a scion of the Campbells of Askomel). After her early years in London, where she taught singing in her father’s parish school in Paddington, she moved to Bovey Tracey near Newton Abbot, and remained there until her death from a tragic carriage accident on Dartmoor.

As well as a musical enthusiast, she was a gifted linguist and German scholar. She published A Handbook for Singers, which contained musical exercises based on her teaching experience. Through Charles Bere, rector of Uplowman, Tiverton, Devon, her translations of German hymns appeared in his book: A Garland of Songs in 1862, and later in his Children's Chorale Book (1869). One of her translations contained the text written by Matthias Claudius: Wir pflügen und wir streuen, which became a classic as the quintessential harvest hymn: We Plough the Fields and Scatter. She did not make a strict translation from the original German but ensured retention of the hymn's original focus of giving thanks to God for the harvest. The melody was composed by Johann Abraham Peter Schulz. She also made an early translation of Silent Night.
