= Ihr Kinderlein, kommet =

German Christmas carol

- German Christmas carol
- English: Oh, come, little children
- Written: 1811
- Text: Christoph von Schmid
- Language: German
- Melody: Johann Abraham Peter Schulz (1794); Franz Xaver Luft (1837)
- Ihr Kinderlein kommet Performed in 2008, instrumental

"Ihr Kinderlein, kommet" ("Oh, come, little children") is a German Christmas carol.

The lyrics were written by Catholic priest and writer Christoph von Schmid in 1798. His poem "Die Kinder bei der Krippe" (The children at the manger) had originally eight verses and was first published in 1811. Schmid then included it in his 1818 collection Blüten dem blühenden Alter gewidmet (Flowers dedicated to the flowering age). Together with other poems from this collection, it was then set to music by Franz Xaver Luft in 1837.

The music to the poem as it is known today was written by the composer Johann Abraham Peter Schulz in 1794 as a secular song named "Wie reizend, wie wonnig" (How charming, how pleasant). Around 1832, this melody was first published with Schmid's poem in a collection Sechzig deutsche Lieder für dreißig Pfennig (Sixty German songs for thirty pennies) by Friedrich Eickhoff (1807–1886). This collection was later printed in large numbers by the just founded (1835) C. Bertelsmann Verlag.

== Melody and lyrics ==
Ihr Kinderlein, kommet, o kommet doch all!
Zur Krippe her kommet in Bethlehems Stall
und seht, was in dieser hochheiligen Nacht
der Vater im Himmel für Freude uns macht!

O seht in der Krippe im nächtlichen Stall,
seht hier bei des Lichtleins hell glänzendem Strahl
den reinliche Windeln, das himmlische Kind,
viel schöner und holder als Engel es sind!

Da liegt es, das Kindlein, auf Heu und auf Stroh,
Maria und Josef betrachten es froh.
Die redlichen Hirten knien betend davor,
hoch oben schwebt jubelnd der Engelein Chor.

O beugt wie die Hirten anbetend die Knie,
erhebet die Hände und danket wie sie!
Stimmt freudig, ihr Kinder, wer wollt sich nicht freun,
stimmt freudig zum Jubel der Engel mit ein!

O betet: Du liebes, du göttliches Kind,
was leidest du alles für unsere Sünd!
Ach hier in der Krippe schon Armut und Not,
am Kreuze dort gar noch den bitteren Tod.

So nimm unsre Herzen zum Opfer denn hin;
wir geben sie gerne mit fröhlichem Sinn.
Ach mache sie heilig und selig wie Deins
und mach sie auf ewig mit Deinem nur eins.

Oh, come, little children, oh, come, one and all,
To Bethlehem's stable, in Bethlehem's stall.
And see with rejoicing this glorious sight,
Our Father in heaven has sent us this night.

Oh, see in the manger, in hallowèd light
A star throws its beam on this holiest sight.
In clean swaddling clothes lies the heavenly Child,
More lovely than angels, this Baby so mild.

Oh, there lies the Christ Child, on hay and on straw;
The shepherds are kneeling before Him with awe.
And Mary and Joseph smile on Him with love,
While angels are singing sweet songs from above.

Translated by Melanie Schulte (1885–1922)

Other English translations exists.

== See also ==
- List of Christmas carols
