= Geh aus, mein Herz, und suche Freud =

Summer hymn

- Hymn
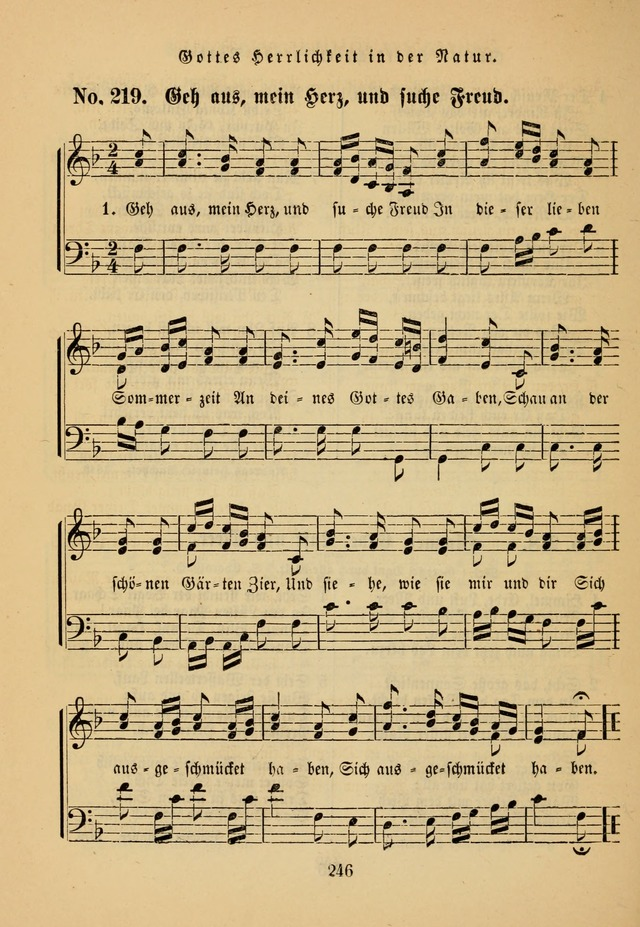
- A three-part setting in a hymnal of the Lutheran congregations in Philadelphia, 1876
- English: Go Forth, My Heart, and Seek Delight
- Text: by Paul Gerhardt
- Language: German
- Melody: Johann Georg Ebeling (1667); August Harder (1800s)
- Published: 1653 (without melody)

"Geh aus, mein Herz, und suche Freud" ("Go forth, my heart, and seek delight") is a summer hymn with a text in German by the theologian Paul Gerhardt, written in 1653. It was first published in the same year in the fifth edition of Johann Crüger's hymnal, Praxis pietatis melica. The hymn was sung to several melodies, with the most popular one composed by August Harder. Later, it became a Volkslied in an abridged version.

The song was rendered into several English-language versions. A Swedish version became a popular graduation song.

== History ==
Gerhardt wrote the poem in 1653, five years after the end of the Thirty Years' War. The original text consists of fifteen stanzas, each comprising six lines. It commences with admiration for God's creation, as observed in gardens and nature. The second part, starting from stanza 9, depicts paradise as an even grander garden.

The final two stanzas contain prayers: "... dass ich dir werd ein guter Baum" ("... that I become a good tree for you"); "Verleihe, daß zu deinem Ruhm ich deines Gartens schöne Blum und Pflanze möge bleiben" ("Grant that I may remain a beautiful flower and plant of your garden"); and "laß mich bis zur letzten Reis an Leib und Seele grünen" ("let me be green in body and soul until the final journey").

The song was first published the same year (1653) in the fifth edition of Johann Crüger's hymnal Praxis pietatis melica.

Many publications contain only stanzas 1 to 3 and 8. In the abridged version, the hymn became a Volkslied.

== Translations ==
Among several other versions, Catherine Winkworth translated it as "Go forth, my heart, and seek delight". This hymn has not become part of hymnals, possibly because it is not focused on Jesus.

In Sweden, as "I denna ljuva sommartid", it has become a popular graduation song together with "Den blomstertid nu kommer".

== Text ==
1. Geh aus, mein Herz, und suche Freud
in dieser lieben Sommerzeit
an deines Gottes Gaben;
Schau an der schönen Gärten Zier,
und siehe, wie sie mir und dir
sich ausgeschmücket haben.

2. Die Bäume stehen voller Laub,
das Erdreich decket seinen Staub
mit einem grünen Kleide;
Narzissus und die Tulipan,
die ziehen sich viel schöner an
als Salomonis Seide.

3. Die Lerche schwingt sich in die Luft,
das Täublein fliegt aus seiner Kluft
und macht sich in die Wälder;
die hochbegabte Nachtigall
ergötzt und füllt mit ihrem Schall
Berg, Hügel, Tal und Felder.

4. Die Glucke führt ihr Völklein aus,
der Storch baut und bewohnt sein Haus,
das Schwälblein speist die Jungen,
der schnelle Hirsch, das leichte Reh
ist froh und kommt aus seiner Höh
ins tiefe Gras gesprungen.

5. Die Bächlein rauschen in dem Sand
und malen sich an ihrem Rand
mit schattenreichen Myrten;
die Wiesen liegen hart dabei
und klingen ganz vom Lustgeschrei
der Schaf und ihrer Hirten.

6. Die unverdrossne Bienenschar
fliegt hin und her, sucht hier und da
ihr edle Honigspeise;
des süßen Weinstocks starker Saft
bringt täglich neue Stärk und Kraft
in seinem schwachen Reise.

7. Der Weizen wächset mit Gewalt;
darüber jauchzet jung und alt
und rühmt die große Güte
des, der so überfließend labt,
und mit so manchem Gut begabt
das menschliche Gemüte.

8. Ich selber kann und mag nicht ruhn,
des großen Gottes großes Tun
erweckt mir alle Sinnen;
ich singe mit, wenn alles singt,
und lasse, was dem Höchsten klingt,
aus meinem Herzen rinnen.

9. Ach, denk ich, bist du hier so schön
und läßt du's uns so lieblich gehn
auf dieser armen Erden;
was will doch wohl nach dieser Welt
dort in dem reichen Himmelszelt
und güldnen Schlosse werden!

10. Welch hohe Lust, welch heller Schein
wird wohl in Christi Garten sein!
Wie muß es da wohl klingen,
da so viel tausend Seraphim
mit unverdroßnem Mund und Stimm
ihr Halleluja singen?

11. O wär ich da! O stünd ich schon,
ach süßer Gott, vor deinem Thron
und trüge meine Palmen:
So wollt ich nach der Engel Weis
erhöhen deines Namens Preis
mit tausend schönen Psalmen.

12. Doch gleichwohl will ich, weil ich noch
hier trage dieses Leibes Joch,
auch nicht gar stille schweigen;
mein Herze soll sich fort und fort
an diesem und an allem Ort
zu deinem Lobe neigen.

13. Hilf mir und segne meinen Geist
mit Segen, der vom Himmel fleußt,
daß ich dir stetig blühe;
gib, daß der Sommer deiner Gnad
in meiner Seele früh und spat
viel Glaubensfrüchte ziehe.

14. Mach in mir deinem Geiste Raum,
daß ich dir werd ein guter Baum,
und laß mich Wurzel treiben.
Verleihe, daß zu deinem Ruhm
ich deines Gartens schöne Blum
und Pflanze möge bleiben.

15. Erwähle mich zum Paradeis
und laß mich bis zur letzten Reis
an Leib und Seele grünen,
so will ich dir und deiner Ehr
allein und sonsten keinem mehr
hier und dort ewig dienen.

Go forth, my heart, and seek delight
In all the gifts of God's great might,
These pleasant summer hours:
Look how the plains for thee and me
Have decked themselves most fair to see,
All bright and sweet with flowers.

The trees stand thick and dark with leaves,
And earth o'er all here dust now weaves
A robe of living green;
Nor silks of Solomon compare
With glories that the tulips wear,
Or lilies' spotless sheen.

The lark soars singing into space,
The dove forsakes her hiding-place,
And coos the woods among;
The richly-gifted nightingale,
Pours forth her voice o'er hill and dale,
And floods the fields with song.

Here with her brood the hen doth walk,
There builds and guards his nest the stork,
The fleet-winged swallows pass;
The swift stag leaves his rocky home,
And down the light deer bounding come
To taste the long rich grass.

The brooks rush gurgling through the sand,
And from the trees on either hand,
Cool shadows o'er them fall;
The meadows at their side are glad
With herds; and hark! the shepherd lad
Sends forth his mirthful call.

And humming, hovering to and fro,
The never-wearied swarms no go
To seek their honey'd food;
And through the vine's yet feeble shoots
Stream daily upwards from her roots
New strength and juices good.

The corn springs up, a wealth untold,
A sight to gladden young and old,
Who now their voices lift
To Him who gives such plenteous store,
And makes the cup of life run o'er
With many a noble gift.

Thy mighty working, mighty God,
Wakes all my powers; I look abroad
And can no longer rest:
I too must sing when all things sing,
And from my heart the praises ring
The Highest loveth best.

I think, Art Thou so good to us,
And scatterest joy and beauty thus
O'er this poor earth of ours;
What nobler glories shall be given
Hereafter in Thy shining heaven,
Set round with golden towers!

What thrilling joy when on our sight
Christ's garden beams in cloudless light,
Where all the air is sweet,
Still laden with the unwearied hymn
From all the thousand seraphim
Who God's high praise repeat!

Oh were I there! Oh that I now,
Dear God, before Thy throne could bow,
And bear my heavenly palm!
Then like the angels would I raise
My voice, and sing Thy endless praise
In many a sweet-toned psalm.

Nor can I now, O God, forbear,
Though still this mortal yoke I wear,
To utter oft Thy name;
But still my heart is bent to speak
Thy praises; still, though poor and weak,
Would I Thy love proclaim.

But help me; let Thy heavenly showers
Revive and bless my fainting powers,
And let me thrive and grow
Beneath the summer of Thy grace,
And fruits of faith bud forth apace
While yet I dwell below.

And set me, Lord, in Paradise
When I have bloomed beneath these skies
Till my last leaf is flown;
Thus let me serve Thee here in time,
And after, in that happier clime,
And Thee, my God, alone!

== Melodies and other music ==
Harder's melody, MIDI rendition

When the song was first published, it was sung to the melody of "Den Herrn meine Seel erhebt". In 1667 Johann Georg Ebeling composed a new melody, published in the collection Pauli Gerhardi Geistliche Andachten (Sacred Contemplations of Paul Gerhardt). In this collection, which was intended for church and home, the melody appeared in the soprano of a four-part setting with two instrumental parts ad libitum.

The most popular melody was composed by August Harder. It was originally intended for the poem "Die Luft ist blau, das Tal ist grün" (The air is blue, the valley is green) by Ludwig Hölty. The organist Friedrich Eickhoff first applied it to Gerhardt's song in 1836. The hymn appears with this melody in the current Protestant hymnal, Evangelisches Gesangbuch, as number 503.

In the 1920s Walther Hensel wrote yet another melody which appeared in the then popular collection Bruder Singer. Rudolf Mauersberger composed the sacred summer music (Geistliche Sommermusik) Geh aus, mein Herz, und suche Freud (RMWV 11).
