= We Plough the Fields and Scatter =

Christian hymn

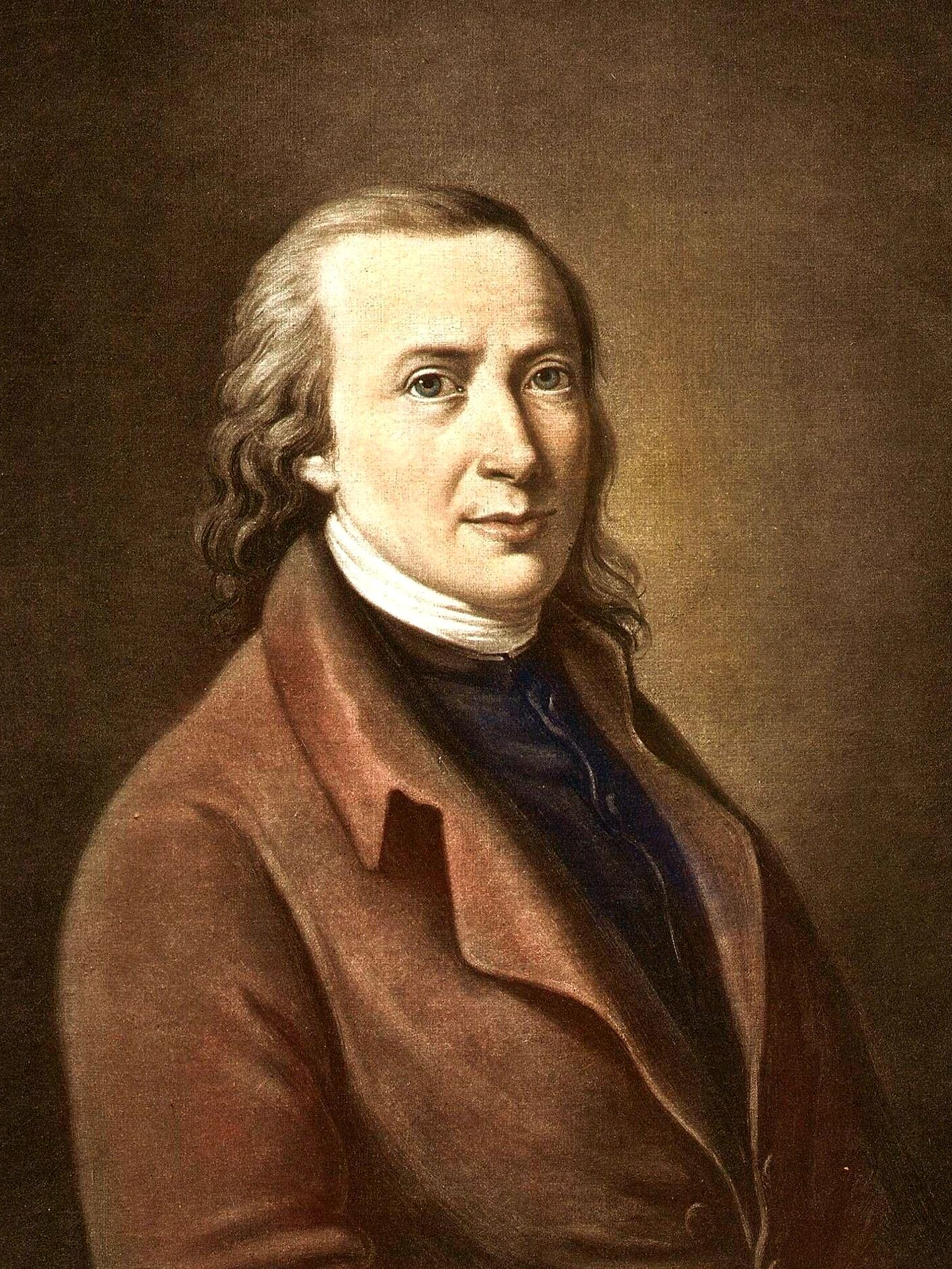
- Matthias Claudius
- Native name: "Wir pflügen und wir streuen"
- Genre: Hymn
- Written: 1782
- Text: Matthias Claudius
- Based on: Matthew 13:4-9
- Meter: 7.6.7.6 D with refrain
- Melody: "Wir Pflügen" by Johann A. P. Schulz

"We Plough the Fields and Scatter" is a hymn of German origin, commonly associated with harvest festivals. Written by poet Matthias Claudius, "Wir pflügen und wir streuen" was published in 1782 and set to music in 1800 attributed to Johann A. P. Schulz. It was translated into English by Jane Montgomery Campbell in 1861, and it has since become a staple of Harvest Festival services, particularly in the United Kingdom, where it among the most performed of hymns.

The hymn appears in a shortened form in the musical Godspell, as the song, "All Good Gifts".

== History ==
=== Origins ===
In 1777, Matthias Claudius had become ill and returned to Christianity after leaving it in his 20s. During his illness he wrote a number of poems. In 1782, a friend invited him over for dinner and asked him to bring one of the Christian poems he had written. Claudius wrote "Wir pflügen und wir streuen" based on Psalm 144 for this occasion with 17 verses. The poem was then published in "Asinus omnia sua secum portans" as a peasant's song. From there, it was published across Germany in number of hymnbooks. The majority of these cut down on the original 17 verses with the publishers often deciding to start with the 3rd verse which started with "Wir pflügen und wir streuen" (English: We Plough The Fields And Scatter).

=== English translation ===
In 1862 in England, Jane Montgomery Campbell, who was proficient in the German language, started to translate a number of German hymns into English. She translated "Wir pflügen und wir streuen" into English as "We Plough the Fields and Scatter"; however, she did not make a strict translation from the original German but ensured retention of the hymn's original focus of giving thanks to God for the harvest. She taught the hymn to the children at the Church of England parish school in London where her father was the rector. The hymn was later published in Charles Bere's Garland of Songs and Children's Chorale Book.

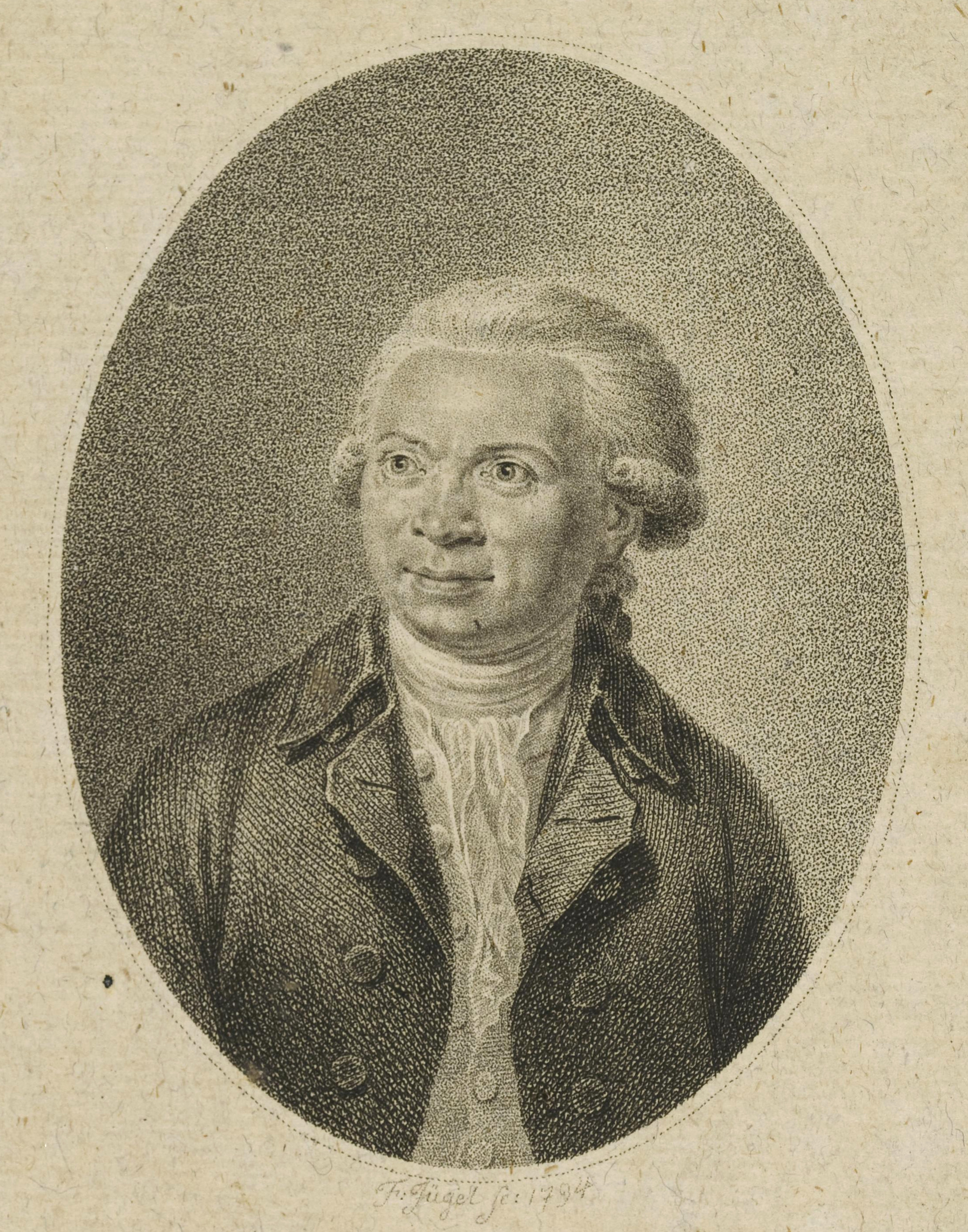
Johann Abraham Peter Schulz

== Usage ==
The hymn is predominantly used as a hymn to give thanks to God for the harvest and it has also been used in the United States as a hymn for Thanksgiving. The hymn has also been referenced in popular culture. In 1969, future Poet Laureate of the United Kingdom, John Betjeman parodied the hymn as "We spray the fields and scatter/the poison on the land" published in Harvest Times as a protest against modern farming methods and new planning legislation.

"We Plough the Fields and Scatter" has also had a number of unofficial updated verses for it. An anonymous revised first verse, which alluded to Betjeman's parody, was published titled "We Plough the Fields with Tractors". This verse, however, has been criticised as banal as it would not reference the history of the harvest.

== Lyrics ==
Lyrics as published in 1861 in A Garland of Songs:

We plough the fields, and scatter the good seed on the land;
But it is fed and watered by God's almighty hand:
He sends the snow in winter, the warmth to swell the grain,
The breezes and the sunshine, and soft refreshing rain.

Chorus

All good gifts around us
Are sent from heaven above,
Then thank the Lord, O thank the Lord
For all His love.

He only is the maker of all things near and far;
He paints the wayside flower, He lights the evening star;
The winds and waves obey Him, by Him the birds are fed;
Much more to us, His children, He gives our daily bread.

Chorus

We thank Thee, then, O Father, for all things bright and good,
The seed time and the harvest, our life, our health, and food;
No gifts have we to offer, for all Thy love imparts,
But that which Thou desirest, our humble, thankful hearts.

Chorus

Verse 3 was revised to make it better suited to the harvest in Hymns Ancient and Modern, 1868 Appendix:

We thank Thee, then, O Father, for all things bright and good,
The seed time and the harvest, our life, our health, and food;
Accept the gifts we offer, for all Thy love imparts,
But what Thou most desirest, our humble, thankful hearts.

The hymn references Acts 14:17 (verse 1), James 1:17 (chorus), Psalms 65:7 and Matthew 6:26 (verse 2, line 3).
