= Walther Hensel =

German musicologist and music educator (1887–1956)

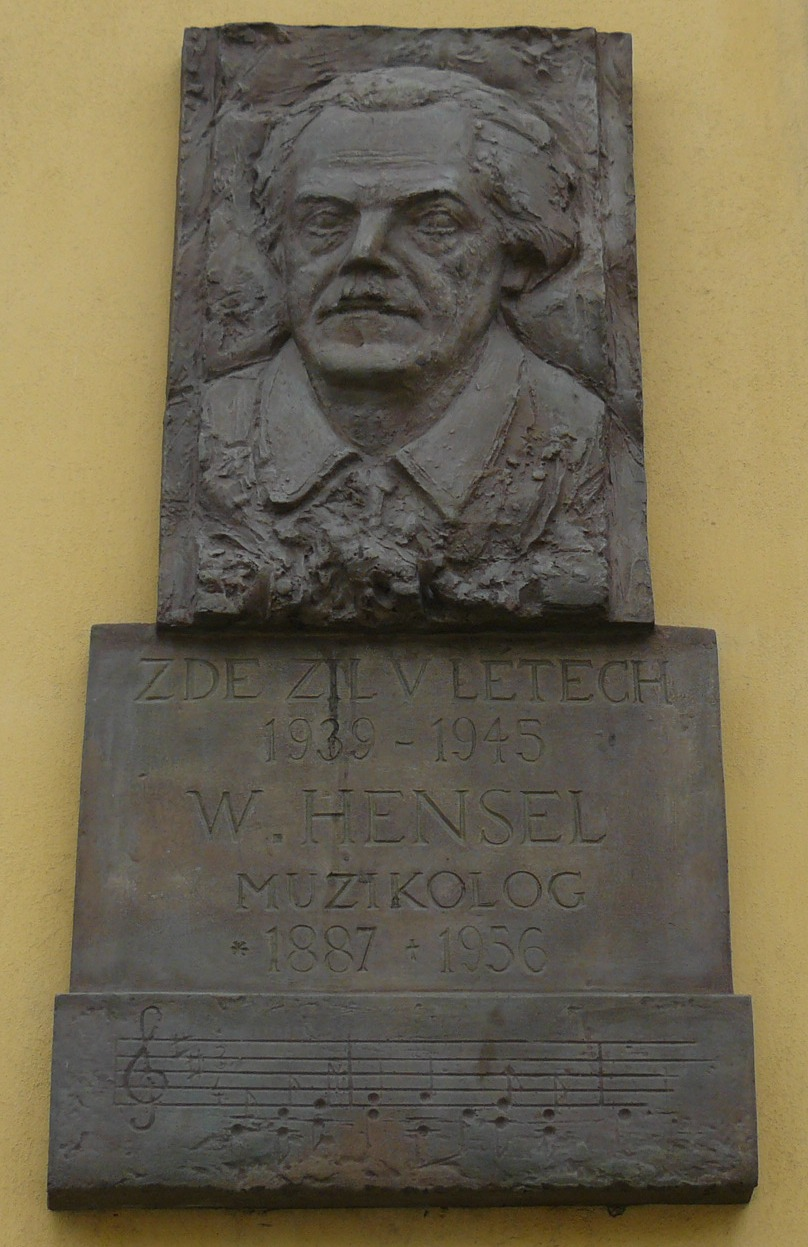
Commemorative plaque in Teplitz, Bohemia.

Walther Hensel (born Julius Janiczek; 8 September 1887 − 5 September 1956) was a German musicologist, music educator, who dedicated himself above all to the research and cultivation of folk songs.

== Life and achievements ==
Born in Moravská Třebová, Austria-Hungary, Hensel studied the German language as well as literature and musicology in Vienna, Freiburg/Switzerland and Prague and initially worked as a teacher at the Prague Commercial Academy. In 1924, he founded the Finkensteiner Bund out of the Jugendmusikbewegung. From 1925 to 1927 he directed the youth music school Dortmund, from 1930 he taught at the Stuttgart Volkshochschule. Besides he conducted choirs. In 1938 he took the "Anschluss des Sudetenlandes"- the choice of words of the Walther-Hensel-Society in Winnenden, Swabia, as an occasion to return to his homeland. He settled with his second wife Paula in Teplitz. In 1941 the Faculty of Philosophy of the German University in Prague awarded him the Joseph-Freiherr-von-Eichendorff-Preis. At the same time he received a state commission to research German and Slavic folk songs in the Bohemian-Moravian region. According to the website mentioned above, Hensel's work "under the Hitler regime... was complicated by many restrictions. The battle and stamp songs of the SA and the Hitler Youth are anathema to him, they are the opposite of what he aims for with the inner renewal of the people through the song. The statement that the Horst-Wessel-Lied is musically worthless bears witness to his courage." From 1946 to 1950 Hensel worked as a scientific advisor at the Municipal Library in Munich. Shortly before his death in Munich at the age of 68, he was honoured with the Sudetendeutscher Kulturpreis.

Hensel counted among Fritz Jöde and Hans Breuer (editor of the Zupfgeigenhansl) to the leading figures of the youth music movement. He also wrote numerous arrangements or settings of folk songs, including a setting of the poem Geh aus, mein Herz, und suche Freud by Paul Gerhardt. Hensel was the first author published by the Bärenreiter-Verlag. In Göppingen is a primary and secondary school named after Walther Hensel, and in his native town a German-Czech meeting centre bears his name.

== Work ==
- Lied und Volk. Eine Streitschrift wider das falsche deutsche Lied. 1921
- Im Zeichen des Volksliedes. 1922
- Wach auf. Festliche Weisen. 1924
- Lobsinget. Geistliche Lieder. 1926
- Finkensteiner Liederbuch. 1926
- Der singende Quell. 1929
- Das aufrecht Fähnlein. Liederbuch, 1923
- Spinnerin Lobunddank. Märchenliederbuch, 1932
- Lönslieder. 1934
- Musikalische Grundlehre. Ein Wegweiser für Laien. 1936
- Auf den Spuren des Volksliedes. 1944
