= Henry Montgomery Campbell =

British bishop (1887–1970)

The Right Reverend and Right Honourable Henry Montgomery Campbell KCVO MC PC
- Bishop of London
- Montgomery Campbell in 1956
- Church: Church of England
- Province: Canterbury
- Diocese: London
- In office: 1956–1961
- Predecessor: William Wand
- Successor: Robert Stopford
- Previous posts: Bishop of Guildford; 1949–1956; Bishop of Kensington; 1942–1949; Bishop of Willesden; 1940–1942

Orders
- Ordination: 1910 (deacon); 1911 (priest) by Edward Talbot, Bishop of Winchester (priest)
- Consecration: 1940 by archbishop Cosmo Lang

Personal details
- Born: Henry Colville Montgomery Campbell; 11 October 1887
- Died: 26 December 1970 (aged 83) Westminster Hospital
- Buried: Wivelsfield, Sussex
- Denomination: Anglican
- Parents: Sydney Montgomery Campbell
- Spouse: Joyce Mary Thicknesse (m. 1916)
- Children: 5
- Education: Malvern College
- Alma mater: Brasenose College, Oxford

Henry Colville Montgomery Campbell KCVO MC PC (11 October 1887 – 26 December 1970) was a Church of England bishop. He was ordained in 1910 and served as vicar or rector in a number of London parishes before being consecrated as a bishop in 1940, holding, successively, the suffragan bishoprics of Willesden and Kensington and the diocesan bishoprics of Guildford and London until his retirement in 1961.

== Early life and ordained ministry ==
Montgomery Campbell (Note: Although some sources treat "Montgomery" as a given name, it is part of a double-barrelled surname. It is so treated by Montgomery Campbell's family in the notice of his death in The Times. The list of his family members published in The Times after his memorial service names his son as Hugh Montgomery Campbell, his unmarried daughter as Jane Montgomery Campbell, and his granddaughter as Elisabeth Montgomery Campbell. Other family members listed were Colonel A. Montgomery Campbell and Miss A. Montgomery Campbell. The family were nonetheless scions of the Campbells of Askomel.) was the son of Sydney Montgomery Campbell, who was ordained as an Anglican priest in 1885 and became vicar of St John's, Hammersmith, and later of Midhurst and Banstead. The son was educated at Malvern College and Brasenose College, Oxford. After studying at Wells Theological College he was made deacon in December 1910 and ordained priest by Edward Talbot, Bishop of Winchester, at Holy Trinity Church, Guildford, on St Thomas's Day 1911 (21 December). His first appointment was a curacy at Alverstoke. In 1916 he married Joyce Mary, daughter of Norman Thicknesse, rector of St George's Hanover Square. After distinguished wartime service in which he received the Military Cross for bravery at Gallipoli, he served as vicar of West Hackney (1919–26) and Hornsey (1926–33). In the latter post he ran a centre for the unemployed in a building made available to him by the government. From 1929 to 1933 he also held the post of Rural Dean of Hornsey. In 1933, on Thicknesse's retirement, Montgomery Campbell was appointed to succeed him at St George's.

== Episcopal ministry ==
Montgomery Campbell was appointed to the episcopate as the suffragan Bishop of Willesden in 1940; consecrated a bishop by Cosmo Lang, Archbishop of Canterbury, on 25 July 1940 at St Paul's Cathedral, and translated to be the Bishop of Kensington in 1942 (his appointment was announced on 13 March and he must have been translated by the time of his successor's consecration on 25 March). He became a diocesan bishop as Bishop of Guildford in 1949 — his election was confirmed on 23 November. His diocese was of quite recent creation, having been formed in 1927. The new cathedral by Edward Maufe was under construction, and the pro-cathedral, Holy Trinity Church, in which Montgomery Campbell was enthroned, was the building in which he had been ordained a priest, 38 years earlier. At first, he was doubtful about the need for a new cathedral, but once he had recognised it as a good thing he backed it enthusiastically.

On the retirement of William Wand, Montgomery Campbell became the Bishop of London in 1956, in which position he also became a Privy Councillor. His election to the See was confirmed on 24 January 1956. He became known for his wit, which was sometimes cutting. In the 1990s, his bons mots were recalled in the columns of The Times. On Mervyn Stockwood's appointment to the bishopric of Southwark, he commented, "I'm taking steps to have the Thames widened"; and later, when encountering Stockwood who was dressed not in the customary black frock coat and gaiters but in purple cassock and cloak, he greeted him, "Hello, Mervyn, incognito I see." He described Geoffrey Fisher, Archbishop of Canterbury, as "a hard man — he boils his eggs in widows' tears". About to interview an ordinand he said, "Come in, Brown. Take a chair." The young man corrected him: "Fiennes-Brown, my Lord." "Take two chairs" was the reply. Commenting on his predecessors and successors at Guildford he said, "The first Bishop of Guildford went out of his mind, the second had no mind to go out of, then they had me, then a saint, and now they have started all over again." At his enthronement as Bishop of London he banged ceremonially with his crosier on the great West door of St Paul's, which there was some delay in opening. He turned to his chaplain and said, "We've come to the wrong place". When the door was finally opened revealing the aged canons of the cathedral, he commented, "The See gives up its dead". (Note: A reference to Revelation 20:13: "And the sea gave up the dead which were in it".)

A modest man, he called himself "one who is no figure in public life and no scholar, but simply and solely a Father in God who goes round the parishes visiting the chaps – the only thing I am any good at". His obituarist in The Times commented that this was an underestimate of Montgomery Campbell's abilities, and that he was "a wise and discerning administrator, who could quickly grasp the essentials of a situation and impart to it his own sure touch. He was at heart a man of prayer and great dedication."

Montgomery Campbell retired on 31 July 1961. He died at the age of 83 in Westminster Hospital on 26 December 1970 having contracted bronchial pneumonia after falling during a power cut and fracturing his thigh. The funeral was a quiet service at St Stephen's, Westminster on 31 December, and he was buried at Wivelsfield, Sussex. A memorial service was held in St Paul's Cathedral the following month. He was predeceased by his wife, who died in 1928; he was survived by their four daughters and one son.

== Notes and references ==
=== External links ===
- Newsreel footage of Montgomery-Campbell's enthronement at St Paul's
- Newsreel footage of the re-consecration of St Clement Danes

Church of England titles
Preceded by Vernon Smith	Bishop of Willesden; 1940–1942	Succeeded by Michael Gresford Jones
Preceded by Bertram Simpson	Bishop of Kensington; 1942–1949	Succeeded by Cyril Easthaugh
Preceded by John Macmillan	Bishop of Guildford; 1949–1956	Succeeded by Ivor Watkins
Preceded by William Wand	Bishop of London; 1956–1961	Succeeded by Robert Stopford
