= Friedrich Christoph Perthes =

German publisher

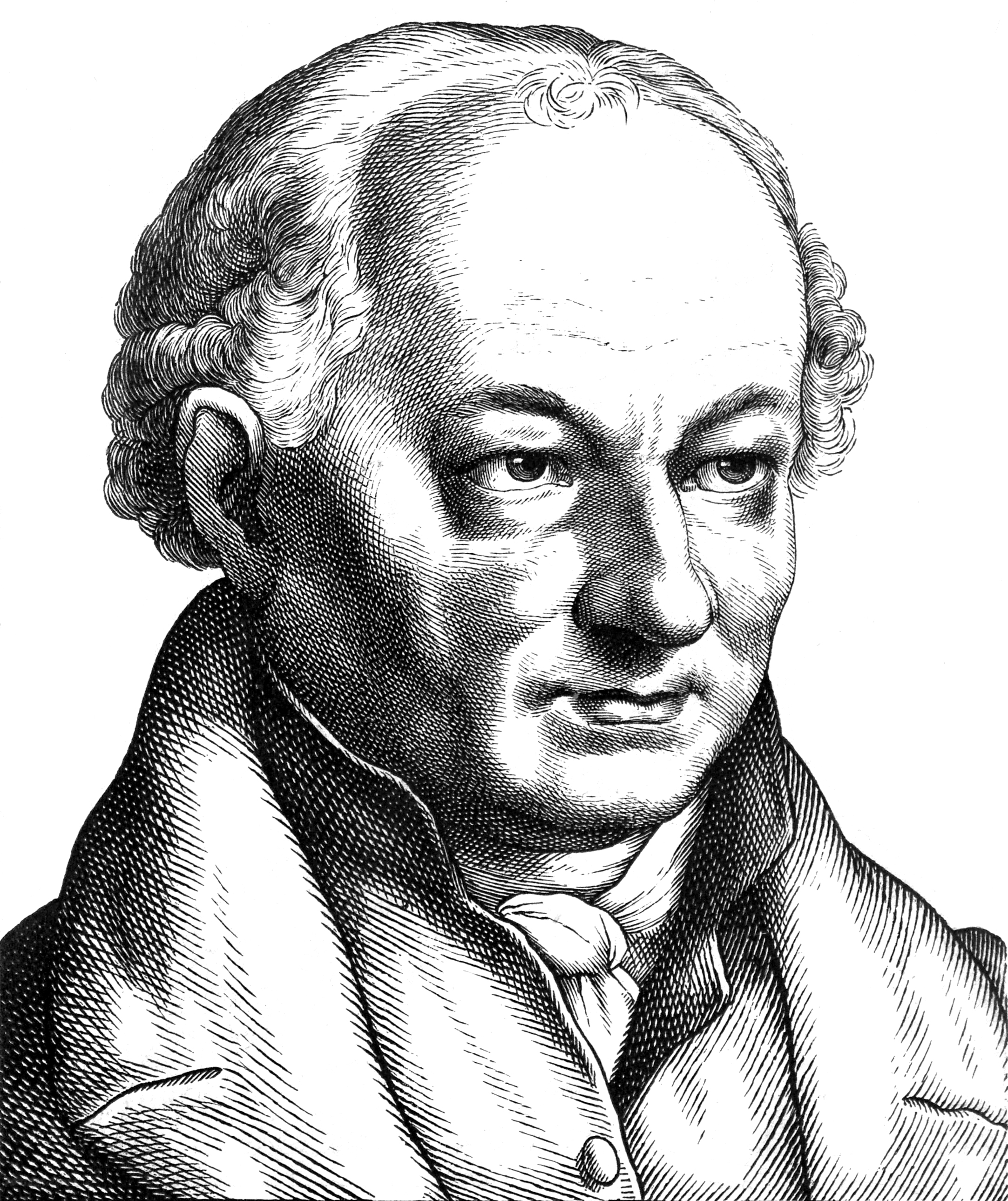
Friedrich Christoph Perthes

Friedrich Christoph Perthes (21 April 1772 – 18 May 1843) was a German publisher. He was the nephew of Johan Georg Perthes.

== Life ==
Perthes was born at Rudolstadt, Schwarzburg-Rudolstadt. At the age of fifteen he became an apprentice in the service of Adam Friedrich Bohme, a bookseller in Leipzig, with whom he remained for about six years. In Hamburg, where he settled in 1793 as an assistant to the bookseller Benjamin Gottlob Hoffmann, he started in 1796 a book selling business of his own, and in 1798 he entered into partnership with his brother-in-law, Johann Heinrich Besser (1775–1826). By his marriage in 1797 with a daughter of the poet, Matthias Claudius, he was brought into intimate relation with a group of Protestant writers, who exercised a powerful influence on the growth of his religious opinions. This, however, did not prevent him from being on friendly terms with a number of eminent Roman Catholic authors.

Perthes was an ardent patriot; and during the period of Napoleon's supremacy he distinguished himself by his steady resistance to French pretensions. His zeal for the national cause led him, in 1810–1811, to issue Des deutsche Museum, to which many of the foremost publicists in Germany contributed. For some time the French made it impossible for him to live in Hamburg; and when, in 1814, he returned to that city he found that his business had greatly diminished. In 1821, his wife having died, he left Hamburg, transferring his business at Jungfernstieg to his partner, and went to Gotha, where he established what ultimately became one of the first publishing houses in Germany. It was owing to his initiation that the Borsenverein der deutschen Buchhandler (Union of German Booksellers) in Leipzig was founded in 1825. When the foundation-stone of the fine building of the Union was laid in 1834, Perthes was made an honorary freeman of the city of Leipzig, and in 1840 the university of Kiel conferred upon him the degree of doctor of philosophy. Perthes died at Gotha on 18 May 1843.

His Life was written by his son, Klemens Theodor Perthes (1809–1867), professor of law in the university of Bonn, and author of Das deutsche Staatsleben vor der Revolution (Hamburg and Gotha, 1845), and Das Herbergewesen der Handwerksgesellen (Gotha, 1856, and again 1883), whose son Hermann Friedrich Perthes (1840–1883) was the founder of the Fridericianum at Davos Platz. The publishing business at Gotha was carried on by Perthes's younger son, Andreas, (1813–1890) and his grandson, Emil (born 1841), until 1889, when it was handed over to a company.
