= Der Mond ist aufgegangen =

German lullaby and evening song by Matthias Claudius

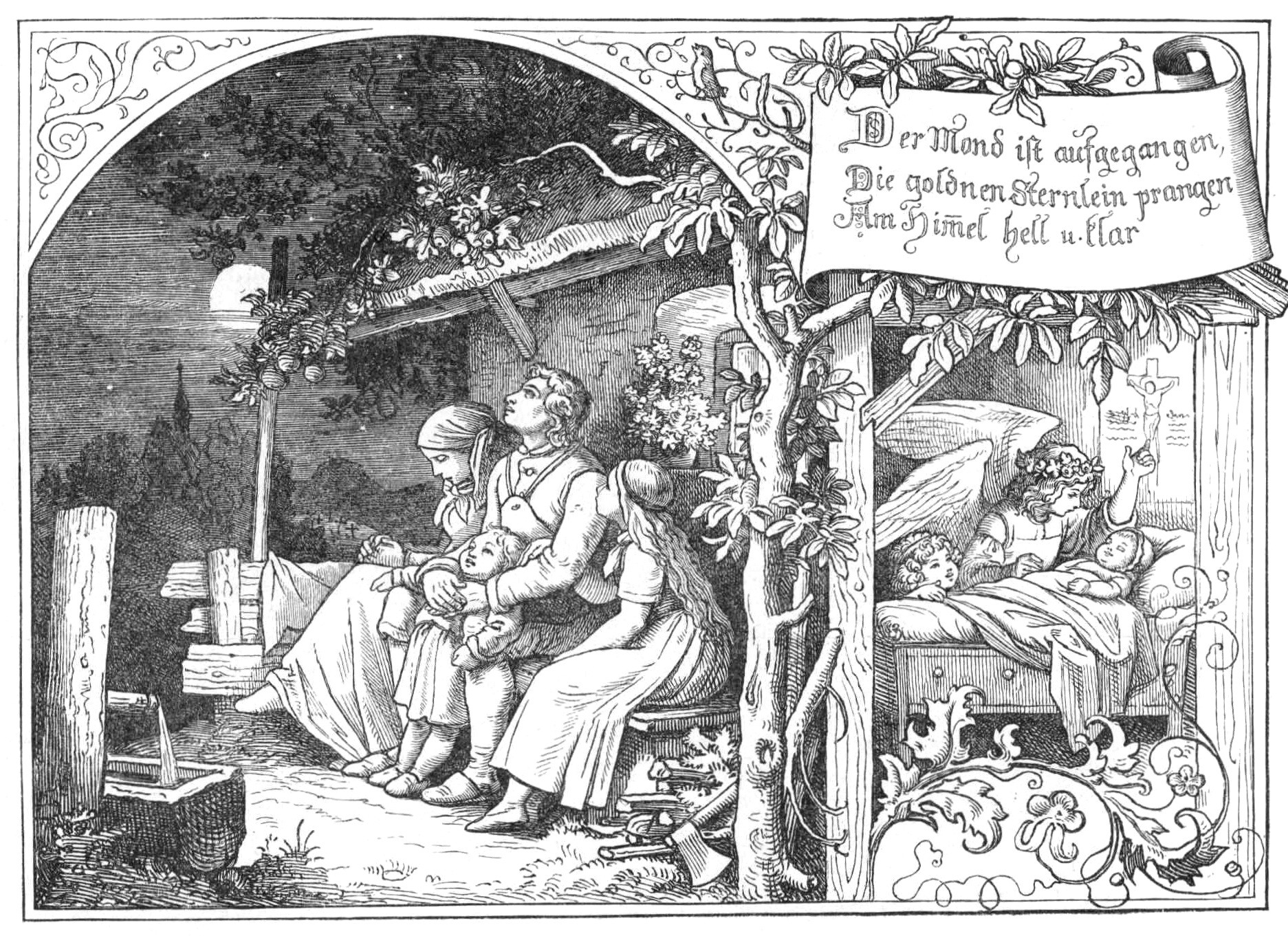
"Der Mond ist aufgegangen", illustration by Ludwig Richter (1856)

"Der Mond ist aufgegangen" (German for "The moon has risen") is a German lullaby and evening song by Matthias Claudius, one of the most popular in German literature. Also known under the name "Abendlied" (German for "evening song") it was first released in Musen-Almanach in 1779, published by Johann Heinrich Voß. In 1783, Claudius published the poem with a modification to verse six in Asmus omnia sua secum portans oder Sämmtliche Werke des Wandsbecker Bothen IV. Theil.

The poem "Nun ruhen alle Wälder" (German for "Now all forests rest") by Paul Gerhardt from 1647 was its model. The exact dating is unclear; some believe that it was written in 1778 in Hamburg-Wandsbek, others that it originated earlier in Darmstadt.

== Melody and text ==
The melody first associated with the poem was composed by Johann Abraham Peter Schulz and published in his 1790 collection Lieder im Volkston, bey dem Claviere zu singen – this remains the most popular version (see notation below). Among many other settings, the text is also often found set to the melody of the above-mentioned 'Nun ruhen alle Wälder' (Innsbruck, ich muss dich lassen, by Heinrich Isaac).

Der Mond ist aufgegangen
Die goldnen Sternlein prangen
Am Himmel hell und klar:
Der Wald steht schwarz und schweiget,
Und aus den Wiesen steiget
Der weiße Nebel wunderbar.

Wie ist die Welt so stille,
Und in der Dämmrung Hülle
So traulich und so hold!
Als eine stille Kammer,
Wo ihr des Tages Jammer
Verschlafen und vergessen sollt.

Seht ihr den Mond dort stehen?
Er ist nur halb zu sehen,
Und ist doch rund und schön.
So sind wohl manche Sachen,
Die wir getrost belachen,
Weil unsre Augen sie nicht sehn.

Wir stolze Menschenkinder
Sind eitel arme Sünder,
Und wissen gar nicht viel;
Wir spinnen Luftgespinste,
Und suchen viele Künste,
Und kommen weiter von dem Ziel.

Gott, laß uns dein Heil schauen,
Auf nichts vergänglichs trauen,
Nicht Eitelkeit uns freun!
Laß uns einfältig werden,
Und vor dir hier auf Erden
Wie Kinder fromm und fröhlich sein!

Wollst endlich sonder Grämen
Aus dieser Welt uns nehmen
Durch einen sanften Tod,
Und wenn du uns genommen,
Laß uns in Himmel kommen,
Du lieber treuer frommer Gott!

So legt euch denn, ihr Brüder,
In Gottes Namen nieder!
Kalt ist der Abendhauch.
Verschon' uns Gott mit Strafen,
Und laß uns ruhig schlafen,
Und unsern kranken Nachbar auch!

The moon is risen, beaming,
The golden stars are gleaming
So brightly in the skies;
The hushed, black woods are dreaming,
The mists, like phantoms seeming,
From meadows magically rise.

How still the world reposes,
While twilight round it closes,
So peaceful and so fair!
A quiet room for sleeping,
Into oblivion steeping
The day's distress and sober care.

Look at the moon so lonely!
One half is shining only,
Yet she is round and bright;
Thus oft we laugh unknowing
At things that are not showing,
That still are hidden from our sight.

We, with our proud endeavour,
Are poor vain sinners ever,
There's little that we know.
Frail cobwebs we are spinning,
Our goal we are not winning,
But straying farther as we go.

God, make us see Thy glory,
Distrust things transitory,
Delight in nothing vain!
Lord, here on earth stand by us,
To make us glad and pious,
And artless children once again!

Grant that, without much grieving,
This world we may be leaving
In gentle death at last.
And then do not forsake us,
But into heaven take us,
Lord God, oh, hold us fast!

Lie down, my friends, reposing,
Your eyes in God's name closing.
How cold the night-wind blew!
Oh God, Thine anger keeping,
Now grant us peaceful sleeping,
And our sick neighbour too.

== See also ==
- Christian child's prayer § Lullabies
