= Campbell of Barrichbeyan =

The Campbells of Barrichbeyan form one of the branches of the Campbells of Craignish who in turn are a branch of the Clan Campbell, a Scottish clan in Argyll, Scottish Highlands. They claim descent from Donald McEan Gorm Campbell, the 10th Laird of Craignish, 11th Chieftain of Craignish & 1st Baron Campbell of Barrichbeyan, himself second son of John Ean Gorm Campbell, 9th Laird of Craignish. His descendants retained Barrichbeyan and bought back the greater part of the estate of Craignish between 1550 and 1680. Beside the main line established in Craignish there were also cadet lines, Campbells of Lagganlochan and Campbells of Ballachlavan, later producing another cadet line, Campbells of Askomel.

== Campbells of Barrichbeyan ==
Barrichbeyan (in various sources spelled also as Barrichibean and Barrichebean) is situated on the north of Craignish peninsula. It was possessed by MacIgheil family. Donald McEan Gorm Campbell, second son of John Ean Gorm Campbell, 9th Laird and 10th Chieftain of Craignish, married Effreta, daughter to the last MacIgheil, Baron of Barrichbeyan and became 1st Baron of Barrichbeyan of the Campbell family. His descendant, John Campbell, 6th Baron of Barrichbeyan, had five sons:

1. Donald "Ronald Roy" Campbell, 7th Baron of Barrichbeyan.
2. Archibald Campbell, died without issue.
3. John Campbell, killed in Java during an insurrection of the slaves.
4. George Campbell, 1st of Ballachlavan
5. Alexander Campbell, ancestors of Campbells of Barrowlerie.

Donald "Ronald Roy" Campbell, 7th Baron of Barrichbeyan, born 1555, died 1639.

== Campbells of Lagganlochan ==
The Campbells of Lagganlochan claim descent from Farquhard Campbell of Lagganlochan, third but second surviving son of Donald (Ronald Roy) Campbel, of Barrichbeyan and Craignish.

== Baron Craignish, of the Duchy of Saxe-Coburg and Gotha ==
Fourth son of Farquhard Campbell of Lagganlochan, Lieutenant-Colonel Ronald Campbell, born 12 September 1763, married Charlotte, daughter of Peter Laurentz Clocté of the Cape of Good Hope. His grandson, Ronald MacLeay Laurentz Campbell, born 24 December 1836, served as aide-de-camp to the Duke of Saxe-Coburg-Gotha. He was created Baron Craignish by Ernest II, Duke of Saxe-Coburg and Gotha in 1882. In January 1883 he was granted permission to use the title in the United Kingdom. He was succeeded in 1897 by his son Ronald, second Baron Craignish, of the Duchy of Saxe-Coburg and Gotha, born 6 April 1866. He died in 1920 without issue causing his Barony to become extinct.

== Baron Campbell von Laurentz, of the Duchy of Saxe-Coburg and Gotha ==
Younger brother of Ronald MacLeay Laurentz Campbell, first Baron Craignish, of the Duchy of Saxe-Coburg and Gotha, Edmund Kempt Laurentz Campbell, born 8 July 1848, also served as aide-de-camp to the Duke of Saxe-Coburg-Gotha. He had distinguished himself in August 1870 during the Franco-Prussian War. On 16 August at the battle of Mars-La-Tour/Gravelotte he was wounded leading a cavalry charge against the French and subsequently awarded the Iron Cross. He was created Baron Campbell of Laurentz by Ernest II, Duke of Saxe-Coburg and Gotha in 1886. In February 1887 he was granted permission to use the title in the United Kingdom. Edmund Campbell's marriage was childless and with his death in 1917, the Barony became extinct.

== Campbells of Ballachlavan ==
The Campbells of Ballachlavan claim descent from George Campbell of Ballachlavan, fourth son of John Campbel, of Barrichbeyan.

== Campbells of Askomel ==
=== Overview ===
The Campbells of Askomel claim descent from Archibald Campbell of Askomel, son of John Campbell, of Ballachlavan, in Killarow. Archibald married Margaret, daughter of Rev. David Simson (or Simpson). His first son John Campbell, of Askomel, married in 1739 Lilias Campbell, daughter of Archibald Campbell, 8th of Inverawe. Archibald's second son, Rev. David Campbell, minister at Southend, married in 1746 Elizabeth Montgomery, daughter of Hugh Montgomery, of Broomlands, and co-heiress to her brother Charles Montgomery. David's son Archibald (1750 - 1795) assumed the additional surname of Montgomery and is ancestor of Montgomery Campbell family of whom are Henry Montgomery Campbell (1887 - 1970), Bishop of London, Hugo Martin Montgomery Campbell, born 1950, and Anna Montgomery Campbell (1991 – 15 March 2018), also known as Hêlîn Qereçox.

=== Genealogy ===
- Archibald Campbell, of Askomel (abt. 1685 - abt. 1747), acquired Askomel on 30 May 1729. He became Chamberlain of Islay in 1732 and died there, being buried at Kilnaughton in the 1740s. A tombstone for Archibald Campbell of Askomel in Kilnaughton Churchyard, Islay shows: gyronny of eight a crescent at fess point, the shield suspended from the mast of a galley oars in action. Crest: a galley sails furled pennon flying. Motto: PER TOT DISCRIMINA RERUM.
  - m. Margaret Simson, daughter of Rev. David Simson
    - John Campbell, of Askomel (±1712 - 1753)
      - m. 1739 Lillias Campbell (1716 - 1770)
        - Jean Campbell (±1740 - 1805)
          - m. 1761 James Campbell, of Killean, 2nd of Inverneill (1737 - 1805)
            - Sir James Campbell, 3rd of Inverneill, 1st Baronet (1763 - 1819)
            - John Campbell, 4th of Inverneill (1766 - 1822)
            - Duncan Campbell, 5th of Inverneill (1771 - 1840)
            - Jane Campbell (1771 - 1851)
        - Archibald Campbell, of Askomel (1747 - 1806)
          - m. 1786 Elizabeth Campbell (1757 - 1797)
            - Archibald Montgomery Campbell (1788 - 1832)
              - m. 1815 Isabella Randall (*1793)
                - Archibald Campbell (1815 - 1855)
                - William Campbell (1819 - 1858)
                - Sarah Campbell (1820 - 1905)
                  - m. 1843 Louis Rossel (1806 - 1888)
                    - Louis Nathaniel Rossel (1844 - 1871)
                - Henri Montgomery Campbell (1830 - 1874)
                  - m. 1863 Sarah Brindley Bettington (1842 - 1901)
                    - Henri Montgomery Campbell (1864 - 1914)
                      - m. 1888 Mildred Margrette Hall (1862 - 1941)
                        - John Henry Duncan Montgomery Campbell, of Askomel (1892 - 1968), Captain, Royal Air Force, late Royal Naval Air Service and Royal Naval Volunteer Reserve. Soon after the outbreak of hostilities, he was commissioned in the Royal Naval Air Service as a Flight Sub. Lieutenant. He qualified as an Armaments Officer in May 1916 and transferred to the "Wavy Navy" as a Sub. Lieutenant in the following month, in which capacity he served at Capel and Dunkirk in the period November 1916 to February 1918. Appointed a Captain (Technical) in the newly established Royal Air Force in April 1918, he was employed in the Airship Department until the end of hostilities. He served in the Royal Observer Corps during the 1939-45 War. In 1929 he matriculated arms: gyronny of eight Or and Sable a bordure chequy Gules and Or. Crest: a boar's head erased Or langued Gules. Motto: PER TOT DISCRIMINA RERUM - above; FIT VIA VI - below.
            - John Campbell (*1789)
              - m. 1817 Mary Corthine Campbell (*1793)
            - David Campbell (1792 - 1848)
              - m. 1819 Agnes Pollock
            - Annette Binning Campbell (1795 - 1876)
              - m. 1816 Thomas Cubitt (1784 - 1840)
        - Duncan Campbell (1751 - 1801)
    - David Campbell, of Southend (1714 - 1793)
      - m. 1746 Elizabeth Montgomery, daughter of Hugh Montgomery, of Broomlands
        - Mary Campbell (*1747)
          - m. ±1770 John Campbell, of Kildalloig (+1796)
        - Peter Campbell (1749 - 1771)
        - Archibald Montgomery Campbell (1750 - 1795), assumed the additional surname of Montgomery and is ancestor of Montgomery Campbell family. Arms for the Montgomery Campbell family (as given in Robertson's Ayrshire Families of 1824) are: quarterly, 1st and 4th, gyronny of eight Or and Sable a crescent Argent at fess point for difference (Campbell of Askomel); 2nd and 3rd, Azure a palm frond between three fleurs de lis Or (Montgomery of Broomlands), suspended from the mast of a galley oars in action Sable. Crest: dexter, a boar's head erased Or (Campbell of Askomel); sinister, a woman holding a head (Montgomery of Broomlands). Motto: PER TOT DISCRIMINA RERUM.
          - m. 1788 Ann Humphries (1773 - 1794)
            - Charles Montgomery Campbell (*1789)
              - m. 1811 Julia Charlotte Chesshyre (1785 - 1853)
                - Charles Montgomery Campbell (1812 - 1878)
                - Hugh Montgomery Campbell (1817 - 1892)
                  - m. 1844 Isabella Matilda Kennedy (1809 - 1882), daughter of Hon. Robert Kennedy and granddaughter of Archibald Kennedy, 11th Earl of Cassilis
                    - Arthur William Montgomery Campbell, of Bennington Park (*1852)
            - Archibald Montgomery Campbell (1790 - 1859), perpetual curate of St James's Church, Paddington, London, and rector of Little Steeping, Lincolnshire
              - m. 1814 Elizabeth Julia Chesshyre
                    - Jane Montgomery Campbell (1817 - 15 November 1878), British musician and poet
            - Annette Montgomery Campbell (1792 - 1829)
              - m. 1820 Thomas Hamilton (1789 - 1842)
            - Hugh Montgomery Campbell, Esq., of The Hollies (1794 - 1846)
              - m. 1821 Mary Hale (1795 - 1842), only daughter and heiress of John Hale, Esq., of The Hollies, and coheiress in her issue of Thomas of Woodstock through Grove, Grey and Bourchier line of descent.
                - Hugh John Montgomery Campbell (*1825)
                - Henry Jermyn Montgomery Campbell, of Thurmaston Hall (1827 - 1893)
                  - m. 1854 Louisa Sydney Carroll (1830 - 1904), daughter of Rear admiral Sir William Fairbrother Carroll (1784 - 1862) by his wife Martha, daughter of Vice-admiral Sir Richard Dacres (1761 - 1837).
                    - Hugo Montgomery Campbell (1856 - 1936)
                      - m. 1886 Ethel Agnes Wray (1866 - 1952)
                        - Lt. Col. Hugo Archibald Leslie Montgomery Campbell (1910 - 1974)
                          - m. 1941 Jean E Fettes (*1916)
                            - David Mark Montgomery Campbell (*1943)
                          - m. 1947 Mary Elizabeth Shaw (*1923)
                            - Hugo Martin Montgomery Campbell (*1950)
                              - m. Stacey Lee
                                - Rayne Elizabeth Montgomery Campbell (*1977)
                                - Hester Montgomery Campbell (*1980)
                                - Sara Montgomery Campbell (*1982)
                              - m. 1989 Katherine Emma Bridges (1960 - 2012)
                                - Sophie Montgomery Campbell (*1990)
                                - Anna Montgomery Campbell (1991 - 2018)
                                - Rose Montgomery Campbell (*1995)
                                - Adam Montgomery Campbell (*1998)
                    - Sidney Montgomery Campbell (1858 - 1942)
                      - m. Susan Colville Potter (1853 - 1934)
                        - St. John Dacres Montgomery Campbell (*1885)
                        - Henry Colville Montgomery Campbell (1887 - 1970), Bishop of Willesden 1940–1942, Bishop of Kensington 1942–1949, Bishop of Guildford 1949–1956, Bishop of London 1956–1961.
                          - m. 1915 Joyce Mary Thicknesse (1889 - 1928)
                            - Hugh Montgomery Campbell (1919 - 1980)
                              - m. 1950 Mary Adderley (1922 - 2019), daughter of Hubert Adderley, 6th Baron Norton (1886 – 1961), grandson of Charles Adderley, 1st Baron Norton (1814 – 1905).
                                - Sir Philip Henry Montgomery Campbell (*1951), British astrophysicist.
                    - Eleanor Georgina Montgomery Campbell (*1862)
                      - m. 1887 General Sir Henry Macleod Leslie Rundle (1856 - 1934)
                    - Archibald Montgomery Campbell (+1934)
                - George Peter Montgomery Campbell (1830 - 1871), Professor of Classical Literature and History in the University of New Brunswick, Canada, after whom the Montgomery - Campbell Prize, UNB, is named.
                  - m. 1858 Sophia Storie Saunders (1832 - 1893), granddaughter of The Hon. John Saunders (D.C.L.) Chief Justice of the colonial Province of New Brunswick
                    - Colonel Henry Montgomery Campbell (1859 - 1933), commanding officer of the 64th Battalion, CEF, OBE
                      - m. Laura Winslow (1864 - 1953)
                        - Lieutenant Herbert Montgomery-Campbell (1898 - 1916), of the 64th Battalion and of the 5th Battalion, Canadian Mounted Rifles
                    - Brigadier-General Herbert Montgomery Campbell (1861 - 1937), C.B., C.M.G., R.A., commissioned with the Royal Artillery in the Imperial Army, served in Africa during the Boer War; and commanded the 46th Divisional Artillery in the Great War
                      - m. Florence Maud King
                    - Rachel Mary Montgomery Campbell
                      - m. 1896 Aldham Wilson Robarts (1863 - 1922)
                        - John Aldham Robarts (1901 - 1991), prominent Canadian Baháʼí.
        - Hugh Campbell (1755 - 1798)
        - Elizabeth Campbell (1757 - 1797)
          - m. 1786 Archibald Campbell, of Askomel (1747 - 1806) (see above)
        - Grace Campbell (1759 - 1823)
        - Isabella Campbell (*1761)
