= Wir pflügen und wir streuen =

German hymn

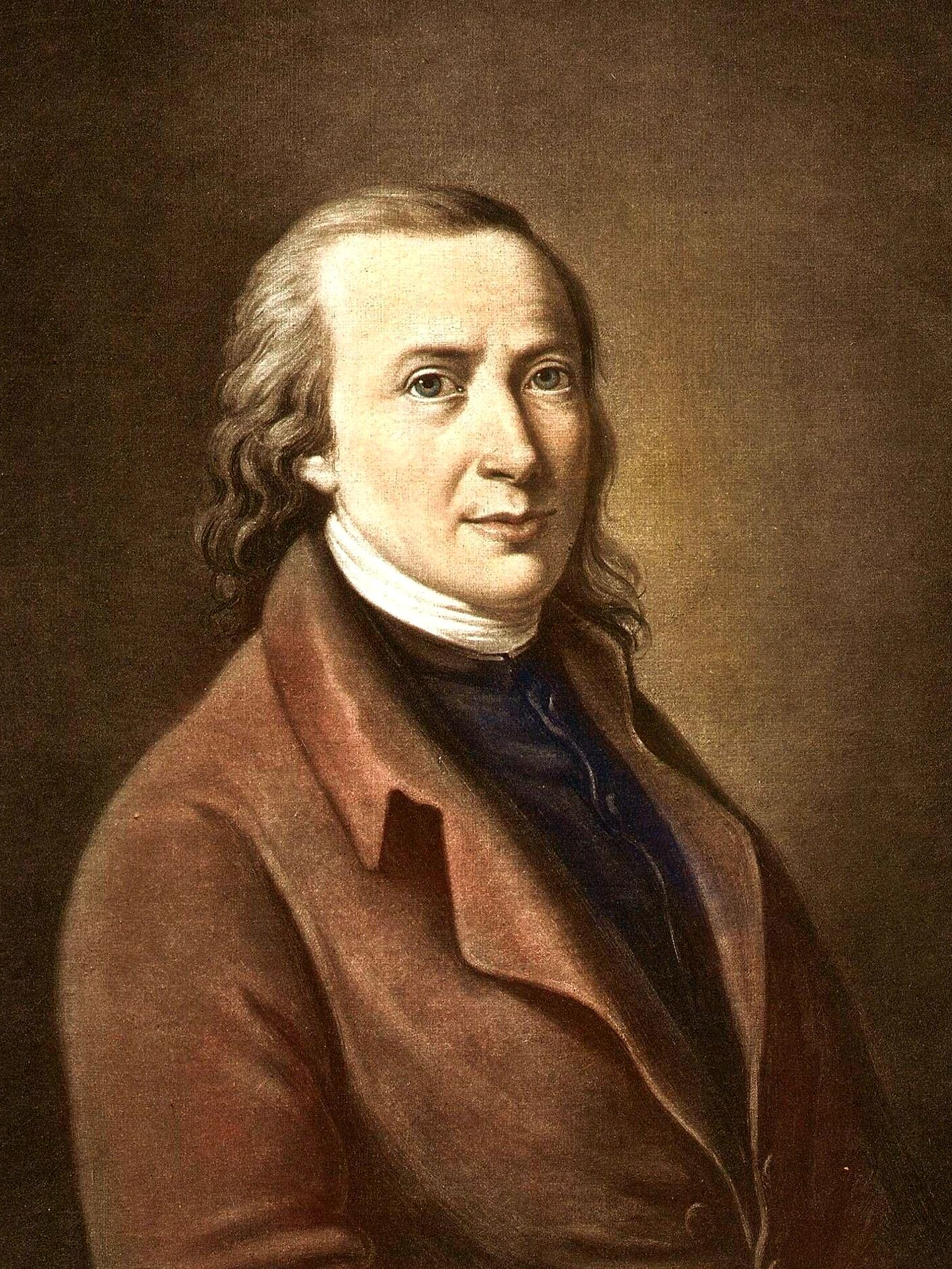
- Matthias Claudius, the writer of the poem
- English: "We plough the fields and scatter"
- Written: 1783
- Text: by Matthias Claudius
- Language: German
- Melody: Claudius; Johann André; Johann Abraham Peter Schulz

"Wir pflügen und wir streuen" (We plough and sow) is a sacred song about thanksgiving for harvest, with text by Matthias Claudius. It was first published in 1783 as Das Bauernlied (The peasants' song). It became a hymn, with melodies by Johann André and Johann Abraham Peter Schulz. It appears in the current German Protestant hymnal Evangelisches Gesangbuch as EG 508 with the latter melody, and is used mostly for the German Erntedankfest. The song is also known by its refrain, "Alle gute Gabe" (All good gift). Jane Montgomery Campbell translated it to English in 1861 as "We plough the fields and scatter".

== History ==
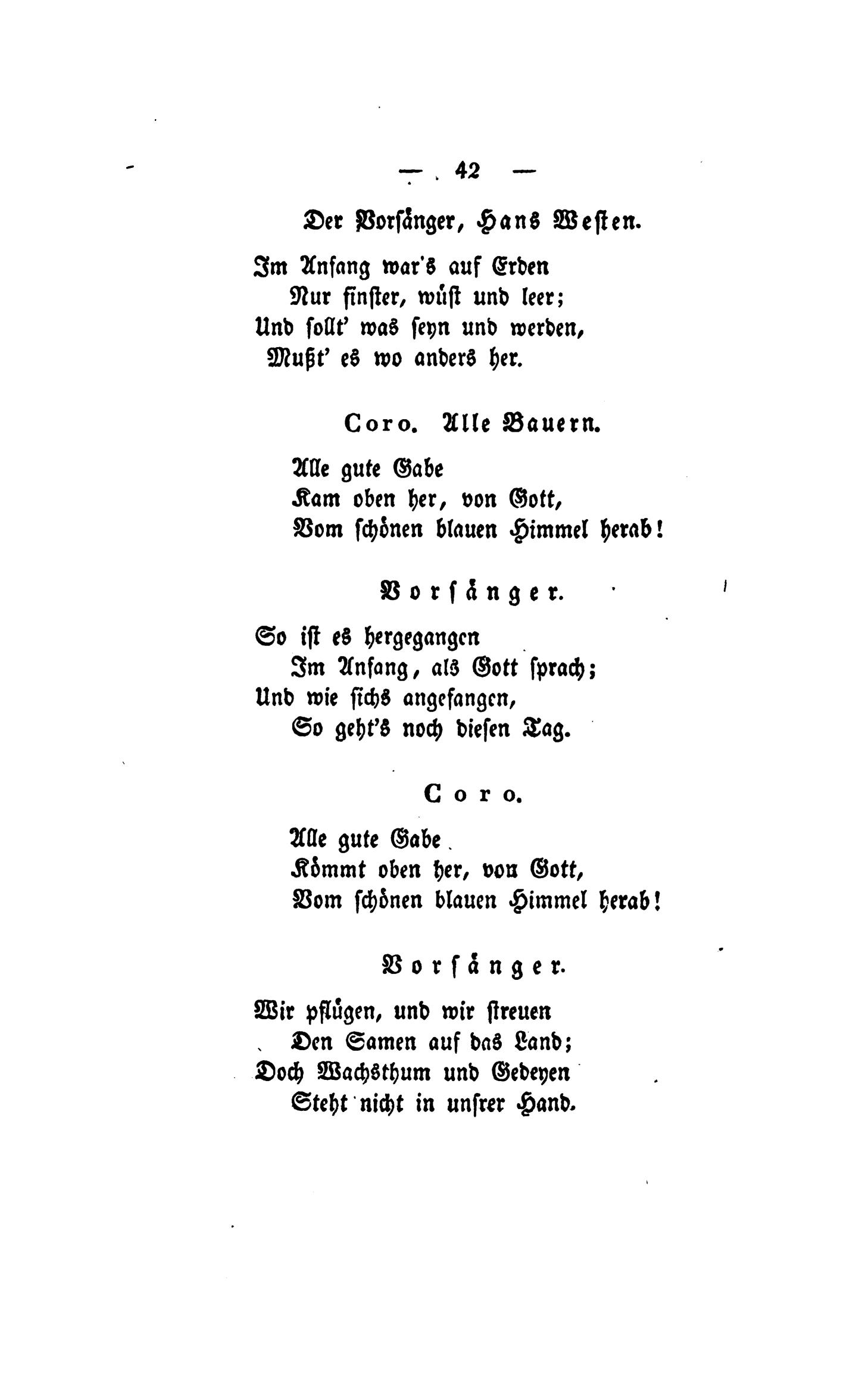
First edition

The poem appeared first in 1783 as part of an article by Claudius in the fourth volume of Der Wandsbecker Bothe. Titled Paul Erdmanns Fest, it describes a fictional rural harvest festival. As its highlight, a song is performed, alternating a cantor and the choir of the other peasants who sing a refrain.

The early version began with a line "Im Anfang war’s auf Erden", describing the beginning according to the Book of Genesis 1:2. It had 16 stanzas, and a refrain that was slightly different from today's version. Claudius added his own melody to the poem.

=== Melodies ===
Claudius added his own melody to the poem. In the 19th century, Johann André composed a new melody and chose eight of the stanzas for a version which appeared in both Protestant and Catholic hymnals, often sung in schools. Other melodies were also created for a song which became popular.

The melody still used in current songbooks is attributed to Johann Abraham Peter Schulz, and was published first in 1800 in Hanover in the second edition of a collection Melodien für Volksschulen (Melodies for elementary schools). His text has stanzas three to ten of Claudius, pairing two of them to one new stanza, with a slightly modified refrain. At the same time, the song entered official Protestant hymnals, such as an Oldenburg hymnal in 1791, and hymnals in Königsberg and Bremen in 1812. The Evangelisches Kirchengesangbuch of 1950 contained the hymn in several regional editions. The sequel, Evangelisches Gesangbuch of 1995 has the song as EG 708 in the section Natur und Jahreszeiten (Nature and seasons). It is also part of the Swiss Reformed hymnal, and the hymnal of the Methodist Church of 2002.

== Translation ==
In 1861, Jane Montgomery Campbell created a free translation to English in three stanzas, "We plough the fields and scatter". It was included, with a musical setting of the melody by Schulz by John Bacchus Dykes, in various hymnals of different denominations. It became a popular song for the Harvest festival in Britain and Thanksgiving in the United States.
