= Arthur Hook =

English cricketer (1877–1957)

Personal information
- Full name: Arthur James Hook
- Born: 12 February 1877; Porlock, Somerset, England
- Died: 12 February 1957 (aged 80); Over Stowey, Bridgwater, Somerset, England
- Batting: Left-handed

Domestic team information
- Years: Team
- 1897–1906: Somerset

Career statistics
Competition	FC
Matches	2
Runs scored	43
Batting average	14.33
100s/50s	0/0
Top score	15*
Catches/stumpings	1/–
- Source: CricketArchive, 22 December 2015

Arthur James Hook (12 February 1877 – 12 February 1957) played first-class cricket for Somerset in two matches, one in 1897 and one in 1906. He was born at Porlock, Somerset, and died on his 80th birthday at Over Stowey, also in Somerset.

Hook played as a left-handed batsman in the lower middle order. His first game was against Oxford University in 1897, when he scored 7 and 15. His only other match came nine years later against Hampshire and he scored 6 and 15, with the second innings being not out.
