= Matthias Claudius =

German poet and journalist (1740–1815)

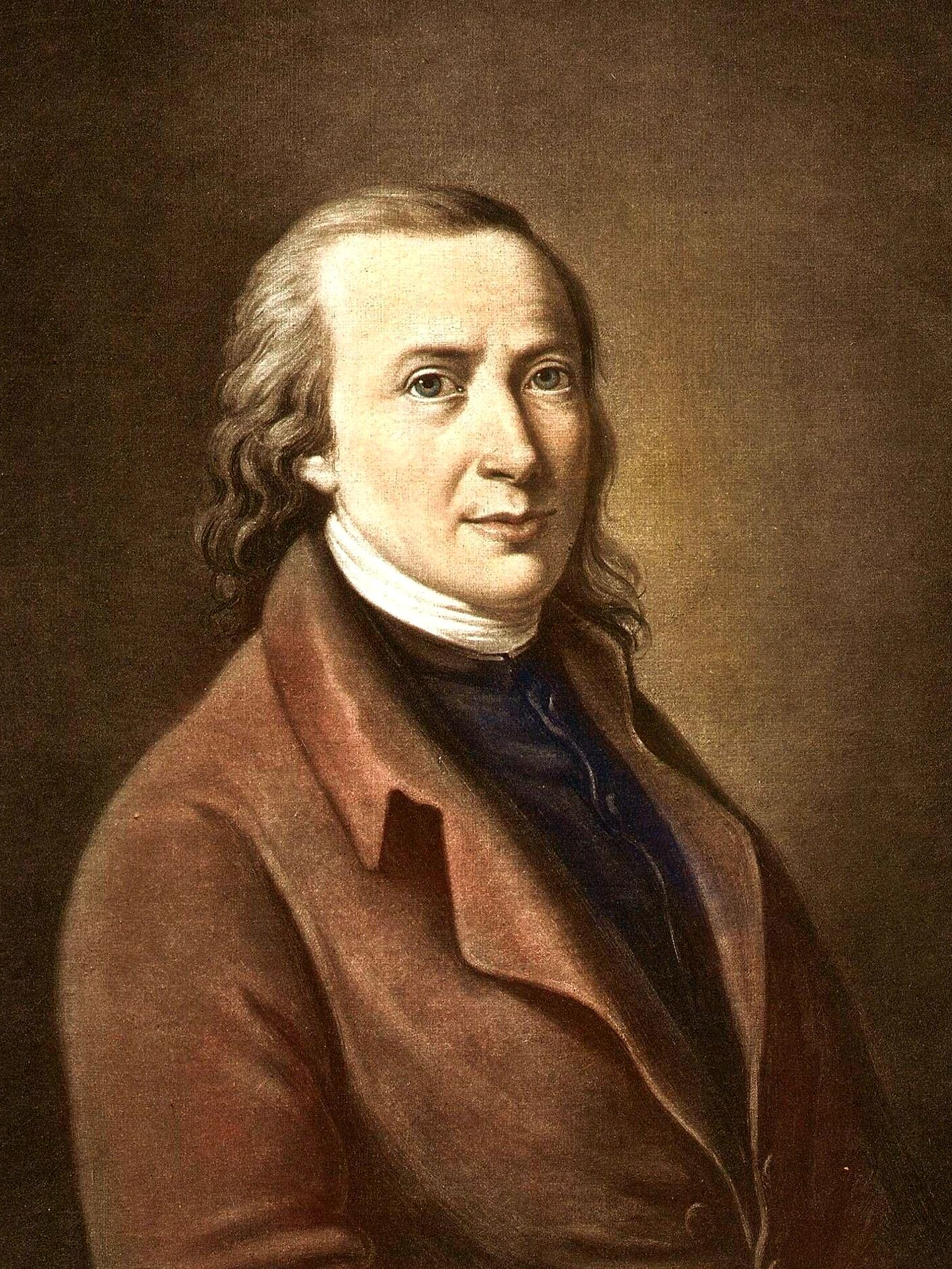
- Born: 15 August 1740; Reinfeld, Duchy of Holstein
- Died: 21 January 1815 (aged 74); Free and Hanseatic City of Hamburg
- Relatives: Friedrich Christoph Perthes (son-in-law); Carl Wigand Maximilian Jacobi (son-in-law)
- Writing career
- Pen name: Asmus
- Language: German

Matthias Claudius (15 August 1740 – 21 January 1815) was a German poet and journalist, otherwise known by the pen name of "Asmus".

== Life ==
Claudius was born at Reinfeld, near Lübeck, and studied at Jena. He spent the greater part of his life in the town of Wandsbeck, where he earned his first literary reputation by editing from 1771 to 1775, a newspaper called Der Wandsbecker Bothe (The Wandsbeck Messenger) (Wandsbeck until the year 1879 still written with "ck". Today only with "k".), in which he published a large number of prose essays and poems. They were written in pure and simple German, and appealed to the popular taste; in many there was a vein of extravagant humour or even burlesque, while others were full of quiet meditation and solemn sentiment. In his later days, perhaps through the influence of Klopstock, with whom he had formed an intimate acquaintance, Claudius became strongly pietistic, and the graver side of his nature showed itself. In 1814 he moved to Hamburg, to the house of his son-in-law, the publisher Friedrich Christoph Perthes, where he died on 21 January 1815.

== Work ==
Claudius's poem Death and the Maiden was used by composer Franz Schubert in 1817 for one of his most celebrated songs, which in turn became the basis for the 1824 string quartet of the same name. In Germany, his poem Abendlied (Evening song), also known as "Der Mond ist aufgegangen" remains popular.

Claudius's collected works were published under the title of Asmus omnia sua secum portans, oder Sämtliche Werke des Wandsbecker Boten (8 vols., 1775–1812; 13th edition, by C. Redich, 2 vols., 1902). His biography has been written by Wilhelm Herbst (4th ed., 1878). See also M. Schneidereit, M. Claudius, seine Weltanschauung und Lebensweisheit (1898).

=== Poems ===
- Abendlied ("Evening Song"), aka "Der Mond ist aufgegangen" ("The moon has risen")
- "Der Mensch lebt und bestehet", set to music by Max Reger
- "Christiane"
- "Die Sternseherin Lise" (Lise the astrologer)
- "Die Liebe" (Love)
- "Der Tod (Death)
- "Ein Wiegenlied bei Mondschein zu singen" (A lullaby to sing in moonlight)
- "Täglich zu singen" (To be sung every day)
- "Kriegslied" (Song of war)
- "Der Frühling. Am ersten Maimorgen" (The Spring. On the first morning in May)
- "Der Säemann säet den Samen" (The sower sows the seeds), set to music by Ernst Krenek (Drei gemischte a cappella-Chöre, Opus 22 )
- "Der Tod und das Mädchen" (The Death and the maiden), set to music by Schubert
- "Wir pflügen und wir streuen" ("We plough the fields and scatter" – sung in Germany and England as a harvest festival hymn)

== Honours ==
- Asteroid 7117 Claudius was named after him.
