= Apostelkirche =

Church building in Gütersloh, Germany

Coordinates: 51°54′17″N 8°22′43″E

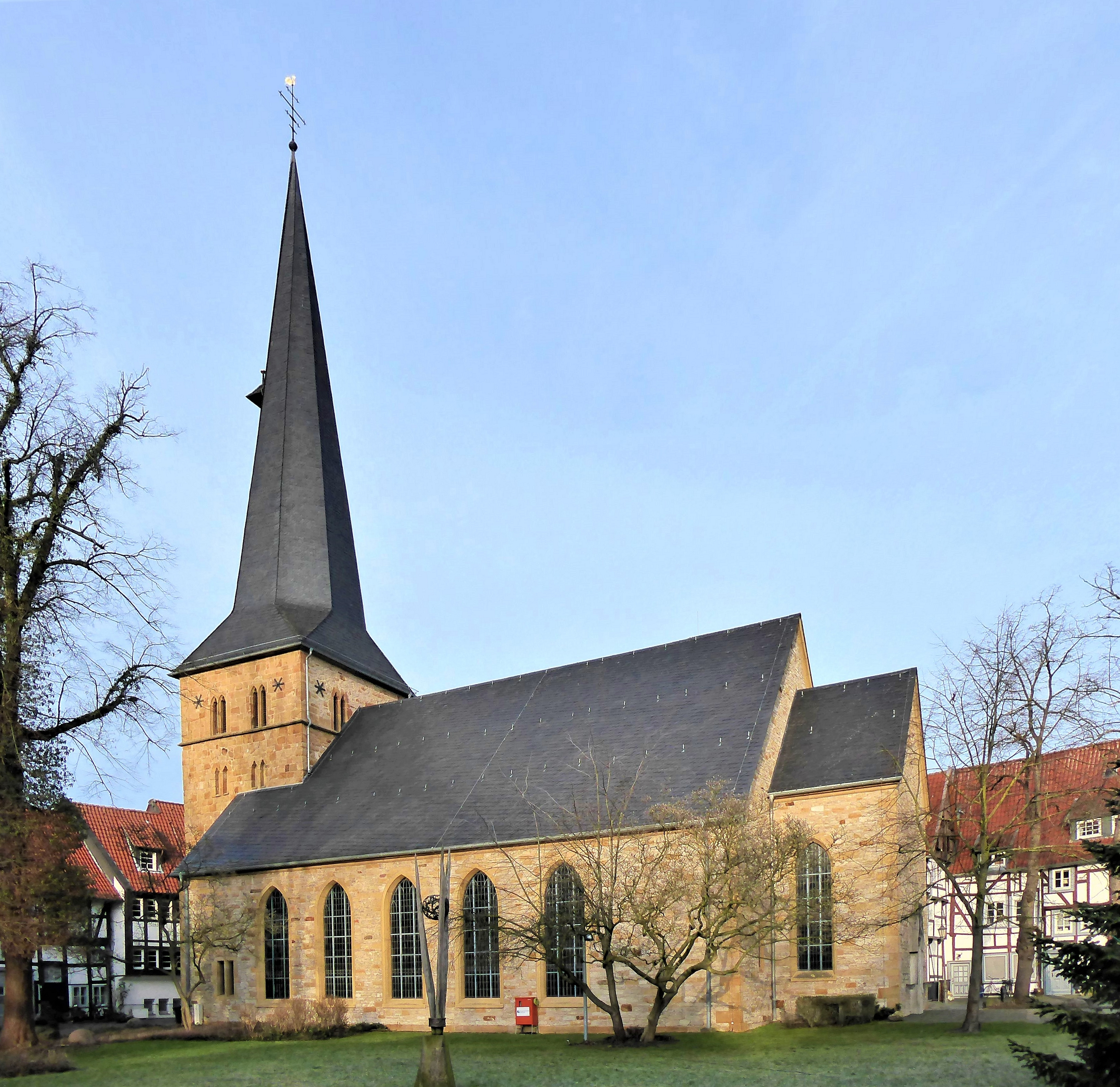
Apostelkirche (Gütersloh)

The Apostelkirche is the oldest church building in the district town of Gütersloh in North Rhine-Westphalia. The church was declared a listed building in 1984.

== History ==
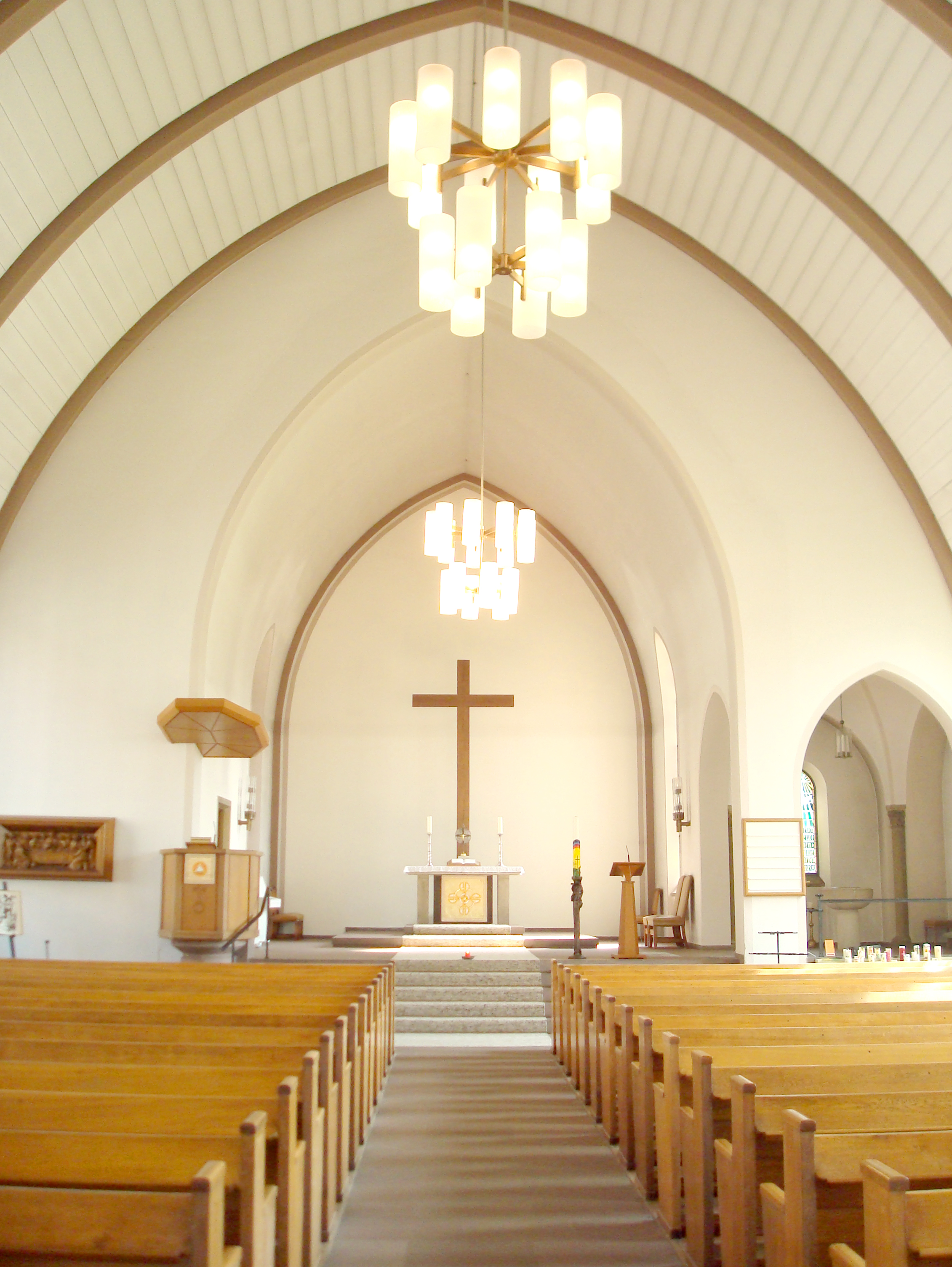
Apostelkirche (inside)

The church marks the centre of the former church village, which was the nucleus of the later town of Gütersloh. Already around 800 a wooden chapel could have stood here. The first stone church dates from 1201. A few wall remains are still preserved in the tower of today's church, the rest burned down at the beginning of the 16th century.

The special feature of the Apostle Church is its use as a simultaneous church between 1655 and 1890. The faithful of the majority Protestant church village and the northern and western building communities, which all belonged to the dominion of Rheda, shared the church with the Catholic faithful, who came from the southern and eastern building communities belonging to the prince bishopric of Osnabrück. The Simultaneum only ended with the inauguration of the Catholic Church of St. Pankratius not far from the Old Church Square. Up to this time the present-day Apostle Church bore the name "St. Pankratius", so the Catholics took the name with them to their new building. The three-nave hall church was largely destroyed by bombs on the Sunday of Death in 1944, and several citizens who had sought shelter in it died. A painting by Heinz Beck showing the scenery of the destroyed church square can be seen in the church.

The foundation stone for today's building was laid in 1951 according to plans by Werner March, who had also designed the Olympiastadion Berlin. A pointed arched, barrel vaulted hall church with approx. 400 seats was built. Four corner columns with late Romanesque leaf capitals from the destroyed choir were reused. In the tower hall there is a chandelier from 1743. At the back of the church a sculpture by the sculptor Willy Meller, created in 1955 and known for numerous works in the service of National Socialism, commemorates the victims of the Second World War.

On the 60th anniversary of its reconstruction in 2012, the Apostle Church was given a new interior painting and a modern lighting system.

== Literature ==
Werner Freitag: Geschichte der Stadt Gütersloh, Verlag für Regionalgeschichte; Edition: 2 (21 August 2003), German. ISBN 978-3895345005
