= August Harder =

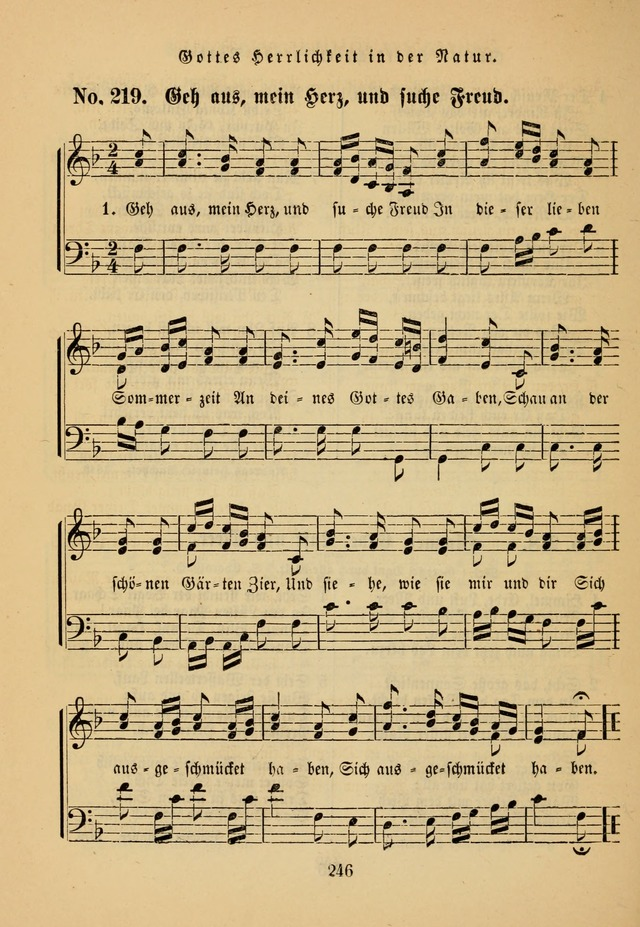
- Harder's popular hymn in a hymnal of the Lutheran congregations in Philadelphia, 1876
- Born: Augustin Harder; 17 July 1775; Schönerstädt near Leisnig
- Died: 22 October 1813 (aged 38); Munich
- Occupations: Musician; Composer; Writer; Music teacher
- Organizations: Society of Jesus

August Harder (17 July 1775 – 22 October 1813) was a German musician, composer and writer. He is known for the melody to Paul Gerhardt's sacred summer song "Geh aus, mein Herz, und suche Freud".

Born Augustin Harder in Schönerstädt near Leisnig, Saxony, he grew up as the son of the village teacher, receiving the first music lessons from his father. He attended a gymnasium Dresden, and then studied theology at the Leipzig University. He gave private music lessons to make a living. He dropped out of theology to pursue music, his vocation. He worked as a freelance musician, as singer, pianist, guitarist, also as a composer, writer and teacher. He died there on 22 October 1813.

Harder composed singable melodies, of which the one to Paul Gerhardt's sacred summer song "Geh aus, mein Herz, und suche Freud" was of lasting popularity. Although church musicians disliked its melismas and merry character, and tried various other melodies with the text in hymnals, it is now part of the Protestant German hymnal Evangelisches Gesangbuch of 1993, as EG 503.

== Literature ==
- Friedrich Wilhelm Bautz (1990). "Harder, Augustin". In Bautz, Friedrich Wilhelm (ed.). Biographisch-Bibliographisches Kirchenlexikon (BBKL) (in German). Vol. 2. Hamm: Bautz. col. 532. ISBN 3-88309-032-8.
- Matthias Werner: Harder, August. In: Wolfgang Herbst: Wer ist wer im Gesangbuch? Vandenhoeck & Ruprecht, Göttingen 2001, ISBN 3-525-50323-7, S. 131 f. (, p. 131, at Google Books).
