= Johann Abraham Peter Schulz =

German musician and composer (1747–1800)

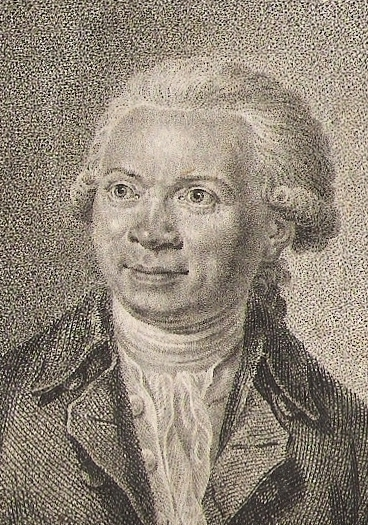
Johann Abraham Peter Schulz

Johann Abraham Peter Schulz (31 March 1747 – 10 June 1800) was a German musician. He is best known as the composer of the melody for Matthias Claudius's poems "Der Mond ist aufgegangen" and "Wir pflügen und wir streuen", and the Christmas carol "Ihr Kinderlein kommet".

== Life ==
Schulz was born in Lüneburg, where he attended St. Michaelis school from 1757 to 1759 and then the Johanneum from 1759 to 1764. In 1765, he was the student in Berlin of composer Johann Kirnberger (who was a pupil of Bach), and then taught in Berlin himself. In 1768 Kirnberger recommended Schulz for the position of music teacher and accompanist to the Polish Princess Sapieha Woiwodin von Smolensk. Schulz traveled with her for 3 years throughout Europe, where he came into contact with many new musical ideas. He served as the conductor of the French Theatre in Berlin from 1776 to 1780 and from 1780 to 1787 he was the Kapellmeister of Prince Henry in Rheinsberg. Schulz then went on to serve as Court Kapellmeister in Copenhagen from 1787 to 1795 before returning to Berlin. He died in Schwedt.

Schulz wrote operas, stage music, oratorios, and cantatas, as well as piano pieces and folk songs; he also wrote articles on music theory for Johann Georg Sulzer's (1720–1779) Allgemeine Theorie der schönen Künste in four volumes.

== Selected works ==
=== For piano ===
Her kommer, Jesus, dine små ("Here, Jesus, your little ones")
Performed on piano by Erik Damskier, text by Hans Adolph Brorson (0:24)

- Sechs Klavierstücke, Op. 1, 1778
- Sonata, Op. 2, 1778

=== Lieder ===
- Gesänge im Volkston, 1779
- Lieder im Volkston, 1782, 1785, 1790.
- Chansons Italiennes, 1782

=== Operas ===
- Clarissa, operetta, Berlin 1775
- La fée Urgèle, comédie avec ariettes, 1782
- Aline, reine de Golconde, Rheinsberg 1787
- Høstgildet, Syngespil, Copenhagen 1790
- Indtoget, Syngespil, Copenhagen 1793
- Peters bryllup, Syngespil, Copenhagen 1793

=== Incidental music ===
- Music for Athalie by Jean Racine, Rheinsberg 1785

=== Church music ===
- Maria und Johannes, 1788
- Kristi død, 1792
- Des Erlösers letzte Stunde, 1794
- 4 Hymns, 1791–1794

== Further media ==
Melody of Der Mond ist aufgegangen
Melody of Wir pflügen und wir streuen
