= Christoph von Schmid =

German writer (1768–1854)

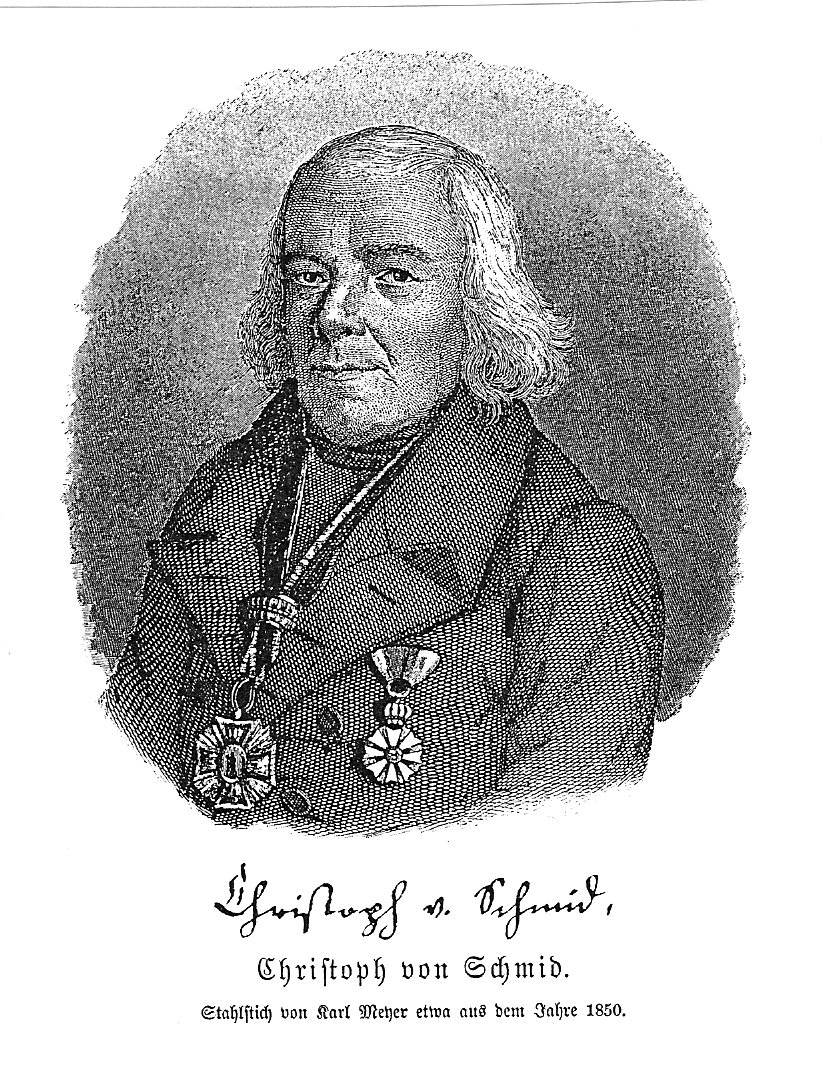
Christoph von Schmid (drawing from c. 1850).

Rosa von Tannenburg by Christoph von Schmid

Christoph von Schmid (15 August 1768 Dinkelsbühl, Bavaria – 3 September 1854 Augsburg) was a writer of children's stories and an educator. His stories were very popular and translated into many languages. His best known work in the English-speaking world is The Basket of Flowers (Das Blumenkörbchen). In this work, fifteen-year-old Mary is taught all the principles of godliness through the flowers planted and cared for by her father, James, who is the king's gardener. When she is falsely accused of stealing and temporarily banished, her friends try to find some evidence in order to prove that Mary didn't do anything wrong until it's too late. In recent years, The Basket of Flowers has been published in the United States as part of the Lamplighter Family Collection.

== Biography ==
Christoph von Schmid studied theology and was ordained priest in the Catholic Church in 1791. He then served as assistant in several parishes until 1796, when he was placed at the head of a large school in Thannhausen, where he taught for many years. From 1816 to 1826, he was parish priest at Oberstadion in Württemberg. In 1826, Christoph von Schmid was appointed canon of the Augsburg Cathedral, where he died of cholera at the age of eighty-seven.

Schmid began writing books for children, teaching Christian values, shortly after being placed at the school in Thannhausen. His first work was a Bible history for children (1801). Schmid's original purpose for writing was to reward his students after school by reading his books to them. Schmid continued with his calling as a writer of children's books throughout his long life.

Schmid's writings have been translated into 24 languages. His principal juvenile works are Biblische Geschichte für Kinder, Der Weihnachtsabend, Genovefa, Die Ostereier, Das Blumenkörbchen, and Erzählungen für Kinder und Kinderfreunde (1823–1829). Die Ostereier (Easter Eggs, 1816) became so popular that he started signing himself as "author of Easter Eggs." Many say that he was the pioneer of books for youths.

His stories usually center around a disturbance to the happiness of good people, which God's righteousness finally fixes, the goal of the writer being to awaken a practical piety in his youthful readers. He also wrote poems which are scattered here and there in his work.

His autobiography, Erinnerungen aus meinem Leben, was published in 1853–1857.
