= 1602 in Germany =

- Decades
- See also: Other events of 1602; History of Germany • Timeline • Years

Events from the year 1602 in Germany.

== Births ==
- Johannes Rulicius
- Rudolf Christian, Count of East Frisia
- Johann Hülsemann
- Christoph Köler
- Johann Sithmann

== Deaths ==
- Paulus Melissus
- Martin Ruland the Elder
- Thomas Schweicker
- Caspar Peucer
