= Lititz Moravian Historic District =

Historic district in Pennsylvania, United States

- U.S. National Register of Historic Places
- U.S. Historic district
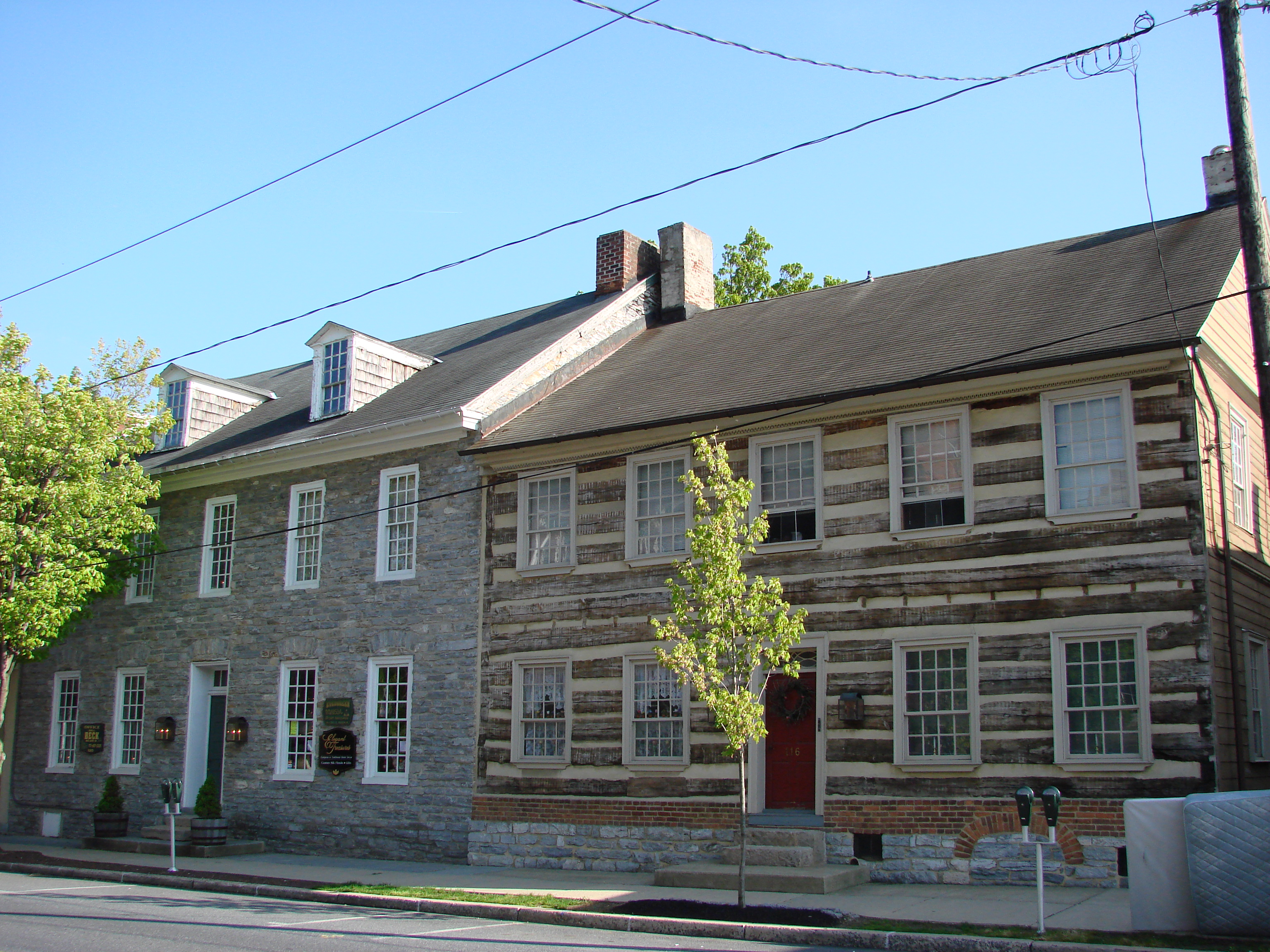
- Lititz Moravian Historic District, May 2008

- Location within Pennsylvania Location within the United States
- Location: Roughly bounded by E. Main, Willow and Locust, Marion and Orange, and S. Cedar and S. and N. Broad Sts., Lititz, Pennsylvania
- Coordinates: 40°09′17″N 76°18′06″W
- Area: 103.3 acres (41.8 ha)
- Built: c. 1755-c. 1930
- Architectural style: Early Commercial, Late Victorian, Federal
- NRHP reference No.: 86001030
- Added to NRHP: May 9, 1986

The Lititz Moravian Historic District is a national historic district that is located in Lititz, Lancaster County, Pennsylvania.

It was listed on the National Register of Historic Places in 1986.

== History and architectural features ==
This district includes 113 contributing buildings, one contributing site, and two contributing structures that are located in Lititz. It has notable examples of the Federal and Late Victorian architectural styles. The buildings date from roughly 1755 to 1930. Notable buildings include the Warden's House (c. 1757), Corpse House (Leichen Kappelchen) (1786), Werner House, Tinsley Cottage, Sisters' House (1758), Moravian Church (1787), Brothers' House (1759), Lititz National Bank, Commonwealth National Bank (1922), Mary Dixon Memorial Chapel (1884) on the campus of Linden Hall School, and the General Sutter Inn (originally the Zum Anker, established 1764).

The contributing site is the Moravian Church Cemetery, which was established in 1758 and contains the graves of General John Augustus Sutter, of California Gold Rush fame, and his wife Anna Dubeld Sutter, and Francis Florentine Hagen, composer of the beloved Christmas hymn "Morning Star, O Cheering Sight."

Also located in the district are the separately listed Congregational Store, Sturgis Pretzel House, and Johann Agust Sutter House.

== Gallery ==
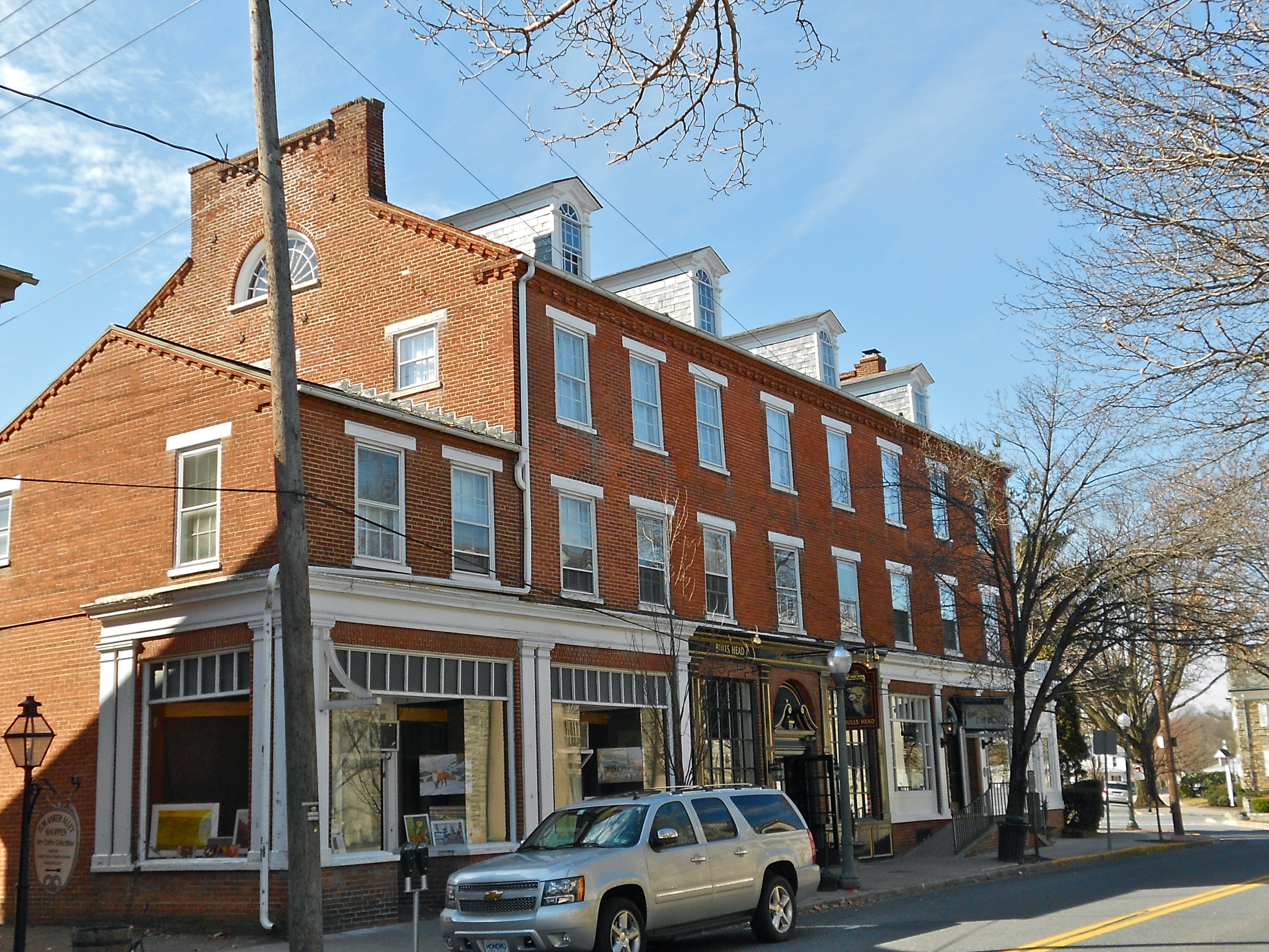
Sutter Inn

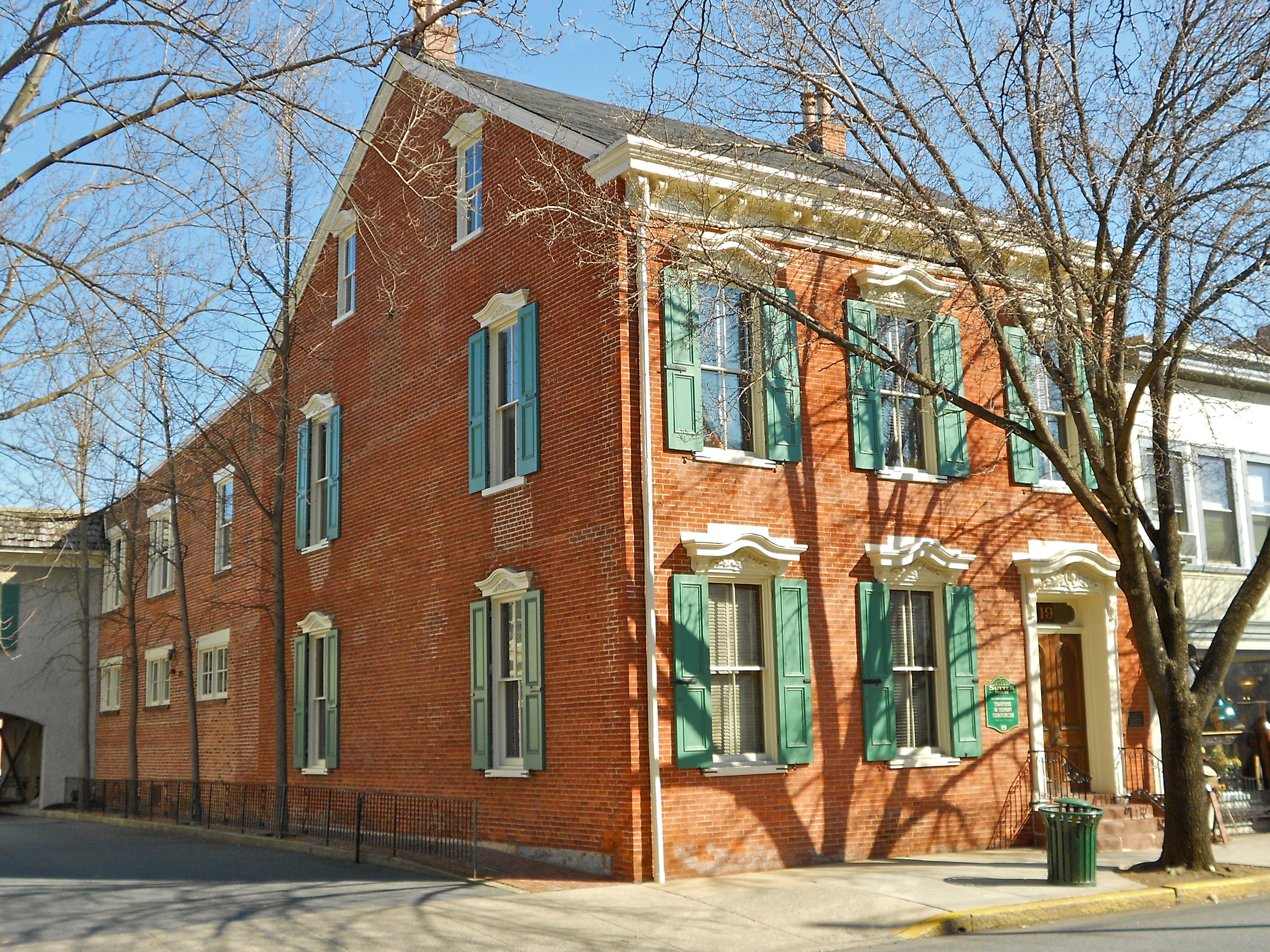
Sutter House

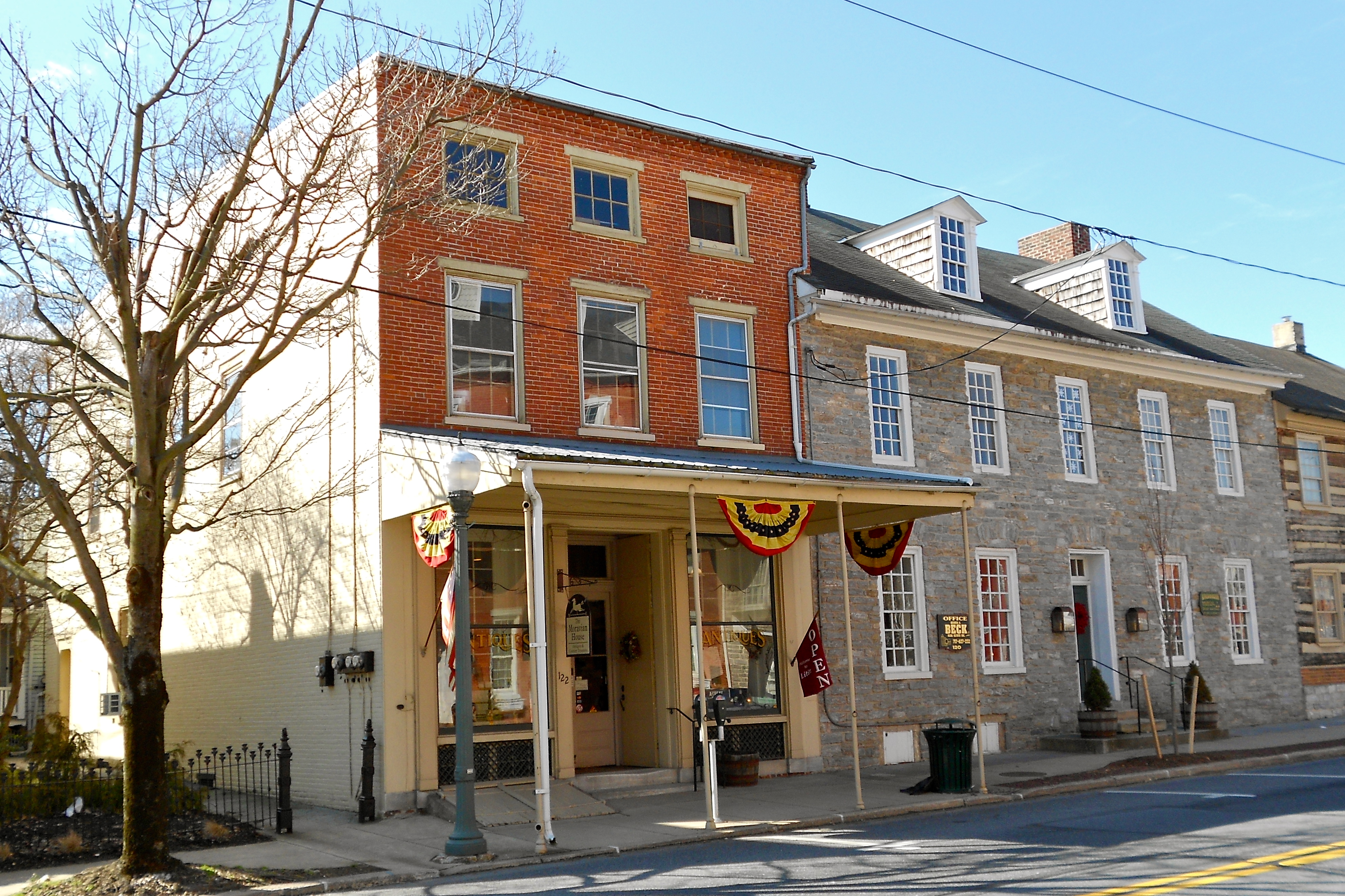
Congregational Store

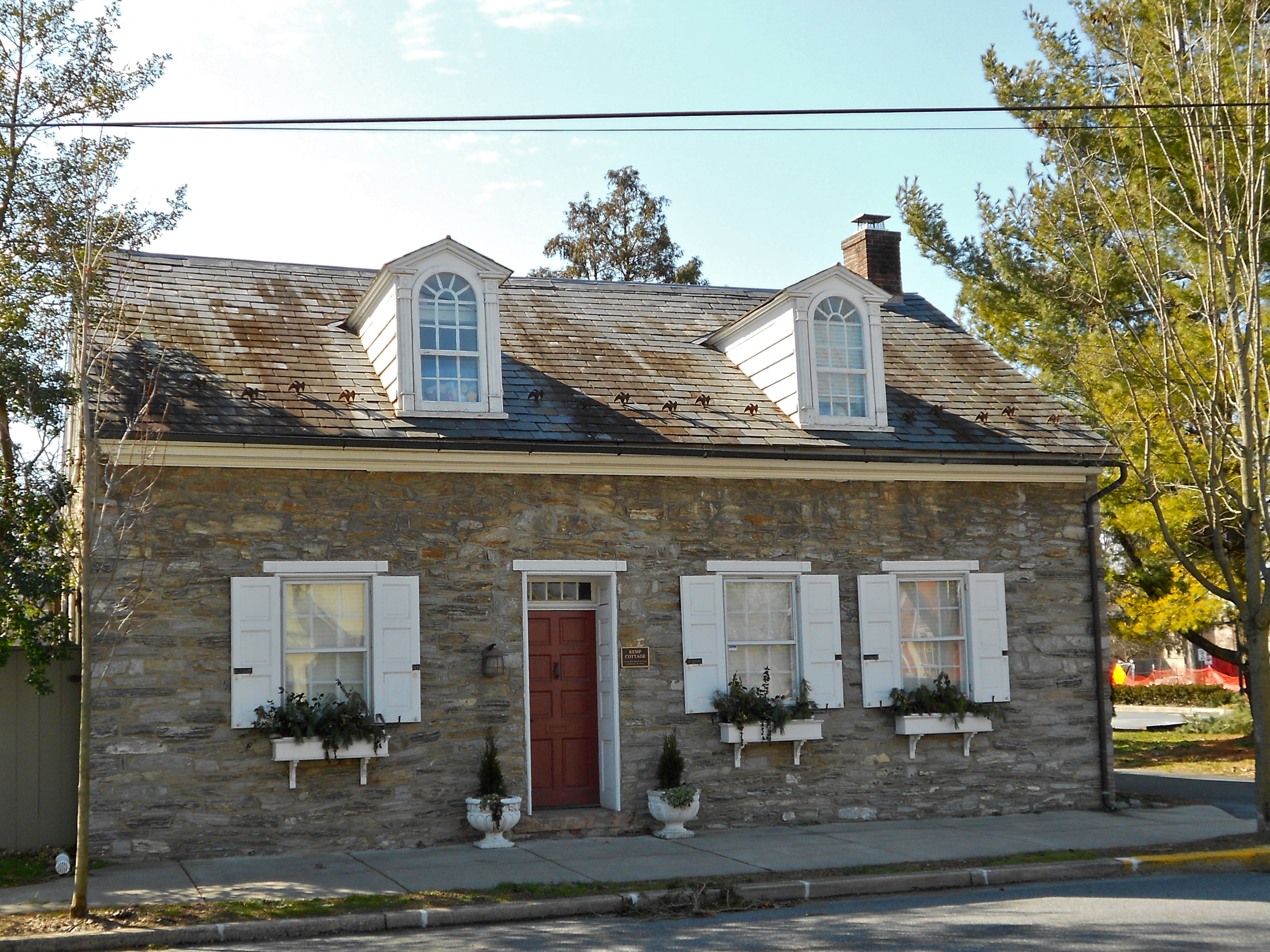
Kemp Cottage

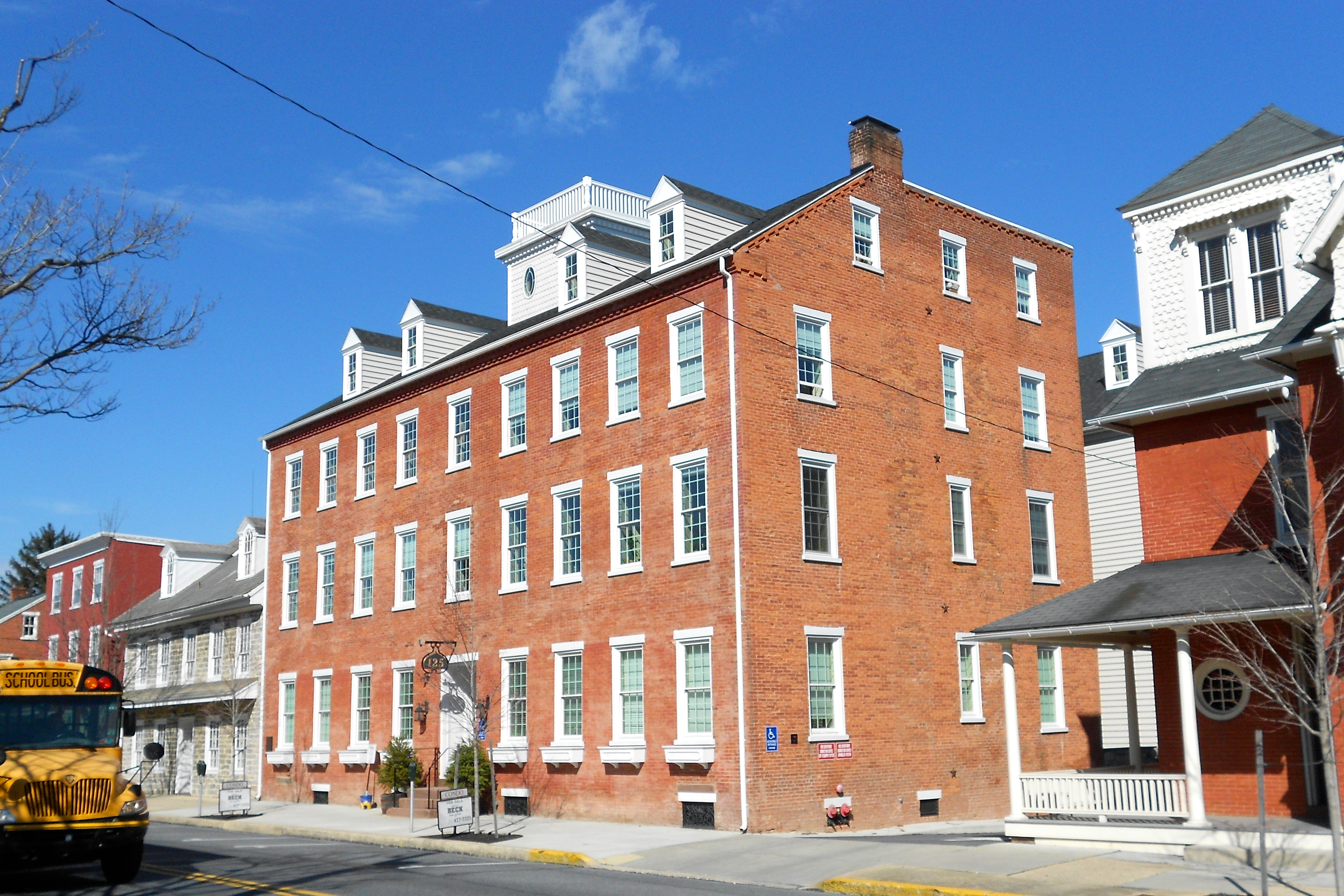
125 East Main

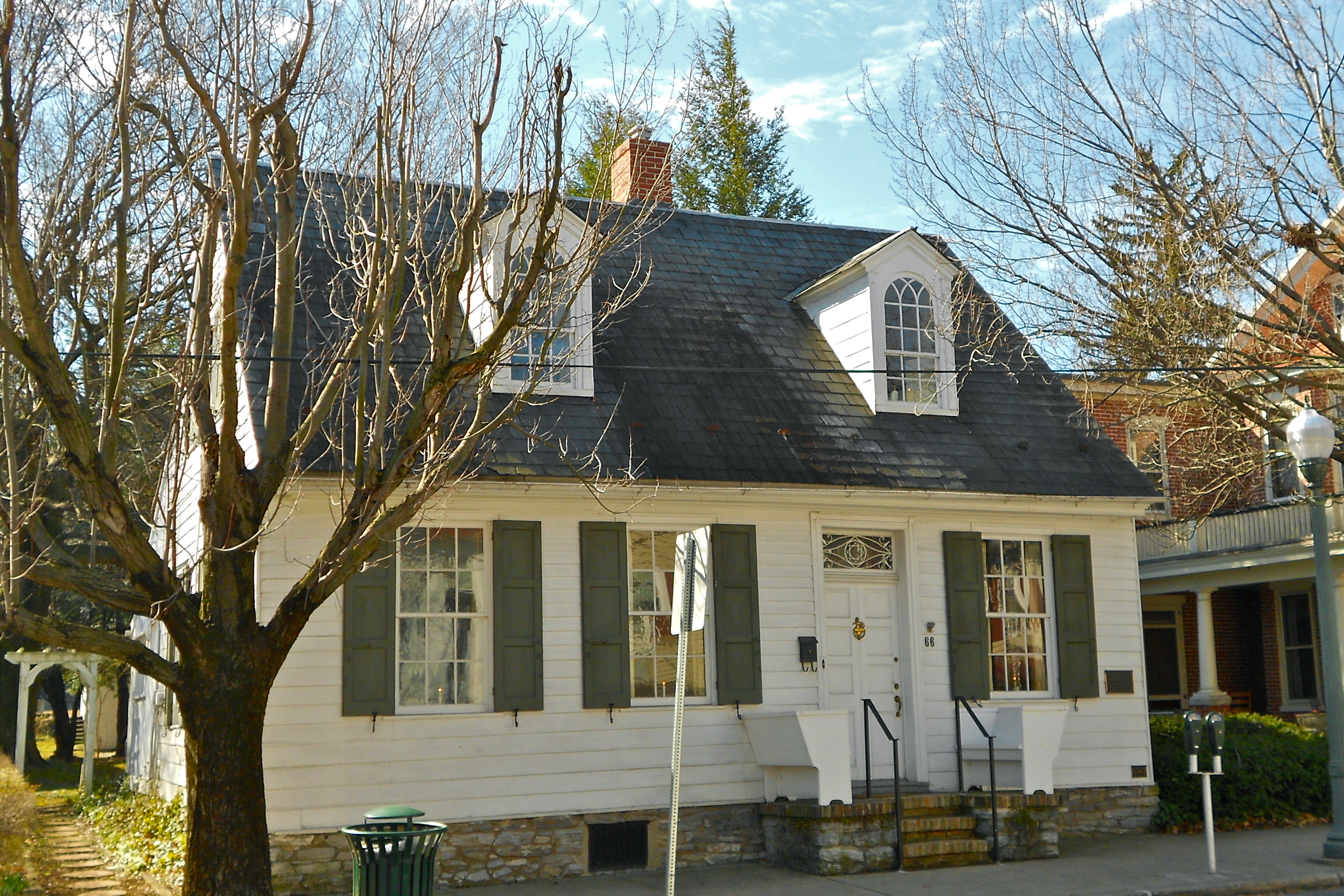
William Werner House
