= Köler =

Köler is a German occupational surname, which means "charcoal burner", from the Middle High German kol "(char)coal". Alternative spellings include Köhler, Koeler and Koler. Notable people with the surname include:

- Christoph Köler (1602–1658), German writer
- David Köler (1532–1565), German composer
- Johann Köler (1826–1899), Estonian painter

== See also ==
- Koehl
