= Georg Joseph =

German Baroque composer

- Born: c. 1620
- Died: c. 1668; Breslau
- Occupation: Composer
- Organizations: Diocese of Breslau

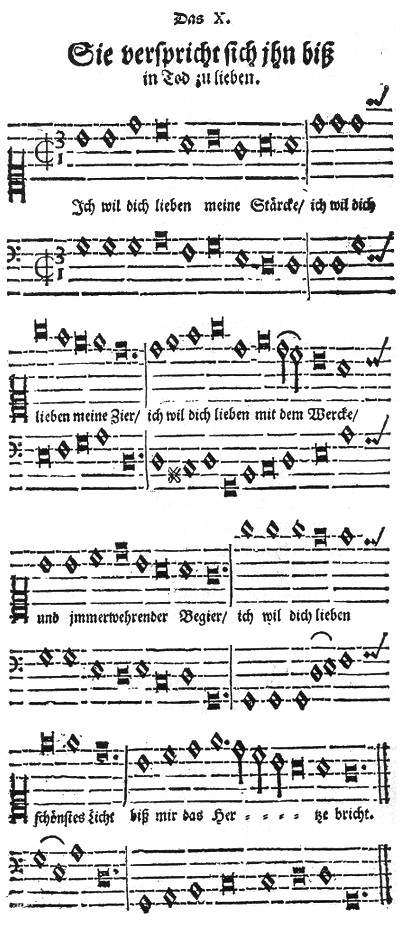
"Ich will dich lieben, meine Stärke", melody and bass by Joseph, in: Heilige Seelen-Lust, Breslau 1657

Georg Joseph (c. 1620 – c. 1668) was a German Baroque composer who served at the court of prince-bishop of Breslau. He was from 1657 to 1668 the musical collaborator of Johann Schefflers (Angelus Silesius) who published a collection of sacred songs titled Heilige Seelen-Lust oder geistliche Hirten-Lieder der in ihren Jesum verliebten Psyche, printed by the Baumannschen Drukkerey in 1657. (Note: The full title is: "Heilige Seelen-Lust, oder Geistliche Hirten-Lieder der in ihren Jesum verliebten Psyche gesungen von Johann Angelo Silesio, Und von Herren Georgio Josepho mit außbundig schönen Melodeyen geziert / Allen liebhabenden Seelen zur Ergetzligkeit und Vermehrung ihrer heiligen Liebe / zu Lob und Ehren Gottes an Tag gegeben") 184 of the 200 Melodies with a bass line were written by Joseph. They were expressive and used occasional melismas to interpret the text.

Several of Joseph's melodies to Scheffler's texts were reprinted in the Grüssauer Passionsbuch (Schmertzhaffter Lieb- und Creutz-Weeg), a book to reflect the Stations of the Cross at Grüssau Abbey, printed in 1682 by the abbot Bernhard Rosa.

Joseph's melodies to "Ich will dich lieben, meine Stärke" and "Morgenstern der finstern Nacht" are part of the Catholic hymnal Gotteslob, as GL 358 and GL 372.
