= Juan de los Ángeles =

Spanish priest and writer (1536–1609)

- Church: Roman Catholic Church

Personal details
- Born: Juan Martínez; 1536 Lagartera, Toldeo, Spain
- Died: 1609 (aged 72–73) Madrid, Spain

Juan de los Ángeles (born Juan Martínez; 1536 – 1609), was a Spanish priest and writer. He belonged to the Franciscan Order and was reported to have had a vast knowledge of the classics of antiquity.

== Biography ==
Juan de los Ángeles was born in 1536 in Lagartera, Toledo, Spain.

He died in 1609 in Madrid.

== Works ==
- Triunfos del amor de Dios, Medina del Campo 1590
- Sermón en las honras de la católica cesárea Magestad de la Emperatriz nuestra reina, del 17-III-1603, Madrid 1603.
- Salterio espiritual (1604)
- Presencia de Dios (1604).
- Tratado espiritual de los soberanos misterios de la misa, Madrid 1604.
- Consideraciones sobre los Cantares (1606)
- Tratado espiritual de cómo el alma ha de traer siempre a Dios delante de sí, Madrid 1607.
- Vergel espiritual del ánima religiosa..., Madrid 1610.
- Manual de vida perfecta (1608)
