= Mir nach, spricht Christus, unser Held =

17th century German hymn

- Christian hymn
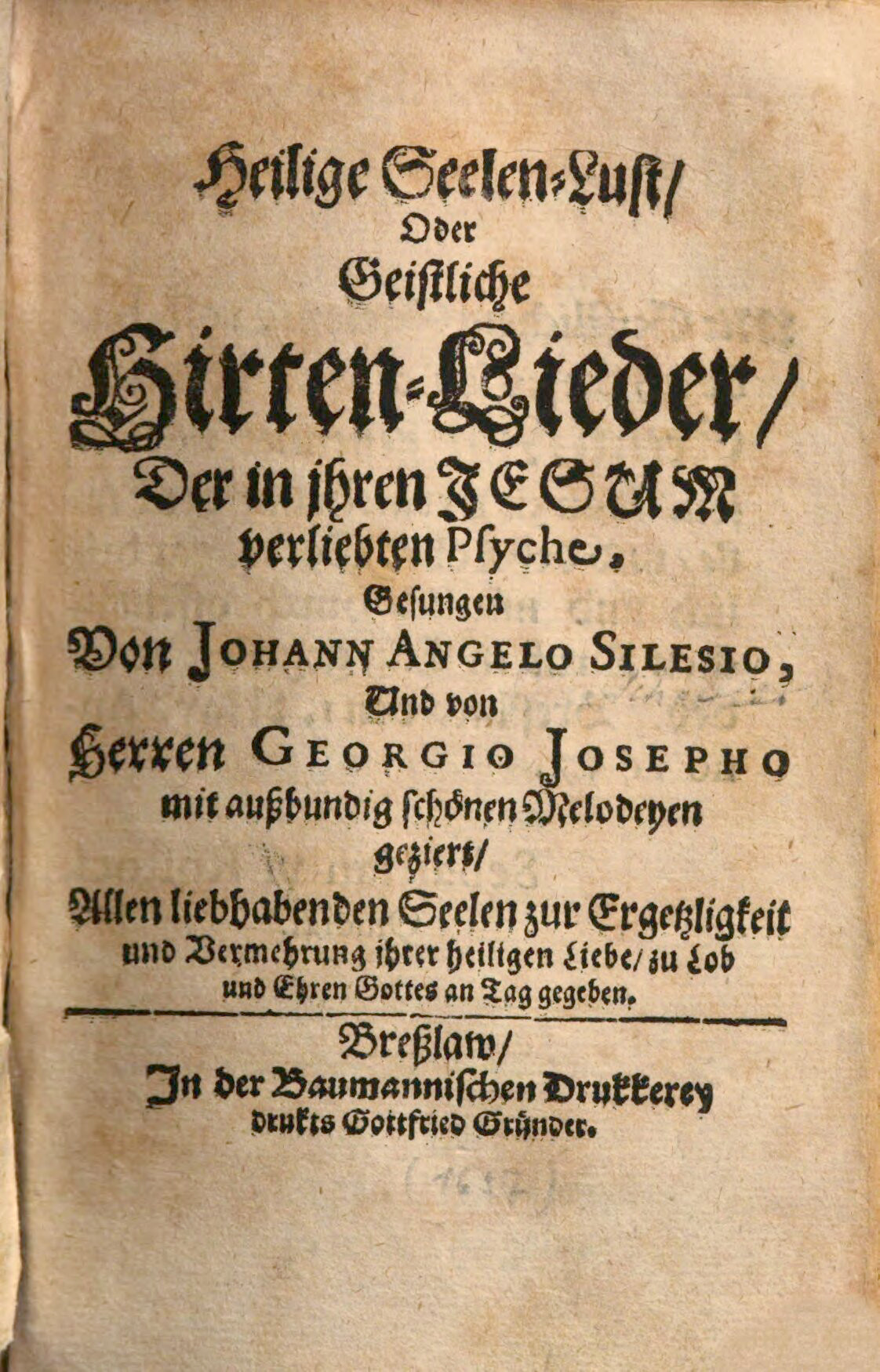
- Title page of Heilige Seelen-Lust, 1657 edition
- Text: by Angelus Silesius
- Language: German
- Melody: by Bartholomäus Gesius, revised by
- Composed: 1605
- Published: 1668

"Mir nach, spricht Christus, unser Held" (Follow me, says Christ, our hero) is a Christian hymn in German with a text by Angelus Silesius written in 1668. It is based on sayings of Jesus, used in direct speech. It became assigned to a 1605 tune by Bartholomäus Gesius in the revision by Johann Hermann Schein.

Although the poet had left the Protestant church, the song was used continually there, but was introduced for Catholicism only in 1938, in the collection Kirchenlied. In appears in common hymnals in German of both Protestants and Catholics.

== History ==
The text of "Mir nach, spricht Christus, unser Held" was written by Johannes Scheffler, known as Angelus Silesius, in 1668. It deals with the call of Jesus to his disciples to follow him. He first published it in 1668 in the fifth volume of his collection Heilige Seelen-Lust (The Soul's holy delight). A melody with a figured bass was composed by Georg Joseph from Breslau. In 1695 the text was assigned to be sung to the melody of "Machs mit mir, Gott, nach deiner Güt", first composed by Bartholomäus Gesius in 1605, and adapted by Johann Hermann Schein in 1628. This melody is retained in modern publications, while several other arias setting the text in the early 18th century failed to become popular.

Although Silesius had left the Protestant church, his song was first popular there, used continually from the Baroque period until the present time. In the Catholic Church, the hymn was introduced with the 1938 publication of the collection Kirchenlied. It is part of the common Protestant hymnal in German, Evangelisches Gesangbuch as EG 385 and of the 2013 Catholic hymnal Gotteslob as GL 461. The hymn also appears in many songbooks.

== Content ==
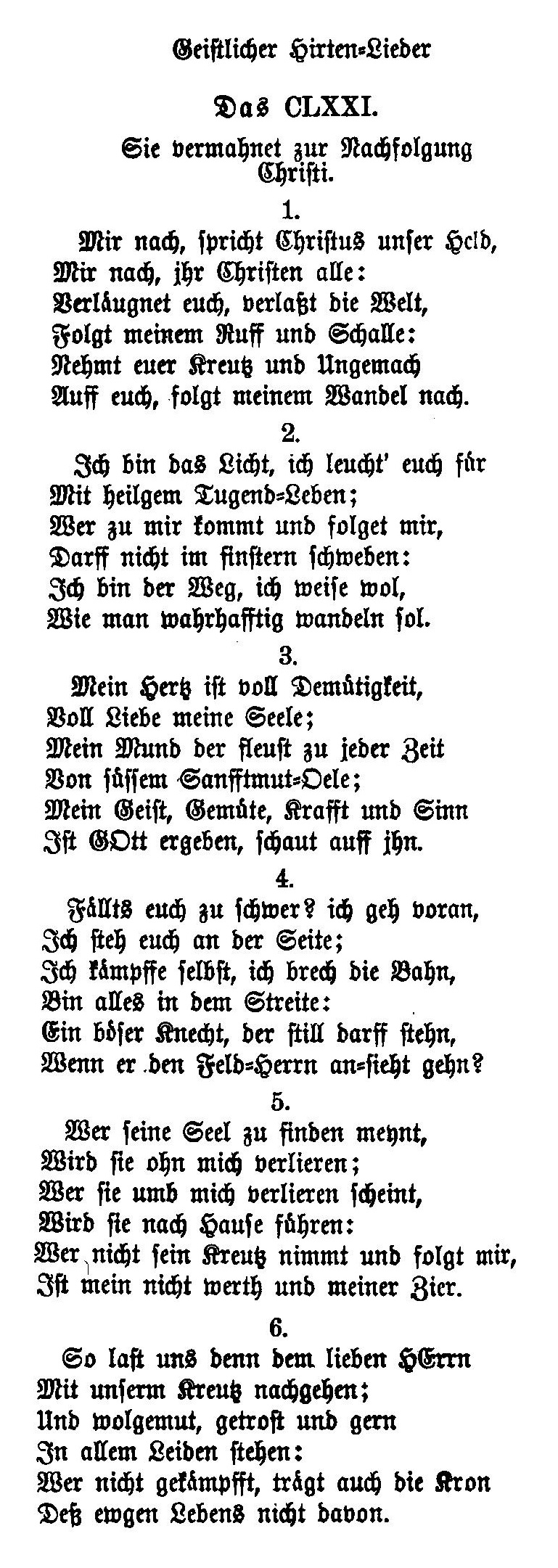
Original text in a 1901 reprint

The main topic of "Mir nach, spricht Christus, unser Held" is following Christ (imitatio Christi) in carrying the Cross, based on sayings of Jesus in the Gospel of Matthew, speaking about the Cross (Matthew 10:38 and 16:24), and in the Gospel of John, about the "light of the world" (John 8:12). Another topic is the militia Christi, fight of Christ, meaning a spiritual fight, not violence. The sayings of Jesus are rendered as direct speech in stanzas 1 to 5. In the final stanza 6, the singers express a willingness to follow Jesus.

== Tune ==
The first musical setting of the text was composed, like the other hymns in the collection, by Georg Joseph from Breslau, who created an arioso melody with figured bass. It was replaced in 1695 by a tune for "Machs mit mir, Gott, nach deiner Güt", that Bartholomäus Gesius had written in 1605 and that had been revised by Johann Hermann Schein. It has remained in use in modern hymnals, although several other melodies were composed in the early 18th century.

This tune, often attributed to Schein alone, appears in works by Johann Sebastian Bach, most prominently with the words "Durch dein Gefängnis, Gottes Sohn" (By your prison, Son of God) in the St John Passion. In Anglophone hymnology, it is called EISENACH.
