= 1601 in Germany =

- Decades
- See also: Other events of 1601; History of Germany • Timeline • Years

Events from the year 1601 in Germany.

== Births ==
- Simon Peter Tilemann
- Johann Michael Moscherosch
- Andreas Reyher
- Dorothea of Saxe-Altenburg
- Justus Gesenius
- Mathias Czwiczek

== Deaths ==
- Peter Thyraeus
- Nikolaus Krell
- Leonhardt Schröter
- Gebhard Truchsess von Waldburg
