= Morgenstern der finstern Nacht =

1657 Christian poem in German by Angelus Silesius

- Christian hymn
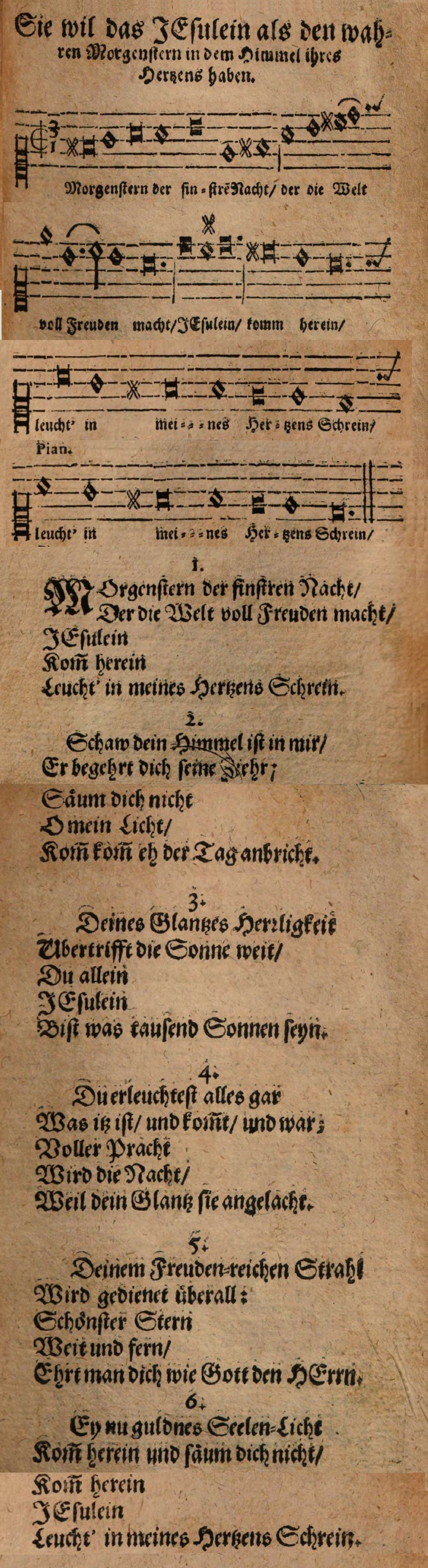
- The hymn in Heilige Seelen-Lust, Breslau, 1657
- English: "Morning Star, O cheering sight!"
- Text: Angelus Silesius
- Language: German
- Melody: Georg Joseph
- Published: 1657

"Morgenstern der finstern Nacht" (literally: Morning star of the dark night) is a Christian poem in German by Angelus Silesius, first published in his poetry collection Heilige Seelen-Lust in 1657. It became a hymn with a melody written for it by Georg Joseph the same year. It is part of the 2013 German Catholic hymnal Gotteslob as GL 372, in the section "Jesus Christus". It has also been used for Advent. A common version in English, "Morning Star, O cheering sight!", was written by Bennett Harvey.

== History ==
Silesius first published "Morgenstern der finstern Nacht" as part of his collection Heilige Seelen-Lust in 1657. The full title of the collection is: "Heilige Seelen-Lust, oder Geistliche Hirten-Lieder der in ihren Jesum verliebten Psyche gesungen von Johann Angelo Silesio, Und von Herren Georgio Josepho mit außbundig schönen Melodeyen geziert / Allen liebhabenden Seelen zur Ergetzligkeit und Vermehrung ihrer heiligen Liebe / zu Lob und Ehren Gottes an Tag gegeben" [Saintly Soul-Pleasure, or Spiritual Pastoral Songs, of the Soul that loveth Jesus, sung by Johann Angelus Silesius, and ornamented by Master George Joseph with wonderfully lovely Melodies. To all charitable Souls for the Satisfaction and Increase of their holy Love / to the Praise and Honour of God presented.]

It is part of the 2013 German Catholic hymnal Gotteslob as GL 372, in the section "Leben in Gott / Jesus Christus" (life in God / Jesus Christ).

== Text ==
The 26th song in the collection, it is introduced, speaking of the soul: "Sie will das Jesulein als den wahren Morgenstern in dem Himmel ihres Herzens haben" (She wants to have the little Jesus as the true morning star in the heaven of her soul). The poem is in six stanzas of five lines each. It is written as trochaic, rhyming AABB. The third and fourth lines are half the length of the others, giving extra weight to the fifth line, which is used as a summary. The image of the morning star is a mythical spiritual image which in Christianity is often used for Jesus, also in Nicolai's hymn "Wie schön leuchtet der Morgenstern". The text is given as in GL 372, juxtaposed with a common version in English by Bennett Harvey, which is shortened to four stanzas:

German

German
1. Morgenstern der finstern Nacht,
der die Welt voll Freuden macht,
Jesu mein,
komm herein,
leucht in meines Herzens Schrein.

2. Schau, dein Himmel ist in mir,
er begehrt dich, seine Zier.
Säume nicht,
o mein Licht,
komm, komm, eh der Tag anbricht.

3. Deines Glanzes Herrlichkeit
übertrifft die Sonne weit;
du allein,
Jesu mein,
bist, was tausend Sonnen sein.

4. Du erleuchtest alles gar,
was jetzt ist und kommt und war;
voller Pracht
wird die Nacht,
weil dein Glanz sie angelacht.

5. Deinem freudenreichen Strahl
wird gedienet überall;
schönster Stern,
weit und fern
ehrt man dich als Gott den Herrn.

6. Eil nun, güldnes Seelenlicht,
komm herein und säume nicht.
Komm herein,
Jesu mein,
leucht in meines Herzens Schrein.

English

1. Morning Star, O cheering sight!
Ere thou cam’st, how dark earth’s night!
Jesus mine,
in me shine;
fill my heart with light divine.

2. Morning Star, thy glory bright
far excels the sun’s clear light.
Jesus be,
constantly,
more than thousand suns to me.

3. Thy glad beams, thou Morning Star,
cheer the nations near and far.
Thee we own,
Lord alone,
our dear Savior, God’s dear Son.

4. Morning Star, my soul’s true light,
tarry not, dispel my night.
Jesus mine,
in me shine;
fill my heart with light divine.

It differs slightly from the original, which has "Jesulein" (little Jesus) instead of "Jesu mein" (my Jesus) three times, and the older "säum dich nicht" instead of "säume nicht" twice. Jesus is addressed in the second person with an intimate "Du" as the morning star, which shines while darkness prevails. Night turns to brightness when his radiance has smiled at it ("weil dein Glanz sie angelacht").

== Melodies and musical settings ==
The melody in triple meter was written by Georg Joseph, a composer from Breslau.

Gabriel Rheinberger composed his own melody for the poem in 1884 and wrote a four-part setting of that melody which was published in 1900. Carus-Verlag re-published both in 2014.
