= Heut triumphieret Gottes Sohn =

Lutheran Easter hymn

- Lutheran chorale by Bartholomäus Gesius
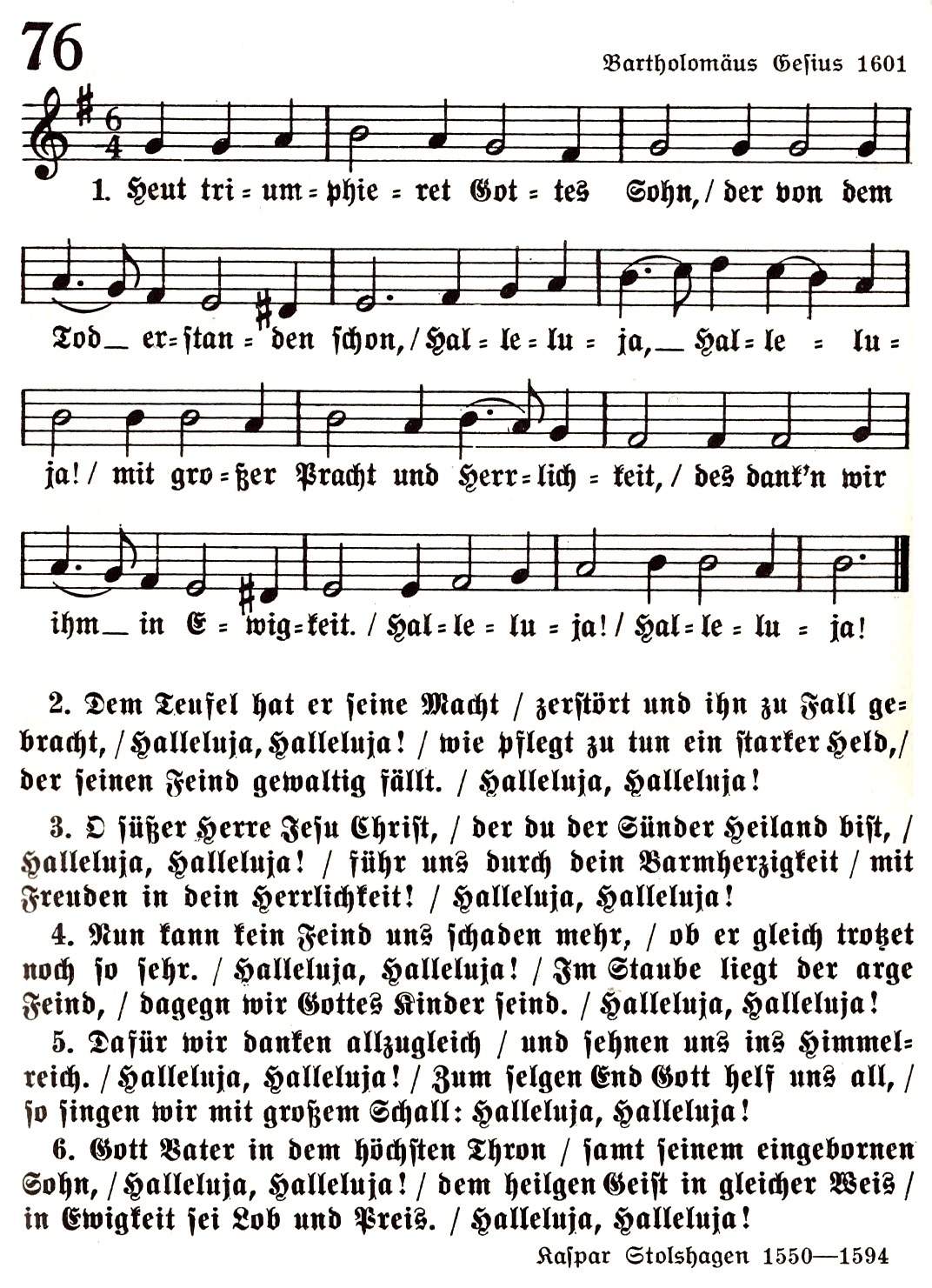
- The hymn in a 1932 publication
- English: "This Day in Triumph God the Son"
- Catalogue: Zahn 2585
- Genre: Lutheran hymn
- Occasion: Easter
- Text: attr. to Kaspar Stolzhagen
- Language: German
- Meter: 8.8.8. 8.8.8.
- Published: 1592 (text); 1601 (tune)
- Scoring: SSATB

MIDI renderings:
Heut triumphieret Gottes Sohn
hymn tune (EG 109)

Heut triumphieret Gottes Sohn, BWV 630
Bach's chorale prelude

"Heut triumphieret Gottes Sohn" ("This Day in Triumph God the Son") is a Lutheran hymn for Easter. Kaspar Stolzhagen published the hymn in 1592, and its setting by Bartholomäus Gesius (Zahn No. 2585) was published in 1601. The hymn was adopted in several hymnals, including the Evangelisches Gesangbuch. Composers such as Johann Sebastian Bach based compositions on its hymn tune.

== History ==
Although hymnologists sometimes doubt his authorship, Stolzhagen (1550–1594) would have written "Heut triumphieret Gottes Sohn" in 1591. In 1592, Stolzhagen published the text as an Easter hymn (German: "Lied von der Auferstehung Christi", "song of the resurrection of Christ"). Gesius's setting of the hymn (Zahn No. 2585) appeared in two independent publications in 1601, indicating that its dissemination, and composition, dated from some time before it was printed.

== Hymn ==
In its original publication, Stolzhagen's Easter hymn had sixteen stanzas of three lines. This version with three-line stanzas was possibly sung to the "Resurrexit Dominus" tune, Zahn No. 25a. In 1601, Gesius published a five-part setting (SSATB) of the hymn in the section about Easter of his Geistliche Deutsche Lieder (German spiritual songs). In his publication the hymn had six stanzas of six lines, derived from Stolzhagen's text. After Gesius, the hymn was mostly published in six-line stanzas. "Halleluja, Halleluja" is the text of every third line. In Gesius's setting, the melody rises on every first mentioning of Halleluja.

== Musical settings ==
From the 17th to the 19th century, the hymn was included in dozens of hymnals. Johann Hermann Schein published a six-part setting with seven stanzas, based on Gesius's hymn tune, in his 1627 Cantional, a setting which was republished by Gottfried Vopelius in 1682. Cantatas based on the hymn were written by Dieterich Buxtehude (BuxWV 43, setting the text of the first stanza) and Christoph Graupner (GWV 1129/15). Bach wrote a chorale prelude BWV 630 as part of the Easter section of his Orgelbüchlein; and a four-part chorale (BWV 342, in 3/4 time) based on the hymn tune. The hymn was adopted as No. 109 in the German Protestant hymnal Evangelisches Gesangbuch, in 6/4 time.

== Sources ==
- Brunken, Otto (2017). Brüggemann, Theodor (ed.). Handbuch zur Kinder- und Jugendliteratur: Von 1570 bis 1750 (in German). Springer-Verlag. ISBN 9783476032379.
- Dürr, Alfred; Kobayashi, Yoshitake, eds. (1998). Bach Werke Verzeichnis: Kleine Ausgabe – Nach der von Wolfgang Schmieder vorgelegten 2. Ausgabe [Bach Works Catalogue: Small Edition – After Wolfgang Schmieder's 2nd edition] (in German). Kirsten Beißwenger (collaborator). (BWV^{2a} ed.). Wiesbaden: Breitkopf & Härtel. ISBN 9783765102493. Preface in English and German.
- Gesius, Bartholomäus (1601). "Von der Aufferstehung Jesu Christi" [On the resurrection of Jesus Christ]. Geistliche Deutsche Lieder. D. Mart. Lutheri: Vnd anderer frommen Christen : welche durchs gantze Jahr in der christlichen Kirchen zu singen gebreuchlich, mit vier und fünff Stimmen nach gewönlicher Choralmelodien richtig und lieblich gesetzet; Mit einem nützlichen Register wie sie auff jedes Fest und Sontagen durchs gantze Jahr zu singen (in German). Frankfurt an der Oder: Johann Hartmann. pp. 35r–42r.
- Hiemke, Sven, ed. (2011). Orgelbüchlein (in German and English). Vol. 7. Breitkopf & Härtel. ISMN 979-0-004-18376-2. EB 8807. Johann Sebastian Bach: Complete Organ Works – Urtext
- Nieke, Erdmute (2008). Religiöse Bilderbogen aus Neuruppin: eine Untersuchung zur Frömmigkeit im 19. Jahrhundert. Europäische Hochschulschriften: Theologie (in German). Vol. 865. Peter Lang. ISBN 9783631571569. ISSN 0721-3409.
- Völker, Alexander (2001). "109 Heut triumphieret Gottes Sohn". In Hahn, Gerhard (ed.). Liederkunde zum Evangelischen Gesangbuch (in German). Vandenhoeck & Ruprecht. pp. 63–67. ISBN 3-525-50324-5.
- Zahn, Johannes (1889). Die Melodien der deutschen evangelischen Kirchenlieder (in German). Vol. I. Gütersloh: Bertelsmann.
- Zahn, Johannes (1890). Die Melodien der deutschen evangelischen Kirchenlieder (in German). Vol. II. Gütersloh: Bertelsmann.
