= Bartholomäus Gesius =

German theologian and musician (1562–1613)

- Born: c. 1562; Müncheberg
- Died: 1613 (aged 50–51); Frankfurt
- Other names: Göß; Gese
- Occupations: Theologian; Church musician; Composer; Hymn writer

Bartholomäus Gesius (also: Göß, Gese, c. 1562 – 1613) was a German theologian, church musician, composer and hymn writer. He worked at Schloss Muskau and in Frankfurt (Oder) and is known for choral Passions in German and Latin and for the melody and first setting of the Easter hymn "Heut triumphieret Gottes Sohn", which was used in several compositions including a cantata by Dieterich Buxtehude and a chorale prelude by Johann Sebastian Bach (BWV 630), concluding the Easter section of his Orgelbüchlein.

== Life ==
Born in Müncheberg, Gesius studied theology between 1578 and 1585 at the Alma Mater Viadrina in Frankfurt (Oder). He worked from 1582 as Kantor (church musician) in Müncheberg and from 1587 as teacher and musician at Schloss Muskau (now a World Heritage Site). In 1588, he began to compose a Passion after the Gospel of John in German, a St John Passion for five-part chorus. In spring of 1593, Gesius became Kantor at the Marienkirche, Frankfurt (Oder) and at the same time teacher at the Ratsschule, today the Karl-Liebknecht-Gymnasium. In 1613, he composed a six-part St Matthew Passion in Latin. He died the same year in Frankfurt (Oder) from the plague.

== Hymns ==
Gesius composed melody and setting of "Heut triumphieret Gottes Sohn". He wrote a melody for "Machs mit mir, Gott, nach deiner Güt" in 1605, which was adapted for "Mir nach, spricht Christus, unser Held" by Johann Hermann Schein.

== Selected works ==
- Historia vom Leiden und Sterben unsers Herren und Heilandes Jesu Christi wie sie uns der Evangelista Johannes im 18 und 19 Cap. beschrieben mit 2. 3. 4. und 5. Stimmen, Wittenberg: Welack, 1588
- Hymni quinque vocum de praecipuis festis anniversariis, Wittenberg: Hartmann, 1595
- Novae melodiae harmonicis quinque vocum numeris concinnatae, Frankfurt an der Oder: Hartmann, 1596
- Hymni scholastici per duodecim modos musicos quatuor vocum contrapuncto ornati, Frankfurt an der Oder: Eichorn, 1597
- Vierstimmiges Handbüchlein, Frankfurt an der Oder: Hartmann, 1597
- Der Lobgesang Mariae (Meine Seel erhebt den Herren, Herr Gott dich loben wir) und andere geistliche Lieder, Frankfurt an der Oder: Eichorn, 1598
- Psalmodia choralis, Frankfurt an der Oder: Hartmann, 1600
- Geistliche Deutsche Lieder D. Mart. Lutheri: Und anderer frommen Christen: Welche durchs gantze Jahr in der Christlichen Kirchen zusingen gebreuchlich mit vier und fünff Stimmen …, Frankfurt an der Oder: Hartmann, 1601
- Enchiridium etlicher deutscher und lateinischer Gesänge, Frankfurt an der Oder: Hartman, 1603
- Christliche Hauß und Tisch Musica, Wittenberg: Helwig, 1605
- Ein ander new Opus Geistlicher Deutscher Lieder D. Mart.Lutheri: Nicolai Hermanni, und anderer frommen Christen abgetheilt in zwo Theile, Frankfurt an der Oder: Hartman, 1605.
- Melodiae scholasticae sub horarum intervallis decantandae, cum cantionibus Gregorianis, Frankfurt an der Oder: Hartmann, 1609
- Hymni Patrum Cum Canticis Sacris, Latinis Et Germanicis, De Praecipuis Festis Anniversariis: Quibus Additi Suntet Hymni Scholastici Ad Duodecim Modos Musicos in utroq[ue] cantu, Regulari scilicet ac Transposito, singulis horis per totam septimanam decantandi, cum cantionibus Gregorianis, Frankfurt an der Oder: Hartman, 1609
- Cantiones sacrae chorales, Frankfurt an der Oder: Hartmann, 1610
- Missae ad imitationem cantionum Orlandi, et aliorum probatissimorum musicorum, Frankfurt an der Oder: Hartmann, 1611

== Literature ==
- Paul Blumenthal: Der Kantor Bartholomäus Gesius zu Frankfurt-Oder Frankfurt/Oder: Vogel & Neuber 1926 (Frankfurt und die Ostmark; vol. 1)
- Siegfried Gissel: Untersuchungen zur mehrstimmigen protestantischen Hymnenkomposition in Deutschland um 1600. Kassel; Basel; London: Bärenreiter (University of Marburg dissertation) 1980 ISBN 3-7618-0722-8
- Heinrich Grimm (1964). "Gesius, Bartholomäus". Neue Deutsche Biographie (in German). Vol. 6. Berlin: Duncker & Humblot. pp. 341–342. (full text online).
- Friedrich Wilhelm Schönherr: Bartholomaeus Gesius (Munchbergensis ca. 1560–1613): Ein Beitrag zur Musikgeschichte der Stadt Frankfurt a/O. im 16. Jahrhundert. Leipzig, Phil. Diss., 1920
- Rudolf Schwarze (1879). "Gesius, Bartholomäus" . Allgemeine Deutsche Biographie (in German). Vol. 9. Leipzig: Duncker & Humblot. pp. 93–90.
