= William Werner House =

Historic house in Pennsylvania, United States

- U.S. National Register of Historic Places
- U.S. Historic district – Contributing property
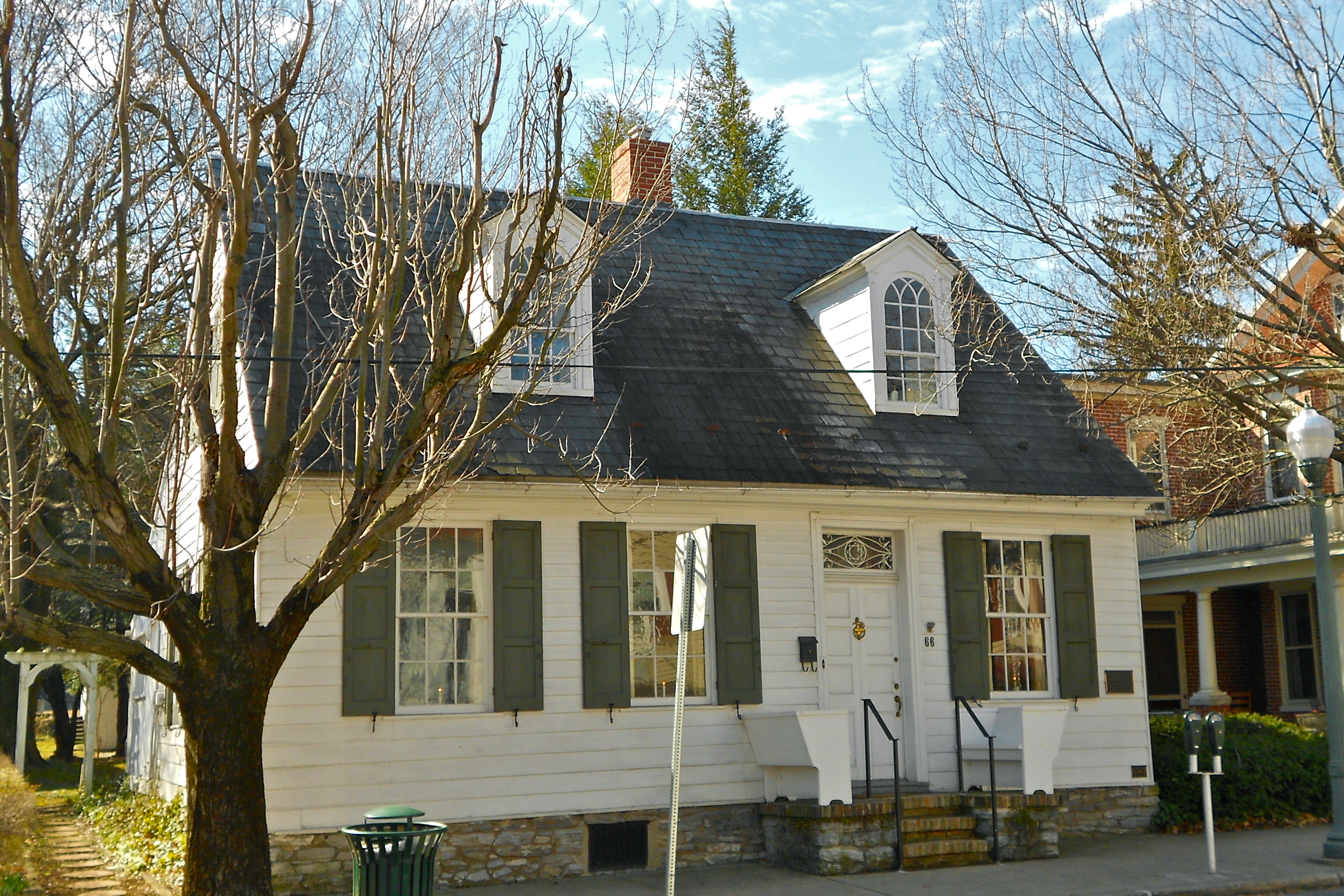
- William Werner House, February 2012

- Location within Pennsylvania Location within the United States
- Location: 66 E. Main St., Lititz, Pennsylvania
- Coordinates: 40°9′24″N 76°18′19″W
- Area: 0.5 acres (0.20 ha)
- Built: 1762
- Architectural style: Georgian
- NRHP reference No.: 84003451
- Added to NRHP: May 10, 1984

The William Werner House is an historic home that is located in Lititz, Lancaster County, Pennsylvania, United States.

Part of the Lititz Moravian Historic District, it was listed on the National Register of Historic Places in 1984.

== History and architectural features ==
Built in 1762, this historic structure is a 1 1/2-story, four-bay, frame dwelling that sits on a stone foundation. It has a steep gable roof, was designed in the Georgian style, and measures thirty feet wide by thirty-six feet deep. A rear addition and two front dormers were added in 1849.
