= Ich will dich lieben, meine Stärke =

1657 sacred poem by Johann Scheffler

- Christian hymns
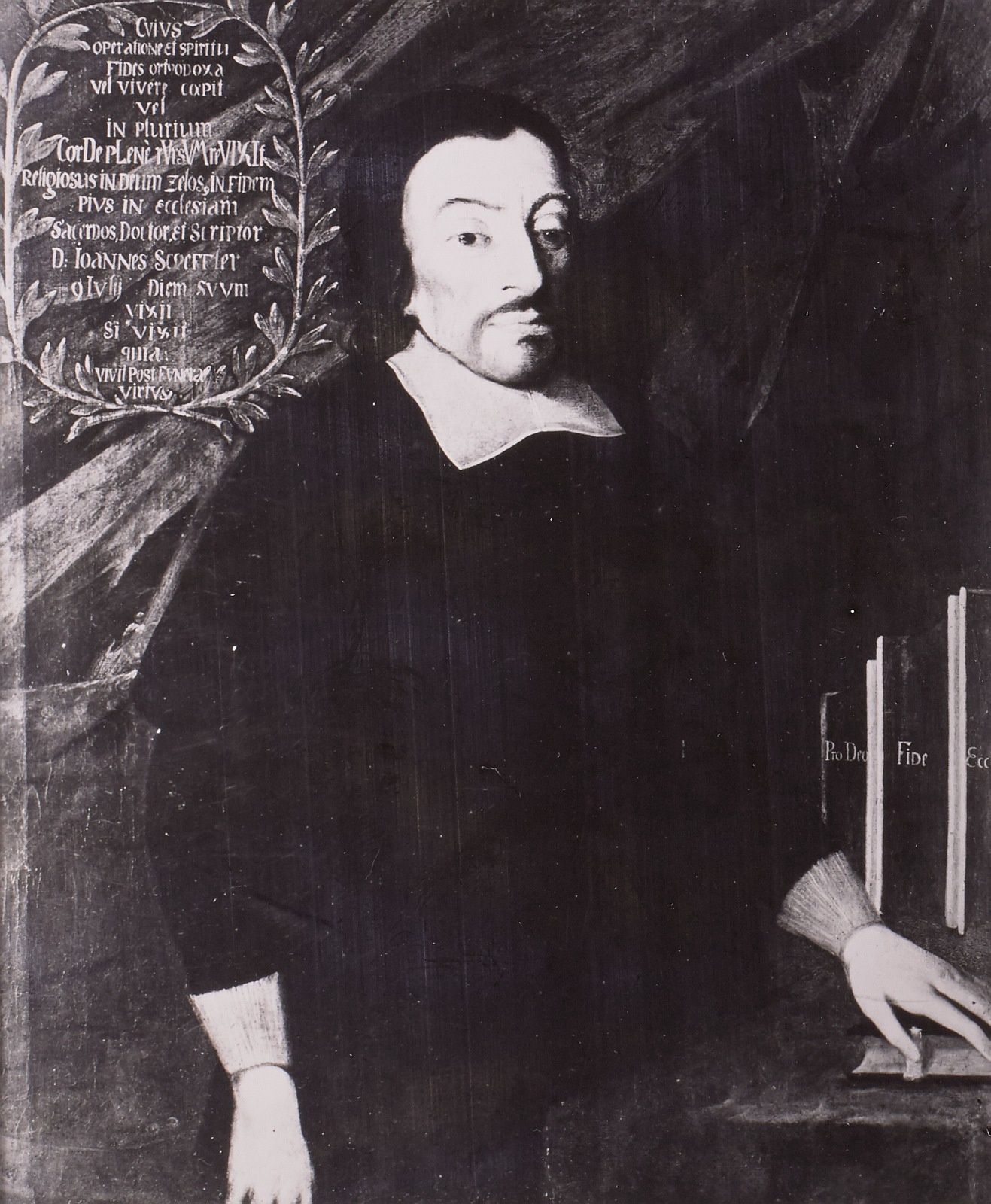
- The hymnwriter in 1668
- English: I want to love you, my strength
- Text: by Angelus Silesius
- Language: German
- Melody: by Georg Joseph; by Johann Balthasar König
- Published: 1657

"Ich will dich lieben, meine Stärke" (I want to love you, my strength) is a sacred poem by Johann Scheffler who is known by his pen name Angelus Silesius. It appeared first in a poem collection, Heilige Seelen-Lust (Holy bliss of the soul) in 1657, and has become a Christian song in notable hymnals of different denominations, with different melodies.

== Text ==
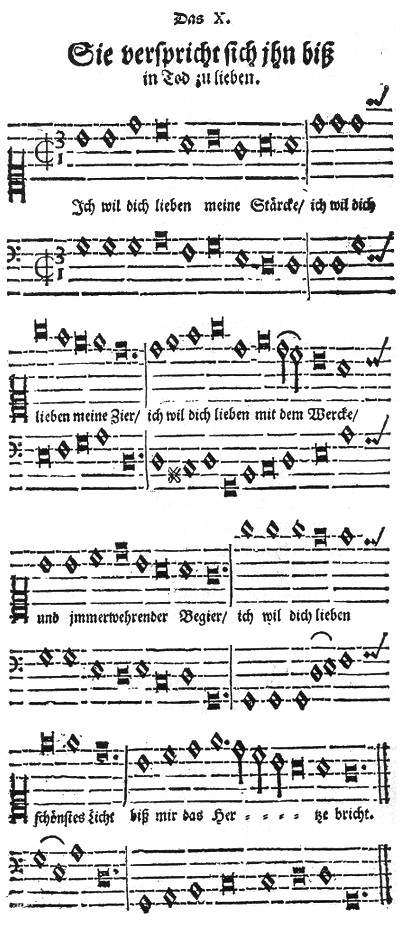
The hymn, with melody and bass by Georg Joseph, in the collection Heilige Seelen-Lust Oder geistliche Hirten-Lieder Der in ihren JESUM verliebten Psyche, Breslau 1668

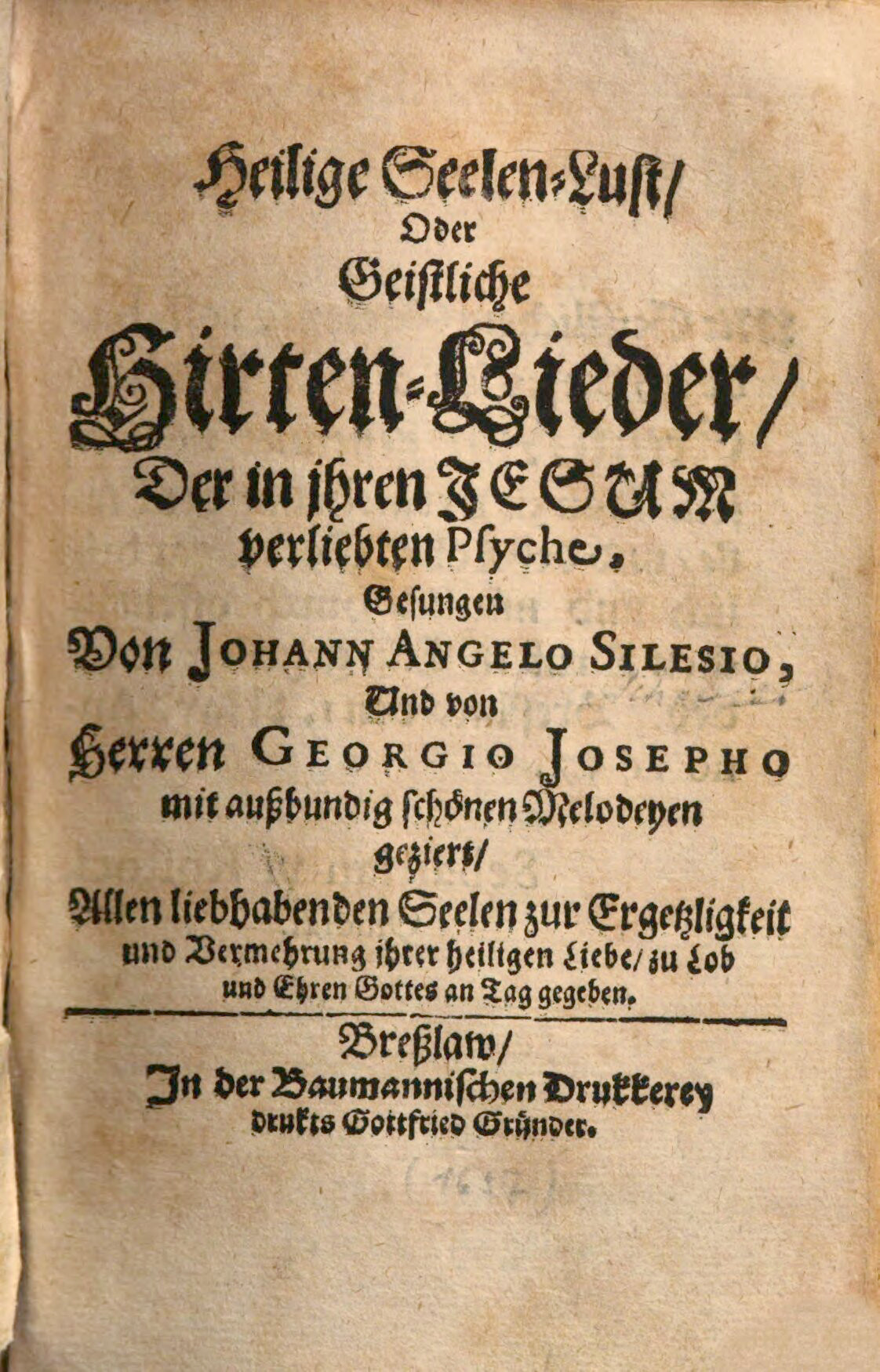
Title page of the collection Heilige Seelen-Lust

The full title of the collection is:

Heilige Seelen-Lust, oder Geistliche Hirten-Lieder der in ihren Jesum verliebten Psyche gesungen von Johann Angelo Silesio, Und von Herren Georgio Josepho mit außbundig schönen Melodeyen geziert / Allen liebhabenden Seelen zur Ergetzligkeit und Vermehrung ihrer heiligen Liebe / zu Lob und Ehren Gottes an Tag gegeben	Saintly Soul-Pleasure, or Spiritual Pastoral Songs, of the Soul that loveth Jesus, sung by Johann Angelus Silesius, and ornamented by Master George Joseph with wonderfully lovely Melodies. To all charitable Souls for the Satisfaction and Increase of their holy Love / to the Praise and Honour of God presented.

Scheffler's poem is in eight stanzas of six lines each, with rhyme scheme ABABCC. The shorter final line accents its content. It is part of a 1657 collection of pastoral religious poetry, Heilige Seelen-Lust Oder geistliche Hirten-Lieder Der in ihren JESUM verliebten Psyche (Holy bliss of the soul, or: spiritual shepherd songs of Psyche who is in love with her Jesus), in which the first person (ich) is the shepherdess and Jesus the shepherd. The original header confirm this: "Sie verspricht sich jhn biß in Tod zu lieben" (She promises herself to love him until her death). The poetry is in the tradition to interpret the Song of Songs as referring to Jesus.

The first two stanzas are a confession of love, with seven of its twelve lines beginning "Ich will dich lieben". The religious dimension is revealed at the end of the second stanza, referring to "Gottes Lamm" (Lamb of God). The first line relates already to Psalm 18:2. The third and fourth stanza refer to the themes of searching for the missed loved one from the Song of Songs. Love is described as "spät" (late), following Augustine's Confessiones 10, 27 and 34. It may relate to Scheffler's "late" (1653) conversion to the Catholic Church. The fifth to seventh stanzas express thanks for "Himmelswonne" (Heavenly bliss), including erotic imagery in the seventh stanza, which is therefore sometimes omitted in hymnals. The final stanza repeats the promise of the first, adding the motif of love for love's sake, without reward.

== Melodies ==
In its first print in 1657, the poem appeared with a melody with basso continuo by the composer Georg Joseph from Breslau which supports the bucolic character of the poetry by a triple time, and following the stresses of the first stanza. The poem is in bar form, but the melody does not repeat the beginning lines. It hides the shorter final line by an expressive melisma.

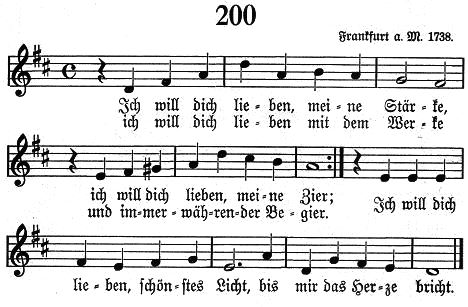
1738 melody

The text was also sung with other melodies, such as a tune published in the hymnal Harmonischer Liederschatz (Harmonic treasure of songs) in 1738 by Johann Balthasar König, a melody that was preferred in Protestant hymnals.

== Reception ==
Although Scheffler represented Catholicism polemically, "Ich will dich lieben" was first included in Protestant song collections. After several changes to the text during the 19th century, it was included in 1950 in the hymnal Evangelisches Kirchengesangbuch with mostly the original words and the 1738 melody, later in the Evangelisches Gesangbuch as EG 400.

As congregational singing was less prominent in the Catholic liturgy, "Ich will dich lieben" was included in some hymnals and prayer books only from the 19th century. The hymnal Kirchenlied, published in 1938, which had again Joseph's melody, brought its breakthrough. It was included in the 1975 Gotteslob and in the 2013 Gotteslob as GL 358.

Peter Cornelius composed a six-part motet on three stanzas, his Op. 18/2.
