= Totentanz (Distler) =

Motets around Danse Macabre

- Motets by Hugo Distler
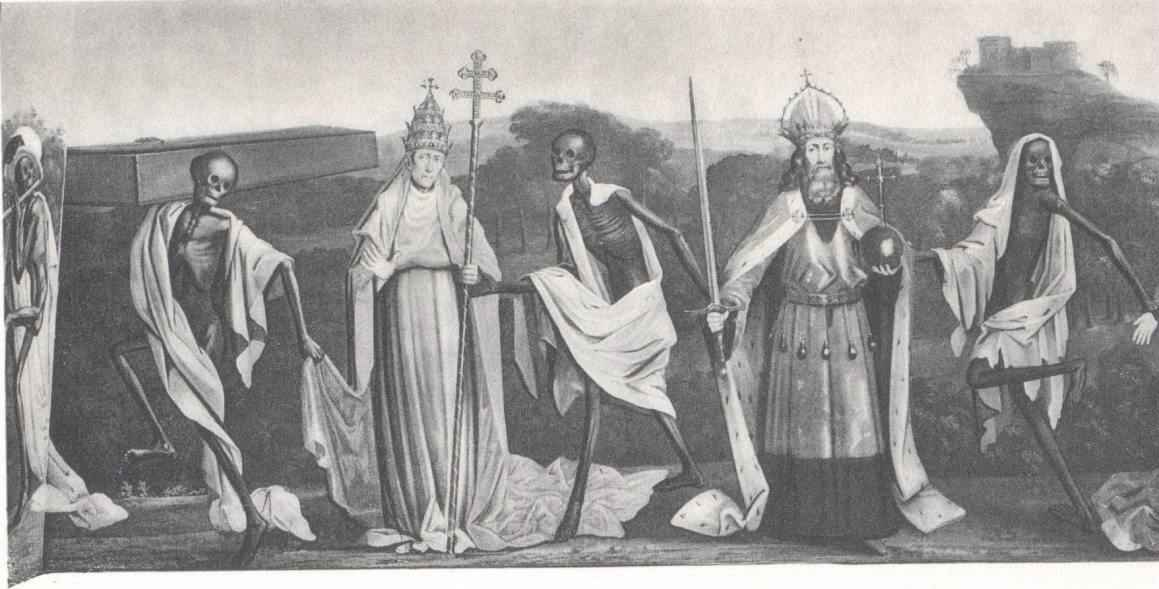
- From the Lübecker Totentanz, which inspired the work
- Opus: 12/2
- Occasion: Totensonntag
- Text: From Der Cherubinische Wandersmann by Angelus Silesius; Poems by Johannes Klöcking
- Language: German
- Composed: 1934
- Movements: 14

Premiere
- Date: 24 September 1934
- Location: Katharinenkirche, Lübeck

Totentanz (Danse Macabre), Op. 12/2, is a composition of 14 motets by Hugo Distler which he composed in 1934 for Totensonntag. The work was inspired by the medieval Lübecker Totentanz. The music is interspersed with twelve spoken texts. The motets are scored for a four-part choir a cappella, while the texts can be recited by one or more speakers. The text for the sung parts is taken from the Baroque poem Der Cherubinische Wandersmann by Angelus Silesius. The spoken stanzas were written by Johannes Klöcking, a contemporary of Distler.

== Text and music ==
In 1934, Distler, then 26, was inspired by the medieval Lübecker Totentanz, which would be destroyed in World War II. He chose stanzas from the Baroque poem Der Cherubinische Wandersmann (The Cherubinic Pilgrim) by Angelus Silesius and used them as text for 14 choral sections. The spoken poems connecting the choral sections were written by Johannes Klöcking, an acquaintance of the composer. They are a paraphrase of poetry from Lübecker Totentanz, a dialogue in Middle Low German between Death and its victims.

The world premiere of Totentanz was on 24 September 1934 at the Katharinenkirche in Lübeck, conducted by Bruno Grusnick. For a second performance in Kassel in November 1934, Distler composed additional short variations of the song "Es ist ein Schnitter" for solo recorder, which have since been performed regularly between the announcement of the next victim and the dialogue.

The work was published as No. 2 of Distler's Geistliche Chormusik (Sacred choral music), Op. 12. The subtitle is "14 Spruchmotetten zum Totensonntag nach Worten aus dem "Cherubinischen Wandersmann" des Angelus Silesius im Wechsel mit einem von Johannes Klöcking nach dem Lübecker Totentanz gestalteten Dialog für Sprecher; Flöte ad libitum" (14 motets on sayings for the Sunday of Death after words from "The Cherubinic Pilgrim" by Angelus Silesius in alternation with a dialogue for speakers created by Johannes Klöcking after the Lübeck Dance of Death; recorder ad libitum).

== Recordings ==
Totentanz was recorded in 1994 by the Kammerchor der Universität Dortmund, conducted by Willi Gundlach, with narrators Will Quadflieg, Michaela Krämer, Heinz Ostermann and Jürgen Uter. In 2016, it was recorded by the Kammerchor Josquin des Préz, conducted by Ludwig Böhme.

== Literature ==
- Barbara Distler-Harth: Hugo Distler. Lebensweg eines Frühvollendeten. Schott Music, Mainz 2008, ISBN 978-3-7957-0182-6, pp. 185, 195.
- Liner notes to Hugo Distler: Totentanz, Münchner Motettenchor, 1980
