= 1603 in Germany =

- Decades
- See also: Other events of 1603; History of Germany • Timeline • Years

Events from the year 1603 in Germany.

== Births ==
- Louise Juliane of Erbach
- John, Count of Nassau-Idstein
- Stephan Otto
- David Denicke
- Johann Sperling
- Caspar Kittel

== Deaths ==
- John VII, Count of Oldenburg
- Johannes Herold
- Elisabeth of Nassau-Dillenburg
- Hermann Wilken
- Merga Bien
