= Francis Florentine Hagen =

Moravian minister and composer

Francis Florentine Hagen (1815–1907) was a Moravian minister and composer. He is best known for his hymn "Morning Star" (1836) that is typically sung on Christmas Eve.

Hagen was born in Salem (now part of Winston-Salem), North Carolina, on October 30, 1815, the son of Johann Joachim Hagen and Susanna Lick. He grew up in Salem before attending the Moravian Theological Seminary in Bethlehem, Pennsylvania, where he graduated in 1835. He was ordained a deacon in the Moravian Church in 1844. Hagen served various congregations in North Carolina, Pennsylvania, Iowa and New York before retiring from the ministry in 1877.

As a composer, his musical style reflected his Moravian roots combined with elements of 19th century Romantic music. He composed large-scale orchestral and vocal works in addition to solo voice and piano pieces.

Hagen was one of the three original editors of the Moravian Magazine from 1856 to 1858. He died in Lititz, Pennsylvania, on July 7, 1907.
