= 1600 in Germany =

- Decades
- See also: Other events of 1600; History of Germany • Timeline • Years

Events from the year 1600 in Germany.

== Births ==
- Robert Roberthin
- Albert Curtz
- Joseph Heintz the Younger
- Fryderyk Getkant
- Susanna Mayr
- Johann Schröder

== Deaths ==
- Caspar Hennenberger
- Johann Major
- Johann Wolff
- Margaret Stuart
- Jacob Heerbrand
