= Congregational Store =

- U.S. National Register of Historic Places
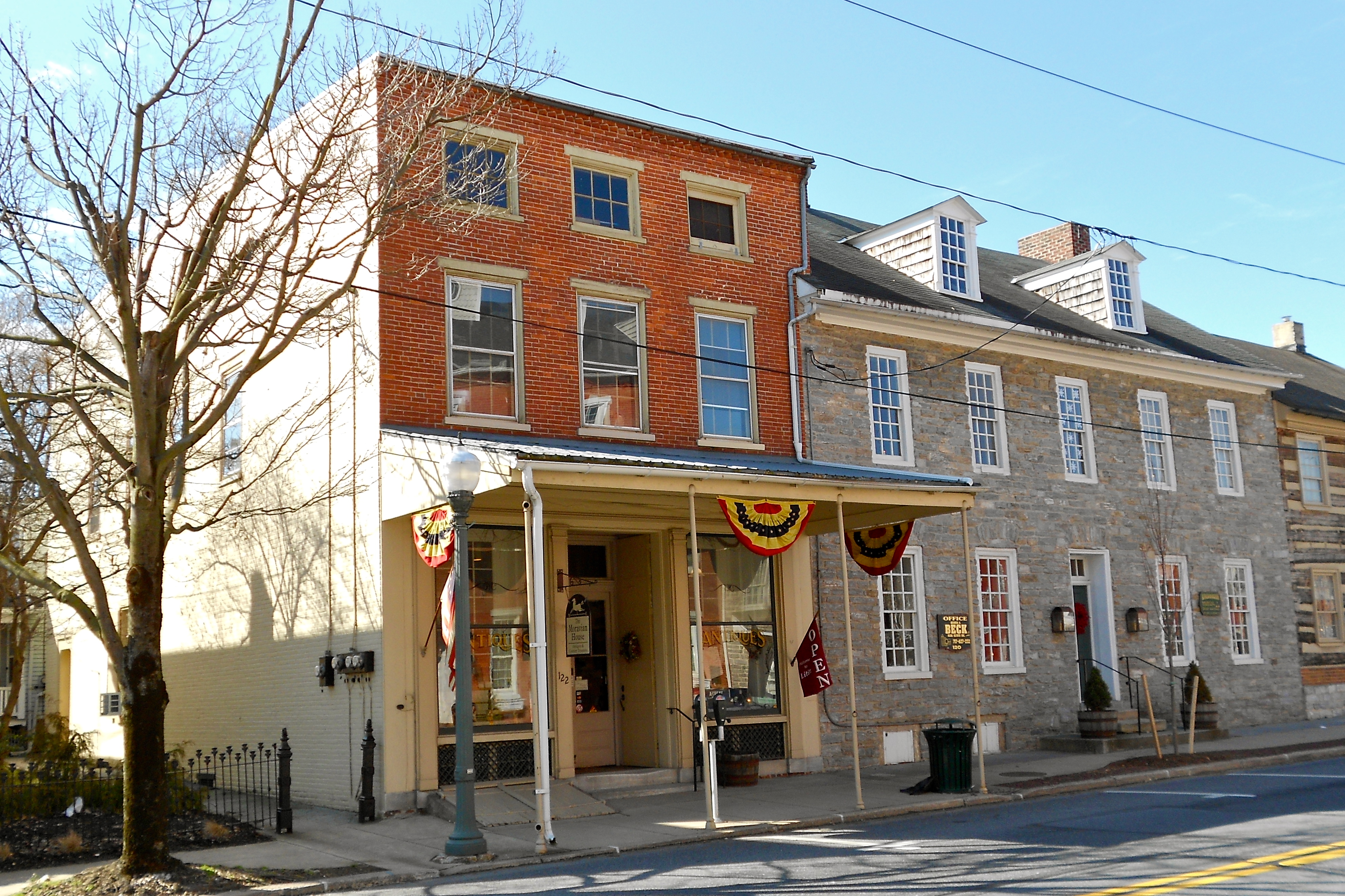
- Congregational Store, February 2012

- Location within Pennsylvania Location within the United States
- Location: 120-122 E. Main St., Lititz, Pennsylvania
- Coordinates: 40°9′23″N 76°18′14″W
- Area: 0.3 acres (0.12 ha)
- Built: 1762, c. 1854-1859
- NRHP reference No.: 83002250
- Added to NRHP: January 6, 1983

Congregational Store, also known as Wolle's Store, is a historic commercial building located at Lititz, Lancaster County, Pennsylvania. The original building was built in 1762, and is a two-story, five bay wide limestone building. Between about 1854 and 1859, a three-story, three bay extension was added to the east. At this time, the original building was stuccoed and an entry portico with Tuscan order columns was added.

It was listed on the National Register of Historic Places in 1983. It is located in the Lititz Moravian Historic District.
