= Johann Balthasar König =

German composer (1691–1758)

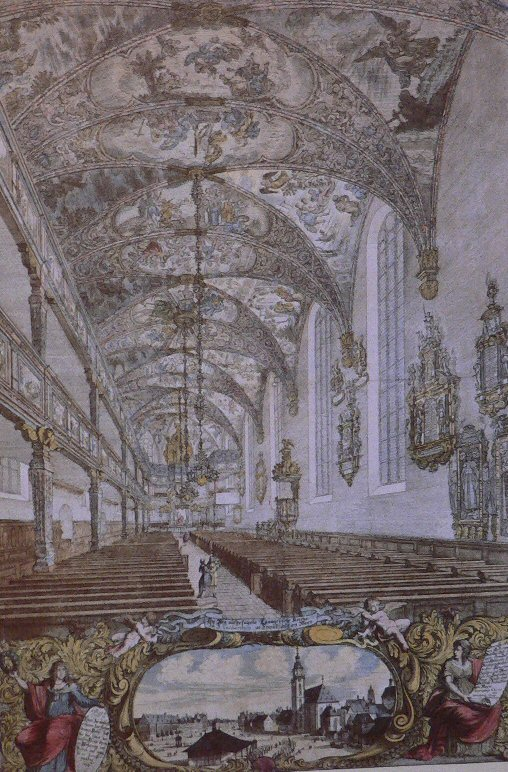
- Katharinenkirche in Frankfurt, where König led the church music, on a contemporary etching of 1683
- Born: Cannstatt, Duchy of Württemberg, Holy Roman Empire
- Baptised: 28 January 1691
- Died: 2 April 1758 (aged 67); Free Imperial City of Frankfurt, Holy Roman Empire
- Occupations: Church musician; Composer; Director of music
- Organizations: Katharinenkirche, Frankfurt

Johann Balthasar König (baptised 28 January 1691 – buried 2 April 1758) was a German Baroque composer, especially of hymn melodies, having published a hymnal with 1,913 melodies. He was the church musician at Frankfurt's main Protestant church, the Katharinenkirche, and the town's Kapellmeister. He was also closely associated with Georg Philipp Telemann.

== Early life and career ==
Born in Waltershausen, König was a son of Johann Jakob König. He was in Frankfurt a chorister of the municipal gymnasium. He joined the municipal chapel when Georg Philipp Telemann was its director.

König was appointed director of the chapel at the Katharinenkirche. He was promoted to municipal Kapellmeister (director of music) in 1727, succeeding Johann Christoph Bodinus (1690–1727).

König composed several hymns, cantatas and operas. His most important work is the 1738 collection Harmonischer Liederschatz, with 1,913 melodies, of which 358 were not published before. The full title reads:

Harmonischer Lieder-Schatz : oder Allgemeines Evangelisches Choral-Buch, Welches die Melodien aller in Deutschland eingeführten – sowohl deutschen als französischen alten und neuen Kirchen-Gesänge, wie auch derer Hundert und Funffzig Psalmen Davids, in sich hält; Anbey durch eine besondere Verfassung dergestalt eingerichtet ist, daß man die wegen ihrer neuen Vers-Arten bisher nicht einzuführen gewesene geistreiche Lieder nunmehro ebenfals singen – und durch einen leichten und modernen General-Baß mit der Orgel oder Clavier accompagniren kan. Harmonic treasure of songs : or General Protestant chorale book, which contains the melodies of all church songs introduced in Germany – both German and French, old and new, and the 150 psalms of David; arranged that one can also sing spiritual songs with new verse, which was not possible before, and accompany them with organ or clavier by an easy and modern general bass.

Three of his hymns are part of the current Protestant hymnal Evangelisches Gesangbuch, "O daß ich tausend Zungen hätte" (EG 330), "Ich habe nun den Grund gefunden" to lyrics by Johann Andreas Rothe (EG 354), and "Ich will dich lieben, meine Stärke" (EG 400). Martin Rößler, who analyzed the melody for Liederkunde zum Evangelischen Gesangbuch which supplies scholarly background information of songs in the EG, summarized that it follows the "emotional elements" of the text well by a focus on expansion at the beginning, and on concentration at the beginning of the abgesang, is well structured and offers some word painting.

== Personal life ==
König married Anna Maria Pfaff, the daughter of a tailor, in 1717. Telemann became the godfather of their son Georg Philipp, born in 1718.
