= Johann Agust Sutter House =

Historic house in Pennsylvania, United States

- U.S. National Register of Historic Places
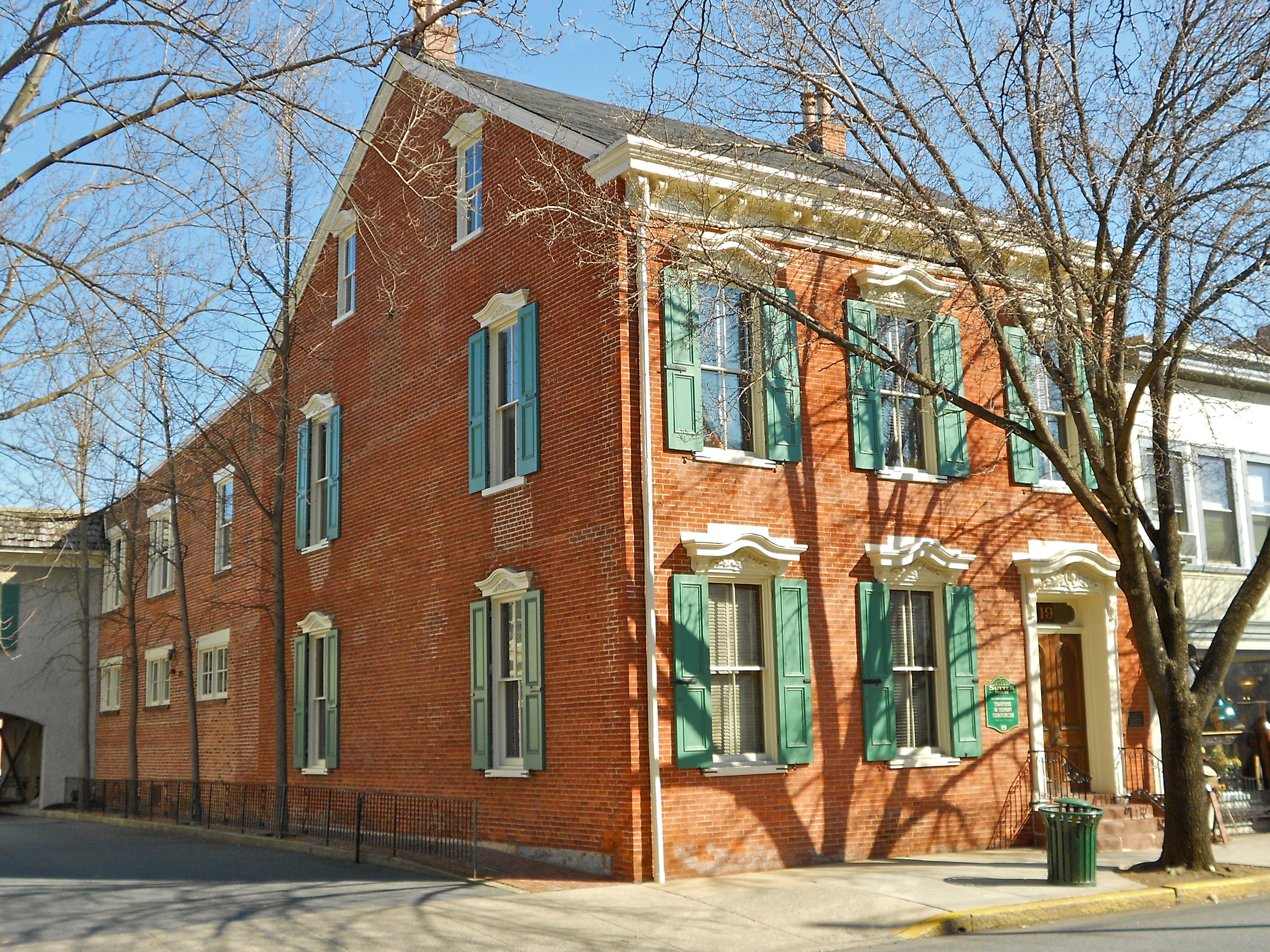
- Johann Agust Sutter House, February 2012

- Location within Pennsylvania Location within the United States
- Location: 17-19 E. Main St., Lititz, Pennsylvania
- Coordinates: 40°9′26″N 76°18′24″W
- Area: 0.1 acres (0.040 ha)
- Built: 1871
- Architectural style: Late Victorian
- NRHP reference No.: 82003795
- Added to NRHP: April 20, 1982

The Johann Agust Sutter House is an historic home that is located in Lititz, Lancaster County, Pennsylvania, United States.

Added to the National Register of Historic Places in 1982, it is located in the Lititz Moravian Historic District.

== History and architectural features ==
Built in 1871, this historic structure is a two-and-a-half-story brick dwelling with a gable roof. Designed in a Late Victorian style, it measures thirty feet wide by forty-two feet deep. During the 1930s it was modified for commercial use. This included rear brick and concrete block additions. It was the home of California pioneer Johann August Sutter (1803 – 1880), who built the structure after moving to Lititz in 1871.
