= Johann Sithmann =

German lawyer (1602–1666)

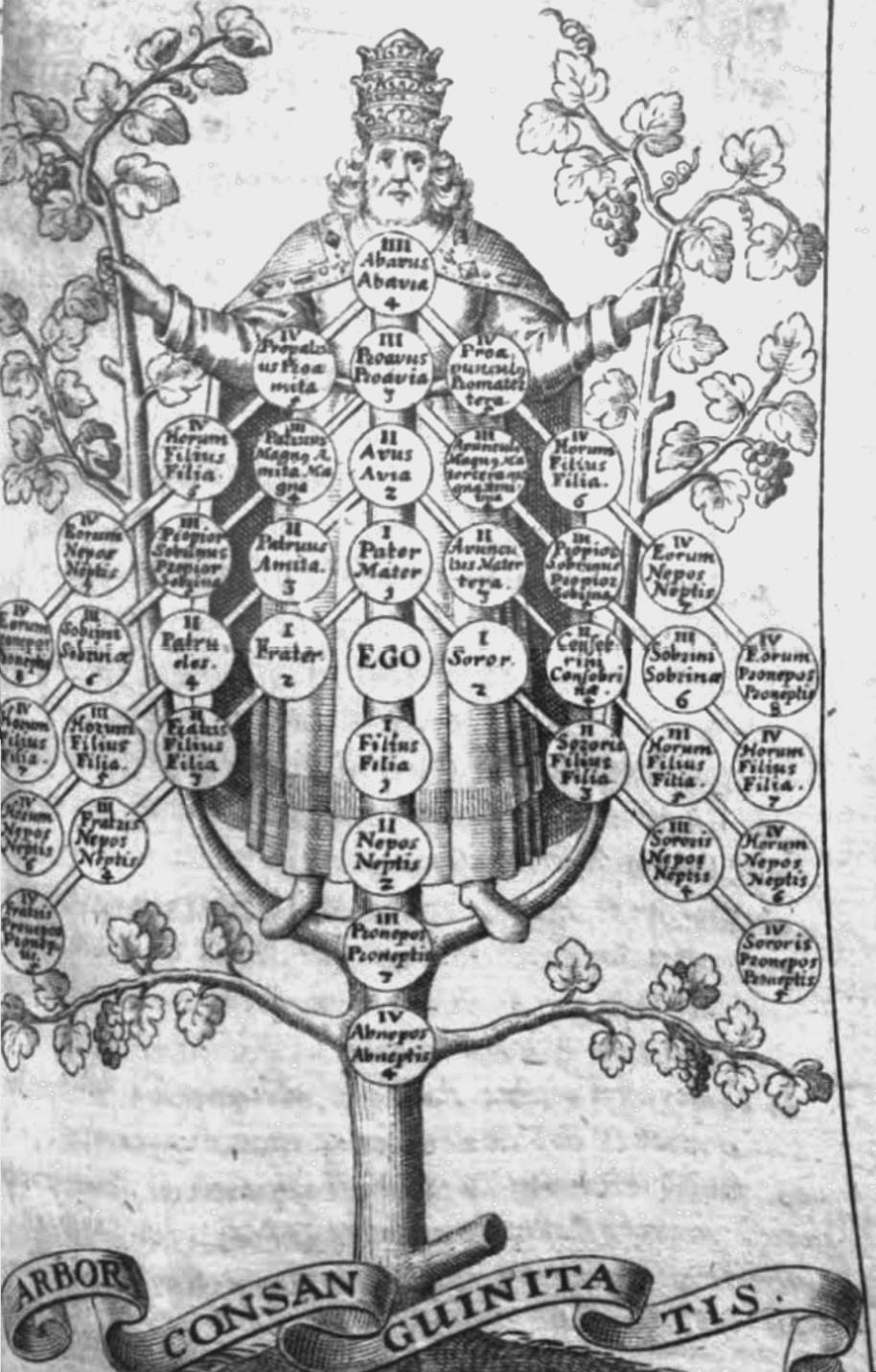
Family tree by Sithmann, 1657

Johann Sithmann (1602–1666) was a German jurist, Professor of Pedagogy at the University of Greifswald and writer, known from the 1657 publication Idea Arboris Consanguinitatis & Affinitatis Theoreticae & Practicae, and other works.

== Publications ==
- 1654. Disputatio ex jure publico de comitiis imperii Romano-Germanici
- 1654. Nucleus Pandectarum paratitlaris : praemissâ ad singulos quinquaginta libros tabulâ generali & singulorum librorum tabulis specialibus, qua seriem materiarum cognos cendam apprime utilibs, ex texta legum historia chronologica iure.
- 1657. Idea Arboris Consanguinitatis & Affinitatis Theoreticae & Practicae.
- 1657. Idea iuris episcopalis moderni : quomodo praesertim in ecclesiis Augustanae confessionis jus episcopale constituatur: in personis episcopum eligentibus ...; in singularem nostrorum consistoriorum & ecclesiarum utilitatem noviter exhibita
- 1661. Johannis Sithmanni speculum imperii Romani : ab origine urbis de eius regimine, magistratibus, patribus, plebe, iurisconsultis, deque iuris continuatione ad Iustinianum et inde de origine iurium Gothicorum, Longobardorum, de iure doctorum et academiarum, accessione iuris feudalis, canonici, iurisque publici introductione, transactione Passaviensi, pacificatione religiosa et capitulatione Caesarea; Varie et chronologice continuatum.
