= Angelus Silesius =

German writer

The Reverend Angelus Silesius OFM
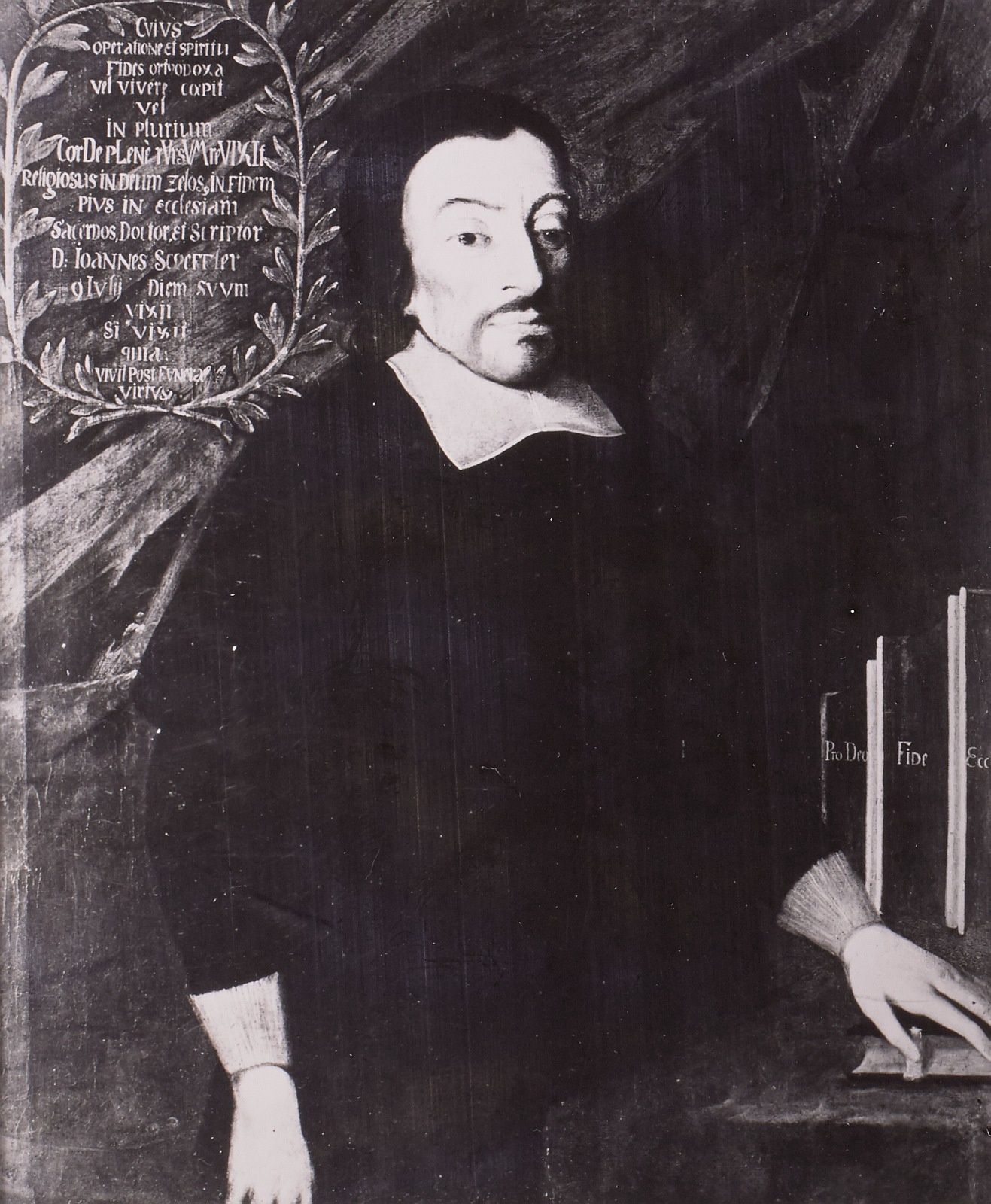
- Born: Johann Scheffler baptised 25 December 1624; Breslau, Silesia, Habsburg Monarchy
- Died: 9 July 1677 (aged 52); Breslau, Silesia, Habsburg monarchy
- Education: University of Strasbourg; Leiden University; University of Padua
- Occupations: Catholic priest, physician, mystic and religious poet
- Notable work: Heilige Seelen-Lust (1657); Cherubinischer Wandersmann (1657); Ecclesiologia (1677)

Angelus Silesius, OFM (c. 1624 – 9 July 1677), born Johann Scheffler, was a German Catholic priest, physician, mystic and religious poet. Born and raised a Lutheran, he began to read the works of medieval mystics while studying in the Netherlands and became acquainted with the works of the German mystic Jacob Böhme through Böhme's friend Abraham von Franckenberg. Silesius's display of his mystic beliefs caused tension with Lutheran authorities and led to his eventual conversion to Catholicism in 1653, wherein he adopted the name Angelus (Latin for "angel" or "heavenly messenger") and the epithet Silesius ("Silesian"). He entered the Franciscans and was ordained a priest in 1661. Ten years later, in 1671, he retired to a Jesuit house where he remained for the rest of his life.

An enthusiastic convert and priest, Silesius worked to convince German Protestants in Silesia to return to the Catholic Church. He composed 55 tracts and pamphlets condemning Protestantism, several of which were published in two folio volumes entitled Ecclesiologia (i.e., Ecclesiology). However, he is now remembered chiefly for his mystical poetry, and in particular for two poetical works, both published in 1657: Heilige Seelen-Lust (The Soul's Holy Desires), a collection of more than 200 religious hymn texts that have since been used by both Catholics and Protestants; and Cherubinischer Wandersmann ("The Cherubic Pilgrim"), a collection of 1,676 short poems, mostly in Alexandrine couplets. His poetry explores contemporary themes of the greatness of God, mystic interpretations of the Trinity, and the relationship between the soul and Christ. A small number of these couplets seem to savour of quietism or pantheism. They ought to be interpreted in an orthodox Catholic sense, for Angelus Silesius was not a pantheist. His prose writings are orthodox; "The Cherubic Pilgrim" was published with the ecclesiastical Imprimatur, and, in his preface, the author himself explains his "paradoxes" in an orthodox sense, and repudiates any future pantheistic interpretation.

== Life ==
=== Early life and education ===
While his exact birthdate is unknown, it is believed that Silesius was born in December 1624 in Breslau, the capital of Silesia. The earliest mention of him is the registration of his baptism on Christmas Day, 25 December 1624. At the time, Silesia was a province of the Habsburg Empire. Today, it is the southwestern region of Poland. Baptized Johann Scheffler, he was the first of three children. His parents, who married in February 1624, were Lutheran Protestants. His father, Stanislaus Scheffler (c. 1562–1637), was of Polish ancestry and was a member of the lower nobility. Stanislaus dedicated his life to the military, was made Lord of Borowice (or Vorwicze) and received a knighthood from King Sigismund III. A few years before his son's birth, he had retired from military service in Kraków. In 1624, he was 62. The child's mother, Maria Hennemann (c. 1600–1639), was a 24-year-old daughter of a local physician with ties to the Habsburg Imperial court.

Scheffler obtained his early education at the Elisabethsgymnasium (Saint Elizabeth's Gymnasium, or high school) in Breslau. His earliest poems were written and published during these formative years. Scheffler was probably influenced by the recently published works of the poet and scholar Martin Opitz and by one of his teachers, the poet Christoph Köler.

He subsequently studied medicine and science at the University of Strasbourg (or Strassburg) in Alsace for a year in 1643. It was then a Lutheran university with a course of study that embraced Renaissance humanism. From 1644 to 1647, he attended Leiden University. At this time, he was introduced to the writings of Jacob Böhme (1575–1624) and became acquainted with one of Böhme's friends, Abraham von Franckenberg (1593–1652), who probably introduced him to ancient Kabbalist writings, alchemy, and hermeticism, and to mystic writers living in Amsterdam. Franckenberg had been compiling a complete edition of Böhme's work at the time Scheffler resided in the Netherlands. The Dutch Republic provided refuge to many religious sects, mystics, and scholars who were persecuted elsewhere in Europe. Scheffler then went to Italy and enrolled in studies at the University of Padua in Padua in September 1647. A year later, he received a doctoral degree in philosophy and medicine and returned to his homeland.

=== Physician ===
On 3 November 1649, Scheffler was appointed to be the court physician to Silvius I Nimrod, Duke of Württemberg-Oels (1622–1664) and was given an annual salary of 175 thalers. Although he was "recommended to the Duke on account of his good qualities and his experience in medicine," it is likely that Scheffler's friend and mentor, Abraham von Franckenberg, had arranged the appointment given his closeness to the Duke. Franckenberg was the son of a minor noble from the village of Ludwigsdorf near Oels within the duchy. Franckenberg returned to the region the year before. It is also possible that Scheffler's brother-in-law, Tobias Brückner, who was also a physician to the Duke of Württemberg-Oels, may have recommended him. Scheffler soon was not happy in his position as his personal mysticism and critical views on Lutheran doctrine (especially his disagreements with the Augsburg Confession) caused friction with the Duke and members of the ducal court. The Duke was characterized in history as being "a zealous Lutheran and very bigoted." Coincidentally, it was at this time that Scheffler began to have mystical visions, which along with his public pronouncements led local Lutheran clergy to consider him a heretic. After Franckenberg's death in June 1652, Scheffler resigned his position—he may have been forced to resign—and sought refuge under the protection of the Roman Catholic Church.

=== Priest and poet ===
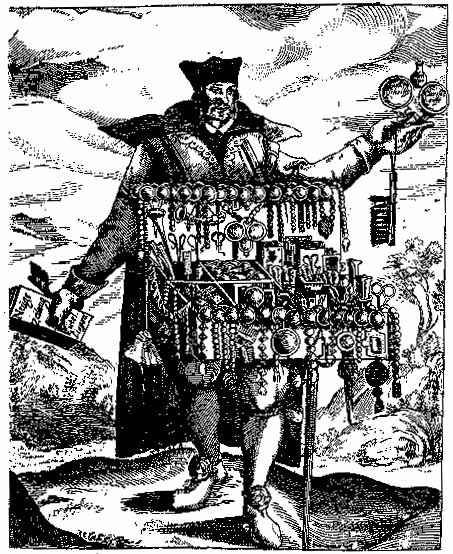
Protestant authorities attacked and denounced Silesius in print for his Catholic and mystical beliefs, as with this caricature from the Wohlverdientes Kapitel (1664) depicting him as a peddler of potions, rosaries, gambling cards and dice, spectacles, and other immoral wares.

The Lutheran authorities in the Reformed states of the Empire were not tolerant of Scheffler's increasing mysticism, and he was publicly attacked and denounced as a heretic. At this time, the Habsburg rulers (who were Catholic) were pushing for a Counter Reformation and advocated a re-Catholicisation of Europe. Scheffler sought to convert to Catholicism and was received by the Church of Saint Matthias in Breslau on 12 June 1653. Upon being received, he took the name Angelus, the Latin form of "angel", derived from the Greek ángelos (ἄγγελος, "messenger"); for his epithet, he took Silesius (Latin for "Silesian"). It is uncertain why he took this name, but he may have added it in honour of his native Silesia or to honour a favourite scholastic, mystic or theosophic author, to distinguish himself from other famous writers of his era: perhaps the Spanish mystic writer Juan de los Ángeles (author of The Triumph of Love) or Lutheran theologian Johann Angelus in Darmstadt. He no longer used the name Scheffler, but did on occasion use his first name, Johann. From 1653 until his death, he used the names Angelus Silesius and also Johann Angelus Silesius.

Shortly after his conversion, on 24 March 1654, Silesius received an appointment as Imperial Court Physician to Ferdinand III, the Holy Roman Emperor. However, this was probably an honorary position to offer some official protection against Lutheran attackers, as Silesius never went to Vienna to serve the Imperial Court. It is very likely that he never practiced medicine after his conversion to Catholicism.

In the late 1650s, he sought permission (a nihil obstat or imprimatur) from Catholic authorities in Vienna and Breslau to begin publishing his poetry. He had begun writing poetry at an early age, publishing a few occasional pieces when a schoolboy in 1641 and 1642. He attempted to publish poetry while working for the Duke of Württemberg-Oels, but was refused permission by the Duke's orthodox Lutheran court clergyman, Christoph Freitag. However, in 1657, after obtaining the approval of the Catholic Church, two collections of his poems were published—the works for which he is known—Heilige Seelen-Lust (The Soul's Holy Desire) and Der Cherubinische Wandersmann (The Cherubinic Pilgrim).

On 27 February 1661, Silesius took vows as a Franciscan. Three months later, he was ordained a priest in the Silesian Duchy of Neisse—an area of successful re-Catholicisation and one of two ecclesiastical states within the region (that is, ruled by a Prince-Bishop). When his friend Sebastian von Rostock (1607–1671) became Prince-Bishop of Breslau, Silesius was appointed his Rath und Hofmarschall (a counselor and Chamberlain). During this time, he began publishing over fifty tracts attacking Lutheranism and the Protestant Reformation. Thirty-nine of these essays he later compiled into a two-volume folio collection entitled Ecclesiologia (1676).

=== Death ===
After the death of the Prince-Bishop of Breslau in 1671, Silesius retired to the Hospice of the Knights of the Cross with the Red Star (the Matthiasstift), a Jesuit house associated with the church of Saint Matthias at Breslau. He died on 9 July 1677 and was buried there. Some sources claim he died from tuberculosis ("consumption"), others describe his illness as a "wasting sickness." Immediately after news of his death spread, several of his Protestant detractors spread the untrue rumour that Silesius had hanged himself. By his Will, he distributed his fortune, largely inherited from his father's noble estate, to pious and charitable institutions, including orphanages.

== Importance ==
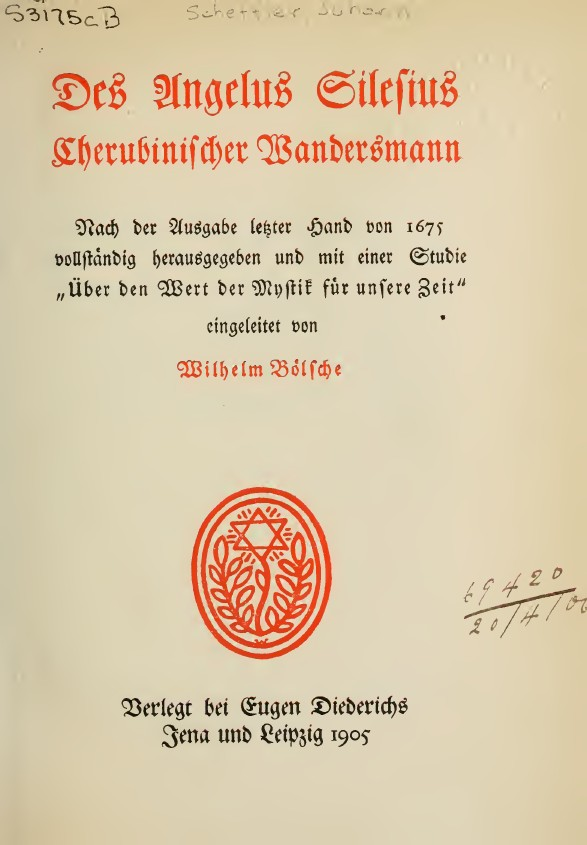
Des Angelus Silesius Cherubinischer Wandersmann (1905)

=== Interpretation of his work ===
The poetry of Angelus Silesius consists largely of epigrams in the form of alexandrine couplets—the style that dominated German poetry and mystical literature during the Baroque era. According to Baker, the epigram was key to conveying mysticism, because "the epigram with its tendency towards brevity and pointedness is a suitable genre to cope with the aesthetic problem of the ineffability of the mystical experience." The Encyclopædia Britannica Eleventh Edition identifies these epigrams as Reimsprüche—or rhymed distichs—and describes them as:

...embodying a strange mystical pantheism drawn mainly from the writings of Jakob Böhme and his followers. Silesius delighted specially in the subtle paradoxes of mysticism. The essence of God, for instance, he held to be love; God, he said, can love nothing inferior to himself; but he cannot be an object of love to himself without going out, so to speak, of himself, without manifesting his infinity in a finite form; in other words, by becoming man. God and man are therefore essentially one.

Silesius's poetry directs the reader to seek a path toward a desired spiritual state, an eternal stillness, by eschewing material or physical needs and the human will. It requires an understanding of God that is informed by the ideas of apophatic theology and of antithesis and paradox. Some of Silesius's writings and beliefs that bordered on pantheism or panentheism caused tensions between Silesius and local Protestant authorities. However, in the introduction to Cherubinischer Wandersmann, he explained his poetry (especially its paradoxes) within the framework of Catholic orthodoxy and denied pantheism which would have run afoul of Catholic doctrine.

His mysticism is informed by the influences of Böhme and Franckenberg as well as of prominent writers Meister Eckhart (1260–1327), Johannes Tauler (c. 1300–1361), Heinrich Suso (c. 1300–1366), and Jan van Ruysbroeck (1293/4–1381). Critic and literary theorist Georg Ellinger surmised in his study of Silesius that his poetry was influenced by loneliness (especially due to the death of his parents and becoming an orphan early in life), ungoverned impulsivity, and lack of personal fulfillment, rendering much of his poetry confessional and exhibiting internal psychological conflict.

=== Use in hymns ===
Several of the poems of Silesius have been used or adapted as hymns used in Protestant and Catholic services. In many early Lutheran and Protestant hymnals, these lyrics were attributed to "anonymous", rather than admit they were penned by the Catholic Silesius, known for his criticism and advocacy against Protestantism. In many instances, the verse of Silesius is attributed in print to "anonymous" or to "I.A." While I.A. were the Latin initials for Iohannis Angelus they were often misinterpreted as Incerti auctoris, meaning "unknown author". Likewise, several truly anonymous works were later misattributed to Silesius, thanks to the same ambiguous initials. Verses by Silesius appear in the lyrics of hymns published in Nürnberg Gesang-Buch (1676), Freylinghausen's Gesang-Buch (1704), Porst's Gesang-Buch (1713); and Burg's Gesang-Buch (1746). Seventy-nine hymns using his verses were included in Nicolaus Zinzendorf's Christ-Catholisches Singe und Bet-Büchlein (1727). During the 18th Century, they were frequently in use in the Lutheran, Catholic, and Moravian Churches. Many of these hymns are still popular in Christian churches today.

== In popular culture ==
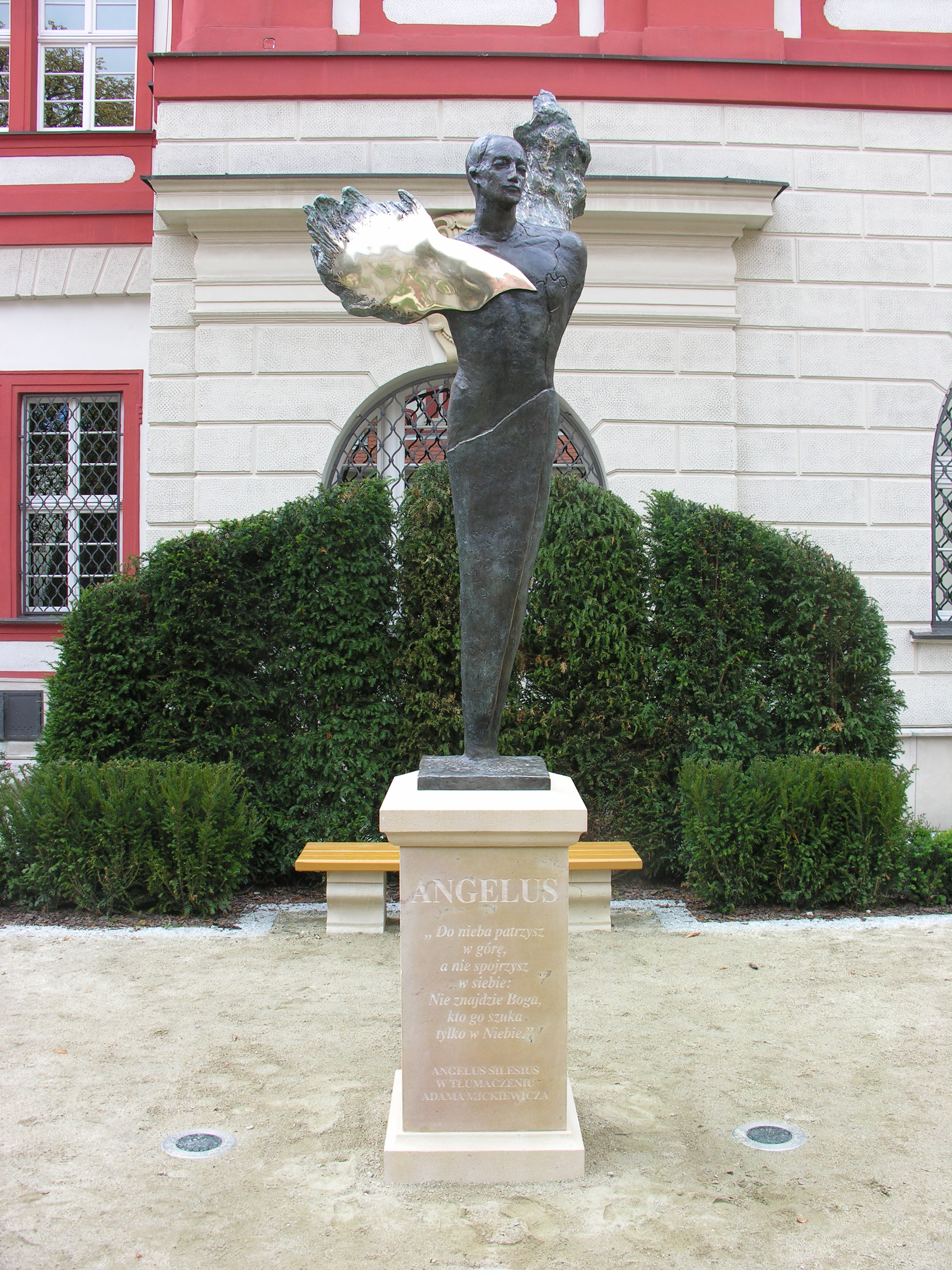
Monument in Wrocław

- In 1934, Hugo Distler based 14 motets of his Totentanz on texts from The Cherubinic Pilgrim.
- In a series of lectures entitled Siete Noches ("Seven Nights") (1980), Argentine writer and poet Jorge Luis Borges (1899–1986) remarks that the essence of poetry can be encapsulated in a single line from Silesius. Borges wrote:

I will end with a great line by the poet who, in the seventeenth century, took the strangely real and poetic name of Angelus Silesius. It is the summary of all I have said tonight — except that I have said it by means of reasoning and simulated reasoning. I will say it first in Spanish and then in German:

La rosa es sin porqué; florece porque florece.
Die Rose ist ohne warum; sie blühet weil sie blühet.

The line he quoted, Die Rose ist ohne warum; sie blühet, weil sie blühet... from Silesius's The Cherubinic Pilgrim (1657), can be translated as: "The Rose is without a 'wherefore'—she blooms because she blooms." The influence of mysticism is seen in the work of Borges, especially in his poetry, which frequently references Silesius and his work.

- This same line was often referenced in the work of Martin Heidegger (1889–1976) who (building on the work of Leibniz and Hegel) explored mysticism in many of his works, in which he defines a theory of truth as phenomenal and defying any rational explanation. Heidegger was commenting on the rational philosophy of German philosopher and mathematician Leibniz (1646–1716)—a contemporary of Silesius—who called the mystic's poetry "beautiful", but "extraordinarily daring, full of difficult metaphors and inclined almost to godlessness" despite Silesius's mysticism being contrary to Leibniz's principium reddendae rationis sufficientis, the Principle of sufficient reason.
- In the 1991 American film Cape Fear directed by Martin Scorsese, the film's sadistic antagonist, Max Cady (played by Robert De Niro) quotes a verse of Silesius. The verse is:

10. Ich bin wie Gott, und Gott wie ich.
Ich bin so groß als Gott, er ist als ich so klein:
Er kann nicht über mich, ich unter ihm nicht sein.

Translation:

I am like God and God like me.
I am as large as God, He is as small as I.
He cannot above me, nor I beneath him be.

— English translation used in film

However, the context of this line in the film contradicts the meaning intended by Angelus Silesius. Max Cady has a God complex and quotes Silesius' poem to emphasize to his intended victims both the power of his individual will and his god-like ability to exact a violent vengeance. The context intended by Silesius was of man's realization through his spiritual potential for perfection that his nature's meaning and fulfilment was oneness with God in the sense of the mystical divine union or theosis—that experience of direct communion of love between the believer and God as equals by grace.

== Works ==
The title page of the 1674 edition Der Cherubinische Wandersmann

=== Poetry ===
- 1642: Bonus Consiliarius (trans. The Good Counselor)
- 1657: Heilige Seelen-Lust, oder geistliche Hirtenlieder der in ihren Jesum verliebten Psyche (trans. The Soul's Holy Desires, or the Spiritual Songs of the Shepherd in your Christ-loving Spirit)
  - "Ich will dich lieben, meine Stärke"
  - "Mir nach, spricht Christus, unser Held"
  - "Morgenstern der finstern Nacht"
- 1657: Geistreiche Sinn-und-Schlussreime zur göttlichen Beschaulichkeit (trans. "Ingenious Aphorisms in End-Rhymes to Divine Tranquility", or "Witty Aphorisms in End-Rhymes to Divine Tranquility") renamed in the 2nd edition (1674) to Cherubinischer Wandersmann (trans. "Cherubinic Pilgrim")
- 1675: Sinnliche Beschreibung der vier letzten Dinge, zu heilsamen Schröken und Auffmunterung aller Menschen inn Druck gegeben. Mit der himmlischen Procession vermehrt, &c. (trans. "A Sensuous Representation of the Four Last Things...")

=== Theological tracts and polemical writings ===
- 1653: Gründtliche Ursachen von Motiven, warumb Er Von dem Lutherthumb abgetretten, und sich zu der Catholischen Kyrchen bekennet hat. (trans. "a thorough examination of his motives why he has deviated from Lutheranism and confessed to the Catholic church")
- 1663: Türcken-Schrifft Von den Ursachen der Türkischen Überziehung. (trans. Writing on the Turks: Of the causes of the Turkish invasion")
- 1664: Kehr-Wisch Zu Abkehrung des Ungeziefers Mit welchem seine wolgemeinte Tückenschrifft Christianus Chemnitius hat wollen verfasst machen. (trans. "A Sweeping of the nonsense with which Christianus Chemnitius has wanted to fill his well-intended writing on the Turks")
- 1664: Zerbrochene Triumphs-Wagen auff welchem er Uber die Lutheraner triumphirend einzufahren ihm im Traum vorkommen lassen. (trans. "The Broken Triumph Wagon, over which he triumphantly can tell the Lutherans it can happen in a dream")
- 1664: Christen-Schrifft Von dem herrlichen Kennzeichen deß Volkes Gottes. (trans. "That the Christian scriptures are the lovely mark of God's people")
- 1664: Und Scheffler redet noch! Daß ist Johannis Schefflers Schutz-Rede Für sich und seine Christen-Schrifft. (trans. "And Scheffler still speaks! That Johann Scheffler's protecting speech for himself and his Christian scriptures")
- 1665: Kommet her und Sehet mit vernünfftigen Augen wie Joseph und die Heiligen bey den Catholischen geeehret. (trans. "Come and Behold, glorified with reasonable eyes as Joseph and the Saints by the Catholics")
- 1665: Der Lutheraner und Calvinisten Abgott der Vernunfft entblösset dargestellt. (trans. "The God of Reason of the Lutherans and Calvinists shown denuded.")
- 1665: Gülden-Griff Welcher Gestalt alle Ketzer auch von dem Ungelehrtesten leichtlich können gemeistert werden.
- 1666: Des Römischen Bapists Oberhauptmannschaft über die gantze allgemeine Kirche Christi. (trans. "The Roman Baptists' leadership of the entire general Church of Christ")
- 1667: Johannis Schefflers Gründliche Außführung Daß die Lutheraner auf keine weise noch wege ihren Glauben in der Schrifft zu zeigen vermögen und ihr Gott ein blosser Wahn Bild oder Ding ihrer Vernunfft sey. (trans. "A thorough handling that the Lutherans have no routes to their faith in the Scriptures to show their God as either a mere hallucination or a thing of reason")
- 1670: Kurtze Erörterung Der Frage Ob die Lutheraner in Schlesien der in Instrumento Pacis denen Augsburgischen Confessions-Verwandten verliehenen Religions-Freyheit sich getrösten können. (trans. "A short discussion of the question whether religious liberty can exist with the Lutherans in Silesia where the Augsburg Confessions have been accorded an Instrument of Peace")
- 1670: Christiani Conscientiosi Sendschreiben An Alle Evangelische Universitäten in welchem er seine Gewissens-Scrupel proponirt. (trans. "To all conscientious Christians: A Letter to all Protestant Universities in which he proposes his scruples of conscience")
- 1671: Johann Schefflers Erweiß Daß der gröste Hauffe die rechte Kirche sey; Und man sich kurtzumb zu der Catholischen Kirche begeben musse wo man ewig Seelig werden wil. (trans. "Johann Scheffler's knowledge that the greatest home the true church is—to go to the Catholic church where you will be forever blessed")
- 1672: J. E. InformationSchreiben Wegen des Fegefeuers an E. V. In welchem unüberwindlich erwiesen wird daß mehr als zwey Orte der Seelen nach dem Tode und ein Fegefeuer sey. (trans. "An informative letter on Purgatory, proving insurmountably the more than two places of the soul after death and purgatory")
- 1673: Hierothei Boranowsky Gerechtfertigter Gewissens-Zwang Oder Erweiß daß man die Ketzer zum wahren Glauben zwingen könne und solle. (trans. Boranowsky's The Justified Coercion of Conscience, or the knowledge of what could and should force heretics to the true faith")
- 1675: Johannis Schefflers Alleiniges Him[m]elreich Das ist Abweisung Des schädlichen Wahns daß man wol Seelig werden könne wenn man gleich nicht Catholisch wird. (trans. "Johann Scheffler's The Kingdom of Heaven alone rejects the harmful delusion that you can be saved if you are not Catholic")
- 1675: D. J. Schefflers Vernünfftiger Gottes-Dienst. (trans. "J. Scheffler's Reasonable Service to God")
- 1675: Der Catholisch gewordene Bauer Und Lutherische Doctor (trans. "The Catholic becomes a farmer and Lutheran Doctor")
- 1677: Ecclesiologia Oder Kirche-Beschreibung. (trans. "The Words of the Church, or Description of the Church")

== See also ==
- Catholic spirituality
- Christian mysticism
- German mysticism
- Physician writer
- Quietism (Christian philosophy) or Hesychasm
