= Morning Star (carol) =

Traditional Moravian carol

- Full title: Morning Star, O Cheering Sight
- Genre: Christmas carol
- Written: 1657 (text) and 1836 (melody)
- Text: Johannes Scheffler in 1657
- Language: English, translated from German by Bennet Harvey, Jr. (1885)
- Based on: Revelation 22:16
- Meter: 7.7.3.3.7.
- Melody: Francis F. Hagen in 1836

"Morning Star" is an American Moravian Church carol with text originating from a poem by Johannes Scheffler in 1657 and music composed by Francis F. Hagen in 1836.
