= Lagartera =

- Municipality
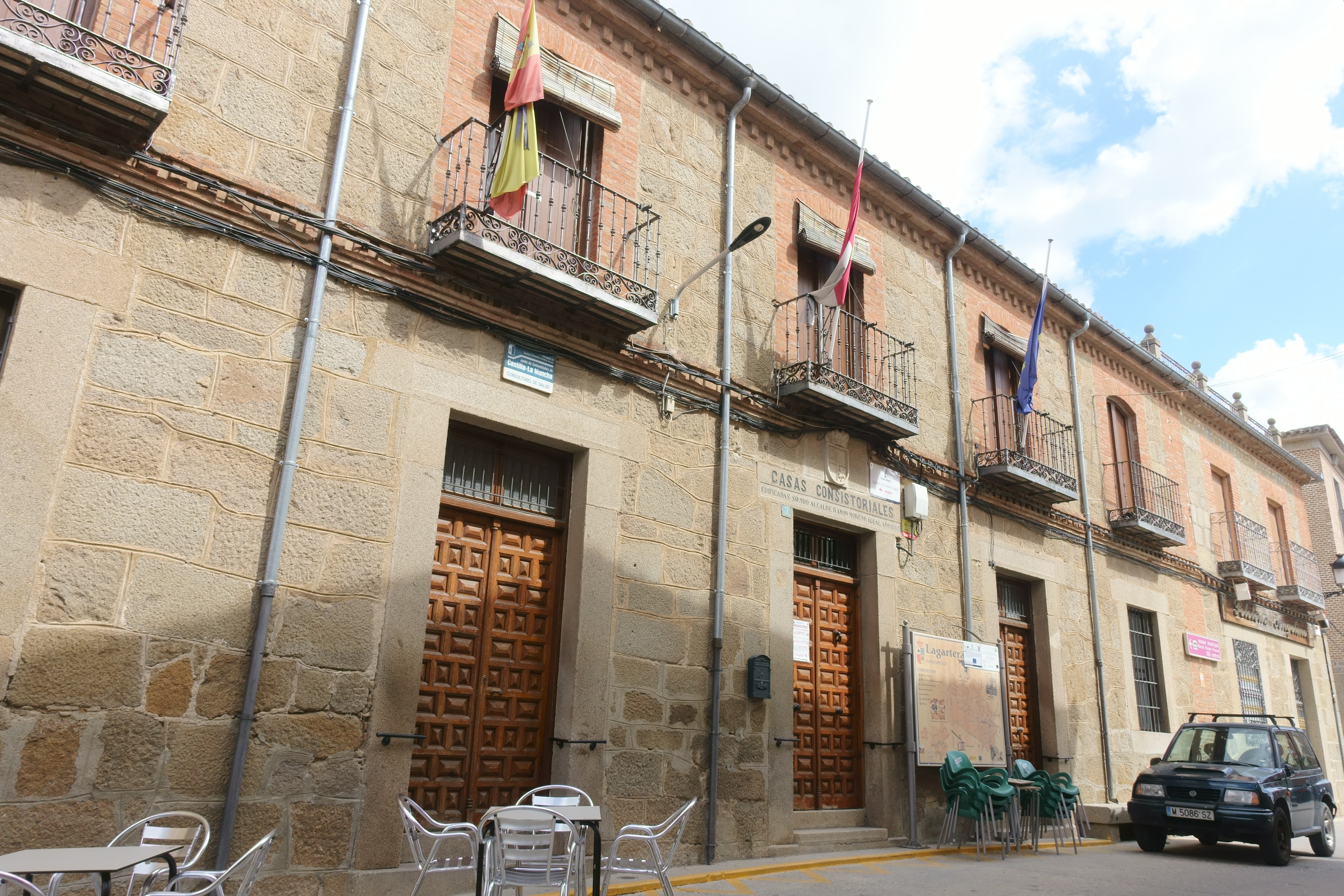
- Town hall

- Flag Coat of arms

- Location within Castilla-La Mancha Location within Spain
- Coordinates: 39°54′18″N 5°12′03″W
- Country: Spain
- Autonomous community: Castilla–La Mancha
- Province: Toledo

Area
  - Total: 81.02 km^{2} (31.28 sq mi)
- Elevation: 389 m (1,276 ft)

Population (2025-01-01)
  - Total: 1,294
  - Density: 15.97/km^{2} (41.37/sq mi)
- Time zone: UTC+1 (CET)
  - Summer (DST): UTC+2 (CEST)

Lagartera is a municipality of Spain located in the province of Toledo, Castilla–La Mancha. The municipality spans across a total area of 81.02 km^{2} and, as of 1 January 2020, it has a registered population of 1,354.

== History ==
Part of the Campo Arañuelo, the settlement dates at least from the late 13th century. The hamlet of Lagartera belonged to the lordship of Oropesa, which segregated from the land of Ávila in the late 13th century. Lagartera was granted township on 21 January 1642. The village of Lagartera is renowned for its centuries-old tradition of embroidery, needlework and lace-making.

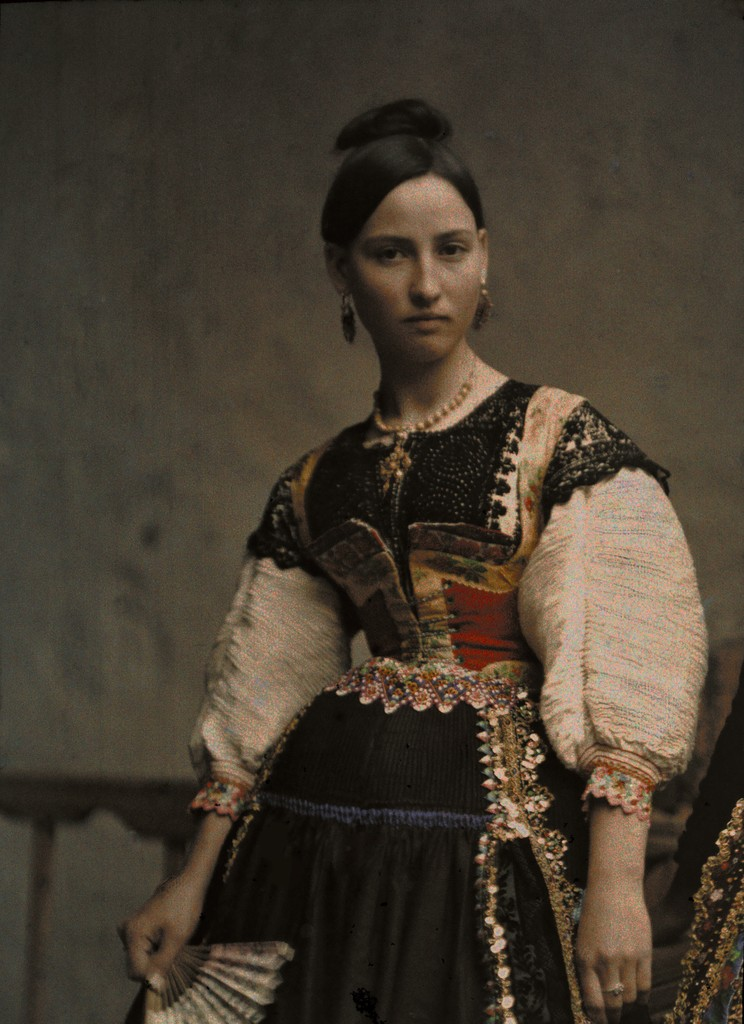
Moza lagarterana by Jules Gervais-Courtellemont (1924)

== Demographics ==
Historical population
| Year | Pop. | ±% |
|---|---|---|
| 1900 | 2,110 | — |
| 1910 | 2,538 | +20.3% |
| 1920 | 2,398 | −5.5% |
| 1930 | 2,638 | +10.0% |
| 1940 | 2,543 | −3.6% |
| 1950 | 2,900 | +14.0% |
| 1960 | 2,968 | +2.3% |
| 1970 | 2,518 | −15.2% |
| 1981 | 1,980 | −21.4% |
| 1991 | 1,841 | −7.0% |
| 2001 | 1,813 | −1.5% |
| 2011 | 1,564 | −13.7% |
| 2021 | 1,331 | −14.9% |
| 2023 | 1,306 | −1.9% |
Source: INE
