= Christoph Köler =

German poet and writer

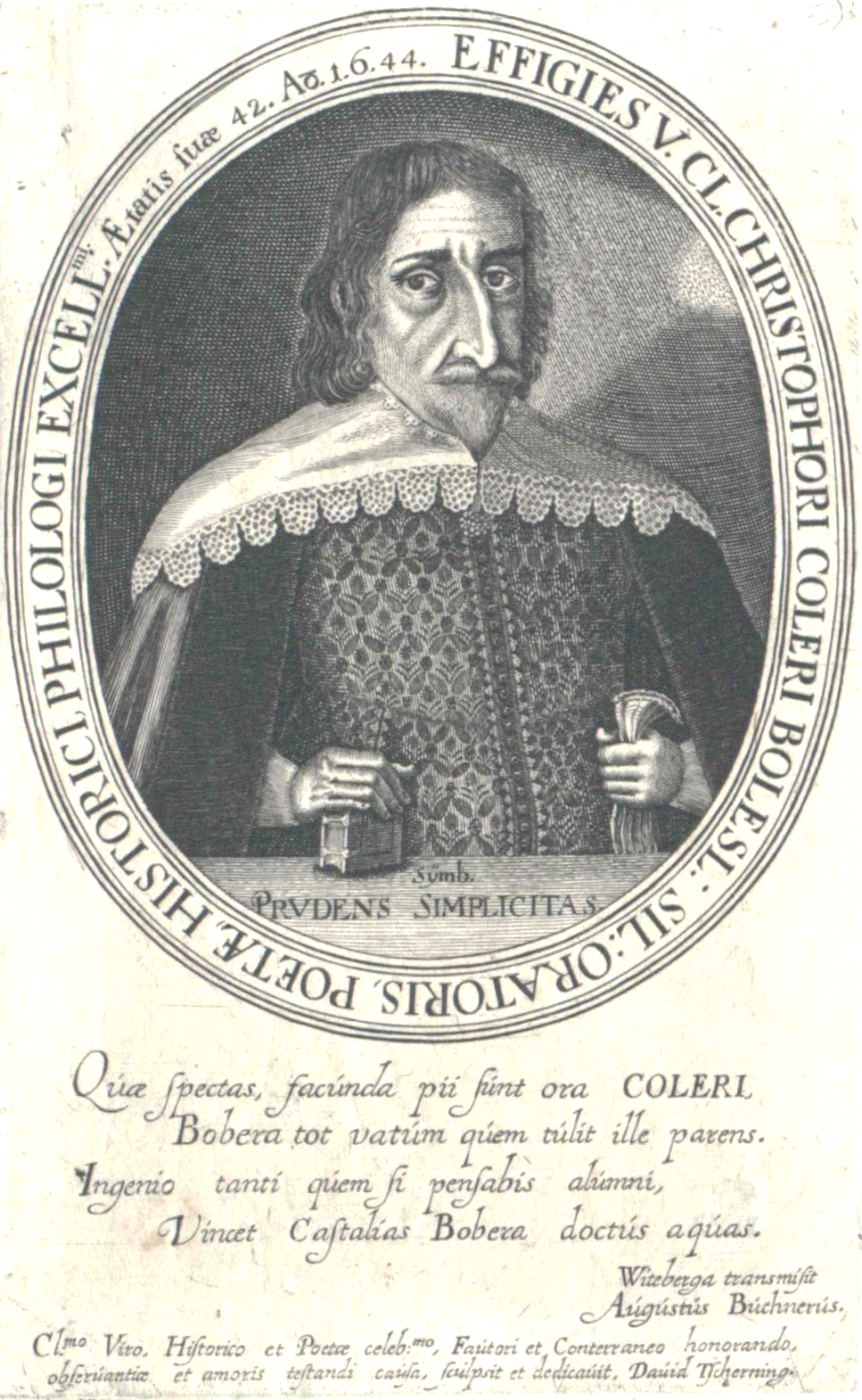
Portrait of Christoph Köler (1644)

Christoph Köler or (in Latin), Christophorus Colerus (1 December 1602 in Bunzlau, Fürstentum Schweidnitz-Jauer - 19 April 1658 in Breslau) was a German poet and writer. A student of Martin Opitz (1597–1637) and follower of his Baroque poetical reforms, Köler later revised his papers and published a biography of his teacher. His most noted student was the German priest, and mystical poet Angelus Silesius (1624–1677).

Köler was born in 1602 in Silesian Bolesławiec in the Duchy of Jawor, at got his first schooling at the Elisabet-Gymnasium in Breslau. Subsequently, he studied from 1624 to 1629 jurisprudence at the University of Strasbourg, where he joined the historian and philologist Matthias Egger of Bern. Köler returned to Bolesławiec in 1629. He was hired at the Breslauer Elisabeth-Gymnasium in 1634, and was appointed deputy head and Professor in 1637.

== Biography ==
Max Hippe (1902). Christoph Köler, ein schlesischer Dichter des siebzehnten Jahrhunderts: Sein Leben und eine Auswahl seiner deutschen Gedichte (in German). E. Morgenstern.
