= Pretzel Belt =

- Cultural region of the United States
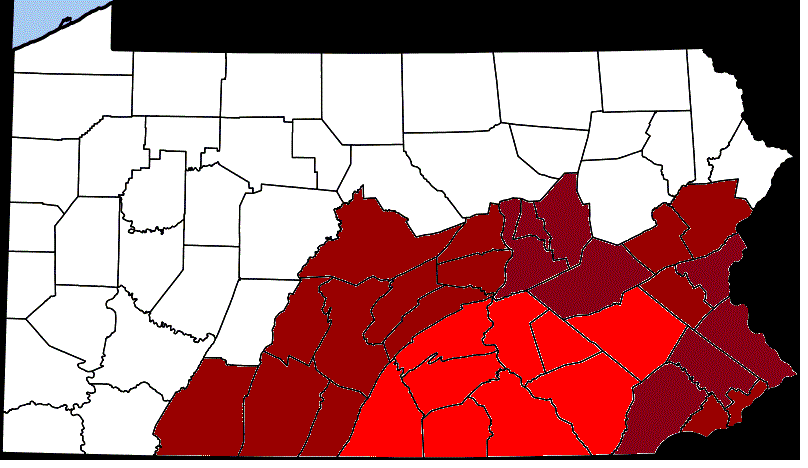
- Areas encompassing the counties largely constituting the Pretzel Belt with brighter red reflecting Pennsylvania Dutch Country
- Country: United States
- States: Pennsylvania

The Pretzel Belt, Pennsylvania Snack Belt or Pretzelvania, is a concentration of pretzel and snack food makers in the central southeastern region of Pennsylvania, roughly coterminous with Pennsylvania Dutch Country. The first commercial pretzel manufacturer in the United States, the Julius Sturgis Pretzel Bakery, was founded in the region in the borough of Lititz in 1861, and remains extant there today. By the beginning of the 20th century the pretzel had become a cultural institution in the region.

The rise of pretzels in the region is attributed in part to their popularity with Civil War soldiers who passed through the area. In the twentieth century, the first automated pretzel machine was developed in Reading, Pennsylvania. Manufacturers also include several pretzel and chip bakeries in Hanover, Pennsylvania, which holds the nickname "the snack capital of the world", as well as other examples like Hershey, Pennsylvania, home of the Hershey Chocolate Company and Asher's Chocolate Co., in Souderton, Pennsylvania.

Pennsylvania in general produces 80% of the pretzels consumed in the U.S., with many of the top producers located in York County alone. Auntie Anne's, the international pretzel franchise, was founded in Downingtown, Pennsylvania.

The term "Pretzel Belt" has also been used in a similar context to describe an area of the mid-Atlantic where pretzel consumption is higher than most U.S. states. Pretzel companies founded in this region include Julius Sturgis Pretzel Bakery, Philadelphia Pretzel Factory, Herr's, Utz, Auntie Anne's, Snyder's of Hanover, Snyder's of Berlin, Federal Pretzel Baking Company, Rold Gold, and Wise.

== See also ==
Pennsylvania Cultural Area
