= List of pretzel companies =

This is a list of pretzel companies. These are notable companies that bake pretzels, or have a major pretzel-based product or service.

== By country ==
=== Australia ===
- Parker's

=== Germany ===
- Ditsch

=== United States ===
- Auntie Anne's
- Dot's Homestyle Pretzels
- Federal Pretzel Baking Company
- Hot Sam
- J & J Snack Foods Corporation (SuperPretzel)
- Nabisco (Mister Salty)
- Pretzelmaker
- Rold Gold
- Snyder's of Hanover
- SuperPretzel
- Utz Quality Foods (Utz pretzels)
- Wetzel's Pretzels
- Wise Foods (Quinlan)

== See also ==
- List of food companies
- List of brand name food products
