= SuperPretzel =

Frozen pretzel brand

SuperPretzel is a brand of frozen pretzels marketed by J & J Snack Foods Corporation Pennsauken Township, New Jersey. The basic product is a box containing 6 pretzels, which are designed to be heated in either the oven or microwave, as well as a packet of salt to add to the pretzels.

== History ==
In 1971, Gerry Shreiber bought a struggling pretzel company in bankruptcy court for about $70,000. Shreiber's plan was to market soft pretzels to sports stadiums, which at the time had a limited menu. To build a display case, Shreiber used several metal hooks arranged in the shape of a tree, and built a glass case around it. He coined the name "SuperPretzel" due to his love of Superman.

== Operations ==
SuperPretzel products are available across a number of retail chains in the United States and Canada including Target, Walmart, Safeway, Fred Meyer, QFC, Kmart, Winn-Dixie, Key Food, WinCo Foods, Albertsons, and Food Universe. Their products are also sold online by Instacart, Amazon Fresh, FreshDirect, Peapod, Gopuff, and Shipt.A
