= Covrigi =

Romanian baked goods similar to pretzels

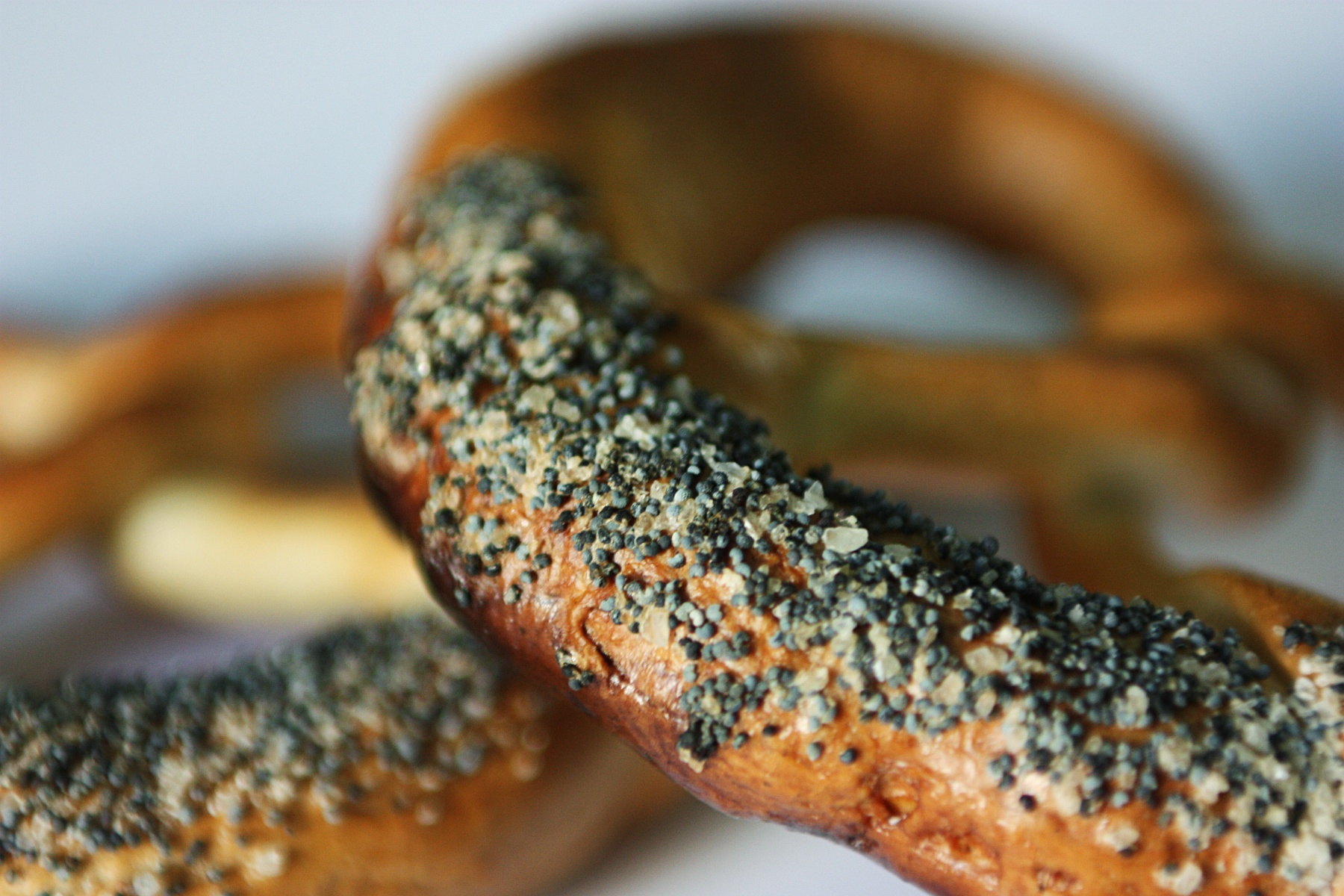
- Type: Bread
- Place of origin: Romania
- Main ingredients: Flour, water, poppy seeds or sesame seeds or large salt grains

Covrigi (Romanian pronunciation: [koˈvridʒʲ]) are Romanian baked goods similar to pretzels. They consist of salted bread topped with poppy seeds, sesame seeds or large salt grains. They do not usually contain any added sweeteners such as sugar.

Covrigi is the plural form of the Romanian word covrig. The word kovrig is a loanword from the Old Bulgarian kovrigъ. Cognate words are found in other Slavic languages, e.g. Russian kovriga (коврига) meaning "round bread" or korovai. The Old East Slavic kovriga is mentioned in the Primary Chronicle under year 1074. Its ultimate etymological origin is uncertain.

Covrigi is a popular snack food in urban areas of Romania and also as a holiday gift in rural areas. The city of Buzău is known in Romania for its covrigi.

Although legend has it that covrigi were introduced by Greek merchants to Buzău in the 19th century to increase consumption of their wine, their similarity to German pretzels and to sfințișori, another Romanian pastry, suggests a much earlier origin.

== See also ==
- Simit
