= Speyer Brezelfest =

Annual funfair and beer festival in Germany

Coordinates: 49°18′52″N 8°26′41″E

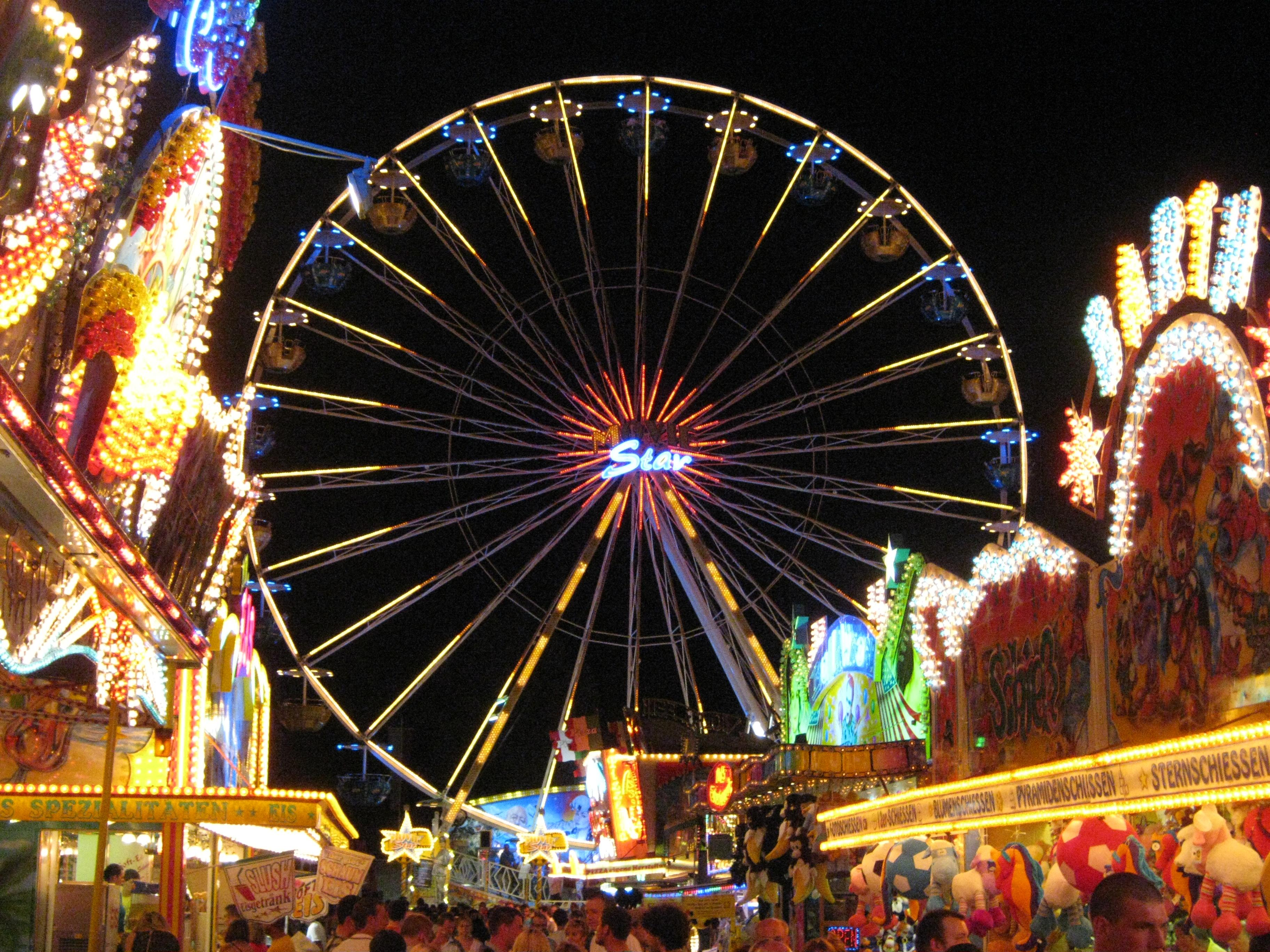
Speyer Brezelfest

The Speyer Brezelfest is an annual Volksfest (beer festival and travelling funfair) in honour of the pretzel in the city of Speyer, Germany, running the second weekend of July from Thursday-evening to Tuesday-night.

== History ==
The festival was initiated in 1910 by the Speyer tourist association to promote the sales of Speyer breweries, pretzel bakers and cigar factories. Today it is the largest beer festival in the Upper Rhine region and attracts about 300,000 visitors. The festivities are officially opened by the mayor on Friday evening, when he taps the first barrel of beer. They include a number of other events, such as contests, a “Brezelfest marathon” (8.2 km), fireworks on Sunday and Tuesday evening and a parade on Sunday with about 100 bands, clubs and floats.
