= Sturgis Pretzel House =

- Julius Sturgis Pretzel House
- U.S. National Register of Historic Places
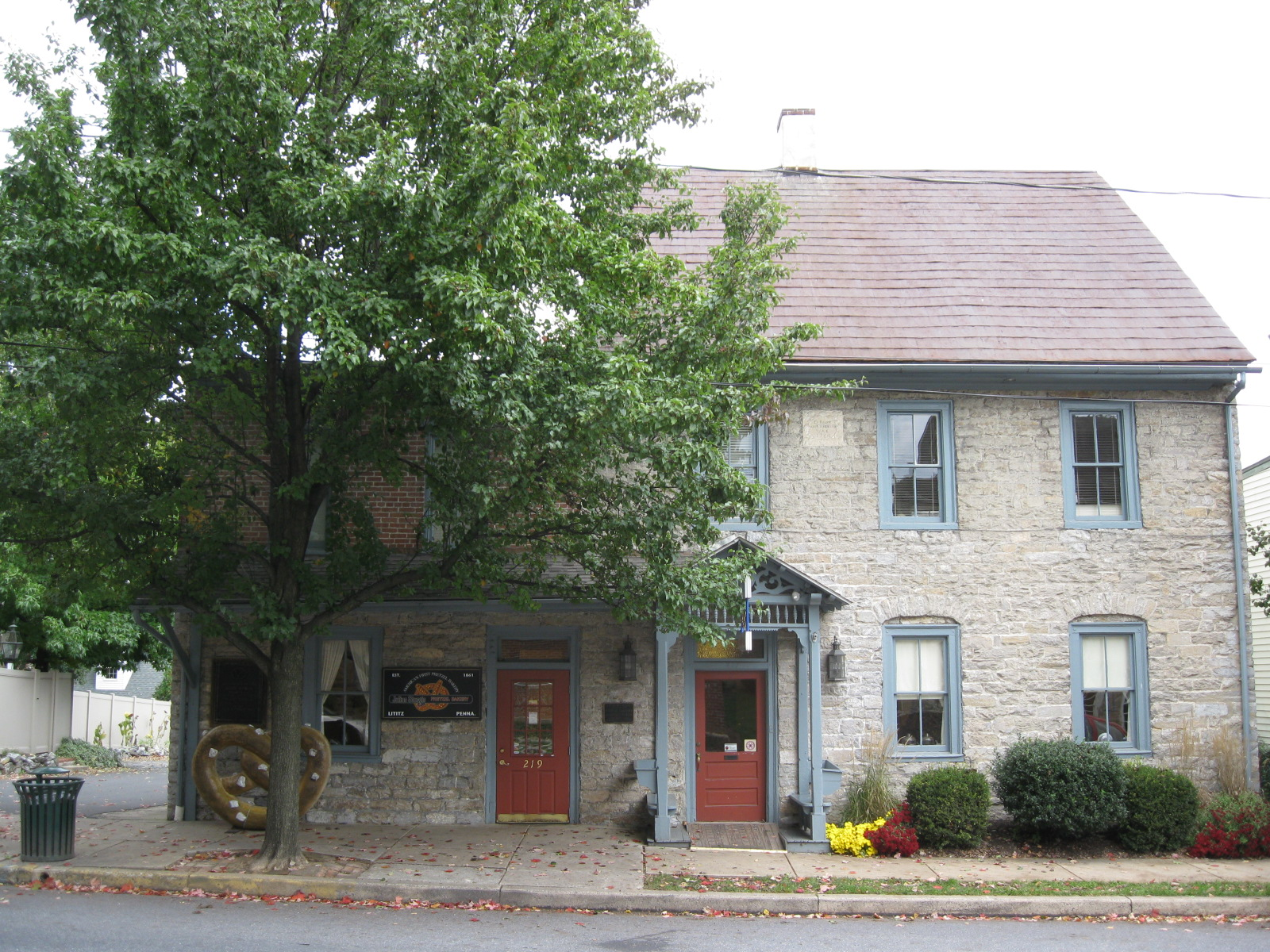
- Sturgis Pretzel House, October 2009

- Location within Pennsylvania Location within the United States
- Location: 219-221 E. Main St., Lititz, Pennsylvania
- Coordinates: 40°9′23″N 76°18′2″W
- Area: less than one acre
- Built: 1784
- Architect: Kreiter, Peter
- NRHP reference No.: 74001789
- Added to NRHP: December 16, 1974

The Sturgis Pretzel House of Lititz, Pennsylvania, founded in 1861, is the oldest commercial pretzel bakery in the United States. The Julius Sturgis Pretzel Bakery remains active in pretzel production and is a tourist attraction.

== History ==
In 1850, Julius Sturgis owned a bread business in Lititz. That year, he provided a homeless man with dinner. According to legend, the homeless man had been on a train that went behind the bread business, and got off the train after seeing the bakery to get food and a job; however, Julius did not have a job available, but nonetheless fed the man. The man in return gave Julius a pretzel recipe. He had never baked pretzels before, so he tested the recipe out on his family and added pretzels to his bakery. By 1861 the recipe had proven to be so popular that Julius stopped his bakery to make pretzels; he started the first commercial pretzel business in the United States.

To this day the Sturgis family still bakes pretzels using the same recipe Julius used to start his pretzel bakery in 1861. Marriott Sturgis, born in 1910, was Julius's grandson. He was nicknamed "Tom Sturgis" because he worked alongside his uncle Tom Keller and they had similar baking styles. Tom's family moved to Reading, Pennsylvania where Tom continued to work in pretzel bakeries, eventually he—with his brother Correll—opened their own pretzel bakery in 1936 called Sturgis Brothers. However, Tom had to close down Sturgis Brothers due to the drafts for World War II.

After serving in a munitions factory during that war, Tom Sturgis continued the pretzel baking industry and opened another bakery called Tom Sturgis Pretzels. The business is still in operation today, run by Tom's grandson, Bruce Sturgis. The Sturgis family also manages Julius Sturgis's original pretzel bakery.

The bakery was visited by children's television host Fred Rogers on a 1981 episode of Mister Rogers' Neighborhood.

== Location ==
Besides being the first commercial pretzel bakery in the United States, the Sturgis Pretzel House has a long history. The building was built in 1784 by a man named Peter Kreiter (original inscription: "Er Bauet Von Peterkreiter") and is one of the original structures in Lititz. The house was built from stones taken from the streets and from the surrounding timber forest; it had windows to fire muskets to prevent against Native American attacks. The Julius Sturgis Pretzel Bakery is on the list of National Register of Historic Places. Since 1850, pretzels have been made in Lititz with a recipe derived from French monasteries.

== See also ==
- List of the oldest buildings in Pennsylvania
