= Federal Pretzel Baking Company =

American soft pretzel manufacturer

- Company type: Subsidiary J&J Snack Foods Corp (since 2001)
- Industry: Commercial bakery
- Founded: Family Owned (1922–2000)
- Headquarters: Original location: 690 Federal Street, Philadelphia, Pennsylvania
- Key people: Nacchio Family
- Products: Pretzels
- Revenue: N/A USD (2010)
- Number of employees: 30+ (2000)
- Website: Federal Pretzel Baking Company

The Federal Pretzel Baking Company of South Philadelphia was the first large-scale mass production soft pretzel manufacturer in Philadelphia.

Philadelphia-style soft pretzels

== History ==
The Federal Pretzel Baking Company began with the Nacchio family's small bakery, which they grew into a large-scale manufacturing business of soft pretzels, using a secret recipe.

1922
Maria and Giuseppe Nacchio owned a small Italian-American Italian artisan bread bakery where Maria made baked-style soft pretzels. The bakery was located in the heart of an Italian-American neighborhood, in South Philadelphia. During the 1920s, her son, Edmund, saw a business opportunity with the popularity of the soft pretzel and the family recipe. He started a factory to bake them in larger quantities. He combined the manual skills of workers hand-twisting the pretzels with a conveyor system of equipment, imported from Germany, that moved the pretzels to a soaking solution and through baking ovens. The mass production operation thereby became the Federal Pretzel Baking Company.

1940
The Department of Agriculture consulted with the American Institute of Baking and other advanced bakers of the United States of America, including the Nacchio family, to address the shortage of wheat flour. During the World War, alternative ingredients and baking techniques were developed. One alternative included using corn flour as a percentage substitute to create a mix of flour(s) for bread and other bakery goods like pretzels.

1947
The company was founded by four brothers. Following the death of Edmund in 1947, Joseph, Carmine, and Anthony continued to run the company.
1963
The record for the largest pretzel ever baked was baked by Joseph Nacchio of the Federal Pretzel Baking Company. It weighed 40 lb (18 kg) and measured five feet across. This record was repeated, with a 20 lb (9.1 kg) four-foot pretzel from Federal appearing in the 1963 Hollywood film production of It's a Mad, Mad, Mad, Mad World.

1978
First mass-machine-produced soft pretzel was extruded at seven per second with 60,000 baked daily by Federal Pretzel Baking Company. The original 1922 recipe continued to be used, but they no longer made hand-twisted pretzels with the signature overlapping knot.

1990
Second-generation daughters Anna Nacchio and Norma Nacchio-Conley (with her son Thomas) opened PretzCo, a pretzel-baking business independent of Federal Pretzel Baking Company. It was located several city blocks away. They included a backroom exhibit to document the family story as presented by the daughters of the founders. They introduced their own modernized recipe that was less crusty and softer.

1992
The Pretzel Museum was opened by Nacchio family member Norma Conley and partner Jean Collins to highlight the area’s preference for Federal Pretzel Baking Company's distinctly shaped pretzels. There were three locations for the museum: it was first located at Washington and Delaware Avenue, then at 3rd and Markets streets next to Ben Franklin's historic house, and finally a fully designed museum was located just north of the historic district of the center of Philadelphia. All of the locations offered full tours of the bakery led by family member Lori Conley and family friend Helene Collins, culminating with the opportunity to twist your own pretzel. Champion hand pretzel twister Helen Hoff demonstrated how to produce 57 pretzels per minute at the first museum dedicated to the Philadelphia soft pretzel. The museum was closed prior to 1995.

2000
The family-owned and -operated company, maintained by various family members for four generations, was sold to a conglomerate business, J&J Snack Foods Pennsauken Township, NJ, in 2000.
