= John Beck =

John Beck is the name of:

== Film ==
- John Beck (actor) (born 1943), American actor
- John Beck (producer) (1909–1993), American film producer
- John Beck Hofmann (born 1969), or John Beck, American film director and screenwriter

== Music ==
- John Beck (It Bites) (born 1961), British musician
- John Beck (songwriter), British songwriter, musician and producer
- John Beck, vocalist in American band The Leaves
- John H. Beck (born 1933), American percussionist and educator
- John Ness Beck (1930–1987), American composer

== Sports ==
- John Beck (gridiron football) (born 1981), American football coach and former quarterback
- John Beck (cricketer) (1934–2000), New Zealand batsman
- John Beck (footballer) (born 1954), English footballer
- John Beck (golfer) (1899–1980), English amateur golfer

== Others ==
- John Beck (reformer) (1883–1962), New Zealand public servant and child welfare reformer
- John Brodhead Beck (1794–1851), New York physician who was an authority on miscarriage, abortion, infant physiology, and associated forensic issues
- John C. Beck (1924–2016), American physician
- John E. Beck (1869–1952), Massachusetts businessman and politician
- John A. Beck (married 1941), husband of Audrey Jones Beck who gave the John A. and Audrey Jones Beck Collection to Museum of Fine Arts, Houston

== See also ==
- John Beck's Boys Academy, 19th-century boarding school in Pennsylvania
- Axel John Beck (1894–1981), United States federal judge
- John Becke (1879–1949), British World War I air commander
