= Jack Hubley =

American newspaper editor, TV show host and naturalist

- Education: Lebanon Valley College
- Occupations: Newspaper editor, naturalist, falconer, educator
- Years active: 1974–present
- Employer(s): WGAL (Lancaster, PA)
- Known for: Host of WGAL's "Call of the Outdoors"; Nationally-syndicated show Wild Moments
- Children: 2
- Awards: WGAL Hall of Fame (2020)

Jack Hubley (born abt 1951) is an American wildlife nature expert, retired TV host, and falconer. He was the host of the nationally-syndicated show Wild Moments. He was also the outdoors editor for the Lancaster Sunday News and the editor of Pennsylvania Wildlife magazine.

== Early life ==
Hubley was raised in Lititz, Pennsylvania. He was the son of Mr & Mrs John A. Hubley Jr. He attended Warwick High School, where as a senior, he made the news when the pet boa constrictor that he brought in for a science project disappeared for 6 months. Hubley graduated from Warwick in 1969 followed by Lebanon Valley College in 1973.

== Career ==
In 1982, Hubley got a job writing a column for the Lancaster Sunday News. In 1989, he became the paper's outdoors editor. In 1985, Hubley also became the editor for the Pennsylvania Wildlife magazine. He joined the local TV station, WGAL, in 1987, becoming the host of the TV show Call of the Outdoors after the previous host left. In 1997, the show was changed to Call of the Outdoors for Kids.

In 2000, he pitched the concept for the show Wild Moments, consisting of wildlife news segments. The show would go onto become nationally-syndicated. In Wild Moments, Hubley introduced users to wildlife species and answered viewers' questions. In 2002, the two last bald eagles in Massachusetts were banded by a State Wildlife Officer on the show. Later that year, the show featured Montana biologists Lance and Jill Morrow and their research on golden eagles.

Hubley also frequently participated in presentations showing birds and other animals. Hubley retired from WGAL in 2017 after 30 years on-air.

Hubley is a master falconer and licensed to hunt with golden eagles. As a master falconer, he has provided advice to academics studying how falcons and hawks pursue prey. He is also the president of the Pennsylvania Falconry and Hawk Trust.

== Personal life ==
Hubley is married with two daughters.
