= Nolan Rucci =

American football player (born 2002)

No. 76 – Indianapolis Colts
- Position: Offensive tackle
- Roster status: Practice squad

Personal information
- Born: August 5, 2002 (age 24); Lititz, Pennsylvania, U.S.
- Listed height: 6 ft 8 in (2.03 m)
- Listed weight: 314 lb (142 kg)

Career information
- High school: Warwick (Lititz, Pennsylvania)
- College: Wisconsin (2021–2023); Penn State (2024–2025)
- NFL draft: 2026: undrafted

Career history
- Indianapolis Colts (2026–present)*
- * Offseason or practice squad member only

Awards and highlights
- Mr. PA Football Lineman (2020)
- Stats at Pro Football Reference

Nolan Rucci (born August 5, 2002) is an American professional football offensive tackle for the Indianapolis Colts of the National Football League (NFL). He played college football for the Wisconsin Badgers and Penn State Nittany Lions.

== Early life ==
Rucci attended Warwick High School. He was rated as a five-star recruit, the 5th best offensive tackles, and the 14th overall prospect in the class of 2021. Rucci committed to play college football for the Wisconsin Badgers over offers from school such as Clemson, Michigan, Notre Dame, Penn State, and Washington.

== College career ==
=== Wisconsin ===
After taking a redshirt season in 2021, Rucci played in three games for the Badgers in 2022. In week 8 of the 2023 season, he caught the game-winning touchdown on a trick play to help the Badgers beat Illinois. During the 2023 season, Rucci appeared in three games for the Badgers including playing most of the snaps in the team's bowl game due to an injury to starter Jack Nelson. After the season, Rucci entered his name into the NCAA transfer portal.

=== Penn State ===
Rucci transferred to play for the Penn State Nittany Lions.

== Professional career ==
Pre-draft measurables
Height	Weight	Arm length	Hand span	Wingspan	40-yard dash	10-yard split	20-yard split	20-yard shuttle	Three-cone drill	Vertical jump	Broad jump
6 ft 8 3/8 in (2.04 m)	314 lb (142 kg)	34 in (0.86 m)	10 3/8 in (0.26 m)	6 ft 11 1/2 in (2.12 m)	5.45 s	1.92 s	3.04 s	4.87 s	7.89 s	30.0 in (0.76 m)	9 ft 0 in (2.74 m)
All values from Pro Day

After not being selected in the 2026 NFL draft, Rucci signed with the Indianapolis Colts as an undrafted free agent. On August 30, 2026, Rucci was waived by Indianapolis as a part of final roster cuts; he was re-signed to the team's practice squad the next day.

== Personal life ==
Rucci is the son of former NFL offensive lineman Todd Rucci, and All-American field hockey player Stacey Rucci. He is the grandson of Tom Gilburg, who also played in the NFL. He also played with his brother Hayden at Wisconsin for three seasons.
