= Hayden Rucci =

American football player (born 2001)

No. 47 – Philadelphia Eagles
- Position: Tight end
- Roster status: Practice squad

Personal information
- Born: January 27, 2001 (age 25); Lititz, Pennsylvania, U.S.
- Listed height: 6 ft 5 in (1.96 m)
- Listed weight: 247 lb (112 kg)

Career information
- High school: Warwick (Lititz, Pennsylvania)
- College: Wisconsin (2019–2023)
- NFL draft: 2024: undrafted

Career history
- Miami Dolphins (2024–2025); Detroit Lions (2025); Miami Dolphins (2025)*; San Francisco 49ers (2025)*; Jacksonville Jaguars (2026)*; Los Angeles Chargers (2026); Philadelphia Eagles (2026–present)*
- * Offseason or practice squad member only

Career NFL statistics as of Week 5, 2026
- Games played: 7
- Receptions: 1
- Receiving yards: 7
- Receiving touchdowns: 1
- Stats at Pro Football Reference

Hayden Rucci (born January 27, 2001) is an American professional football tight end for the Philadelphia Eagles of the National Football League (NFL). He played college football for the Wisconsin Badgers and was signed by the Miami Dolphins as an undrafted free agent in 2024.

== Early life ==
Rucci was born on January 27, 2001, the son of former NFL player Todd Rucci. His grandfather, Tom Gilburg, also played in the NFL. He grew up in Lancaster County, Pennsylvania, and attended Warwick High School in Lititz, where he played football. A tight end, he was known for his blocking ability and also had 19 receptions for 376 yards and three touchdowns as a junior, while posting 30 catches for 645 yards and eight scores as a senior. In both years, he was named first-team All-Lancaster-Lebanon League. Rucci helped Warwick to the Section One championship as a senior and was selected to the Big 33 all-star game, which his father had also played in. He finished his stint at Warwick with 58 receptions for 1,129 yards and 12 touchdowns. A four-star recruit, he committed to play college football for the Wisconsin Badgers.

== College career ==
At Wisconsin, Rucci played alongside his brother Nolan, an offensive lineman. He redshirted as a true freshman at Wisconsin in 2019, then appeared in six games during the 2020 season. He played in six games again during the 2021 season, being limited by a foot injury. He became a starter during the 2022 season, starting eight of 10 games while posting six receptions for 75 yards and a touchdown, which was scored in the 2022 Guaranteed Rate Bowl. In his last year, 2023, he led the team's tight ends with 11 receptions for 125 yards. Although he had an extra year of eligibility remaining, he opted to enter the NFL draft, finishing his stint at Wisconsin with 17 catches for 200 yards and a touchdown.

== Professional career ==
Pre-draft measurables
| Height | Weight | Arm length | Hand span | Wingspan | 40-yard dash | 10-yard split | 20-yard split | 20-yard shuttle | Three-cone drill | Vertical jump | Broad jump | Bench press |
|---|---|---|---|---|---|---|---|---|---|---|---|---|
| 6 ft 4 3/4 in (1.95 m) | 247 lb (112 kg) | 31 3/4 in (0.81 m) | 10 1/2 in (0.27 m) | 6 ft 7 in (2.01 m) | 5.02 s | 1.84 s | 2.89 s | 4.40 s | 7.53 s | 32.0 in (0.81 m) | 9 ft 7 in (2.92 m) | 19 reps |
All values from Pro Day

=== Miami Dolphins ===
After going unselected in the 2024 NFL draft, Rucci signed with the Miami Dolphins as an undrafted free agent. In preseason, he led the team with seven catches for 57 yards, scoring a touchdown in the third preseason game. He was waived on August 27, 2024, then re-signed to the practice squad the next day. He was released on October 23, re-signed to the practice squad on November 13, and released again on December 24, before signing a reserve/future contract with the team after the season, on January 9, 2025.

On August 26, 2025, Rucci was waived by the Dolphins as part of final roster cuts and then re-signed to the practice squad the next day. Rucci was elevated to the active roster for the team's Week 8 game against the Atlanta Falcons and made his NFL debut in the game, posting a tackle. He was signed to the active roster on November 8, then waived on November 29.

=== Detroit Lions ===
On December 1, 2025, Rucci was claimed off waivers by the Detroit Lions. He was waived on December 10.

=== Miami Dolphins (second stint) ===
On December 12, 2025, Rucci was re-signed to the Miami Dolphins' practice squad.

=== San Francisco 49ers ===
On January 14, 2026, Rucci was signed to the San Francisco 49ers' practice squad. Rucci signed a reserve/future contract with San Francisco on January 22.

On August 30, 2026, Rucci was waived by the 49ers as a part of final roster cuts.

=== Jacksonville Jaguars ===
On September 1, 2026, Rucci signed with the Jacksonville Jaguars' practice squad.

=== Los Angeles Chargers ===
On September 22, 2026, Rucci was signed by the Los Angeles Chargers off of the Jaguars' practice squad. On November 10, he was waived.

=== Philadelphia Eagles ===
On November 16, 2026, Rucci was signed to the Philadelphia Eagles practice squad.

== Personal life ==
Rucci's brother Nolan also played at Wisconsin.
