= Warwick High School =

Warwick High School may refer to:

- Warwick High School (Pennsylvania) in Lititz, Lancaster County, Pennsylvania
- Warwick High School (Virginia) in Newport News, Virginia
