= Mary Penry =

Mary Penry (12 November 1735 — 17 May 1804) was a Welsh-born woman in colonial Pennsylvania. As a longtime member of the Moravian community at Lititz, she served as "diarist, accountant and guide" for the single sisters' house.

== Early life ==
Mary Penry was born at Abergavenny, the daughter of Hugh and Mary (Stocker) Penry. She left Wales with her widowed mother as a young girl, in about 1744. They moved in with Mary Stocker Penry's married sister and her husband, in Philadelphia, Pennsylvania. Mary Penry was educated with Elizabeth Drinker and Hannah Callender as a young woman. Penry converted to Moravianism and left Philadelphia in 1756, but maintained an ongoing correspondence with her schoolmates for decades.

== In colonial Pennsylvania ==
Unhappy in her stepfather's home, Miss Penry moved to the Sisters' House at Bethlehem, Pennsylvania, in 1756, at the suggestion of artist and preacher John Valentine Haidt. In 1762, she moved again, to the Moravian community at Lititz, Pennsylvania. There she served the community as Schreiber (records keeper) and as Fremden-dienerin (guide for visitors to the community).

She died in 1804, from bronchitis, age 68.

Mary Penry's letters home from Pennsylvania to her Welsh cousins were detailed and personal, as seen in this physical description of herself in middle age:

"I have most excellent eyes for use--but not for beauty--dark grey--am near-sighted yet not so much as to hold my work close to my nose. I am always taken to be younger than I really am; as I am plump the wrinkles are not so visible as they would be were I lean and haggard."

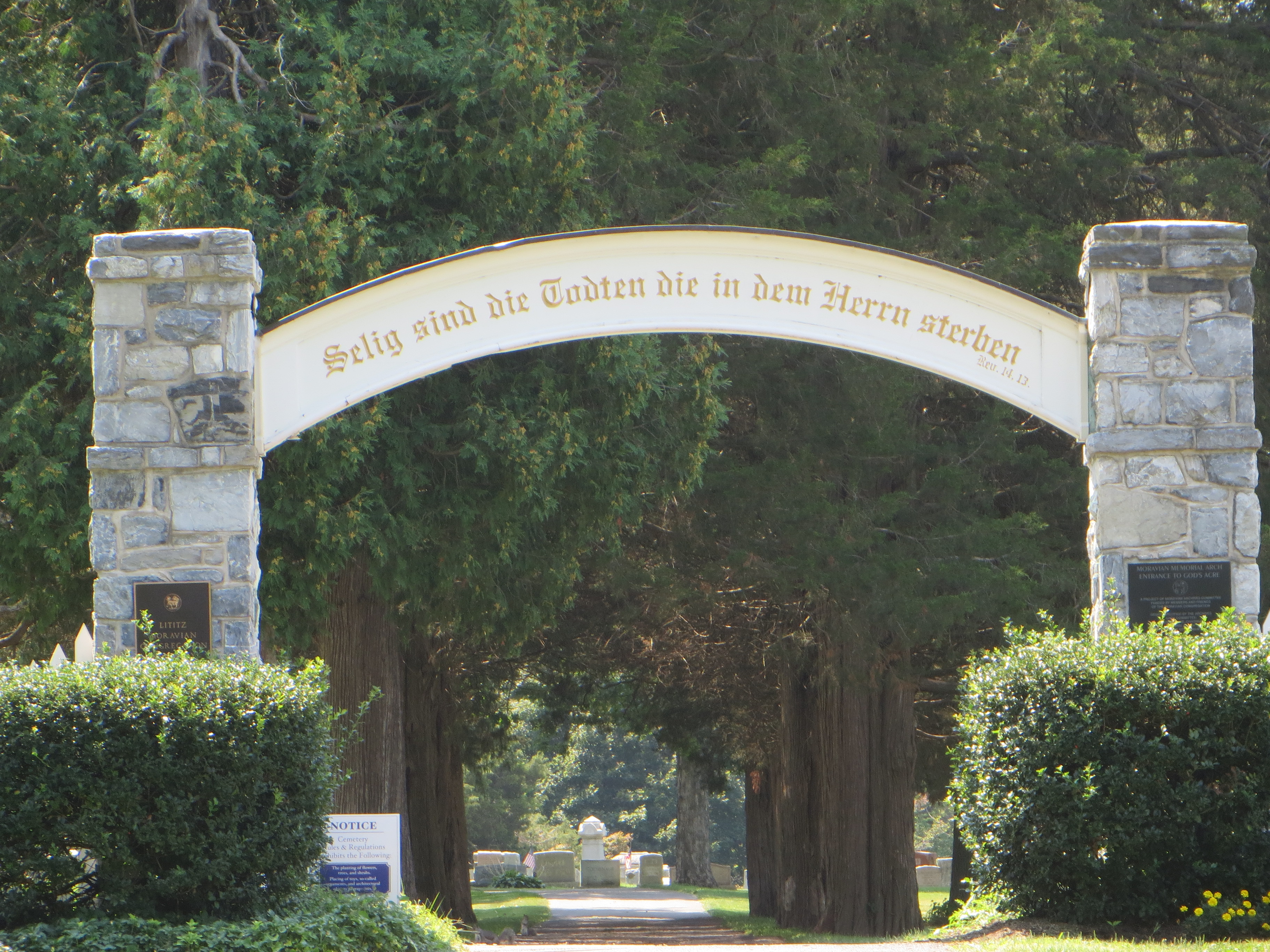
Lititz Moravian Cemetery, location of Mary Penry's grave

The letters also show a close familiarity with music, especially as taught at the Linden Hall School during her active years. Her surviving letters, many of which are now in the collection of the National Library of Wales, are among the best manuscript sources on Moravian life in eighteenth-century America. The choir diaries that she kept, which span forty years, are in the Moravian Archives at Bethlehem, Pennsylvania.

The Single Sisters' Residence where Penry lived is still standing and part of the Lititz Moravian Historic District. Mary Penry is one of the historical figures re-enacted in the Candelight Cemetery Tour at Lititz.

Her surviving letters, some 75 in all, have been collected and edited by Scott Paul Gordon as The Letters of Mary Penry: A Single Moravian Woman in Early America (Pennsylvania State University Press, 2018).
