= Linden Hall (school) =

Linden Hall School for Girls
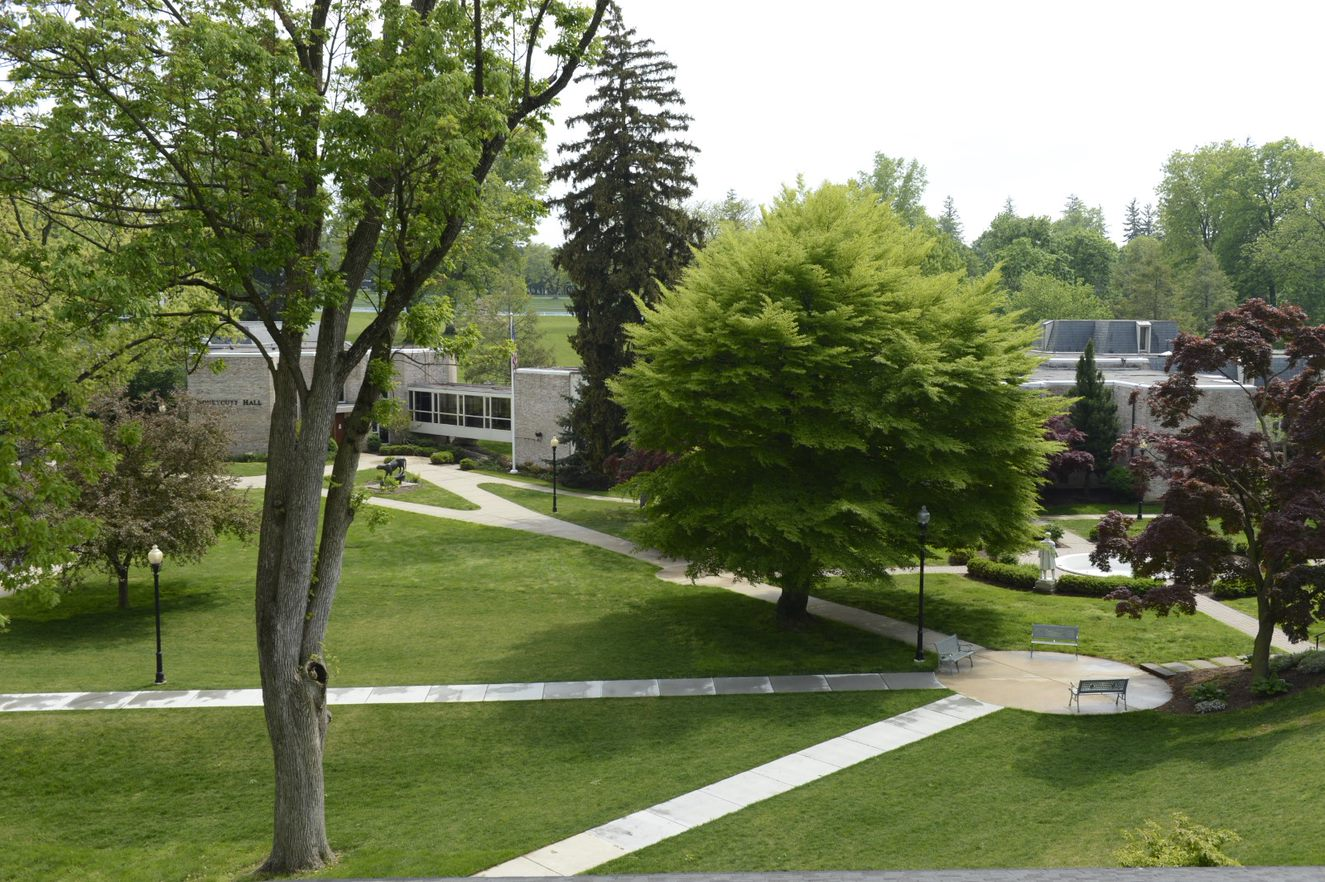

Location
- 212 East Main Street; Lititz, Lancaster, Pennsylvania 17543-2029; United States
- 40.15649°N 76.30250°W

Information
- Former name: Lititz Seminary
- Type: Independent boarding & day school
- Motto: Latin: non scholae sed vitae discimus (We do not learn for school, but life.)
- Established: November 1746; 279 years ago
- Status: Currently operational
- CEEB code: 392295
- NCES School ID: 01197774
- Head of school: Dr. Shauna Carter (as of 2025)
- Faculty: 25.1 (on an FTE basis)
- Grades: 6–12
- Gender: All-female
- Enrollment: 123 (2022-2023)
  - Grade 6: 6
  - Grade 7: 8
  - Grade 8: 14
  - Grade 9: 17
  - Grade 10: 22
  - Grade 11: 26
  - Grade 12: 28
- Student to teacher ratio: 8.2
- Hours in school day: 7
- Campus size: 49 acres (20 ha)
- Campus type: Suburban
- Colors: Blue & White
- Nickname: Lady Lions
- Publication: Echo
- Newspaper: The Linden Ledger
- Annual tuition: $62,696
- Affiliations: NAIS, & TABS
- Website: lindenhall.org

Linden Hall School for Girls is an independent boarding and day school for girls in grades 6–12 located in Lititz, Pennsylvania. The school was founded in 1746 and is the oldest girls' boarding and day school in continuous operation in the United States.

== History ==
Linden Hall traces its history to November 1746, when a Moravian congregation was established in Lititz. The congregation's original building was a "Gemeinhaus," a log structure that could serve as a combined chapel, schoolhouse, and parsonage. The school educated both boys and girls. As of 1758, it reportedly enrolled "70 to 77 children." Brethren's and Sisters' Houses were built by the Moravian congregation between 1758 and 1761 to separate the activities and education of the community's unmarried men and women. The school took down the original Gemeinhaus building in 1766. For the next few years, girls' schooling occurred in the Sisters' House, while boys' schooling was closely associated with the Brethren's House. Church diaries from this period mention that girls from Moravian families in Lancaster (several miles from Lititz) were enrolling in the school and boarding with local families. The local Moravian congregation was a country congregation whose members lived on scattered farms, so some of their daughters likely boarded at the school or nearby due to its distance from their homes. In May 1769, the cornerstone was laid for a new building for the girls' school to accommodate a growing student body. This building, now named Stengel Hall, is still standing as of 2020. The school's first recorded non-Moravian boarding student, Margaret "Peggy" Marvel of Baltimore, Maryland, was enrolled in 1794.

The school's name was changed from Lititz Seminary to Linden Hall in 1883. The new name referred to plantings of basswood (linden) trees on the campus.

The John Beck's Boys Academy, now defunct, was also related to the Moravian church schools established in Lititz in the 1700s.

Linden Hall added a junior college, Linden Hall Junior College, in 1935. Its offerings included a secretarial program. The school discontinued the Junior College in 1961.

The school's weekly chapel services are held in the Lititz Moravian Church and incorporate "readings, commentaries, and music that represent many of the major philosophies and religions" along with the "School's Moravian heritage".

== Curriculum ==
Linden Hall aims its curriculum at college preparation. Extracurricular activity offerings include an equestrian program. Team sports include soccer, tennis, volleyball, riding, cross country, golf, basketball, archery, and dance. A cooperative program with Warwick High School enables Linden Hall students to participate in field hockey, lacrosse, swimming, track and field, softball, and bowling teams. Upper school students can participate in an aviation program through which they can earn a pilot's license.
