= Louise Adeline Weitzel =

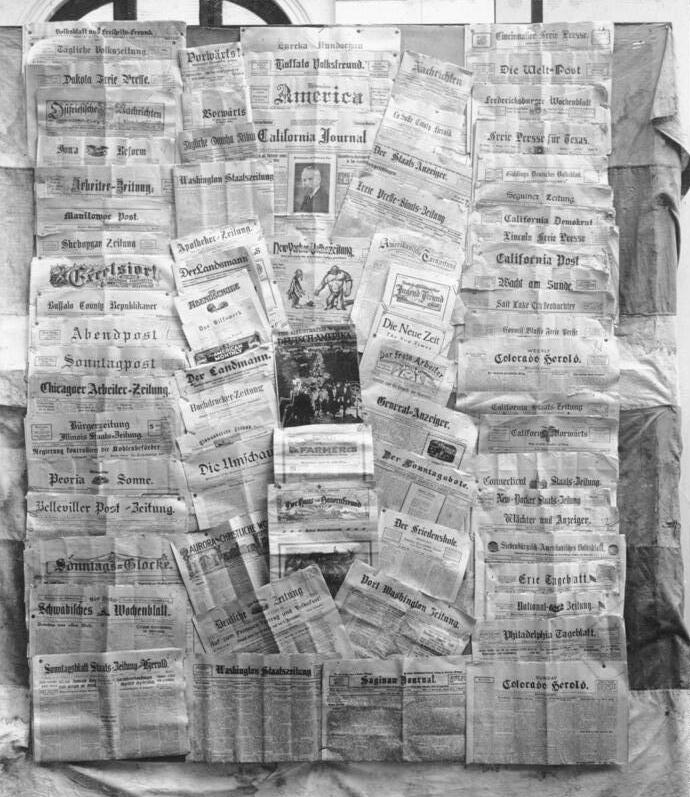
German-language newspapers in North America in 1922

Louise Adeline Weitzel (December 2, 1862 – May 6, 1934) was an American writer of German descent. She was born in Green Bay, Wisconsin. Her family moved to Lititz, Pennsylvania while she was still young.

Given the socio-cultural context in which she was born and raised, her work is unique, not only because of the content of her writing per se but also because she produced and published her texts as a woman and in her native German dialect (Pennsilfaanisch Deitsch) in the United States.

Her will, only 30 words long, left her $855 estate to the Moravian Home for Aged Women in Lititz.

== Education and professional life ==
Louise A. Weitzel obtained her education at Sunnyside Kollitsch and at the Linden Hall Seminary for girls. Later she would work for local German-language newspapers where she ultimately found a vehicle to her voice as a poet. In 1908 she published the book A Quiver of Arrows: Poems by Louise A. Weitzel.

== Religious life ==
Louise A. Weitzel was an active member of the Herrnhuter Brüdergemeine/Moravian Church fellowship, a Christian reformist movement that preceded the German Protestant Martin Luther in Europe by more than a century, with the work initiated by John Huss and revived by Count Nicholas von Zinzendorf.

== Poems ==
Die Grummler

En deel Leit grummle immerhie,
Sie grumble Daag un Nacht.
Uff Gut's un Scheen's in daere Welt
Gewwe sie gar kee Acht.

Im Summer iss es gans zu hees,
Im Winter gans zu kalt;
Die Yunge sin yo gans zu yung,
Die Alde gans zu alt.

Wann's reggert iss der Grund zu nass,
Wann's drucke, zu voll Schtaab;
Im Winter sin die Beem zu darr,
Im Summer zu voll Laab.

Die schmaerde Leit sin gans zu schmaert,
Die dumme gans zu dumm;
Die Schtrosse sin aa gans zu graad,
Die Leens sin gans zu grumm.

'S iss alles letz uff daere Welt,
'S macht niemand gaar nix recht;
Die Mensche traevle schtarck zu Hell,
'S iss alles lass un schlecht.

So Mensche mache kee Mischteecks,
Sie schtehne gans alle;
Sie sehne annere Fehler, yuscht
Ihr eegne duhn net seh.

– Louise A. Weitzel

- Bee
- Der Viert Tschulei
- Die Grummler
- Die Sunn scheint aryeds wo
- Mei Nochber hot en Reedio
- Nackich
- Vum Schiesse
- Siggaretts
- S Wedder
- Was meent's
- Wie zuvor
- Wu fehlt's
- Zu schtarrick

== See also ==
- Pennsylvania Dutch
- Moravian Church
