= The Hess Homestead =

Historic farmstead in Pennsylvania

Coordinates: 40.1538°N 76.2863°W

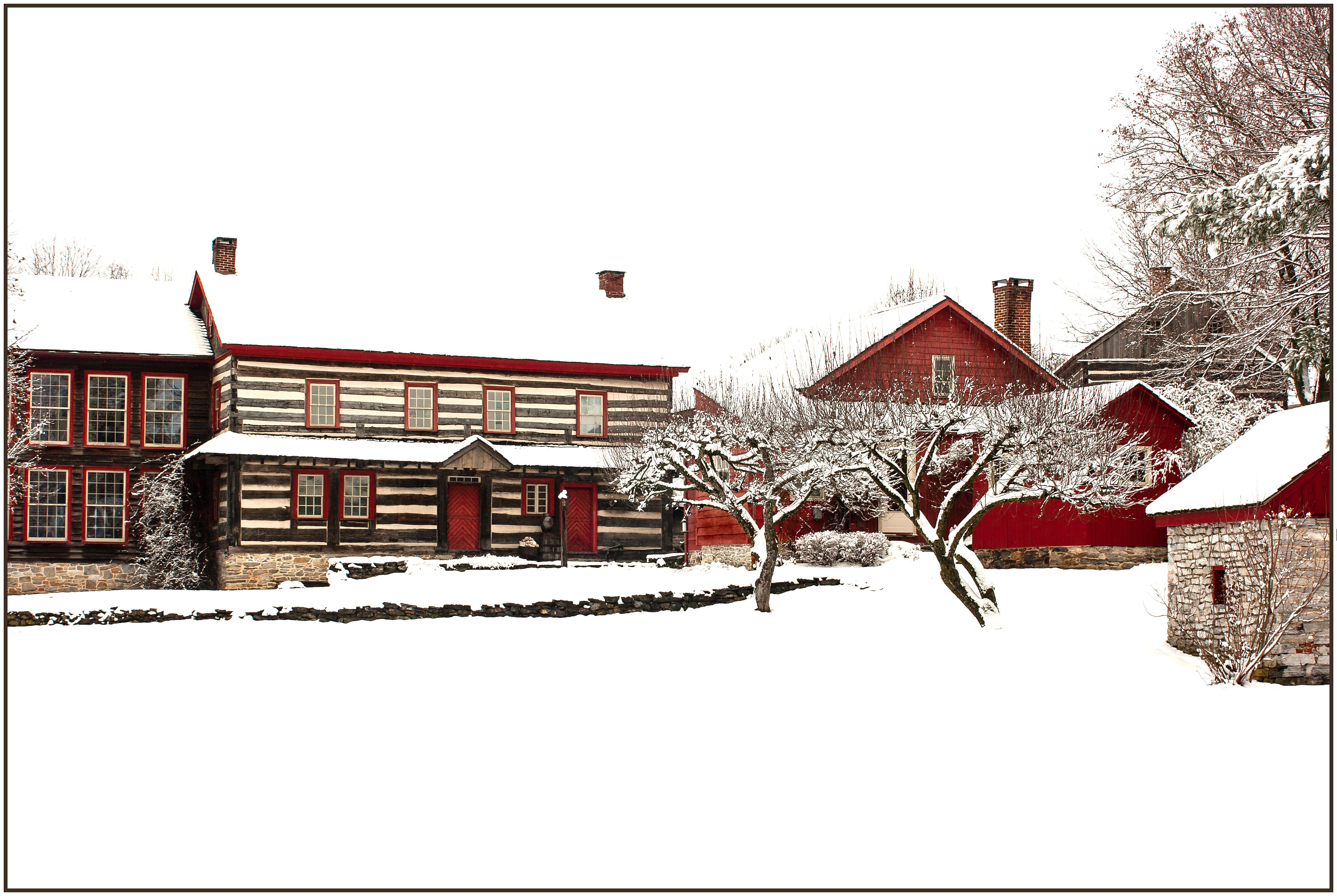
The 1740s log farmhouse, with the summer kitchen, log garage, tool shed, and stone spring house

The Hess Homestead, in Lancaster County, Pennsylvania, is a historic Mennonite farmstead near the town of Lititz. The property is an ancestral home of the Hess family, who purchased the land from William Penn's sons in 1735.

The primary buildings at this site were constructed by the Hess family in the 18th century, including a 1740s log farmhouse, a 1778 stone farmhouse, and a 1769 oil mill. Both houses served as church meeting houses for the local Mennonite community until 1856, when the first Hess Mennonite church building was constructed nearby. The homestead structures survive today, on several adjoining properties, as examples of vernacular architecture of the Pennsylvania Germans.

== Hess family history ==
The farmstead was first surveyed in 1730 as a 200-acre tract for Johannes Hess' grandfather, Hans Hess (ca. 1683-1733). This Hess patriarch immigrated to Pennsylvania in 1717 with his wife Magdalena (ca. 1688-1767) and their children from Germany or Switzerland. Hans and Magdalena are the first Hess immigrants known to arrive in America.

Hans and Magdalena's oldest son Jacob Hess (c. 1706-1741) built the first house on this tract, circa 1730s, with wife Veronica. This Hess family received title to the farm from the William Penn family in 1735.

The present log farmhouse was built ca. 1744 for Jacob's widow Veronica and their children. Their oldest son Johannes (1730-1778) was the next owner, with wife Susanna Landis Hess. In 1784 their eldest son Christian Hess (1757-1816) received this farmstead. Six years later, in 1790, Christian deeded this part of the farm to his brother, John Hess ( 1768-1830), and wife Esther Hershey Hess (1769-1824).

The next farmstead owners were John and Esther Hess' youngest son Henry Hess, and wife Catherine Huber Hess. In turn, their youngest son became the next owner, Mennonite preacher Jonas Hess, with wife Annie Franck Hess, followed by their son Henry F. Hess and wife Anna C. Shenk.

In 1922 the farmstead left the Hess family until 1985 when it was purchased by Clarke E. Hess, a descendant of the immigrant Hans Hess. Clarke Hess spent several years restoring the buildings for use as his residence.

== The 1740s log farmhouse ==
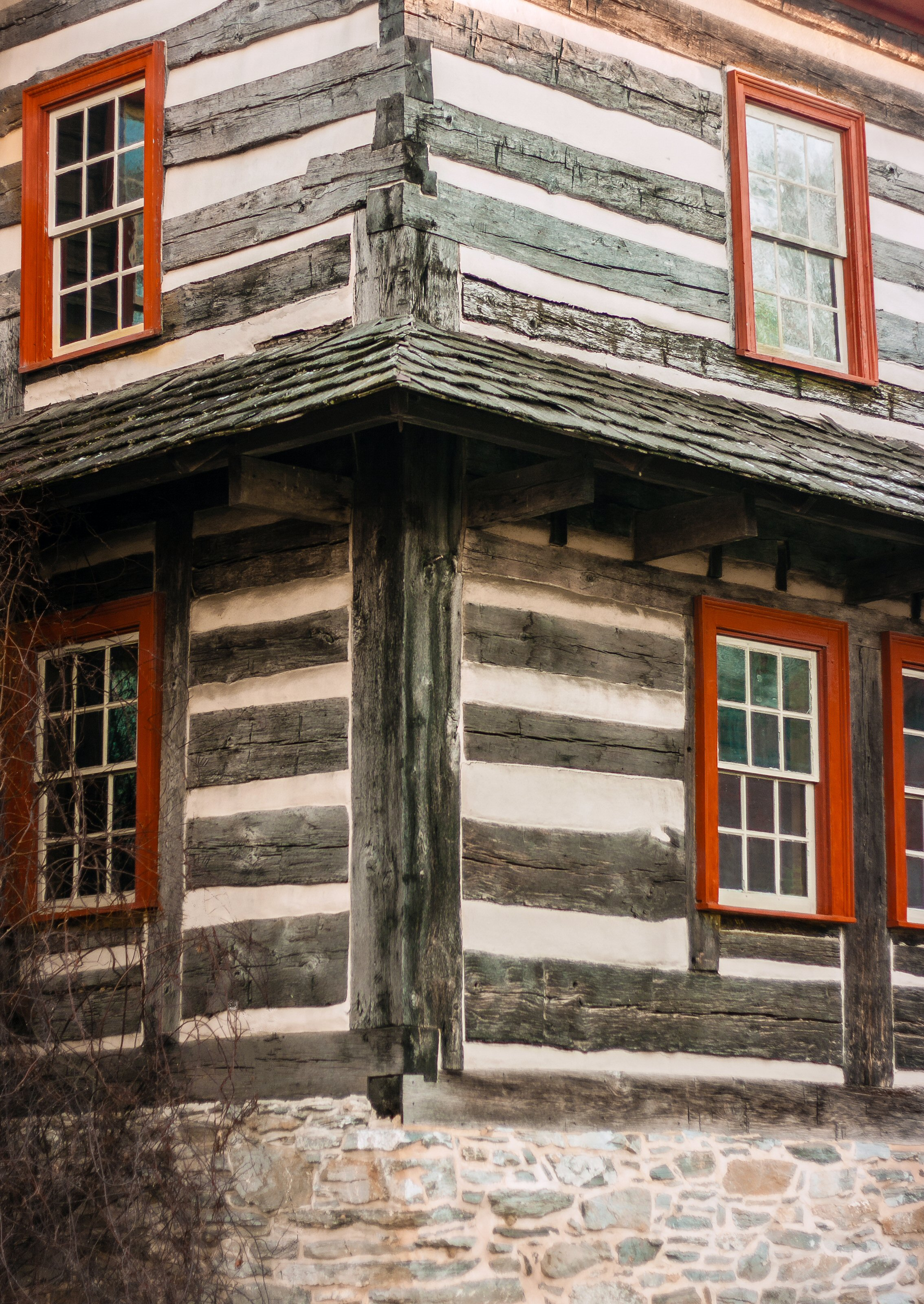
A cornerpost of the log farmhouse

=== The timbering: Blockstanderbau ===
The log farmhouse at the Hess Homestead is constructed with a Germanic architectural technique known as Blockstanderbau, featuring vertical log corner posts, with many other vertical and diagonal timbers.

Colonial Pennsylvania house builders brought corner-post traditions with them from Europe. This form of post-and-beam construction is widespread throughout Germanic Europe.

This corner-post design is unusual for historic Pennsylvania log houses. Most 18th century log houses in Pennsylvania used a V-notch for joining corners, rather than using corner posts. This Hess house is considered one of the most elaborate surviving examples of Blockstanderbau corner-post design.

Blockstanderbau houses are, in effect, half-timbered houses. The horizontal timbers are for infill, rather than for load-bearing support. These horizontals serve the same function as brick infill or wattle-and-daub filler in other half-timber framing.

The Hess log farmhouse originally had 33 vertical posts, of which most survive. The horizontal timbers are tenoned into mortises chiseled into the posts. At each mortise and tenon is a chiseled-in guide symbol, consisting of a Roman numeral or other directional mark. Each corner has two interior diagonal braces. The four corner posts are tenoned into interlocking sill logs.

=== The floorplan: Durchgaengiges Haus ===
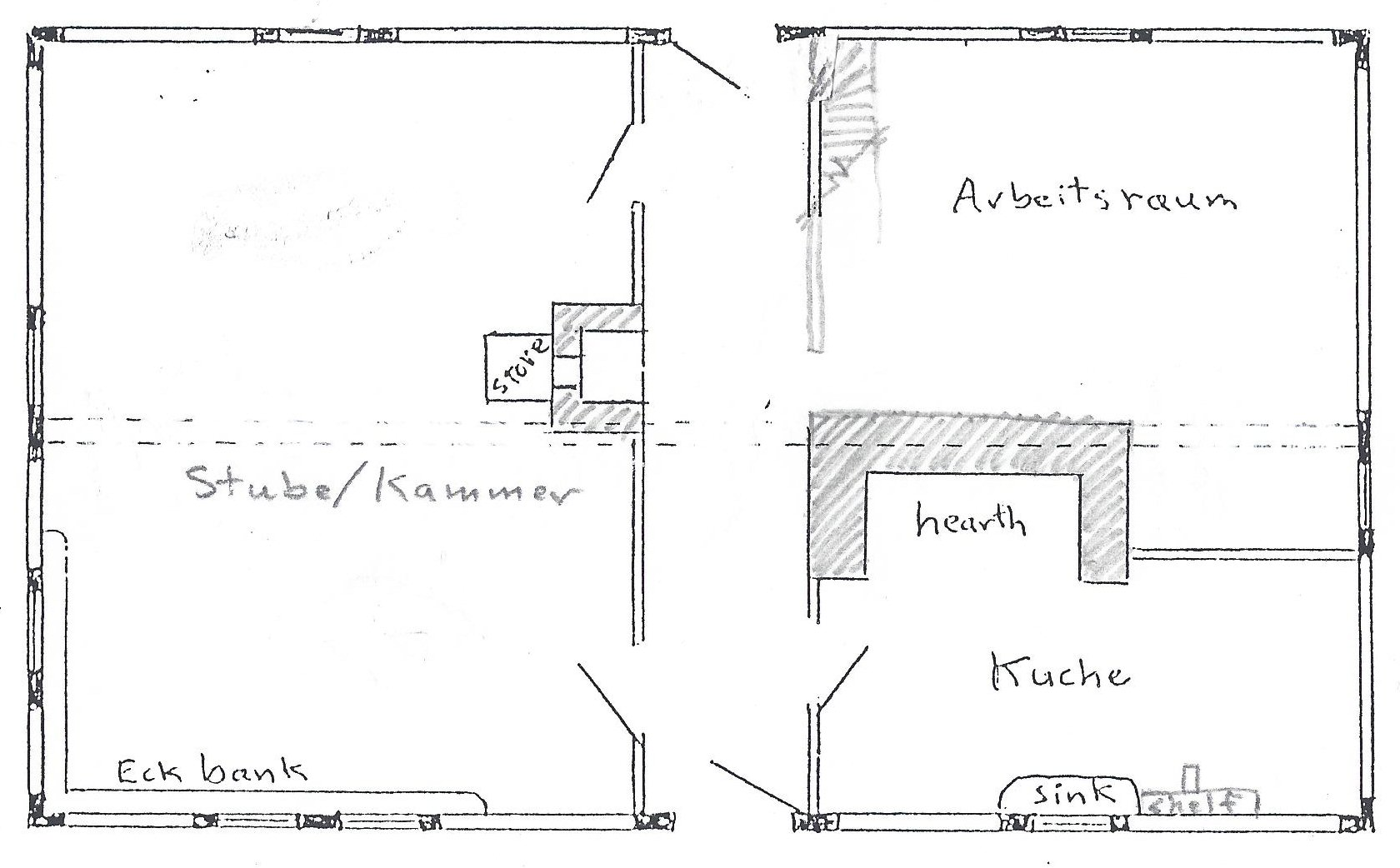
Floorplan of the log farmhouse during its first period in the 1700s

The log farmhouse's primary front door opens into a central hallway which is surrounded by a nonsymmetrical arrangement of interior rooms, including the Kueche (kitchen), Stube (stove room), and Arbeitsraum (work room).

Although this central hallways is suggestive of the English central hallways of Pennsylvania's Georgian houses, this hallway's DNA is more Germanic than British. Architecture historians describe these houses as durchgaengiges Haus (through-passage house). This floorplan has deep roots in Germany's rural architecture. Prototypes for Pennsylvania's durchgaengiges floorplans are illustrated in German books as early as the 17th century.

The Stube (stove room) was heated by a five-plate stove fed from a small fireplace in the central hallway. Beneath the stove room is a vaulted root cellar for food storage. This stove room also served as the Kammer (parents' bedroom).

The second floor's walls were heightened, ca. 1813, to a full story from the original half-story height, using dove-tailed corner timbering. The original, hand-hewn rafters were reused, and a full attic was added, included a Rauchkammer (smoke room) for smoking meats with smoke from the stovepipe.

== The summer kitchen ==
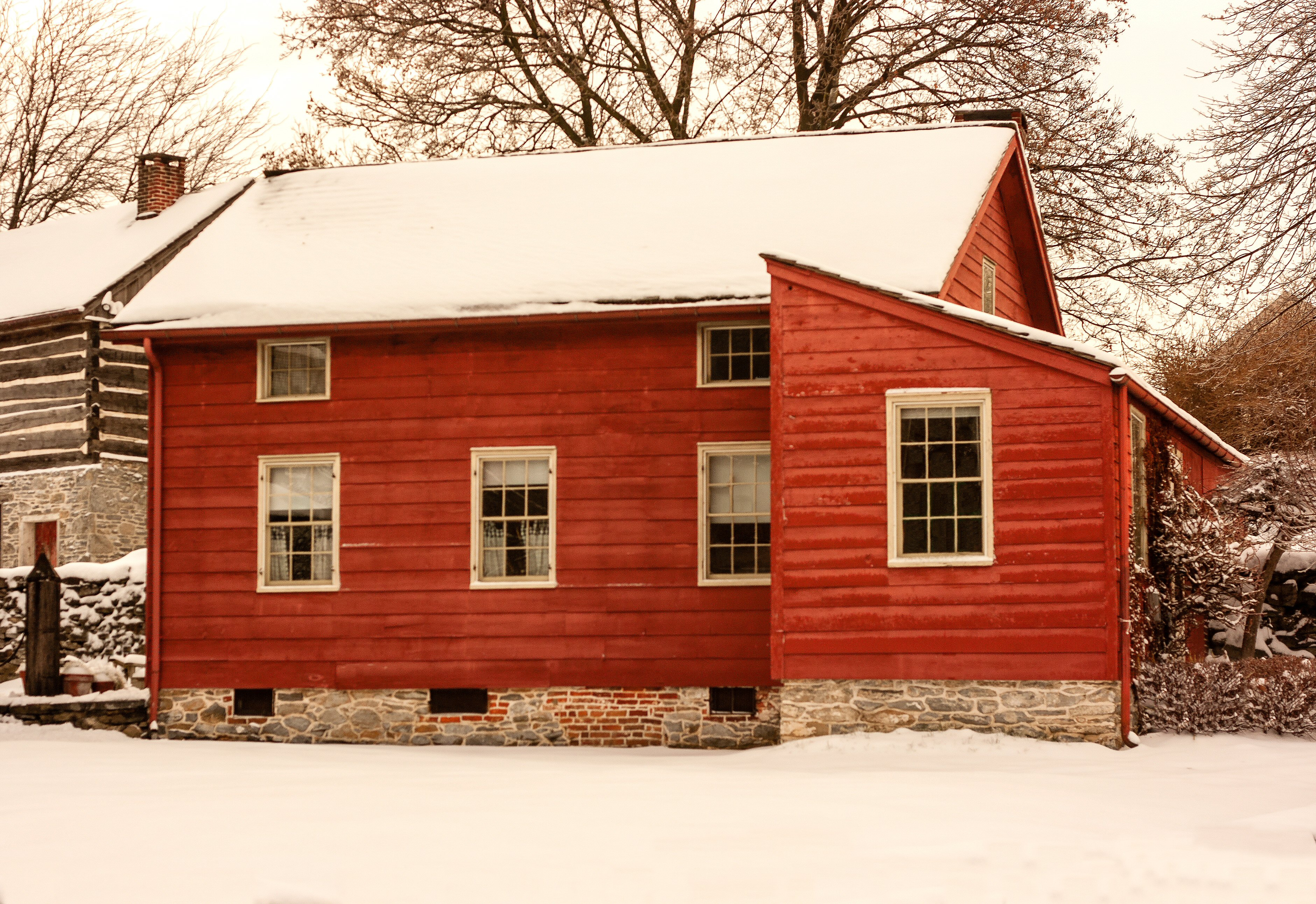
The summer kitchen, built ca. 1850 by Henry and Catherine Hess

This frame building was built ca. 1850, adjoining the log farmhouse. Henry Hess (1794-1867) constructed the building over a vaulted root cellar, which is one of three arch cellars at this homestead. Included in the building is a walk-in fireplace, previously used for butchering, making soap, heating laundry water, etc. A brick squirrel-tail bakeoven was located outside, attached to the fireplace.

A hand pump in the building was used for pumping water from an underground cistern, which stored rain water from the kitchen's roof. Outside the summer kitchen was a windmill to pump water from the well.

== Outbuildings at the log farmhouse ==
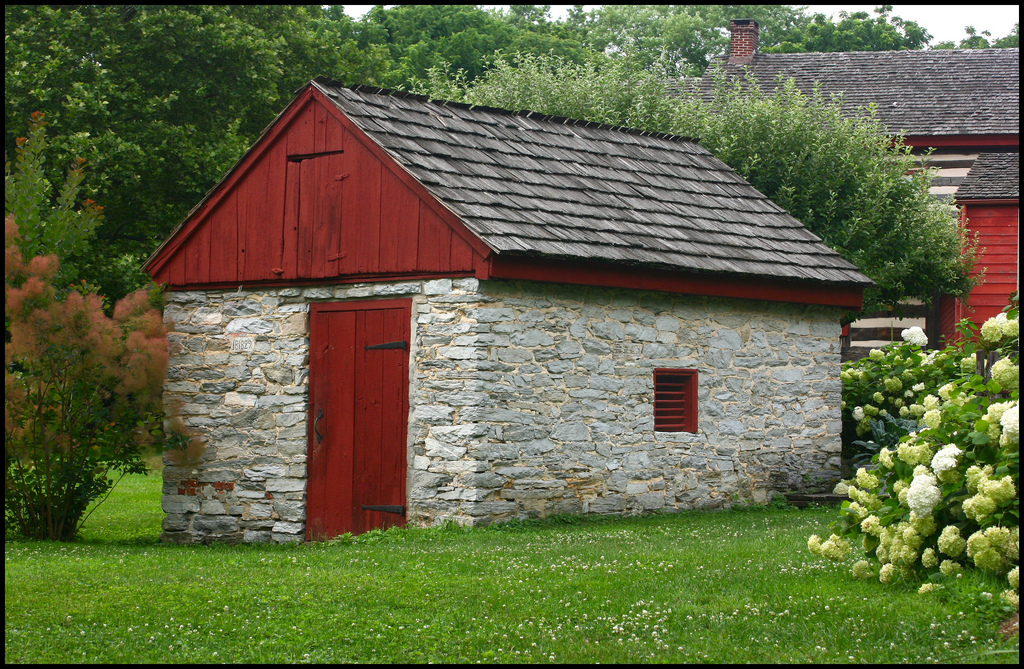
The 1829 springhouse

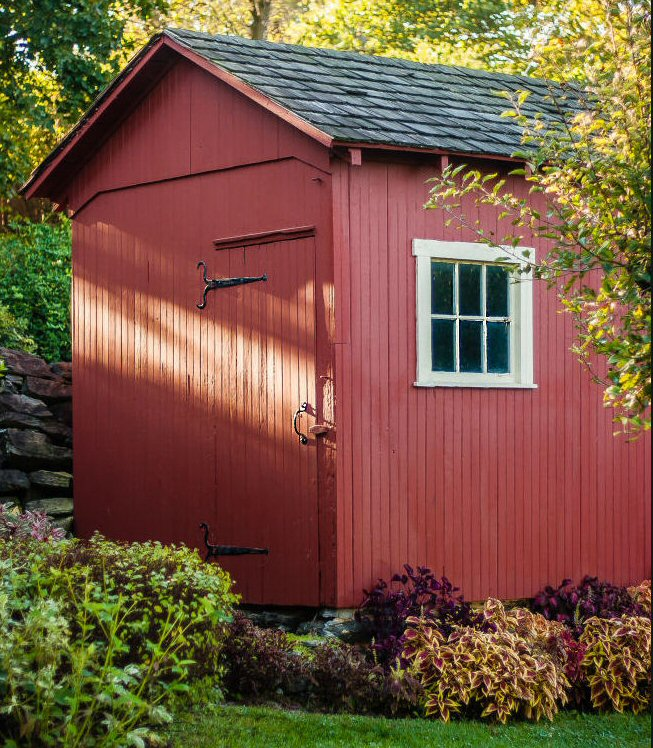
The tool shed

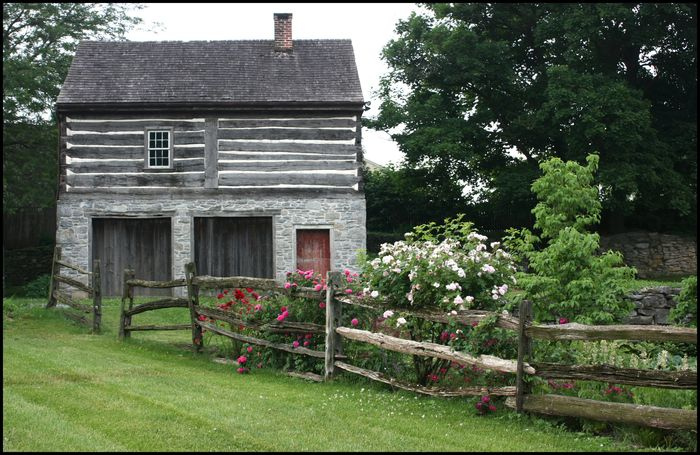
The ca. 1785 log cabin

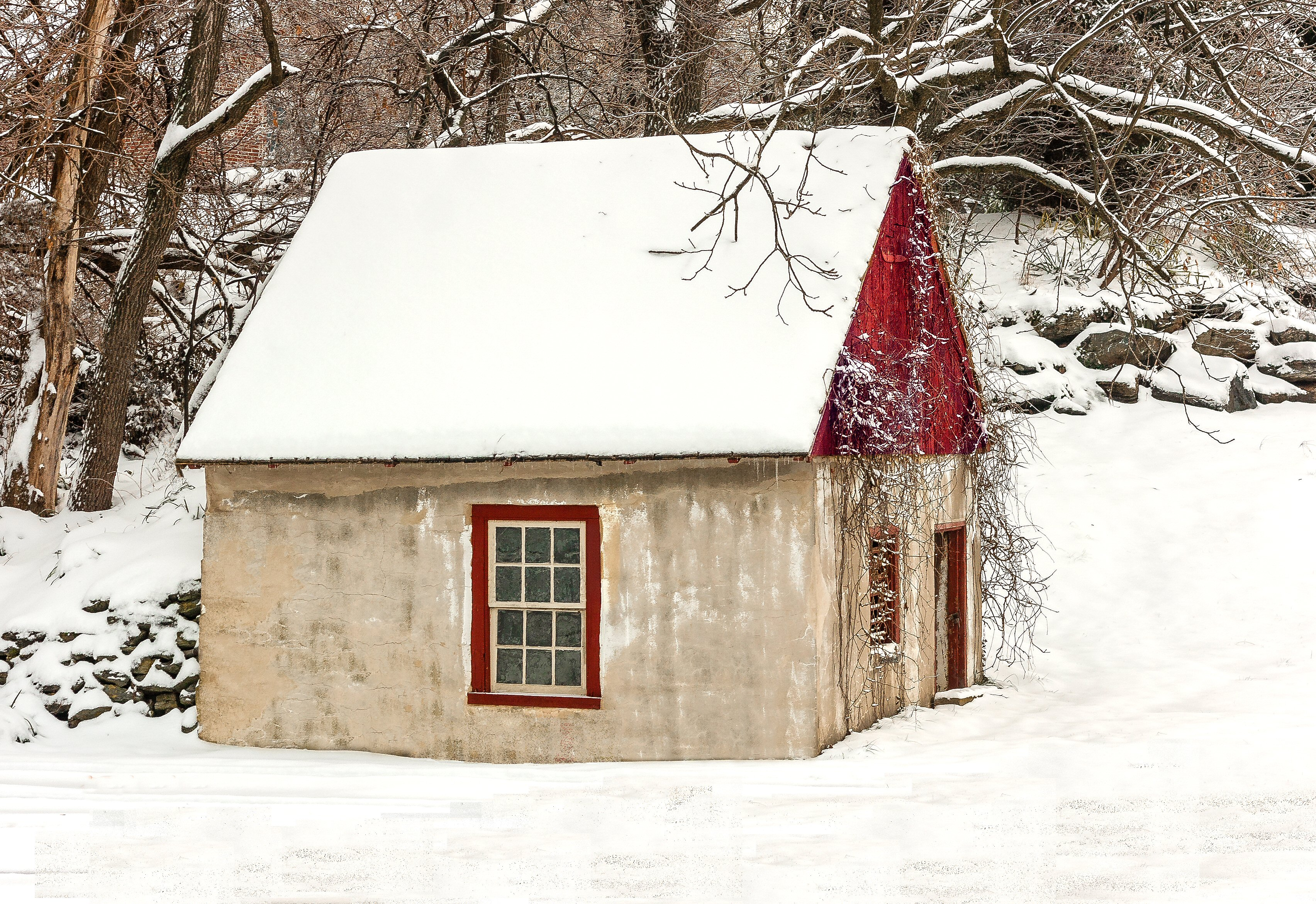
The 1930s springhouse

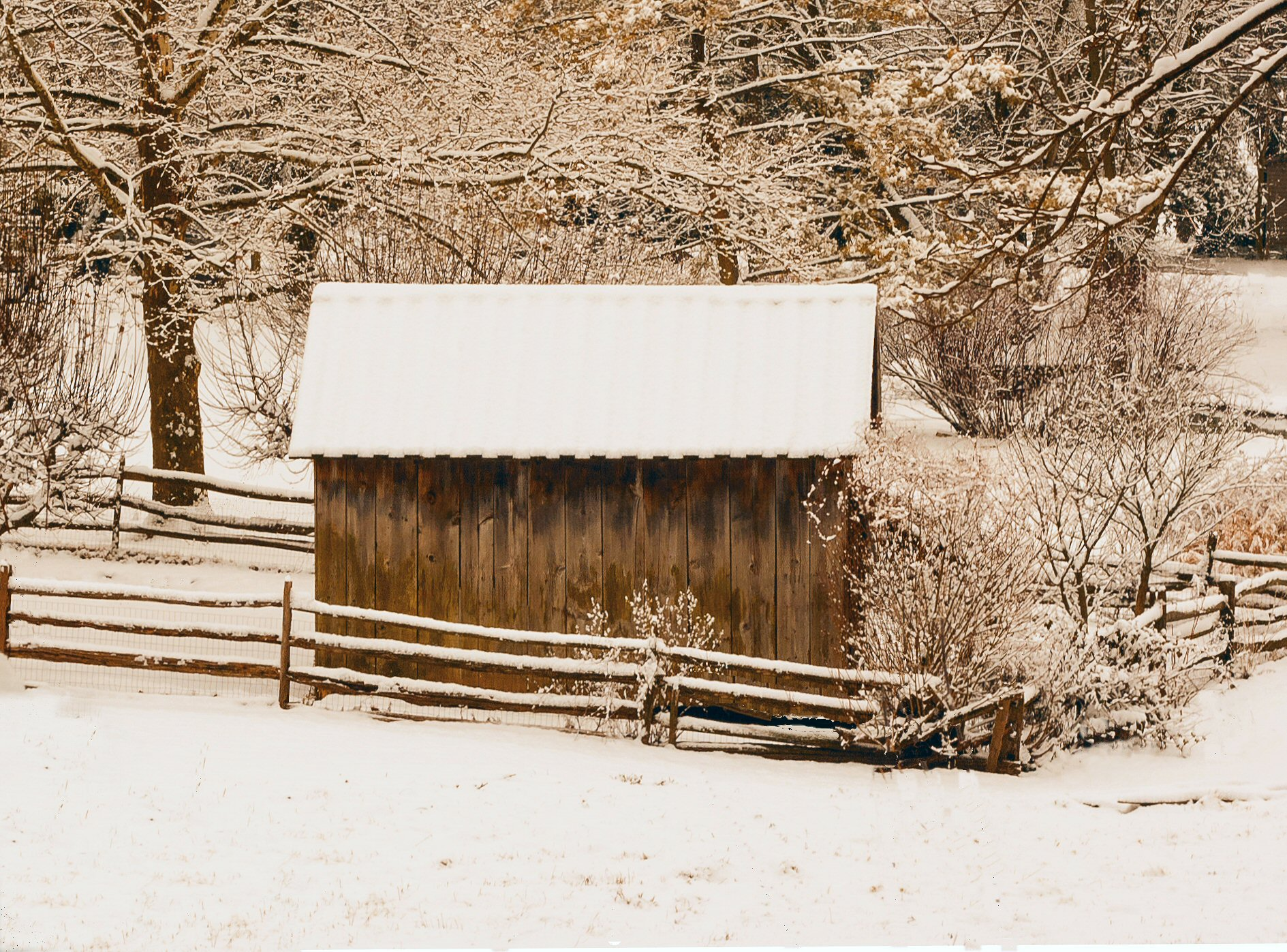
The pigsty

== The 1778 stone farmhouse ==
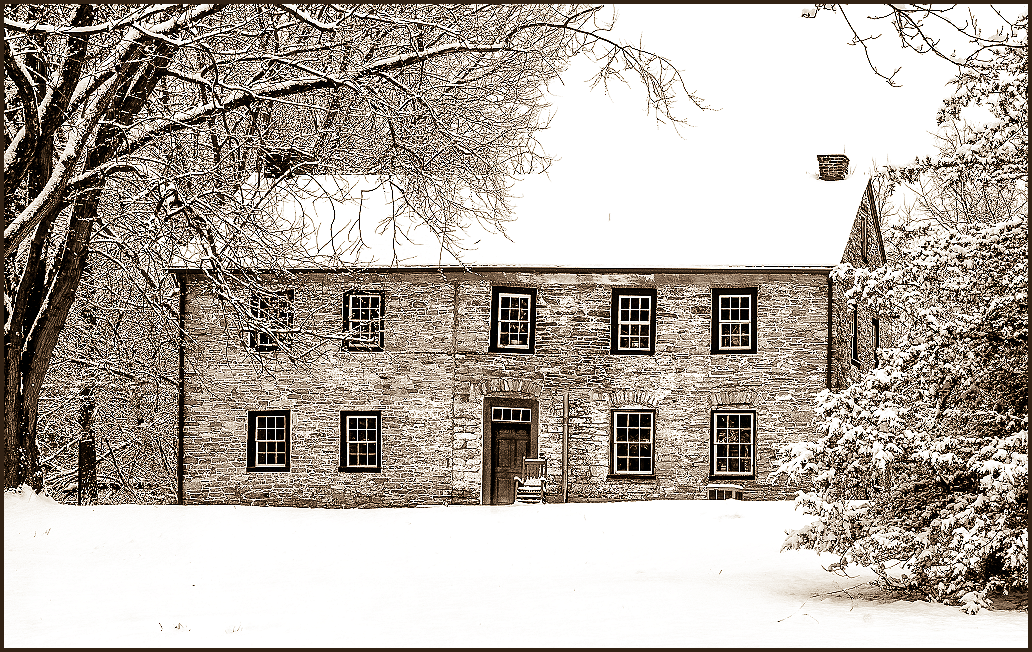
The stone farmhouse, with a 1778 datestone for Christian and Anna Hess

The stone farmhouse is next door to the log farmhouse. The construction date 1778 is carved in the gable datestone, with the initials C. H. These initials are for Christian Hess (1757-1816), the great-grandson of immigrant Hans Hess.

Christian Hess and wife Anna farmed approximately 100 acres here. Christian also operated the Hess mill built by his father Johannes.

A vaulted arch cellar is beneath the kitchen. The kitchen retains its original hearth and mantle. The house was enlarged to its present form ca 1800 by Christian's sister Elizabeth and her husband Mennonite Deacon Daniel Burkholder.

== The 1885 mill ==
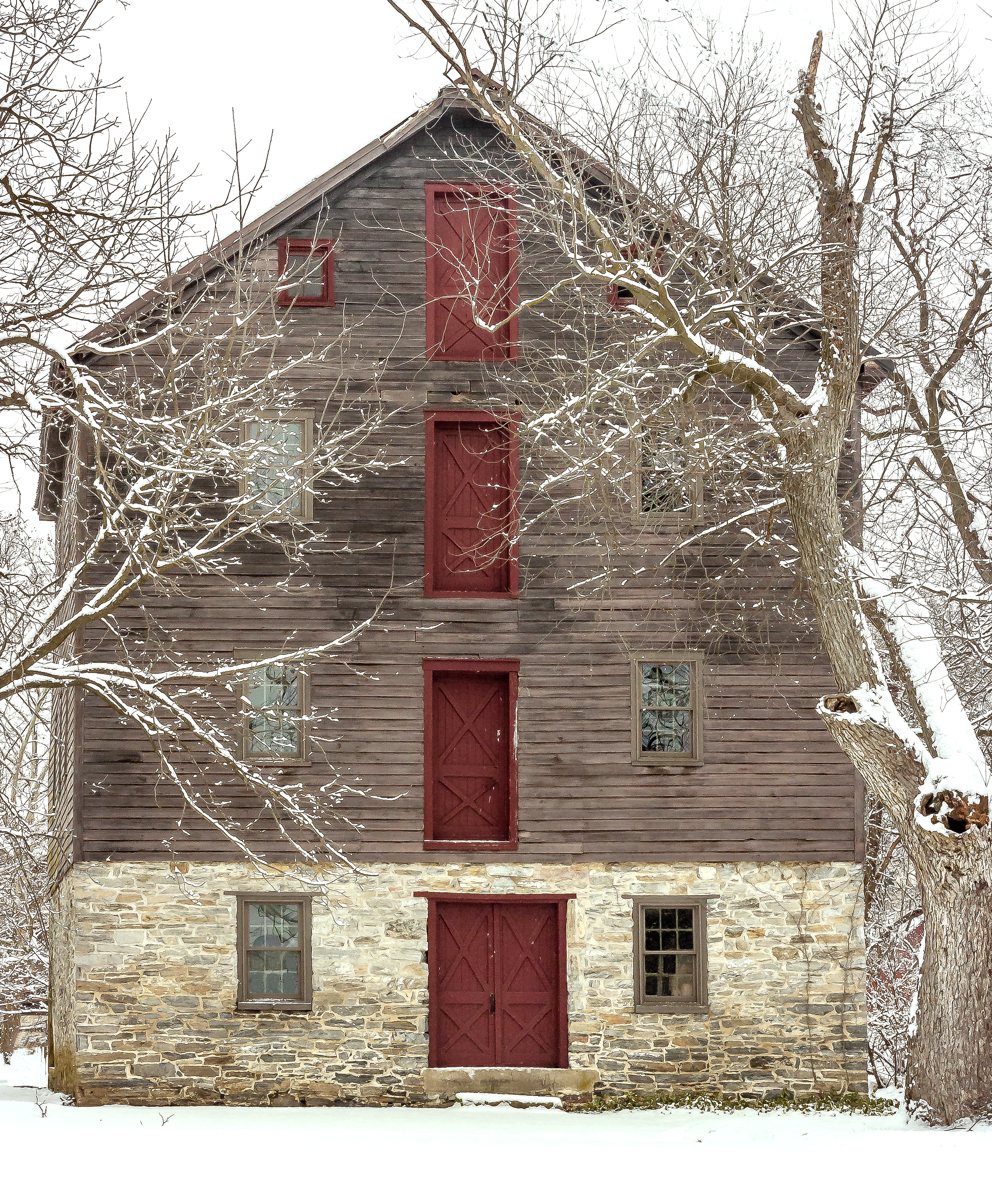
Mill facade

This oil and hemp mill, located on the Lititz Run creek, was built by Johannes Hess c. 1769, while he was living in the log farmhouse with wife Susanna. The mill produced flaxseed oil and hempseed oil until 1790, when it began operation as a gristmill to grind wheat for flour.

A sawmill was added during this time, in an adjoining shed. The grist mill burned in an 1884 fire, but the stone first floor survived. One year later a frame mill was constructed on the mill's original stones walls, as it now stands. Milling ceased ca. 1900, and the building was used as a pretzel bakery by the Sturgis family. During that same era the mill was also used for storing whiskey distilled at the Rome Distillery, located a short distance upstream. The mill was later used as a tobacco warehouse.

== Hess Homestead restoration ==
Beginning in 1985, the log farmhouse and stone farmhouse were purchased and restored by Clarke Hess, a descendant of the immigrants Hans and Magdalena Hess. Clarke Hess also relocated several historic outbuildings to the homestead. Those outbuildings had been threatened with demolition at their previous sites, including a stone spring house, a pig sty with hand-hewn timbers, and a ca. 1785 central-chimney log cabin.

In 1999 Warwick Township officials installed historical markers for the log farmhouse and for the stone farmhouse. The signs are located on a walking trail that adjoins the farmhouses. This trail is the site of the former Reading Railroad line of the Reading Company.

== Notes ==
- Bergengren, Charles (1988). "The Cycle of Transformation in the Houses of Schaefferstwon, Pennsylvania. " Ph.D. diss., University of Pennsylvania.
- van Dolsen, Nancy; et al. (2004). Architecture and Landscape of the Pennsylvania Germans 1720-1920. Guidebook for the Vernacular Architecture Forum Annual Conference. Hess, Clarke. "Religious Communities". pp. 113–133. Vernacular Architecture Forum.
- Gilbert, Geri (2005). The Warrant Maps of Lancaster County, Pennsylvania, Masthof Press, Morgantown, PA.
- Jurgelski, Susan (1993). "Uncovering History / 18th-century Hess Homestead to be on Historic Preservation Trust Tour". Lancaster New Era, Lancaster, PA.
- Hess, Clarke (2008). A Brief History of the Rome Mill. Monograph, Lititz.
- Hess, John H. (1880). A Family Record of the Hess Family. Sunbeam Print, Lititz.
- Keen, R. Martin (January 1990). "Community and Material Culture Among Lancaster Mennonites: Hans Hess from 1717 to 1733". Pennsylvania Mennonite Heritage.
- McMury, Sally; van Dolsen, Nancy (2011). Architecture and Landscape of the Pennsylvania Germans 1720-1920. University of Pennsylvania Press, Philadelphia, Oxford.
- Phelps, Hermann, (1967). Alemannische Holzbaukunst. Franz Steiner, Weisbaden.
- Schneider, Davib B.,(1994). Foundations in a Fertile Soil / Farming and Farm Buildings in Lancaster County, Pennsylvania. The Historic Preservation Trust of Lancaster County.
- Siegrist, Joanne Hess (1998). Hess Story. Siegrist, Joanne Hess, Bird in Hand, PA.
- Siegrist, Joanne Hess; Hess, Suzanne Ruhl (2004). Hess Family Tours. Hess Historians, Lancaster, PA.
- Ziegler und Ulrich, (pub) (Feb. 9, 1804). Zuercherisches Wochen-Blatt. Vol 21. No.12., Zurich.
