= Warwick School District =

School district in the U.S. state of Pennsylvania

Location
- Lititz; Lancaster County; Pennsylvania northern Lancaster County United States

District information
- Motto: Knowledge, Skills, Values
- Grades: K-12
- Superintendent: Jason Reifsnyder

Students and staff
- Athletic conference: PIAA, Lancaster-Lebanon League
- District mascot: Warriors
- Colors: Red and black

Other information
- Website: www.warwicksd.org

Warwick School District is located in Lititz, Pennsylvania, United States. The school district serves Elizabeth Township, Warwick Township, and Lititz Borough. It contains six schools, which include Warwick High School, Warwick Middle School, John Beck Elementary School, John Bonfield Elementary School, Kissel Hill Elementary School and Lititz Elementary School.

Warwick School District's colors are red and black, and its mascot is the Warrior. It is a member of the Pennsylvania Interscholastic Athletic Association, more specifically the Lancaster-Lebanon League, competing in Class AAA in most sports.

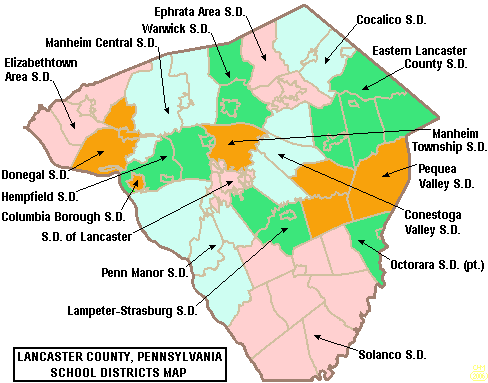
Map of Lancaster County, Pennsylvania public school districts. Warwick School District is in green in the north central part of the county.
