= Conestoga Traction Company =

American regional interurban trolley

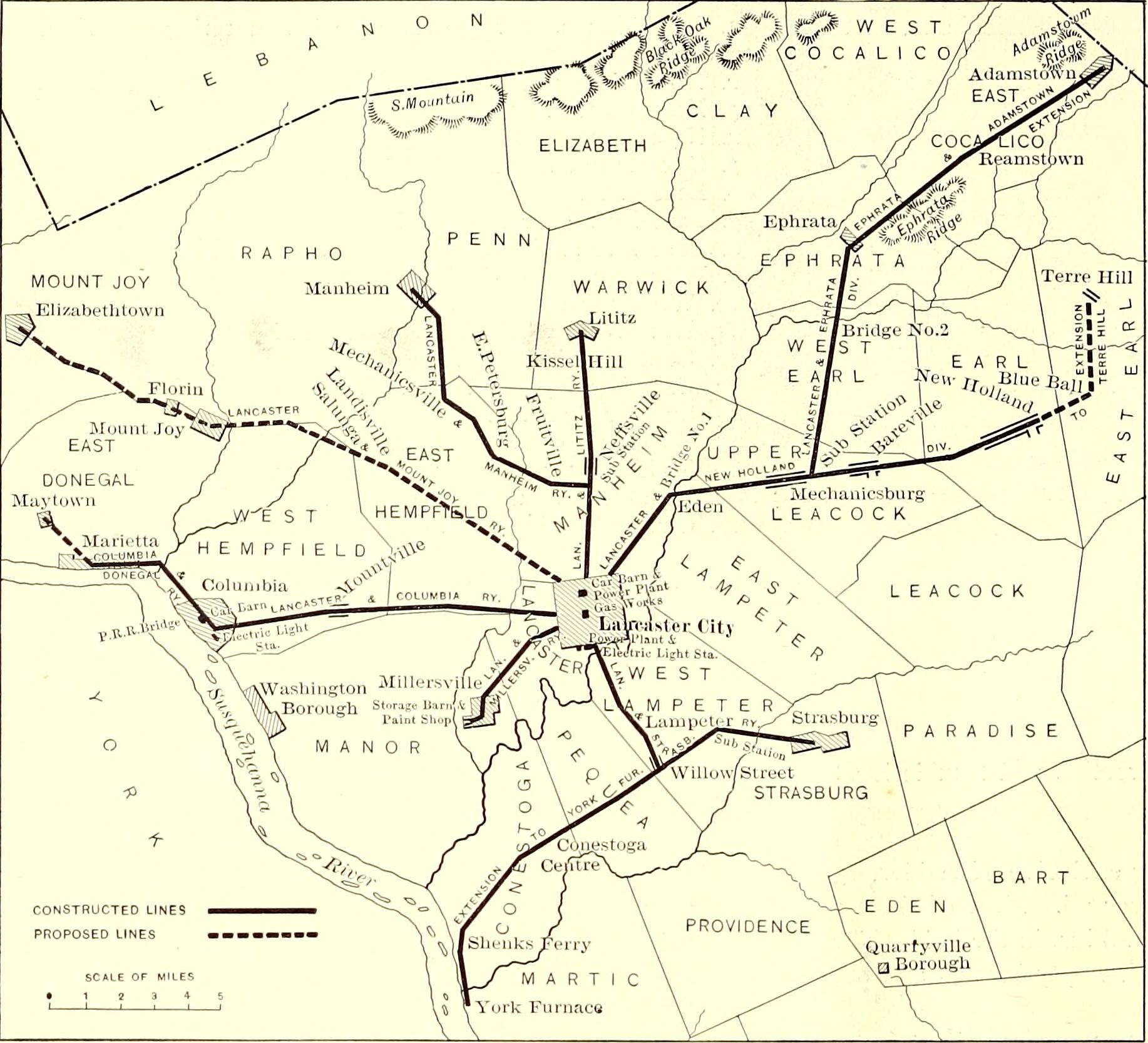
Conestoga Traction Network

Conestoga Traction, later Conestoga Transportation Company, was a classic American regional interurban trolley that operated seven routes from 1899 to 1946 radiating spoke-like from Lancaster, Pennsylvania, to numerous neighboring farm villages and towns. It ran side-of-road trolleys through Amish farm country to Coatesville, Strasburg/Quarryville, Pequea, Columbia/Marietta, Elizabethtown, Manheim/Lititz, and Ephrata/Adamstown/Terre Hill.

== History ==
Conestoga Traction, later Conestoga Transportation Company, was a classic country interurban that operated seven routes radiating spoke-like from Lancaster, Pennsylvania, to numerous neighboring towns and farm villages. It ran side-of-road trolleys through Amish farm country east to Coatesville and Strasburg/Quarryville, south to Pequea, west to Columbia/Marietta and Elizabethtown, north to Manheim/Lititz, and northeast to Ephrata/Adamstown/Terre Hill. CT also transported farm freight, such as milk and produce, in its little cars.

Conestoga Traction began operations in 1899. CTs rural trolley system provided reliable and relatively fast transportation between many southeastern Pennsylvania farm towns in the days when people traveled in horse drawn buggies and freight traveled in horse-drawn wagons on narrow wandering dusty roads in summer or rutted deep mud roads in winter. In 1924, when business and profits were still good, Conestoga Traction updated its aging wood trolleys with a purchase of all steel small interurban trolley cars from Cincinnati Car Company. Farm freight and dairy pickups would occur with stops at farm gates using trolleys called "combines" designed to carry passengers in one section and freight in another. With its connections with neighboring Hershey Transit, CT shipped fresh uncooled Amish farm milk to the Hershey Company for immediate use in chocolate production. Hershey Transit permitted trolleys from the neighboring connecting lines, including Conestoga Traction, onto its rails to carry summer crowds to the Hershey Park for the amusement rides and to picnic. Picnic specials ran into the 1930s.

== A ride to Philadelphia by trolley ==
Conestoga Traction's connections to adjacent interurban trolley companies such as Philadelphia and West Chester (later Red Arrow; now today's operating Media–Sharon Hill Line), West Chester Street Railway, West Chester and Coatesville Traction, Schuylkill Valley Traction, Reading Transit, Hershey Transit, and Harrisburg Railways, one could ride trolleys from Philadelphia to Harrisburg, although the trip would have been long and slow and impractical. This could be accomplished by two circuitous routes. The southern route was via West Chester-Coatesville-Lancaster-Hershey and the northern route was via Norristown-Pottstown-Reading-Ephrata-Lebanon-Hershey. From Hershey to Harrisburg was by connections.

== Decline and abandonment ==
Most interurbans like Conestoga Traction did not survive improved highways with the related increased purchase and use of automobiles, or the negative business impact of the Great Depression. Conestoga Traction abandoned most of its lines in 1932. The Lancaster-Ephrata line was still running in 1946 having been ordered by the Federal Government to do so because of World War II transportation needs. Lancaster's Birney Car street car operation continued until 1947. Neighbor Hershey Transit survived until 1946.

== Toonerville Trolley Comics ==
A popular and long running national newspaper cartoon strip was "Toonerville Folks." It began in 1908 and ran to 1955 with the inscription "The Toonerville Trolley That Met All The Trains." Central to the strip was a very short and bouncy trolley (often shown running above the track) operated by a grizzled old conductor and his cheerful motorman. The strip was modeled after Conestoga Traction and similar hill-and-dale rural interurban trolley lines in Pennsylvania such as [73] West Penn Railways, which operated a very extensive (130 mile) trolley system throughout western Pennsylvania centered around McKeesport-Greensburg-Connellsville and Uniontown until 1955.
