= White House Gift Shop =

Gift shop at The White House

- Founder: Harry S. Truman
- Headquarters: Lititz, Pennsylvania, U.S.

White House Gift Shop is a gift shop that was founded on September 9, 1946, during the Truman administration. Originally named the White House Flower Fund, the gift shop is now privately owned and has no connection with the White House and is unaffiliated with the U.S. federal government. The headquarters have been located at Lititz, Pennsylvania since 2012.
