= Lititz Watch Technicum =

Watchmaking school in Pennsylvania, U.S.

Coordinates: 40.1659°N 76.3089°W

- Industry: Fine mechanics
- Founded: 2001
- Defunct: July 2025
- Headquarters: Lititz, Pennsylvania, United States
- Products: Chronographs; Mikromechanics
- Website: lititzwatchtechnicum.org

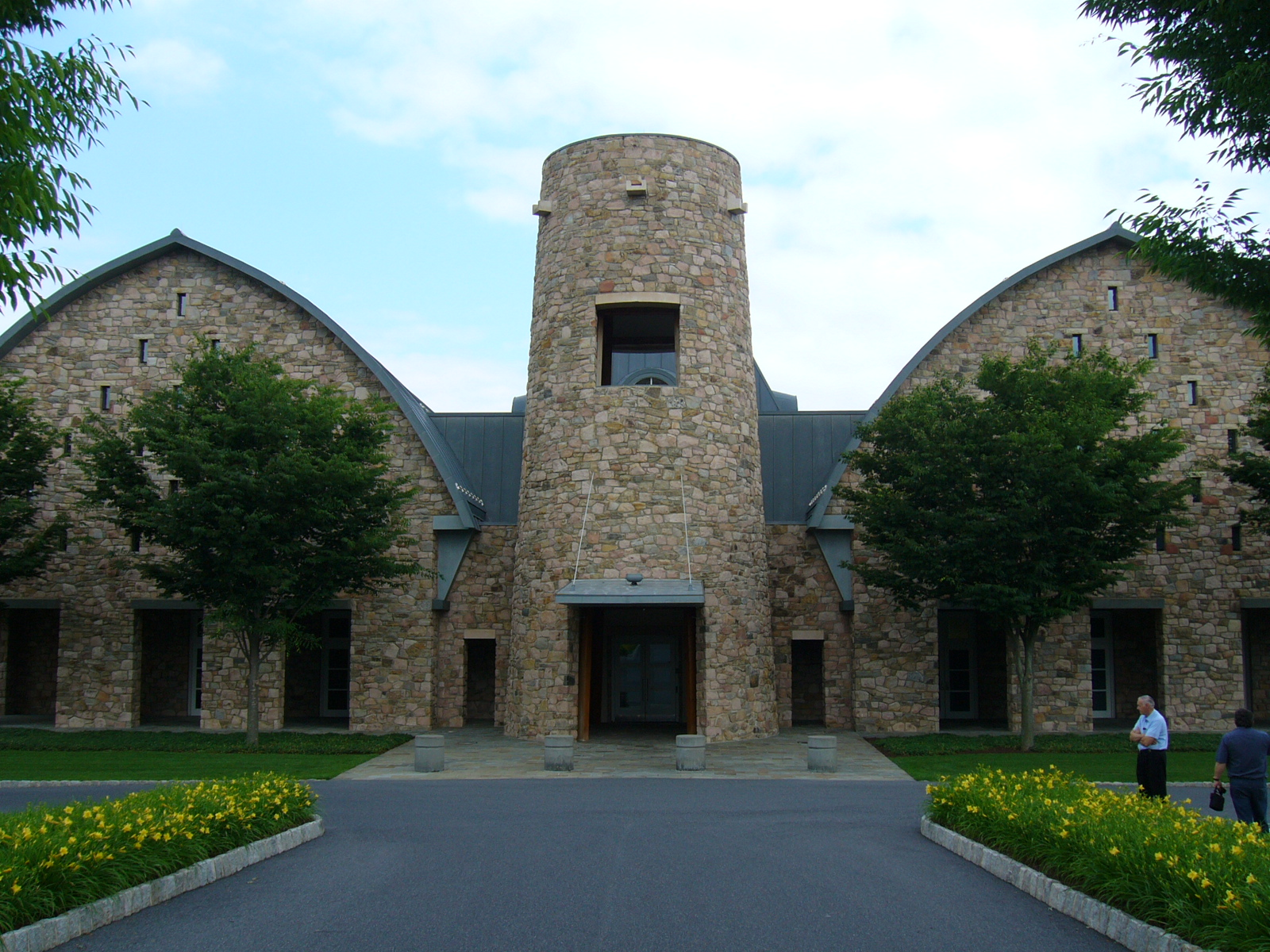
Entrance to the school

The Lititz Watch Technicum was a watchmaking school located in Lititz, Pennsylvania, and was designed by an architect Michael Graves. Founded by Rolex in 2001, the school was created to help make up for the deficiency of skilled watchmakers in the United States. In the mid-1970's, there were 44 watchmaking academies in America, but by 2001 the number had dwindled to just ten, and in 2019 only six remained. The 54,000 square foot facility on Wynfield Drive also housed the Rolex service center.

Offering free tuition to its inaugural September 2001 class, Rolex received hundreds of applications, but accepted only twelve students. Ranging age from 17 to 37, they were taught in three classrooms over an 11-month academic year, eight hours a day, five days a week. Charles Berthiaume, director of the school, told the Associated Press "[w]ith the shortage of watchmakers, we're literally missing a generation."

The Technicum offered a two-year, 3000+ hour SAWTA (Swiss American Watchmaker's Training Alliance) curriculum. Tuition was free but students paid for the cost of their toolkits, which was around $7,000, along with housing and meals. The program focused on micromechanics and watch service for high-end, luxury watches with a strong emphasis on chronographs.

In 2010, the school, established as a nonprofit foundation, became an educational subsidiary of the Rolex corporation. At the time, principal Herman Mayer was one of its three instructors and 21 students were enrolled.

By 2017, the Lititz Watch Technicum put 148 students through its 3,500 hour training program with an 85% graduation rate.

The school closed in July 2025 and its training programs were moved to Dallas, Texas. The existing service center expanded into the space previously occupied by the school.
