= Todd Rucci =

American football player (born 1970)

No. 71
- Position: Guard

Personal information
- Born: July 14, 1970 (age 56); Upper Darby Township, Pennsylvania, U.S.
- Listed height: 6 ft 5 in (1.96 m)
- Listed weight: 296 lb (134 kg)

Career information
- High school: Upper Darby
- College: Penn State
- NFL draft: 1993: 2nd round, 51st overall pick

Career history
- New England Patriots (1993–2000)

Awards and highlights
- New England Patriots All-1990s Team

Career NFL statistics
- Games played: 85
- Games started: 75
- Stats at Pro Football Reference

Todd Louis Rucci (born July 14, 1970) is an American former professional football player who was a guard for eight seasons with the New England Patriots of the National Football League (NFL) from 1993 to 2000. He played college football for the Penn State Nittany Lions. Rucci was a starter in Super Bowl XXXI for the New England Patriots.

Rucci graduated in 1988 from Upper Darby High School where he also excelled at the shot put and discus on the track team. He was in the same high school class as Bill Jensen and Tina Fey.

Pre-draft measurables
Height	Weight	Arm length	Hand span	40-yard dash	10-yard split	20-yard split	20-yard shuttle	Vertical jump	Broad jump	Bench press
6 ft 5 1/8 in (1.96 m)	285 lb (129 kg)	32 5/8 in (0.83 m)	9 1/2 in (0.24 m)	5.29 s	1.84 s	3.09 s	4.60 s	23.5 in (0.60 m)	8 ft 8 in (2.64 m)	23 reps

Selected in the second round of the 1993 NFL draft (51st overall), Rucci was honored by being named to the New England Patriots' 1990s All-Decade Team.

He has two sons who have followed in his footsteps. His oldest son, Hayden Rucci, played tight end for the University of Wisconsin–Madison, as well as for the Miami Dolphins. His youngest son, Nolan Rucci, was a 5-star offensive line prospect for the 2021 class before also committing to Wisconsin.
