= John Beck (reformer) =

New Zealand public servant and child welfare reformer

John Beck (22 January 1883–13 January 1962) was a New Zealand public servant and child welfare reformer. He was born in Kirkcudbright, Kirkcudbrightshire, Scotland on 22 January 1883.
