= John Beck's Boys Academy =

Lititz Academy for Boys was a nineteenth-century boarding school in the Moravian village of Lititz, Lancaster County, Pennsylvania. It drew students from throughout the eastern U.S. and even from Canada, the Caribbean and Europe. In total, 2,326 pupils passed through Beck's curriculum, including Major General John F. Reynolds, a Union army leader killed at Gettysburg and his older brother Admiral William Reynolds; a number of successful businessmen, educators and Congressmen; railroad president Franklin B. Gowen; and the nephew of the abolitionist and Reconstruction politician, Thaddeus Stevens.

== History ==
The school's founder, John Beck, was born in Frederick County, Maryland on June 16, 1791. While a child, his family moved to Lancaster County and then to Lebanon County. With no local school available, his parents sent John to Nazareth Hall, in Nazareth, Pennsylvania, a precursor of Moravian College. His accomplishments there were sufficiently undistinguished that they determined, when he was fifteen, to apprentice him to learn a trade under the care of a "religious and strictly moral man. . . whose views in that regard accorded with their own." Looking about they located a shoemaker in Lititz "whom they believed worthy of their confidence."

Beck's teaching career started in 1813, a short time after completing his apprenticeship, when he was engaged to tutor five local apprentice boys. From this beginning, Beck next became master of the village school in Lititz, with twenty-two boys. In 1818, when Beck was offered a $300 salary to run the parochial school in Bethlehem, Pennsylvania, the people of Lititz dissuaded him by offering to turn their school over to him on his own terms. The school grew in the next several years from a single classroom in a converted blacksmith shop to a newly built, multi-room building; and simultaneously from simply the village school into a boarding school, John Beck's Boys Academy.

The boys lived with the families of the village, which was owned and governed by the local Moravian congregation. Studies went well beyond the usual "3 R's" to include more advanced subjects such as astronomy, chemistry, algebra, trigonometry and German. The school term was long, with only four weeks' vacation a year. Classes were held in morning and afternoon sessions; during the winter there were also evening lectures on "the various branches of Natural philosophy" and "the Manners and Customs and forms of Government of Nations."
