= Lititz, Pennsylvania =

Borough in Pennsylvania, US

Lititz
- Borough
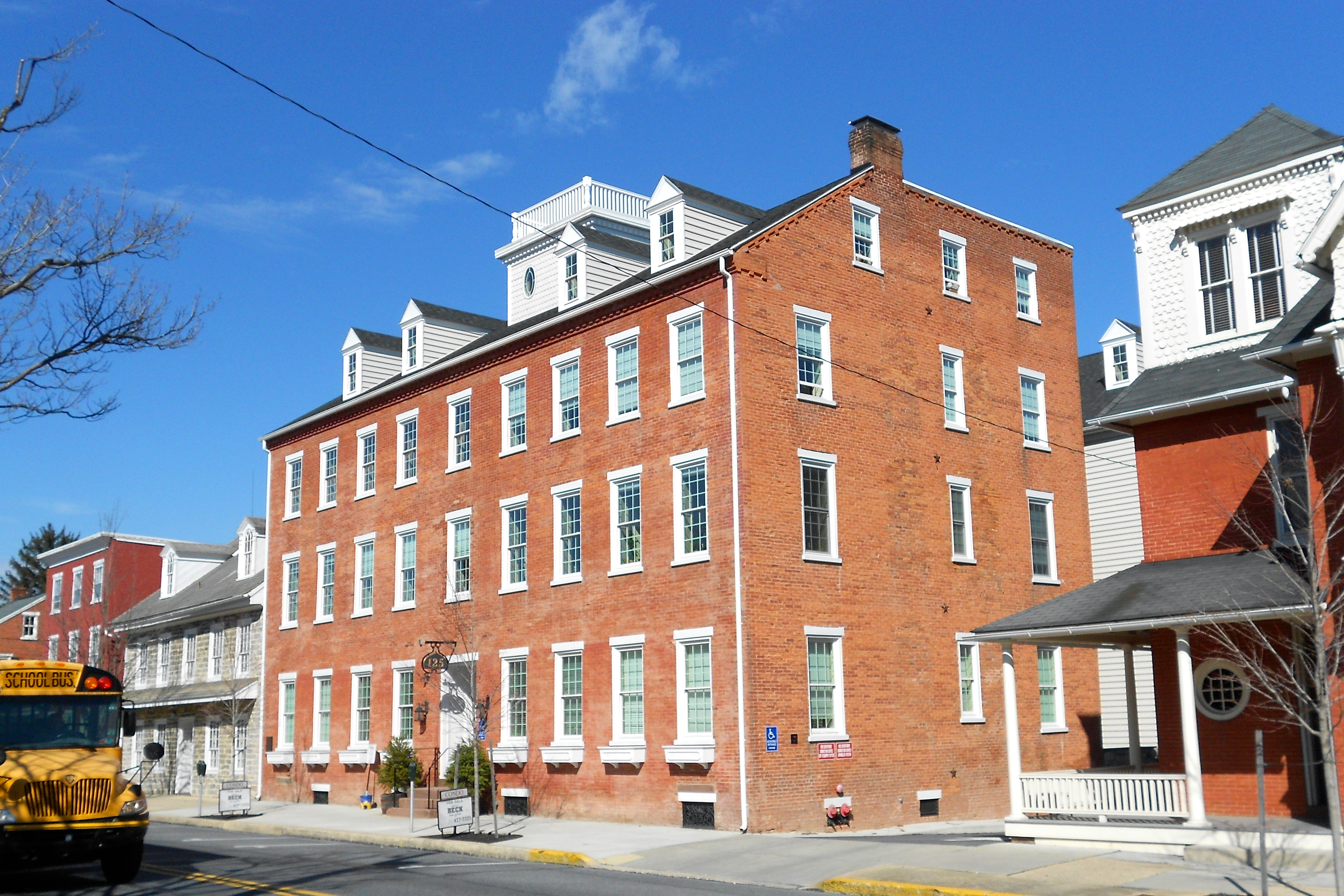
- 125 E. Main Street

- Flag
- Etymology: Litice Castle
- Motto: "The Heart of Lancaster County"
- Location in Lancaster County, Pennsylvania

- Location in Pennsylvania Location in the United States
- Coordinates: 40°09′17″N 76°18′12″W
- Country: United States
- State: Pennsylvania
- County: Lancaster
- Settled: 1710
- Founded: 1756

Government
  - Mayor: John George (D)

Area
  - Total: 2.32 sq mi (6.02 km^{2})
  - Land: 2.32 sq mi (6.01 km^{2})
  - Water: 0.0039 sq mi (0.01 km^{2})
- Elevation: 381 ft (116 m)

Population (2020)
  - Total: 9,381
  - Density: 4,039.7/sq mi (1,559.73/km^{2})
- Time zone: UTC-5 (EST)
  - Summer (DST): UTC-4 (EDT)
- ZIP Code: 17543
- Area codes: 717
- FIPS code: 42-43816
- Website: www.lititzpa.com

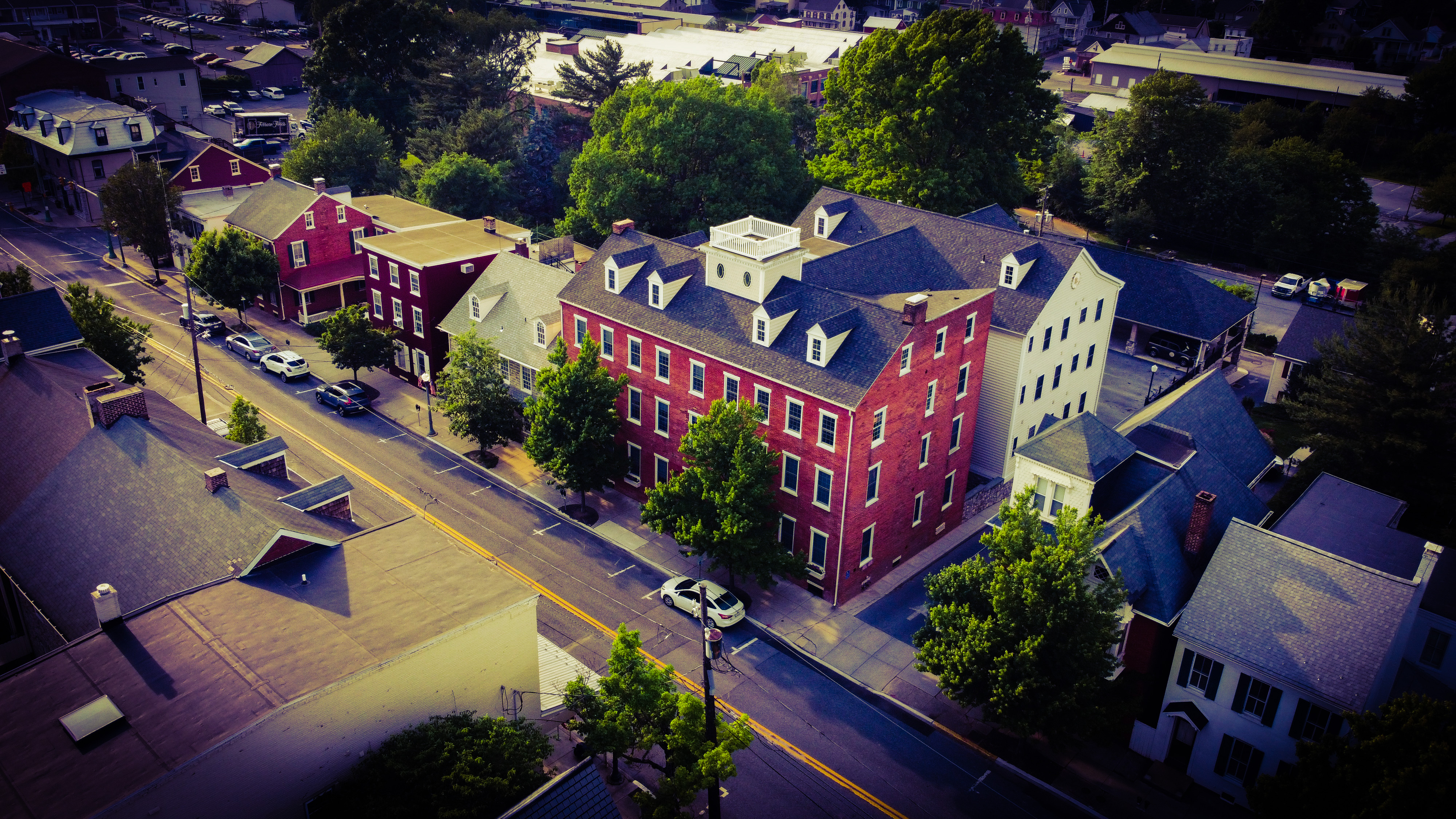
An aerial view of 125 East Main Street, the first house in Lititz

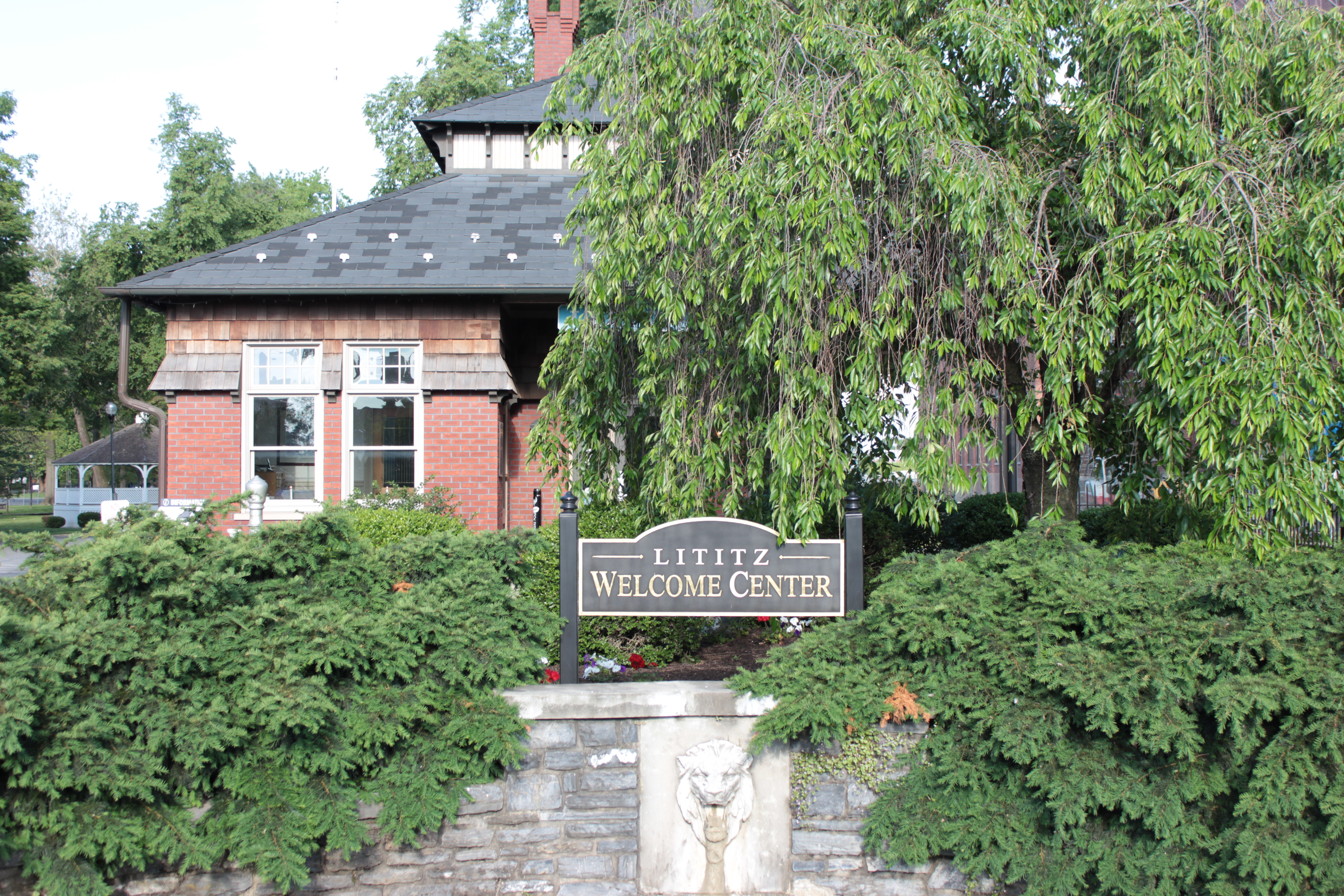
The Welcome Center at Lititz Train Station

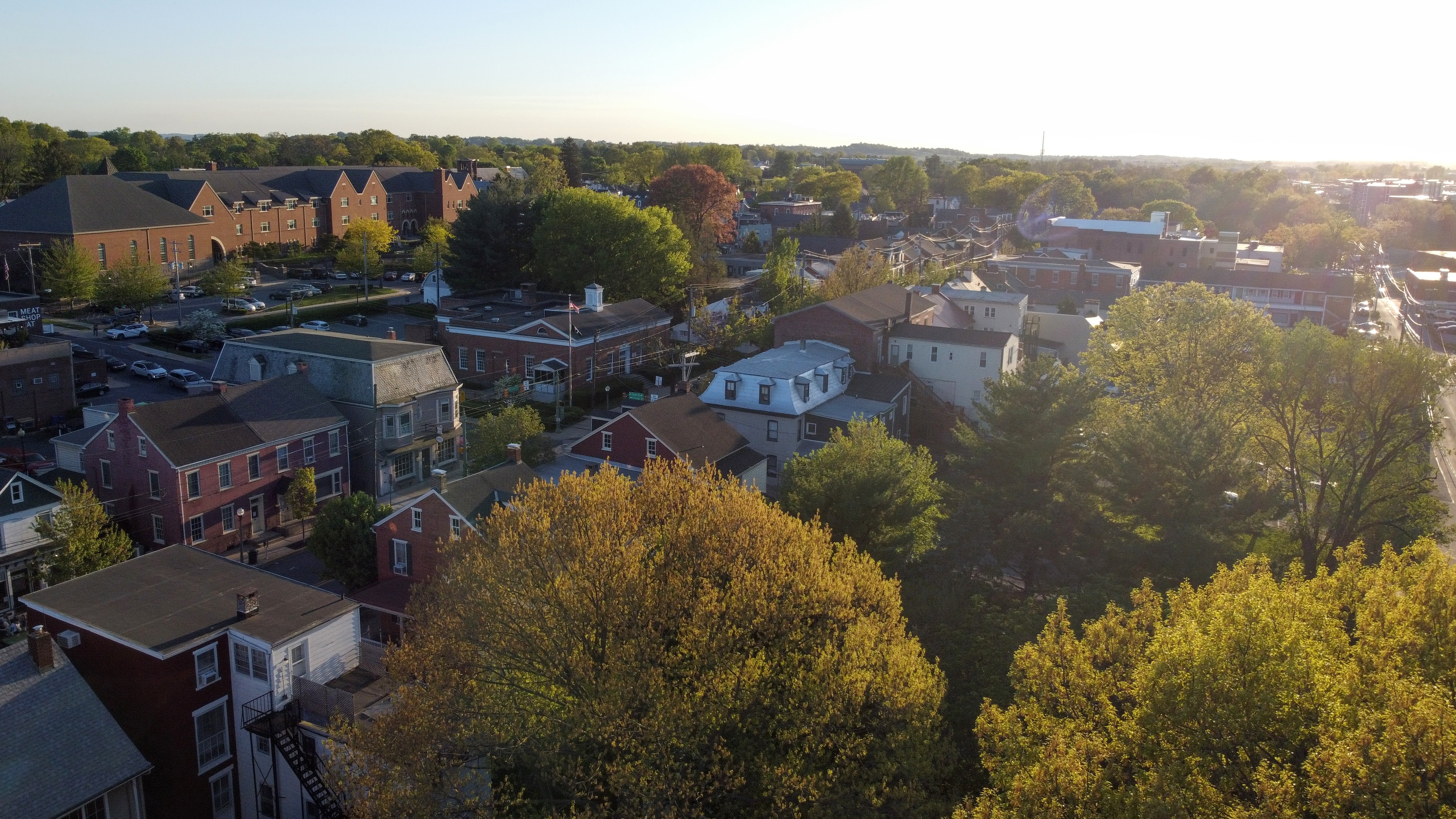
Aerial View of Lititz, PA

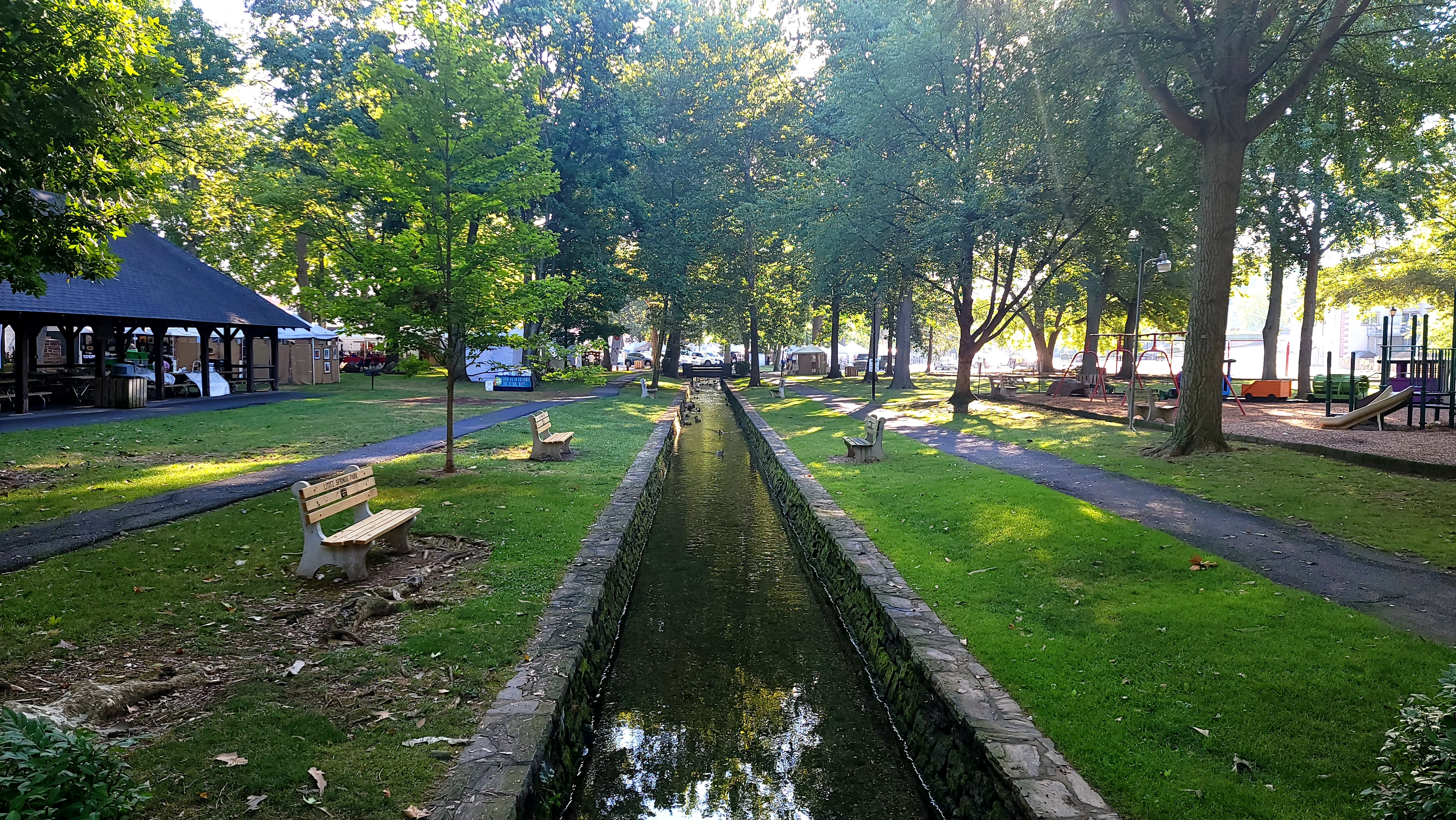
Lititz Spring Park

Lititz (/ˈlɪtɪts/) is a borough in Lancaster County, Pennsylvania, United States, 9 miles (14 km) north of Lancaster. As of the 2020 census, it had a population of 9,370.

== History ==
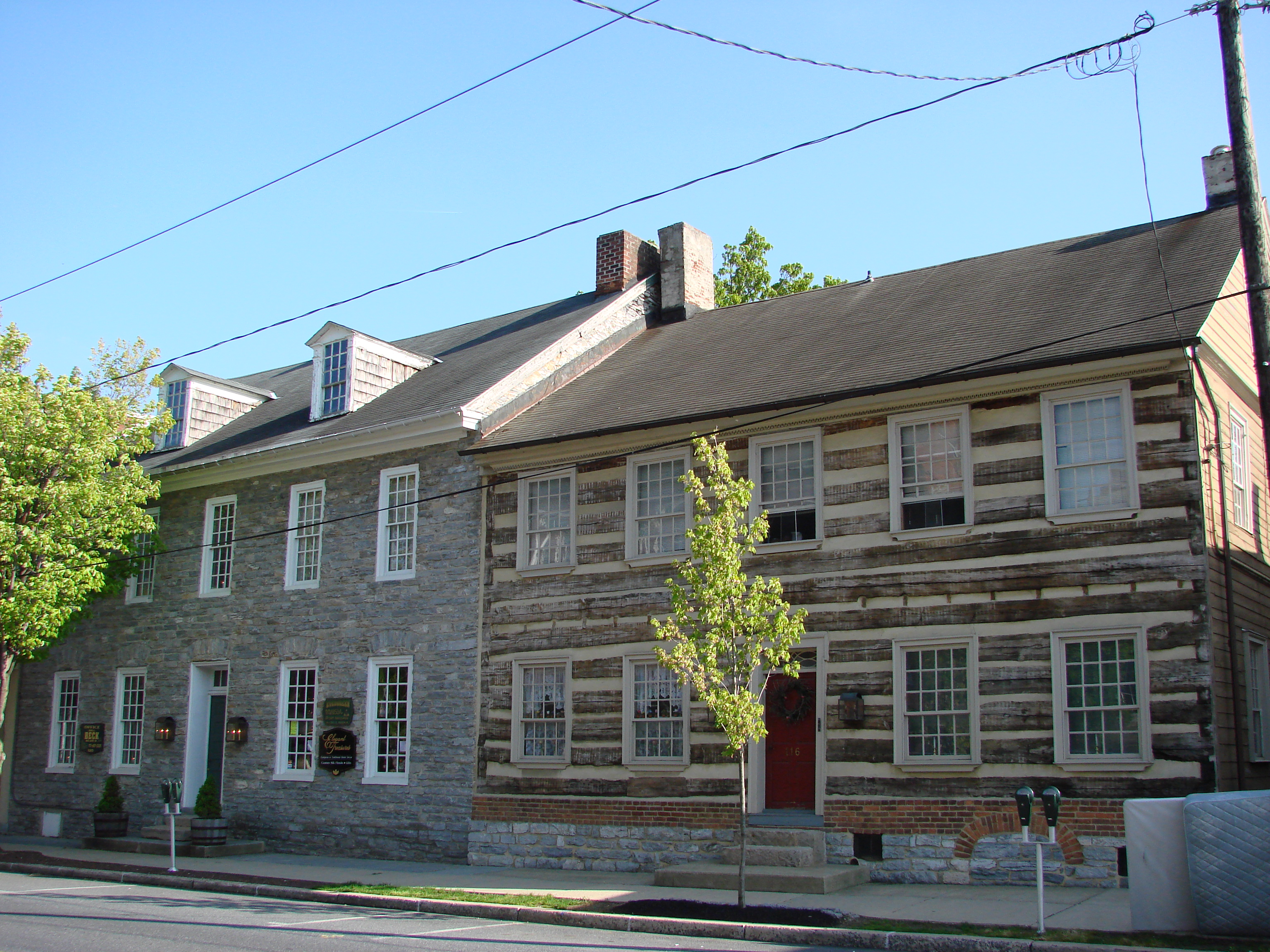
Houses on Main Street in Lititz

Lititz was founded by members of the Moravian Church in 1756 and was named by a German form of name of the Litice Castle in Bohemia. Lititz was one of four leading Moravian communities in Pennsylvania, the other three being Bethlehem, Emmaus, and Nazareth.

For a century, only Moravians were permitted to live in Lititz. Until the middle of the nineteenth century, only members of the congregation could own houses; others were required to lease. The lease system was abolished in 1855, just five years before the beginning of the American Civil War.

During the American Revolutionary War, Brethren's House, built in 1759, was used as a hospital for Continental Army troops, and a number of Continental Army soldiers died and were buried here.

Lititz is also home to Linden Hall School for Girls, the oldest all-girls boarding school in the United States. Located adjacent to the Moravian Church on 47 acres (19 ha) of land, Linden Hall was founded by the Moravians in 1746, a decade before the borough was incorporated.

== Geography ==
According to the U.S. Census Bureau, the borough has a total area of 2.3 square miles (6.0 km^{2}), of which 2.00 acres (8,090 m^{2}), or 0.13%, are water. Lititz Run flows through the downtown from Lititz Springs Park toward the Conestoga River, 6 miles (10 km) to the southeast.

Lititz has a hot-summer humid continental climate (Dfa) and average monthly temperatures range from 30.1 °F in January to 74.7 °F in July. The local hardiness zone is 6b.

== Demographics ==
Historical population
Census	Pop.	Note	%±
1880	1,113		—
1890	1,494		34.2%
1900	1,637		9.6%
1910	2,082		27.2%
1920	3,680		76.8%
1930	4,363		18.6%
1940	4,840		10.9%
1950	5,568		15.0%
1960	5,987		7.5%
1970	7,072		18.1%
1980	7,590		7.3%
1990	8,280		9.1%
2000	9,029		9.0%
2010	9,369		3.8%
2020	9,381		0.1%
2021 (est.)	9,527	▲	1.6%

As of the census of 2000, there were 9,029 people, 3,732 households, and 2,407 families residing in the borough. The population density was 3,884.0/sq mi (1,499.6/km^{2}). There were 3,827 housing units at an average density of 1,646.2 units per square mile (635.6 units/km^{2}). The racial makeup of the borough was 97.23% White, 0.44% African American, 0.09% Native American, 0.87% Asian, 0.03% Pacific Islander, 0.50% from other races, and 0.83% from two or more races. Hispanic or Latino of any race were 1.52% of the population.

There were 3,732 households, out of which 29.1% had children under the age of 18 living with them, 52.9% were married couples living together, 8.5% had a female householder with no husband present, and 35.5% were non-families. 31.0% of all households were made up of individuals, and 15.8% had someone living alone who was 65 years of age or older. The average household size was 2.32 and the average family size was 2.91.

In Lititz, the population was spread out, with 23.0% under the age of 18, 6.1% from 18 to 24, 28.8% from 25 to 44, 20.9% from 45 to 64, and 21.2% who were 65 years of age or older. The median age was 40 years. For every 100 females, there were 86.4 males. For every 100 females age 18 and over, there were 82.2 males.

The median income for a household in the borough was $40,417, and the median income for a family was $52,028. Males had a median income of $36,126 versus $25,997 for females. The per capita income for the borough was $20,601. About 2.6% of families and 4.1% of the population were below the poverty line, including 3.9% of those under age 18 and 8.7% of those age 65 or over.

== Economy ==
Lititz-based Woodstream manufactures mousetraps under the Victor brand name. Mousetraps have been produced in Lititz since 1899.

Sensenich Propeller, founded in 1932, is one of aviation's oldest continuously manufacturing propeller companies, specializing in propellers for light aircraft, unmanned aerial vehicles, and airboats. The company is particularly known for its wood props, but also has produced fixed-pitch metal props since 1948, and in recent years expanded to adjustable-pitch carbon-fiber composite propellers. Throughout the mid-20th century, Sensenich wood props were available on nearly all 1-seat and 2-seat U.S.-made aircraft, many of which still operate today. Wood prop manufacturing is now handled in their Florida-based facility.

Rock Lititz, a company specializing in live touring music stage, sound, and visual production, is headquartered and has a show production stage in Lititz. The facility attracts international artists like Beyoncé, BTS and Justin Bieber, to local stars Taylor Swift and Sabrina Carpenter, and supports music production suppliers in the area.

The White House Gift Shop is now based in Lititz. It is an online company selling (according to its website) a 'wide selection of White House, Presidential, Diplomatic, and United States Military gifts'. Originally set up by the Truman administration in 1946 it is now privately owned and no longer has any connection with the US Federal Government.

== Arts and culture ==
Annual events include:

- Independence Day event, founded in 1813, which includes a Queen of Candles Pageant and fireworks.
- Summer art show.
- Microbrewery festival.
- Fire and Ice Festival each February, featuring food trucks, entertainment, and ice carvings.

The Lititz Public Library is a member of the Library System of Lancaster County.

=== Museums and historic sites ===
- Gravesite of John A. Sutter
- Heritage Map Museum
- Johannes Mueller House
- Julius Sturgis Pretzel Bakery
- Lititz Springs Park
- Wilbur Chocolate Factory and Candy Americana Museum
- John Beck's Boys Academy
- Johann Agust Sutter House
- William Werner House
- Lititz Moravian Historic District

== Government ==
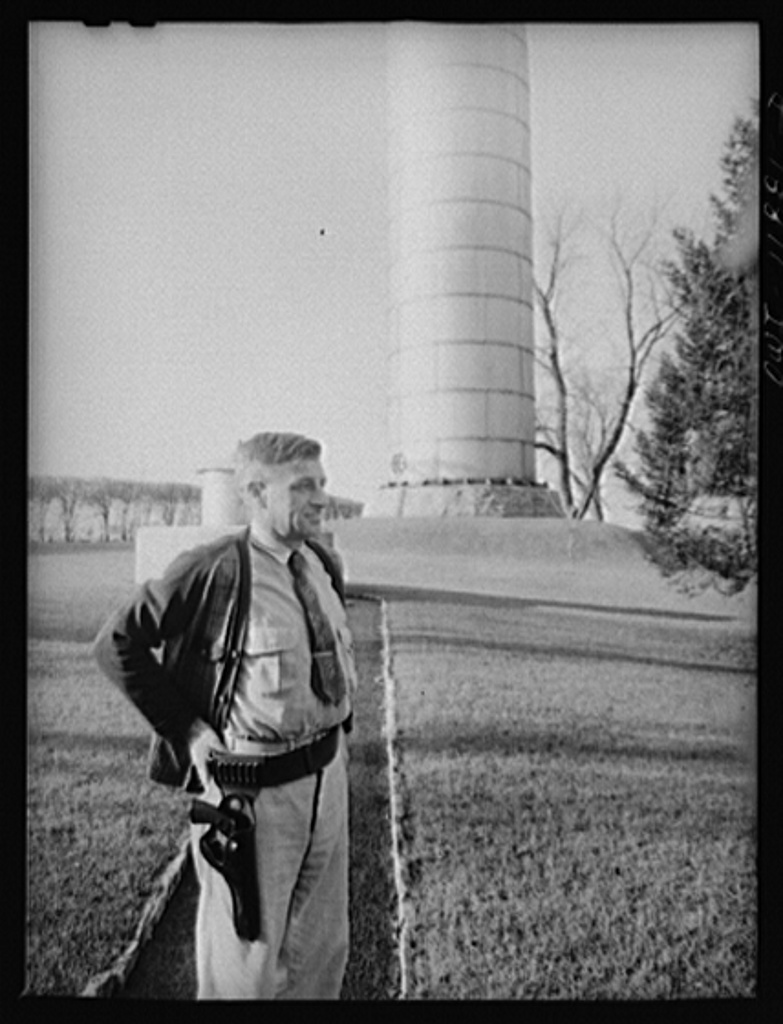
Ralph Miller guarded the Lititz water works for sixteen years. Photo by Marjory Collins in 1942.

- Mayor: John George (D)
- Borough Manager: Sue Ann Barry

== Education ==
Lititz, along with Elizabeth and Warwick townships and part of Penn Township, is located in the Warwick School District. Schools located in Lititz include:

- Warwick High School
- Warwick Middle School
- Lititz Elementary School (at former site of K-12 Lititz High School; serves the central and northern part of Lititz borough and western Warwick township out to Penn township and its border with Manheim Central School District)
- John Beck Elementary School (founded independently of the district and incorporated; serves the northern part of Warwick township and Elizabeth township)
- John R. Bonfield Elementary School (serves the eastern part of the school district, including the outskirts of Lititz borough and Warwick township)
- Kissel Hill Elementary School (serves the southern part of Lititz borough and Warwick township south to the Manheim Township line)
- Linden Hall School for Girls (the oldest all-girls private school in the country)

== Infrastructure ==
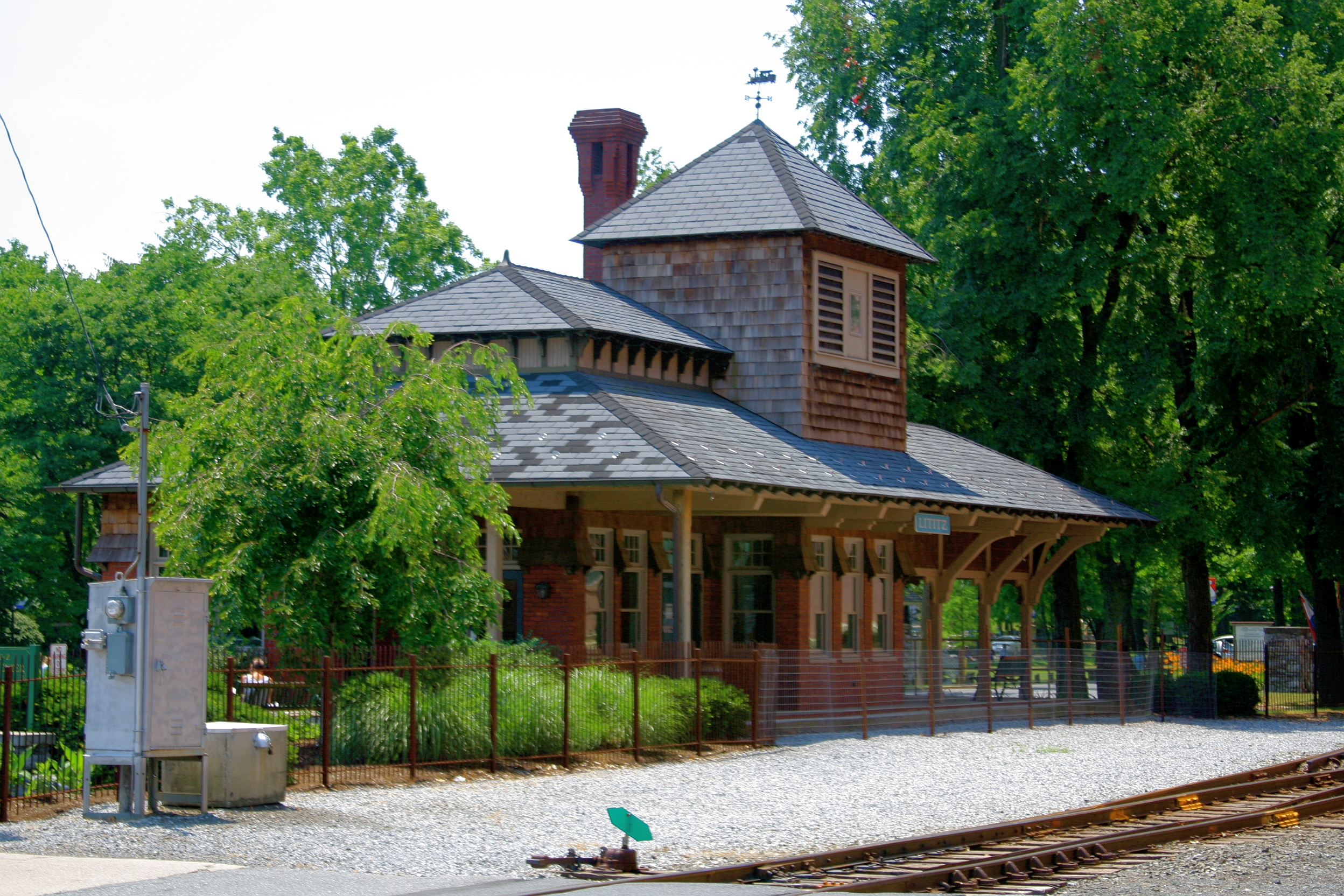
Train station

=== Transportation ===
Pennsylvania Routes 772 (West Orange and East Main streets) and 501 (Broad Street) run through Lititz.

The Reading and Columbia Railroad operated passenger service through downtown Lititz until 1952. Norfolk Southern continues to operate freight service to Lancaster, while the line between Lititz and Ephrata has been converted into a rail trail. A replica of the Lititz Depot was constructed at its former location in Lititz Springs Park in 1999, along with a small museum in a Reading caboose.

Bus service in Lititz is provided by Red Rose Transit Route 10, the successor of the Conestoga Traction Company trolley line to Lancaster along the Lititz Pike.

== Notable people ==
- Lon Keller, designer of New York Yankees logo
- Curtis Cregan, former member of Hi-5 USA
- John Fass (1890–1973), book designer, printer, photographer
- Matt Greiner, metalcore drummer for August Burns Red
- Mary Penry (1735–1804), Moravian sister
- Richard A. Snyder (1910–1992), Pennsylvania state senator
- Johann August Sutter (1803–1880), pioneer of California
- David Tannenberg, Moravian organ builder
- Louise Adeline Weitzel (1862–1934), poet
- Joey Welz (born 1940), musician; former pianist for Bill Haley & His Comets
- Andrew Wenger (born 1990), Hermann Trophy winner and professional soccer player for the Philadelphia Union
- Susanna Zeisberger (1744–1824), Moravian missionary

== Sister cities ==
Lititz has sister city relationship with:

- Kunvald, Czech Republic
- (United States) Freeport, Illinois

== See also ==
- Lititz Watch Technicum
- The Hess Homestead
