= Warwick High School (Pennsylvania) =

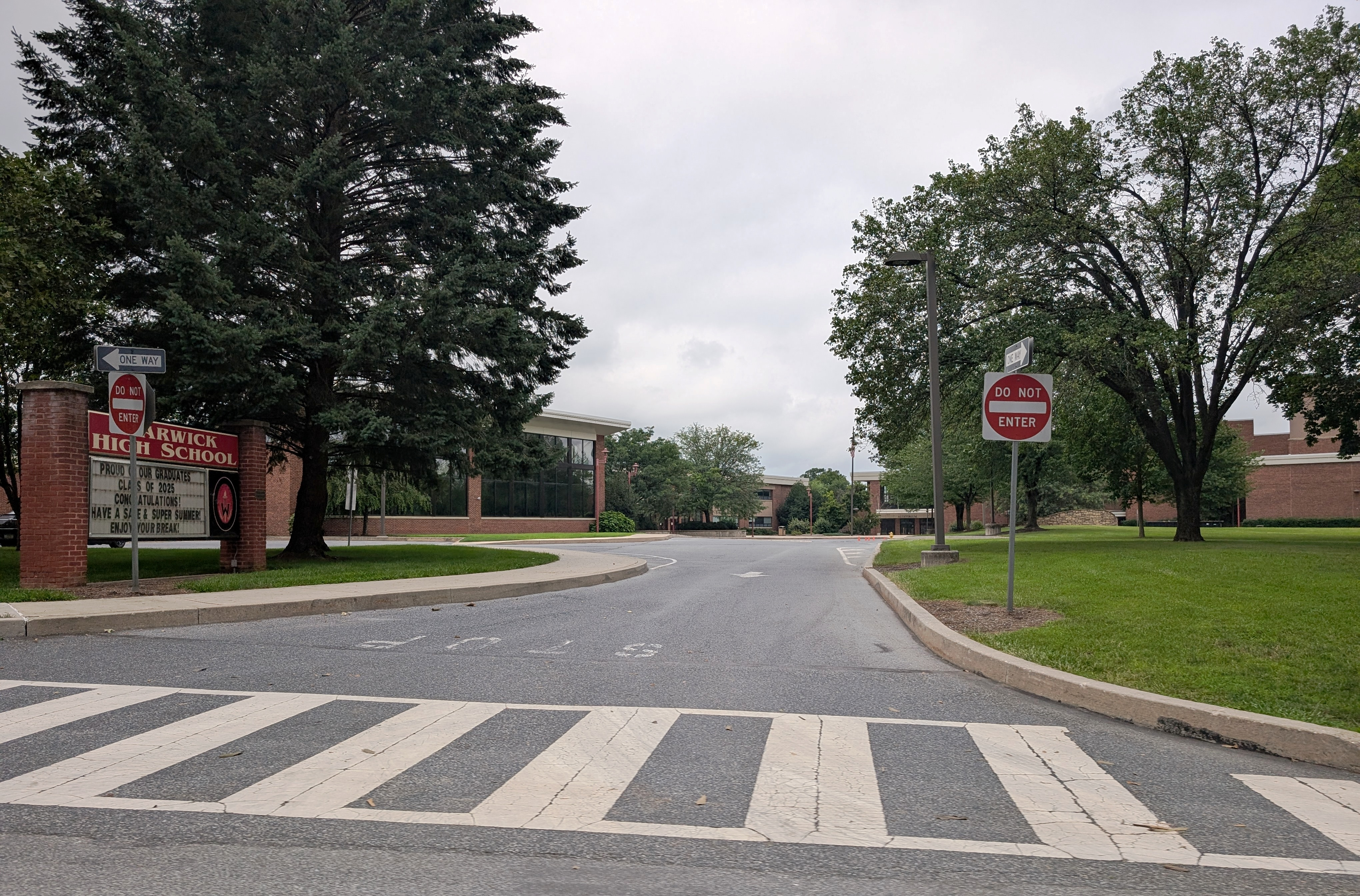
- USGS image of Warwick HS

Location
- 301 W. Orange Street; Lititz, Lancaster County, Pennsylvania 17543; United States; 40.1548°N 76.3145°W

Information
- School type: Public, secondary
- School district: Warwick School District
- Superintendent: Jason Reifsnyder
- Principal: Kristina Szobocsan
- Teaching staff: 89.26 (FTE)
- Grades: 9th–12th
- Enrollment: 1,243 (2023–2024)
- Student to teacher ratio: 13.93
- Colors: Black and red
- Mascot: Warrior
- Feeder schools: Warwick Middle School
- Website: www.warwicksd.org

Warwick High School is a public secondary school in the Warwick School District located in Lititz, Lancaster County, Pennsylvania, United States.

== School history ==
Warwick High School was opened in 1956 and included students in grades six through twelve. Warwick Middle School was opened in 1971, which removed students in grades six through eight, leaving the current ninth- through twelfth-grade configuration. The school district now has four elementary schools for grades K-12: Lititz Elementary, John Beck Elementary, Kissel Hill Elementary, and Bonfield Elementary. The school district has recently renovated the middle school and high school campus, which has provided several new athletic fields for various sporting events. The district is known for its field hockey program, which has produced several Division 1 athletes.

=== Fine arts ===
The school is known for the strength of its music program, notably its marching band, which won three consecutive championships in the Cavalcade of Bands competition circuit from 2006 to 2008.

In addition to success of the high school's curricular music program, many students also participate in a student-run organization called Club for the Integration of the Arts (CIA). Its main event, the coffeehouse, attracts upwards of 200 students (roughly 180 in 2010). The proceeds of this fundraiser are used to fuel art projects and curricula both within the school itself and elsewhere. In 2010 proceeds were donated to Blackfeet Indians in Browning, Montana to help fund their initiative called "Sacred Grounds", an event similar to the CIA's coffeehouse.

== Controversies ==
=== School mascot ===
The high school's current mascot depicts the profile of a Native American warrior. Since 1999, Lititz residents, teachers, and students have criticized the mascot both for being a racist stereotype and for misrepresenting a Native American religious symbol. The campaign to eliminate the mascot resurfaced during the 2009–2010 school year, as the district renovated the high school's football field; plans called for a spear design in the center of the field. In 2010, the district removed the warrior logo from the school's sign, replacing it with a black-and-red seal featuring the letter "W". The warrior image has been used less frequently since 1999. Since then, residents have suggested to the school board that the mascot be changed to something representative of Lititz, such as "Wilbur Buds," a well-known product of the local Wilbur Chocolate Company.

=== 2007 racism incident ===
Warwick High School received press coverage on October 11, 2007, after three white students allegedly yelled racial slurs at minority students outside of the school building. As a result, the students were suspended, and Confederate flags were banned on school property. Several other incidents also occurred in the following days. In response, the community of Lititz commemorated the 2009 Martin Luther King Jr. Day holiday with "a clear statement against racism."

== Alumni ==
- Patrick Cummins (fighter) – professional Mixed Martial Artist for the UFC
- Hayden Rucci – NFL tight end for the San Francisco 49ers
- Nolan Rucci – NFL offensive tackle for the Indianapolis Colts
