= Parochialstrasse in Berlin =

1831 series of paintings by Eduard Gaertner

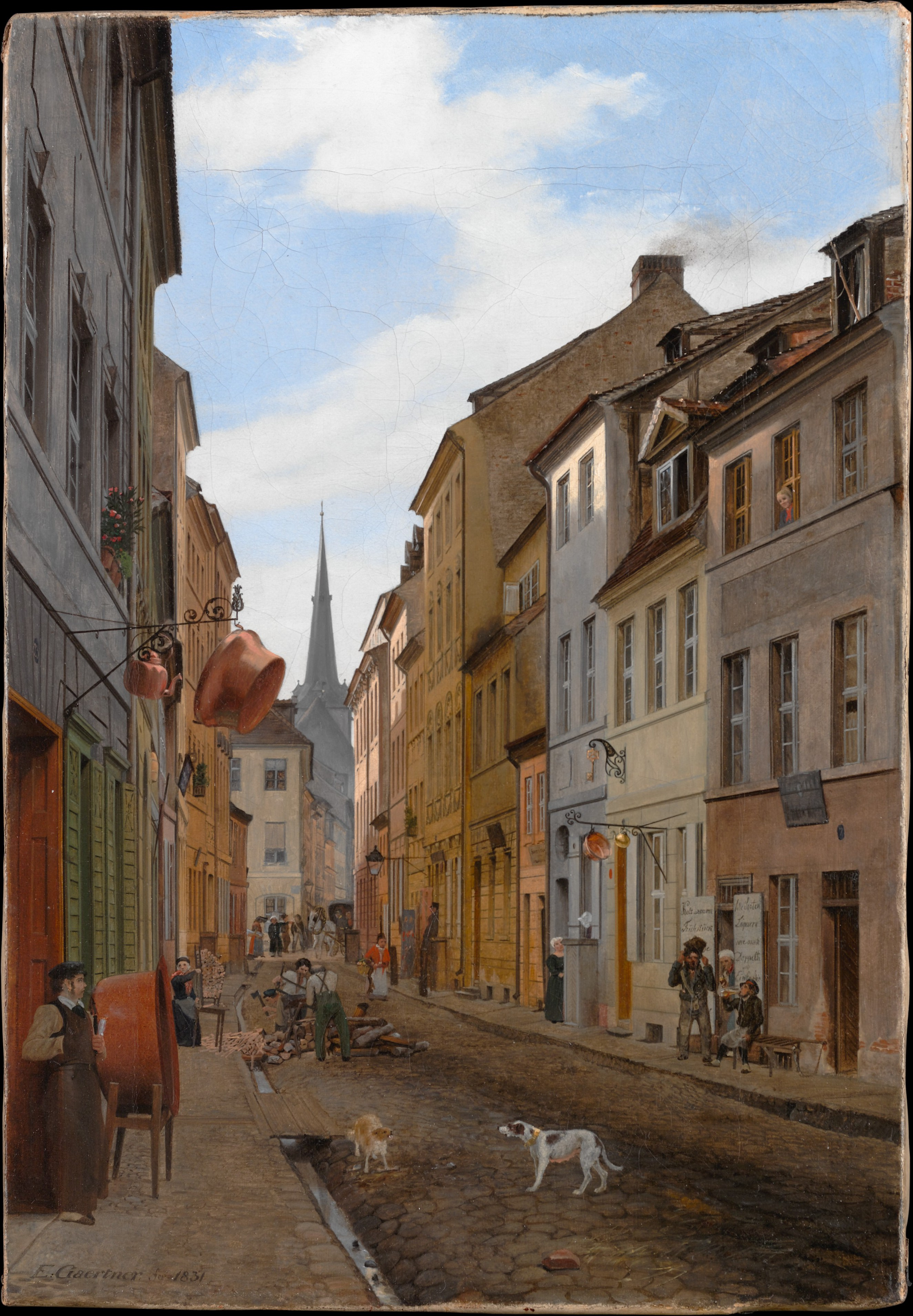
- The version of Parochialstrasse in Berlin in the collection of the Metropolitan Museum of Art. Done in oil on canvas in 1831, the work's dimensions are 16 x 11 in, or 40.6 x 27.9 cm
- Artist: Eduard Gaertner
- Year: 1831
- Medium: Oil on canvas

Parochialstrasse in Berlin is the title of a series of similar paintings by German artist Eduard Gaertner. Done in oil on canvas, the compositions depict the rapidly-industrializing urban landscape of 1830s Berlin, then the capital of the Kingdom of Prussia. The work shows people going about their day, street dogs, and the central street culminates in the Nikolaikirche, Berlin's oldest church. The paintings also show the crossing of Parochialstraße with Jüdenstraße. Three compositions were produced; one is in the collection of the Metropolitan Museum of Art, one was destroyed in World War II, and one is in the collection of the Nationalgalerie in Berlin.
