= St. Nicholas Church, Berlin =

Church in Berlin, Germany

Church of St. Nicholas
- St. Nikolai-Kirche
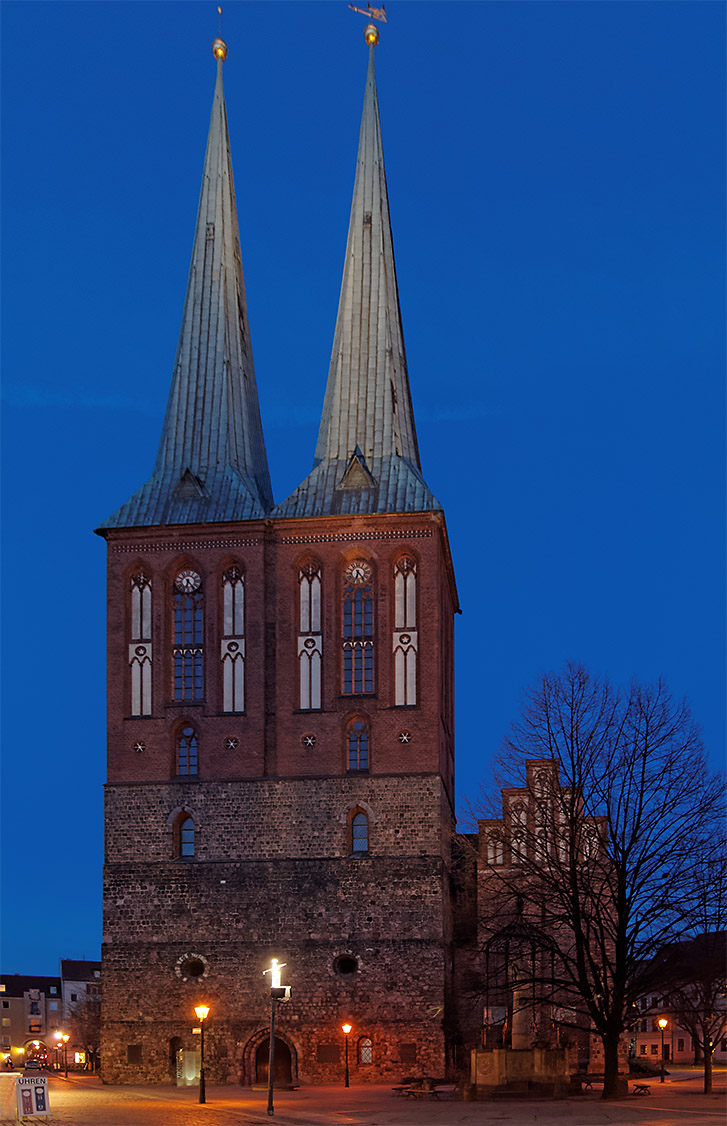
- St. Nicholas's fortified westwork (left) and Our Lady's Chapel (right, added 1452)

Religion
- Affiliation: Deconsecrated since November 1938. Originally Roman Catholic, from 1539 on Lutheran
- District: Last: March of Brandenburg ecclesiastical province, Kirchenkreis Stadt Berlin I (deanery)
- Province: Last: Evangelical Church of the old-Prussian Union

Location
- Location: Nikolaiviertel, a neighborhood of Berlin
- Interactive map of Church of St. Nicholas
- Coordinates: 52°31′00″N 13°24′27″E

Architecture
- Architect: Hermann Blankenstein (1877–1879)
- Completed: Ca. 1243, after burning in the city fire of 11 August 1380 reconstructed until 1470, renovation 1877–1879
- Materials: Brick

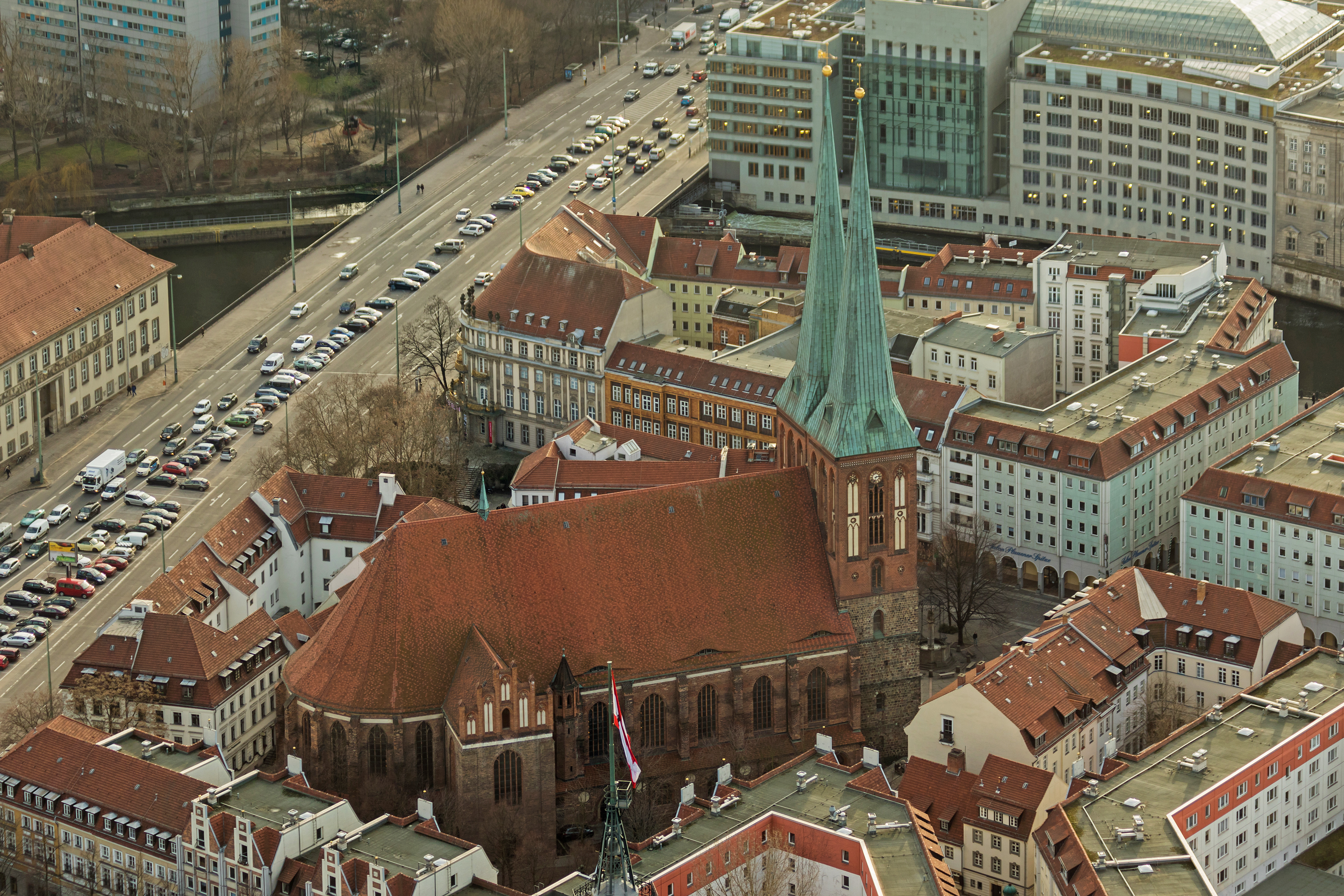
St. Nicholas Church and Nikolaiviertel from above

The St. Nikolai-Kirche (Nikolaikirche or St. Nicholas' Church) is the oldest church in Berlin, the capital of Germany. The church is located in the eastern part of central Berlin, the borough of Mitte. The area around the church, bounded by Spandauer Straße, Rathausstraße, the River Spree and Mühlendamm, is known as the Nikolaiviertel 'Nicholas quarter', and is an area of restored medieval buildings (in some cases recent imitations). The church was built between 1220 and 1230, and is thus, along with the Church of Our Lady at Alexanderplatz not far away, the oldest church in Berlin.

== History ==
Originally a Roman Catholic church, the Church of St. Nicholas adopted Lutheranism after the Reformation reached the Electorate of Brandenburg in 1539. In the 17th century, the prominent hymn-writer Paul Gerhardt was the minister of the church, and the composer Johann Crueger was musical director. The prominent Lutheran theologian Provost Philipp Jacob Spener was the minister from 1691 to 1705. From 1913 to 1923, the minister at the Church of St. Nicholas was Wilhelm Wessel, whose son Horst Wessel later became famous as a Nazi: the family lived in the nearby Jüdenstraße.

On Reformation Day in 1938 (October 31) the church building served its congregation for the last time. Then the building, the oldest structure in Berlin proper, was given up to the government, to be used as a concert hall and ecclesiastical museum. The number of parishioners had shrunk due to the ever intensifying gentrification of the inner city, as residential premises became superseded by offices and shops. The congregation later merged with that of the Church of Our Lady.

During World War II, the Church of St. Nicholas had its roof and the tops of its towers destroyed as a result of Allied bombing. In 1949 all the vaults and the northern pillars collapsed. The ruins were located in East Berlin, and it was not until 1980 that the German Democratic Republic rebuilt the Nikolaikirche between 1980 and 1983 according to historic drawings and plans as part of the reconstruction of the Nikolaiviertel for Berlin's 750th anniversary celebrations in 1987. Thus, the Church of St. Nicholas as seen today is largely a reconstruction. Today the church serves again as a museum and as a regular concert venue, administered by the Stiftung Stadtmuseum Berlin (Landesmuseum für Kultur und Geschichte Berlins). There is an organ recital there almost every Friday at 5pm. It is renowned for its acoustics and the rebuilt church has been equipped with a fine set of 41 bells.

=== Organ ===
The current organ was made by the firm Jehmlich (Dresden). It has 44 stops on three manuals.

I Hauptwerk C–g^{3}
1.	Prinzipal	16′
2.	Quintade	16′
3.	Prinzipal	8′
4.	Spitzflöte	8′
5.	Salicional	8′
6.	Oktave	4′
7.	Flûte d'amour	4′
8.	Quinte	2 2/3′
9.	Oktave	2′
10.	Mixtur V
11.	Scharff IV
12.	Cornett III–V	8′
13.	Trompete	16′
14.	Trompete	8′
	Zimbelstern

II Schwellwerk C–g^{3}
15.	Bordun	16′
16.	Flötenprinzipal	8′
17.	Doppelflöte	8′
18.	Viola da Gamba	8′
19.	Flötenschwebung (ab c^{0})	8′
20.	Weitoktave	4′
21.	Koppelflöte	4′
22.	Nasat
23.	Nachthorn	2′
24.	Terz	1 3/5'
25.	Spitzquinte	1 1/3'
26.	Mixtur V–VI	2′
27.	Holzfagott	16′
28.	Cor anglais	8′
	Tremulant

III Positiv C–g^{3}
29.	Holzgedackt	8′
30.	Prinzipal	4′
31.	Rohrflöte	4′
32.	Prinzipal	2′
33.	Sifflöte	1′
34.	Zimbel II–III
35.	Schalmeiregal	8′
	Tremulant

Pedal C–f^{1}
36.	Prinzipal	16′
37.	Subbass	16′
38.	Oktavbass	8′
39.	Gedackt	8′
40.	Italienisch Prinzipal	4′
41.	Hintersatz V	5 1/3
42.	Fagott	32′
43.	Posaune	16′
44.	Bombarde	8′

- Couplers I/II, III/I, III/II, I/P, II/P, III/P
- 256-position sequencer
