= Altes Stadthaus, Berlin =

German administration building

Altes Stadthaus
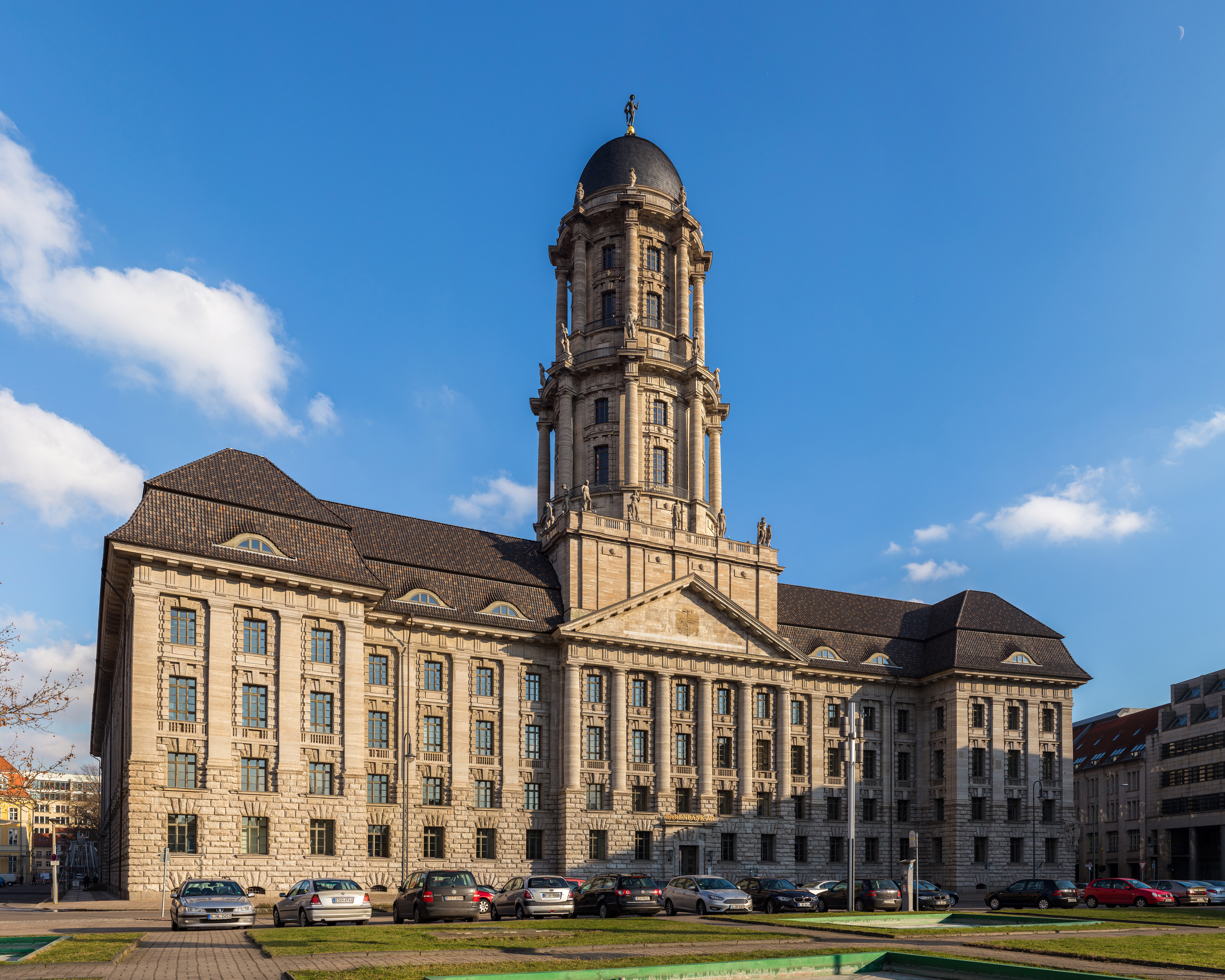
- Altes Stadthaus
- Interactive map of the Altes Stadthaus area

General information
- Type: Municipal administration
- Location: Molkenmarkt, Berlin, Jüdenstraße 34–42
- Coordinates: 52°30′59″N 13°24′39″E
- Construction started: 1902
- Completed: 1911
- Inaugurated: October 29, 1911
- Renovated: 1950–1955; 1994; 1998–1999 (roof)
- Cost: 7,000,000ℳ
- Client: City of Berlin
- Owner: Senate of Berlin

Height
- Height: approx. 80 metres (260 ft)

Technical details
- Floor count: 4 (main)

Design and construction
- Architect: Ludwig Hoffmann

References
- Ludwig Hoffmann; Claudia Fuchs; City of Berlin landmark listing

Altes Stadthaus ("Old City Hall") is a former administrative building in Berlin, Germany, currently used by the Senate. It faces the Molkenmarkt and is bound by four roads; Jüdenstraße, Klosterstraße, Parochialstraße, and Stralauer Straße. Designed by Ludwig Hoffmann, chief of construction for the city, it was built in 1902–11 at a cost of 7 million marks (US$1,750,000) to supplement the Rotes Rathaus.

The building has five courtyards and features many sculptures, including 29 allegorical representations of civic virtues and of Greek deities which are mounted on the tower. A Georg Wrba sculpture of a bear, the symbol of Berlin, is located in the central Bärensaal (Bear Hall).

Originally called the "Neues Stadthaus" (New City House), it became the seat of the Council of Ministers of the GDR after World War II. The building next to it became the center of administration for East Berlin, and was also called "Neues Stadthaus"; to avoid confusion, Neues Stadthaus became known as "Altes Stadthaus" (Old city house).

During World War II, the Allied bombing campaign and fierce fighting in the Battle of Berlin caused severe damage; the roof was almost completely destroyed as were the statues above the rear entrance, and there was substantial water damage. In the first phase of reconstruction in 1951, the statue of the goddess of Fortuna was removed, and is assumed to have been smelted in 1962. The remaining statues, urns, and other carvings on the exterior were removed in 1976–77 due to rain damage. It was completely refurbished in the 1990s and exterior restoration required replacement of some 180 sculptural elements, including the allegorical figures of the virtues, giant vases, window embrasures and one of the columns. The original mansard roof was reconstructed in 1998–99.

== Plans for second city hall ==
In the 1860s, the population of Berlin was growing rapidly with the influx of around 50,000 people a year, creating a large administrative burden. When construction began on the Rotes Rathaus, the city had around half a million inhabitants, but this grew to 800,000 by the time of its completion in 1869. By the 1880s, the city had offices in ten additional buildings near the Rotes Rathaus and since it could not be extended, it was clear that a second administration building was required. (Note: A distinction is made in German between the Rathaus, such as the Rotes Rathaus, where the city council meets, and the Stadthaus, such as the Old (originally New) City Administration Building, which houses additional administrative offices. The predecessor to the Rotes Rathaus, the Altes Stadthaus (German Wikipedia article), stood in front of its site and the remains from its demolition were discovered during subway construction in 2010. "Stadthaus" is more commonly used than "Stadtzentrum", "Gemeindezentrum", "Rathaus" and "Bürgerhaus". See Schäche 2000, p. 4.)

In 1893, the executive committee of the Berlin city council proposed a site on the banks of the river Spree, roughly corresponding to the current location of the Berlin Finance Department and the offices of the Social Association of Germany. The proposal was rejected by the full city council because it would overshadow the city hall. Further proposals were put on hold for several years. After discussing many locations, in 1898, chief of construction Ludwig Hoffmann became involved and the council agreed on Molkenmarkt. The 32 built-up parcels of land on the site were bought up and cleared.

Based on his participation in the debate and his reputation, Hoffmann received the commission to design the new building. Without any kind of competitive bidding or restrictions, he was commissioned to design it with space for approximately 1,000 employees. In 1900, the prosperous city decided the building should feature a tower. Hoffmann's design was accepted in 1901, and demolition of the existing buildings began. The cornerstone was laid in 1902.

== Specifications ==
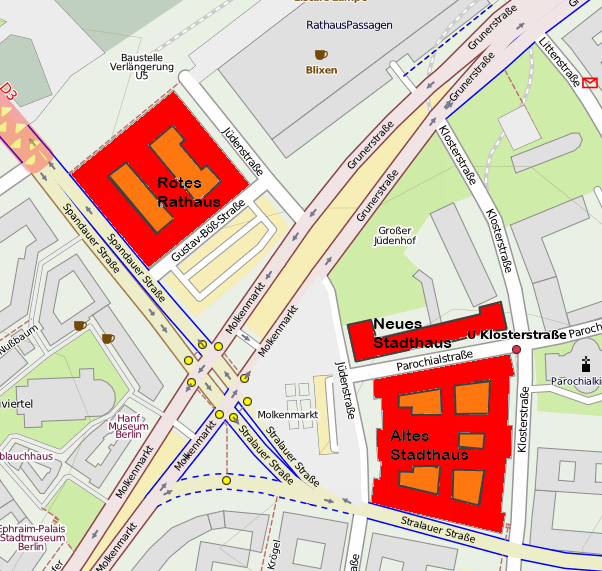
Location of the Altes Stadthaus in Berlin in relation to the New City Administration Building (Neues Stadthaus) and the Rotes Rathaus (Red City Hall).

Hoffmann created a monumental building with five courtyards to "once and for all incorporate the offices of the municipal administration which have no place in the city hall; however, it should in addition include the hall for large-scale public events which the city lacks, and also in its exterior be representative of the Berlin of today and thus be [a] magnificent building distinguished in its monumentality," according to the author of a 1914 monograph to him. (Note: "einmal die Büros der städtischen Verwaltungen, die im Rathaus keinen Platz haben, aufzunehmen; es sollte aber außerdem die Halle für große öffentliche Feiern enthalten, die der Stadt fehlt, und auch nach außen hin das Berlin von heute repräsentieren und also ausgesprochener monumentaler Prunkbau sein." Hoffmann & Stahl 1914, p. viii.) It is his most important Berlin work.

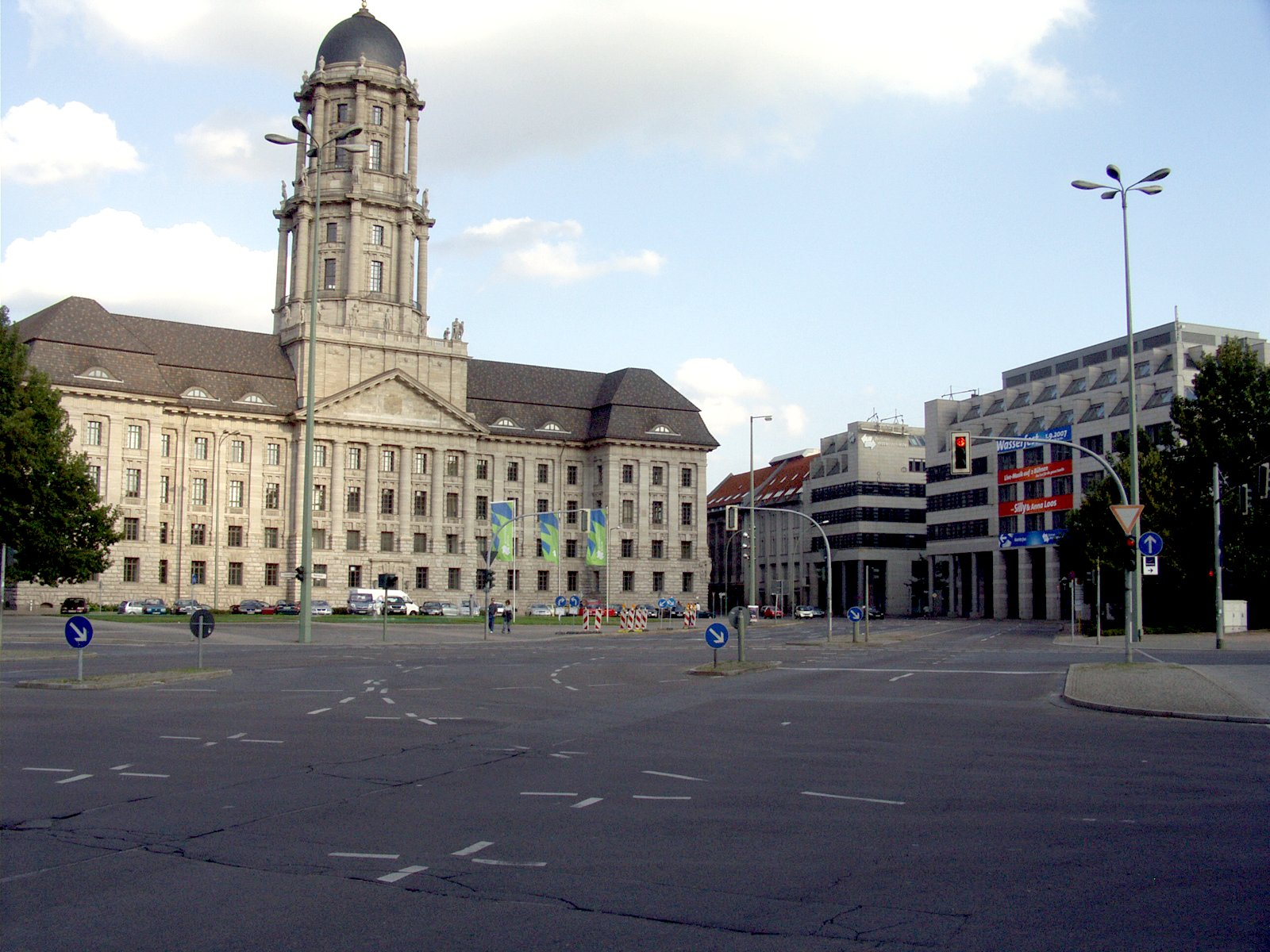
The Altes Stadthaus in Molkenmarkt

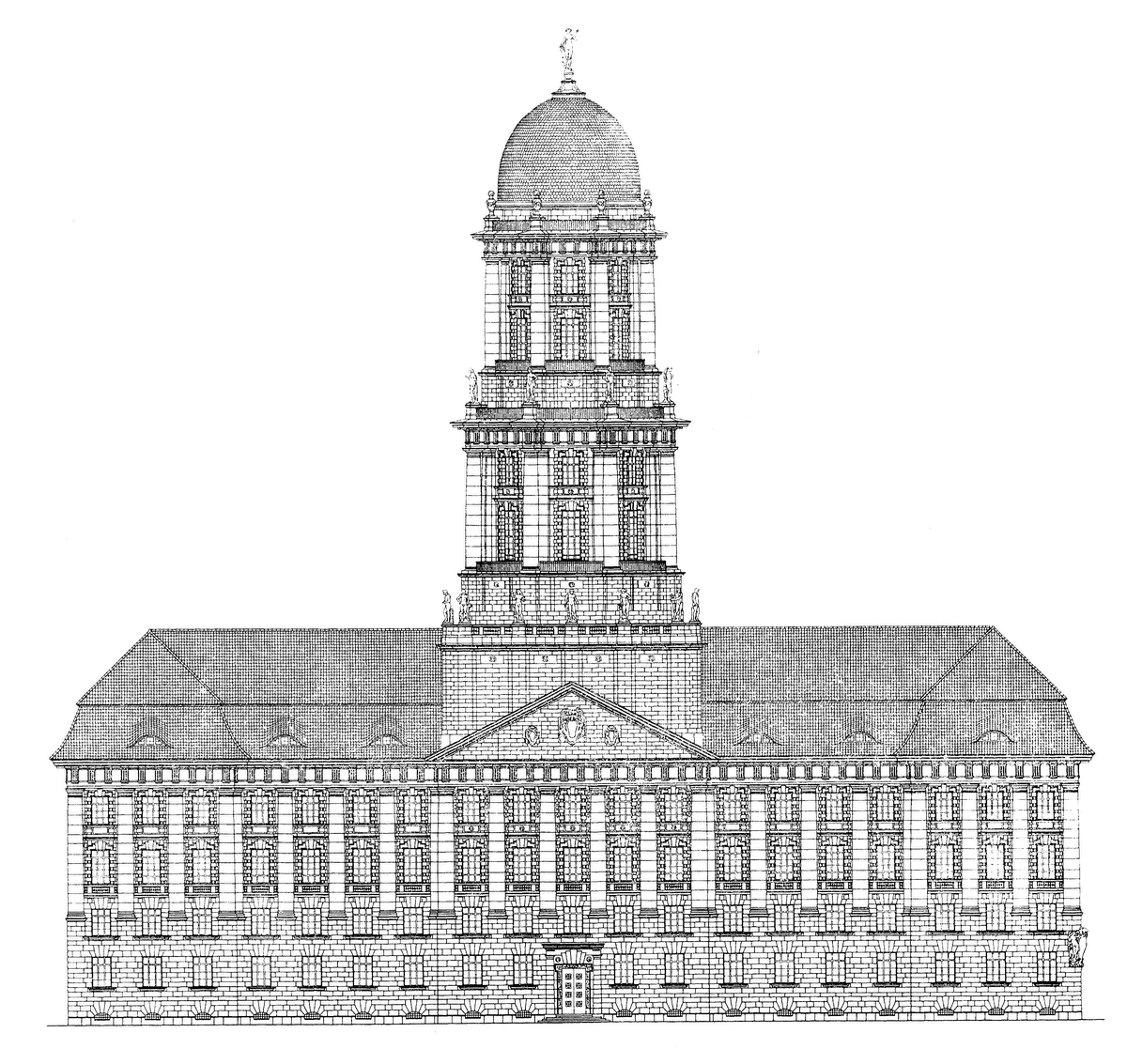
Front façade, facing Jüdenstraße. Drawing by Ludwig Hoffmann

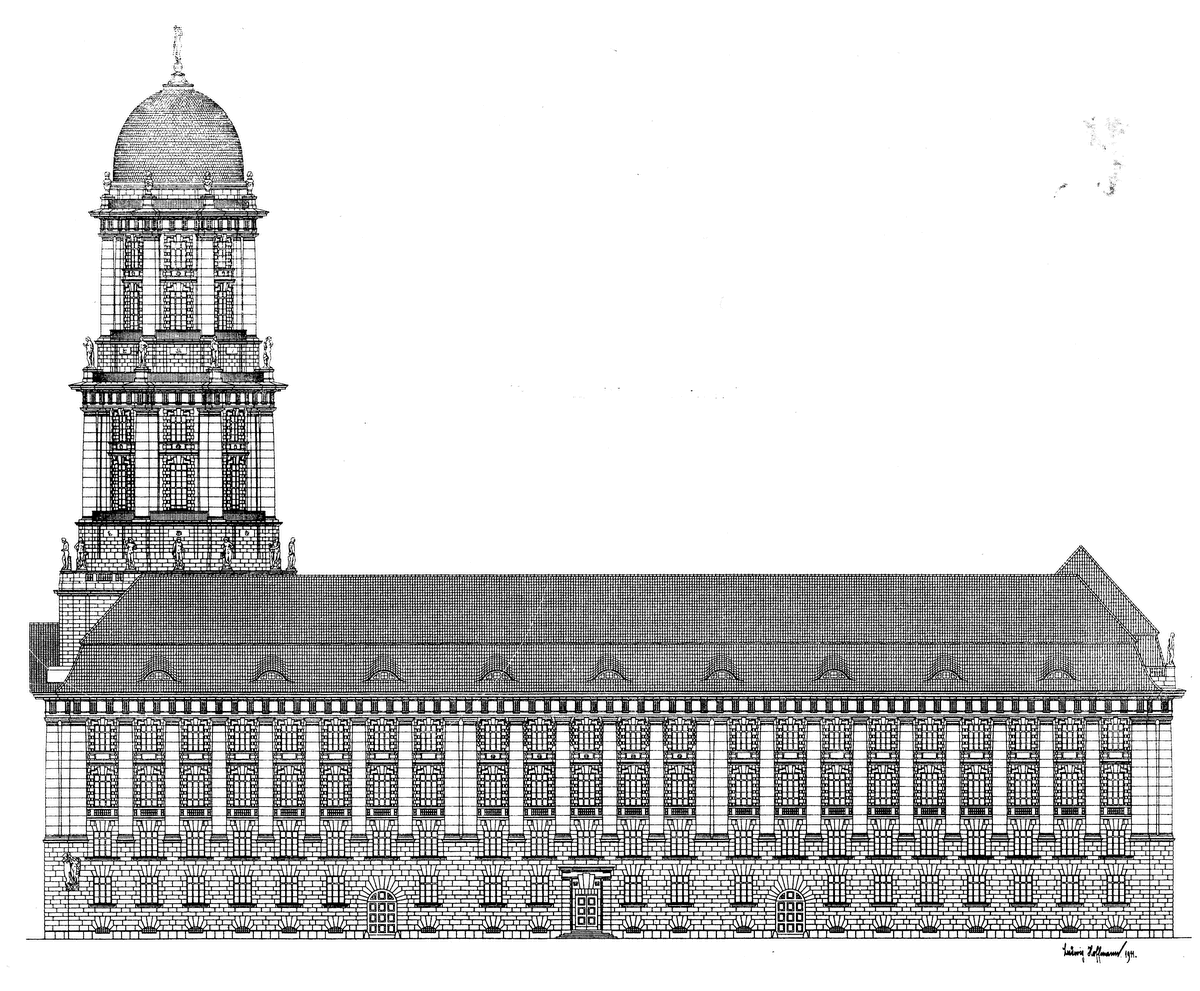
Side view from Stralauer Straße. Drawing by Ludwig Hoffmann

An imposing external feature of the building is the tower, approximately 80 metres (260 ft) tall, which rises from a square base over the central bay facing Judenstraße. Inspired by those designed by Carl von Gontard for the French and German Cathedrals on the Gendarmenmarkt, it consists of a double set of cylinders with encircling columns,. This structure is surmounted by a dome on which a 3.25 metres (10.7 ft) copper sculpture of the goddess Fortuna, by Ignatius Taschner, stands on a gilded globe. It was originally intended to show that Berlin "is taking an upward path in its development".

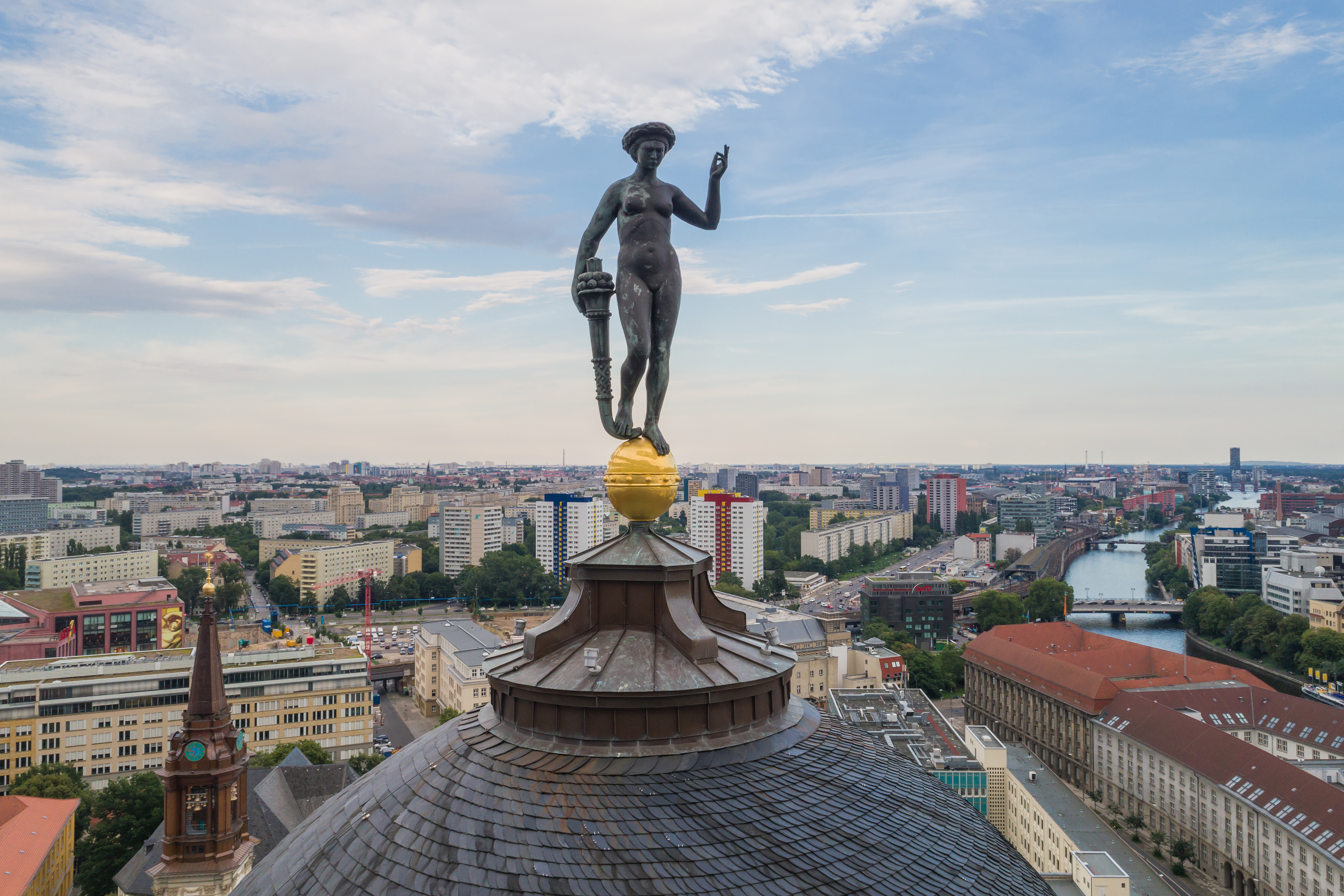
Statue of the goddess Fortuna on the dome of the building

The tower is also adorned with many sculptures, including vases and 29 representations of the civic virtues and Greek deities by Taschner, Josef Rauch, Georg Wrba and William Widemann. In the centre of the building is a barrel-vaulted hall three stories high capable of accommodating 1,500 people and decorated in Jugendstil style. The walls over the doorways are inscribed with moral sayings, and the room originally had a floor of red Verona marble, six ceremonial candelabra, and three bronze gates, all by Georg Wrba. In addition, the room contains a 400 kilograms (880 lb) bronze bear, the symbol of Berlin, commissioned from Wrba by the city in 1911, giving the hall its name, Bärensaal (Bear Hall). Wrba placed the bear in a symbolic setting signifying the bases of European culture; the height of the plinth on which it stands places the viewer at belly level creating a respectful distance, it stands in a triangle signifying the Trinity and in association with a Solomonic saying and depictions of Greco-Roman deities.

The building has an irregular trapezoidal footprint corresponding to that of the group of buildings that formerly occupied the site presenting some difficulties in symmetry. It was also originally enclosed by other buildings, (Note: See for example the title page photo, Fleischmann et al. 1999.) so Hoffmann's design emphasizes its appearance from close by rather than from a distance. The facades, executed in grey muschelkalk, are articulated with reference to the principles of Palladian architecture and based on the Palazzo Thiene in Vicenza. A rusticated plinth comprising the first floor and half the height of the mezzanine is surmounted by columns and pilasters in Tuscan order comprising two and a half stories, above which is a mansard roof. The lack of alignment with the stories is an intentional variation from the model. The facades facing the Jüdenstraße, Klosterstraße, Parochialstraße and Stralauer Straße are 82.63 metres (271.1 ft), 126.93 metres (416.4 ft), 108.31 metres (355.3 ft) and 94.46 metres (309.9 ft) long, respectively. The main entrances are in the centre of projecting bays on the Jüdenstraße (front) and Klosterstraße (rear) facades, with the "Bear Hall" on the axis between them. The side wings forming the facades on the Parochialstraße and Stralauer Straße sides terminate in projecting bays at the ends of these two primary facades. Cross wings and an opening in the main axis between the vestibule on the rear, Klosterstraße side and the "Bear Hall" create five courtyards within the building. The vestibules at the main, Judenstraße entrance and the rear entrance on Klosterstraße are lined with the same stone as the exterior to create a sense that the grand public rooms were also part of the city outside; in the latter, Hoffmann placed a large wall fountain also of Verona marble.

== Opening ==
Construction lasted for nine and a half years, from April 1902 until October 1911, with the tower construction alone taking three years (1908–11). Different departments of the city administration moved in at different times with some, such as the police department, moving in as early as March 1908. The building was formally opened by Mayor Martin Kirschner on October 29, 1911.

== During the Weimar Republic and the Third Reich ==
Until the 1920s, there were no significant changes to the building. Neither World War I nor the November revolution of 1918 caused damage to it. In 1920, the administrative burden was considerably increased by the incorporation of several outlying towns and villages into the city of Berlin in the Greater Berlin Act. As a result, some departments and units had to be housed outside the building. In 1929, the Magistrat commissioned the city planning division to develop a concept for a new administrative building encompassing two city blocks that would also link the Stadthaus to the City Hall. This plan also included the existing main city library and the city savings bank. It would have been part of a wideranging plan to redevelop the area of the Molkenmarkt, including replacement of the old and substandard housing along Am Krögel, an alley leading to the Spree. These plans had to be abandoned in 1931 because of the political and economic situation of Berlin after World War I.

After the Nazis came to power in 1933, the Magistrat revived the urban renewal plan as an appropriate contribution to the "program of national renewal". However, the Ministry of Transportation was charged with developing a new canal that would require replacing the Mühlendamm bridge and removing a number of buildings. A plan was developed to create an "administrative forum" around the Molkenmarkt, which would include a new centralized mint, the Fire Society Building that today is the Neues Stadthaus, and a residence for a City President but retain the Stadthaus flanked by two large new wings. This plan superseded the former housing concept. The Krögel block was demolished in 1936 and the Fire Society Building was completed in 1938. By the outbreak of war in 1939, the Mint and one other government building had also been completed.

In World War II the building suffered some damage during the Allied bombing campaign, but was later severely damaged during the Battle for Berlin towards the end of the war. The roof was almost completely destroyed by fire and there was substantial water damage. The statues above the rear entrance, on Klosterstraße, were also destroyed. Assessments estimated that 50% of the building had suffered damage.

== Post-war ==
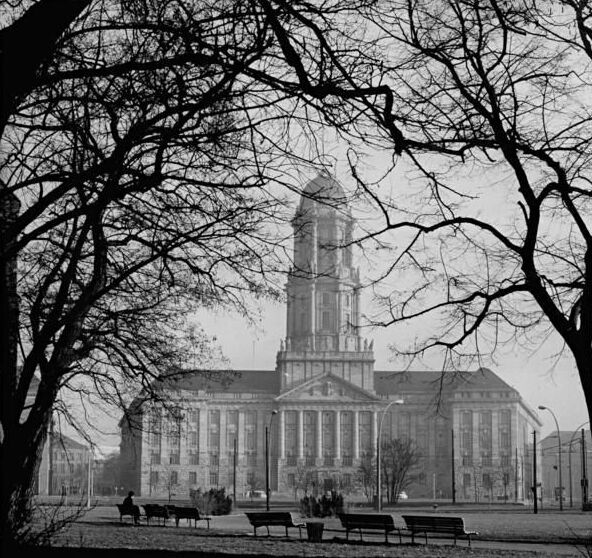
Altes Stadthaus in the 1960s

Shortly after the official surrender of the Wehrmacht on May 8, 1945, the Soviet military administration, headed by Nikolai Berzarin, looked for capable anti-fascists to form a new public administration. On 19 May Berzarin appointed a new 19-member Magistrat under Arthur Werner as acting Governing Mayor. However, both the Rotes Rathaus and the Stadthaus were so damaged that the Fire Society Building adjacent to the Administration Building became the new seat of the Magistrat, and became known as "Neues Stadthaus". Since then, the former "new" building has been known as Altes Stadthaus, to distinguish it from that building.

The Department of Construction was developing schemes for the building as early as 1948. The most urgent need was for a new roof. Two alternatives emerged: an accurate reconstruction of the mansard roof, or a flat pitched roof. Timber was in short supply, so a pitched roof requiring 214 square metres (2,300 sq ft) of timber was chosen, instead of a mansard roof requiring 930 square metres (10,000 sq ft). Issues of landmark preservation played featured little in the decision and starting from 1948 the roof was partially replaced with a pitched roof.

By 1950, 45% of the necessary repairs had been made to Altes Stadthaus by a few simple expedients such as emergency roofing. In the immediate post-war years, neither manpower, supplies, nor financing was available to undertake repairs on a larger scale. The reconstruction took place between 1950 and 1955 in five phases; the first focused on building up the courtyard wing on the Stralauer Straße side while the second phase, completed in early 1952, focused on the Stralauer Straße/Judenstraße wing and included construction of additional offices on the fourth floor and a 300-person dining hall with kitchen. However, for a number of reasons most significant of which was that the building was not the seat of government, the remaining three phases were not carried out. In addition, the reconstruction of Wilhelmine architecture was not a high priority, where as housing was and so funding for the restoration work was not included in the economic plan.

In effect, the building had become the "third city hall"; it housed some government departments, such as planning and housing. Although the office space was fully occupied, the "Bear Hall" and the tower rooms remained unused except for some exhibits of plans by the City Construction Supervisor, Hans Scharoun, and so were left unheated leading to damp and mould damage. The tower was eventually used by the Stasi.

In 1955, after five years of reconstruction, the Rotes Rathaus was fully operational and departments were able to move back into it from both administration buildings and from other more remote locations. Early in the same year, it was announced that Altes Stadthaus was to be transferred from the Magistrat (now of East Berlin, West Berlin having established the separate Berlin Senate) to the Council of Ministers of the GDR, which had been established in 1949, to house the significantly increased workforce. Altes Stadthaus was planned to be only an interim solution to this problem. Prime Minister Otto Grotewohl moved his offices into the building later that year, after renovation work to create appropriate accommodations that included furnishings for various official rooms, the planned expansion onto the fourth floor, upgrading of the stairways, ventilation equipment, and electrical work had been completed. Red carpets were laid in hallways and stair landings, and eventually paper shredders were placed in all offices. Between 1958–61, the building was extensively altered. The inner courtyard was covered and the "Bear Hall" was converted into the chamber of the Council of Ministers. The hall capacity was reduced from 1,500 to 300 people, the windows and arcades on the long sides were closed off, wood wall moldings and a suspended ceiling installed to create a modern room within the space. The candelabra, bronze door grilles, and marble flooring were removed. In 1959, the bear statue was also removed and installed in the newly opened East Berlin zoo in Friedrichsfelde. A security zone was created at the front of the building. The public entrance to what was now the "Building of the Council of Ministers" was now on Klosterstraße. The main entrance facing Jüdenstraße, over which the GDR national emblem, the hammer and compass, was installed in place of the arms of the City of Berlin, was only opened on special occasions. The alterations demonstrated the negative opinion in the GDR of Wilhelmine architecture, and cost 2 million marks. (Note: "pompous, bombastic, gloomy, and no longer appropriate for contemporary needs".)

The statue of the goddess Fortuna on the dome was removed in the first phase of reconstruction in 1951 and replaced by a 13 metres (43 ft) antenna for broadcast transmissions. After the Television Tower came into service in 1969, this was in turn replaced by a flagpole flying the national flag. The statue was stored inside the dome until the 1960s but is last mentioned in the records in 1962 and is assumed to have been melted down. The remaining statues, urns, and other carvings on the exterior of the building remained in place until 1976/77, when they were also removed and placed in storage in Friedrichsfelde and other locations, as they had been seriously damaged by rain and frost.

In 1974–75, the reception and meeting rooms were further upgraded with extensive use of imported goods from the West. However, over time, Altes Stadthaus became less important to the GDR government. Important events, celebrations and ceremonies took place in the Rotes Rathaus, the Palace of the Republic or the State Council Building. The historical high point in the use of the building under the GDR came in its final phase, when the only freely elected government of East Germany, under Lothar de Maizière relocated there. The provisions of the agreement on German reunification were therefore negotiated there.

== Complete refurbishment in the 1990s ==
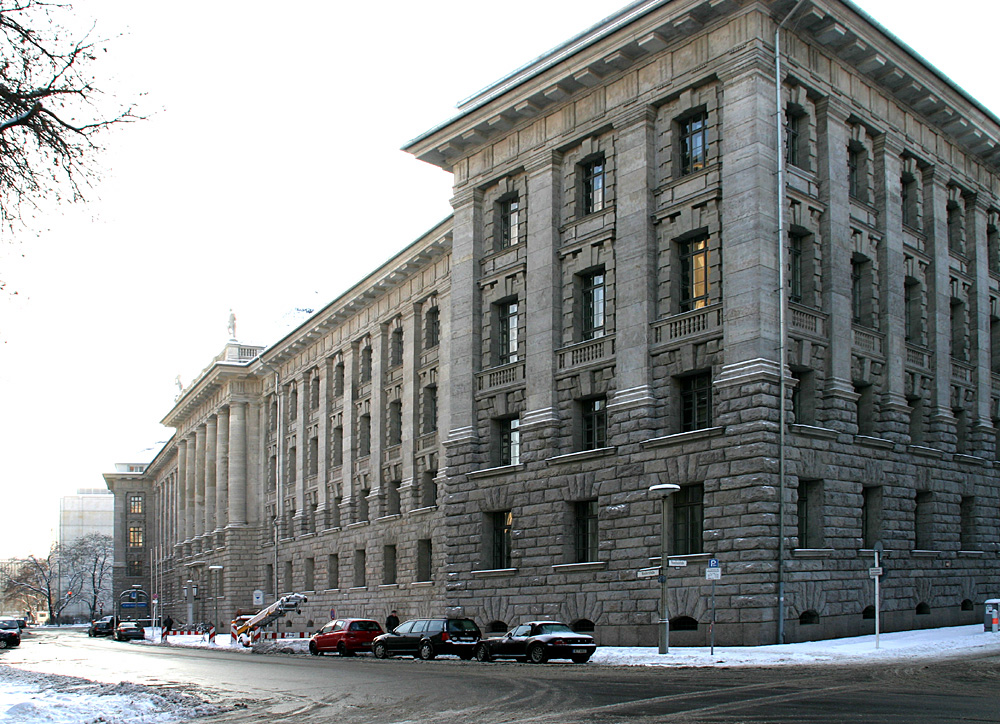
Rear facade of Altes Stadthaus, on Klosterstraße

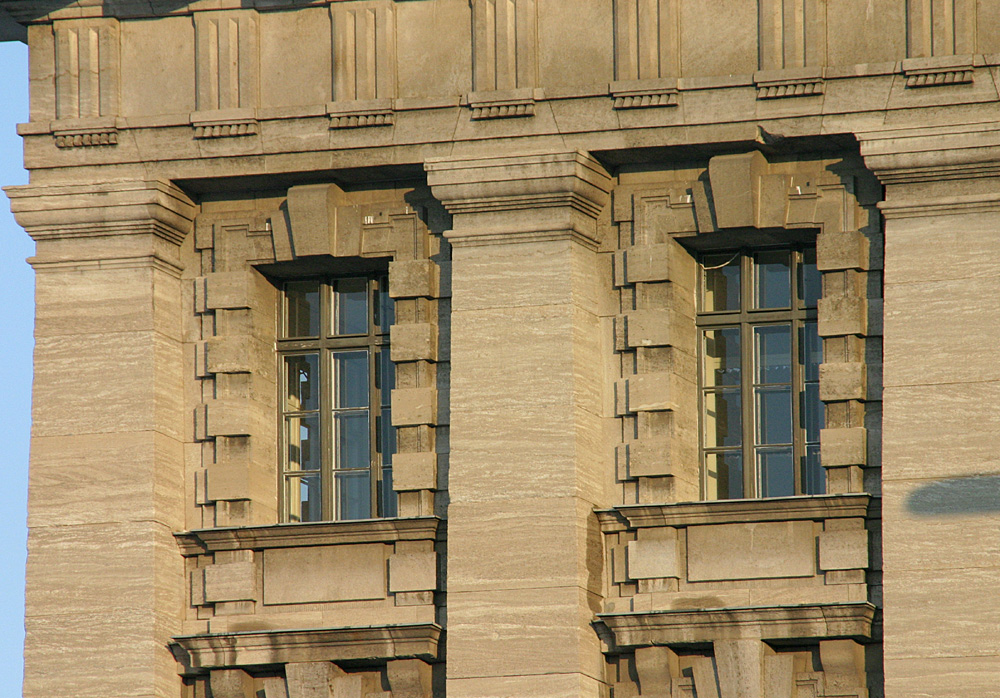
Typical window framing detail on the top floor

The GDR emblem was removed from over the main entrance in 1990, the year of reunification, leaving a dark patch. Following reunification, the Berlin offices of the German Chancellery and the Ministry of Labor and Social Affairs moved into the building. In January 1993, after a legal decision, the Federal Government returned the building to the Federal State of Berlin, which wished to use it for its original purpose of city administration. However, it first urgently required refurbishment; under the GDR, upkeep had been neglected and the plumbing facilities, for example, dated in part to the 1920s. Access also needed to be provided for the handicapped.

Renovation began in 1994 under the direction of architect Gerhard Spangenberg, with the objective of returning the building so far as possible to its original condition while not ignoring the events of the more recent past. The first priority was the removal of iron girders, particle board, and chipboards. Relics of the GDR period deemed worthy of preservation were placed either in the Museum of German History in the former Prussian arsenal or in the House of History in Bonn. The original murals and reliefs, painted over and enclosed during the GDR period, were then restored. The fountain in the Klosterstraße vestibule was accurately recreated. Four bronze bear sculptures by Ignatius Taschner were returned from the Märkisches Museum and reinstalled on replacement stone columns in the Judenstraße vestibule. Exterior restoration of the building required either restoration or replacement with replicas of some 180 sculptural elements from the tower, including the allegorical figures of the virtues, giant vases, window embrasures, and one of the columns, which had bomb damage and had merely been patched. In addition, the original mansard roof was reconstructed in 1998/99 on the west, main facade facing Jüdenstraße. The technical facilities were also updated, including ventilation equipment, elevators, lighting, and plumbing. It proved impossible to use the tower for offices because it lacked the second exit required by safety regulations. This was later rectified by the addition of office space in the roof cavity.

A replacement 300 kilograms (660 lb) statue of Fortuna was created by restoration expert Bernd-Michael Helmich based on a model made by Joost van der Velden from a miniature. On September 2, 2004, it was hoisted to the top of the dome using a tower crane. The replacement of the Fortuna statue was financed by entrepreneur and art patron Peter Dussmann at a cost of €125,000. The restoration of the statues to the tower was delayed by a dispute with one of the contracted companies, which had gone bankrupt.

The renovation also included restoration of the "Bear Hall", which reopened on June 21, 1999. After the zoo in Friedrichsfelde had requested and received a copy at a cost of 30,000 marks, the bronze bear was transported back to the building in June 2001. A replica plinth had been constructed for it.

The restoration of the building, estimated in 2001 to cost 150 million marks, was largely paid for by the federal and Berlin state governments. Some financing was contributed by British mobile phone company Vodafone, which paid 100,000 marks for a giant red advertising banner that concealed the scaffolding around the tower for a year.

The building is again the location of the Berlin Senate Department of Internal Affairs, which moved in during 1997. The registry office for the Borough of Mitte was also located in the building for a while, but has exchanged quarters with the Department of Historic Monuments. The parliament of the borough of Mitte also met there. In 2008, plans were announced for the Constitutional Protection Division of the State Department of Internal Affairs to also move to the building, after which all divisions of the department would be housed there. As of 2012, these plans are still being considered in the city council.

== Notes and references ==
=== Notes ===
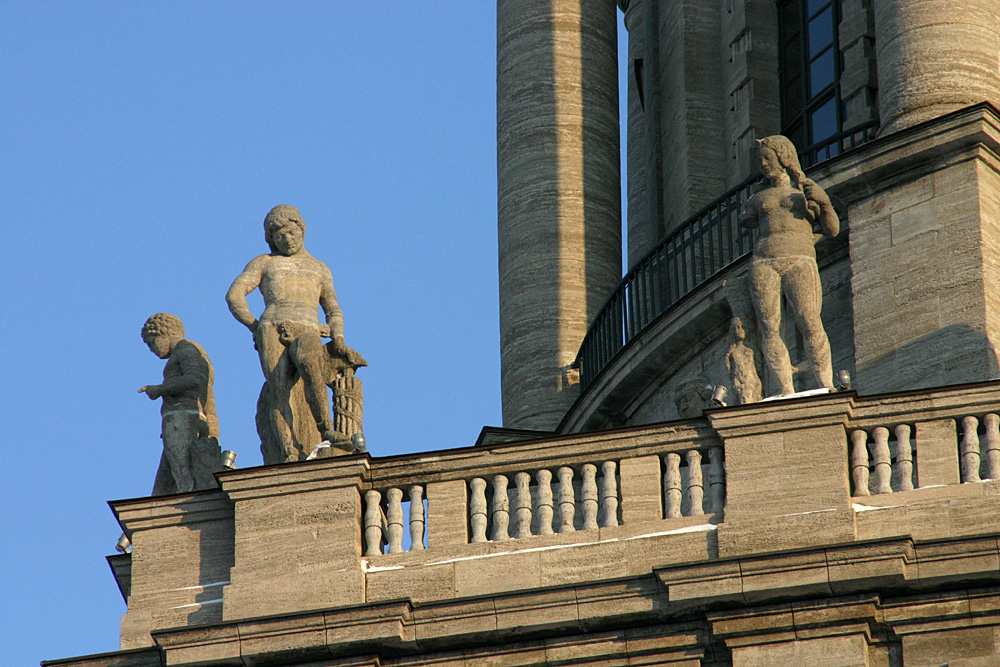
Some of the allegorical representations of the civic virtues on the tower

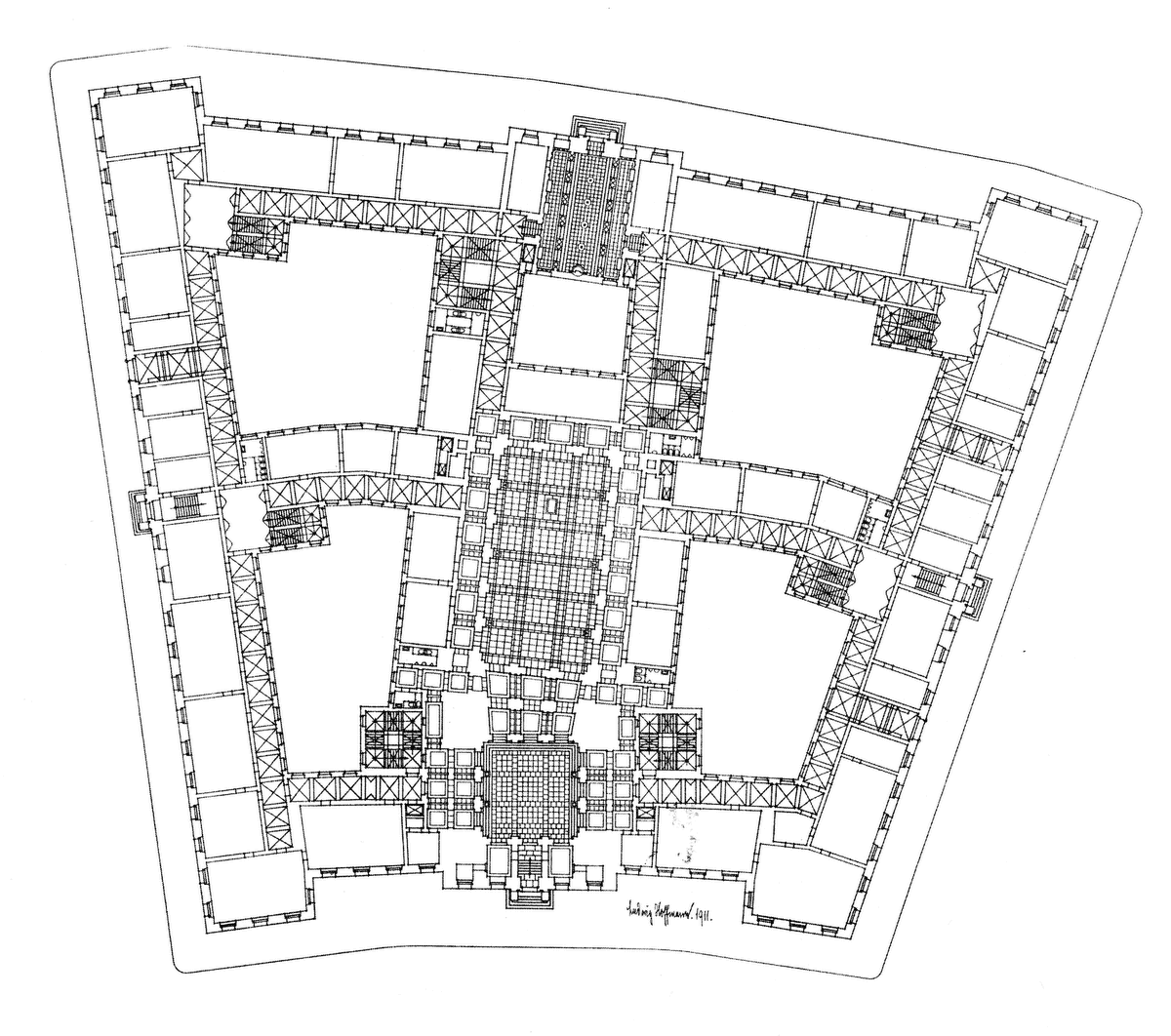
Ground floor plan, showing courtyards and irregular trapezoidal shape

=== Bibliography ===
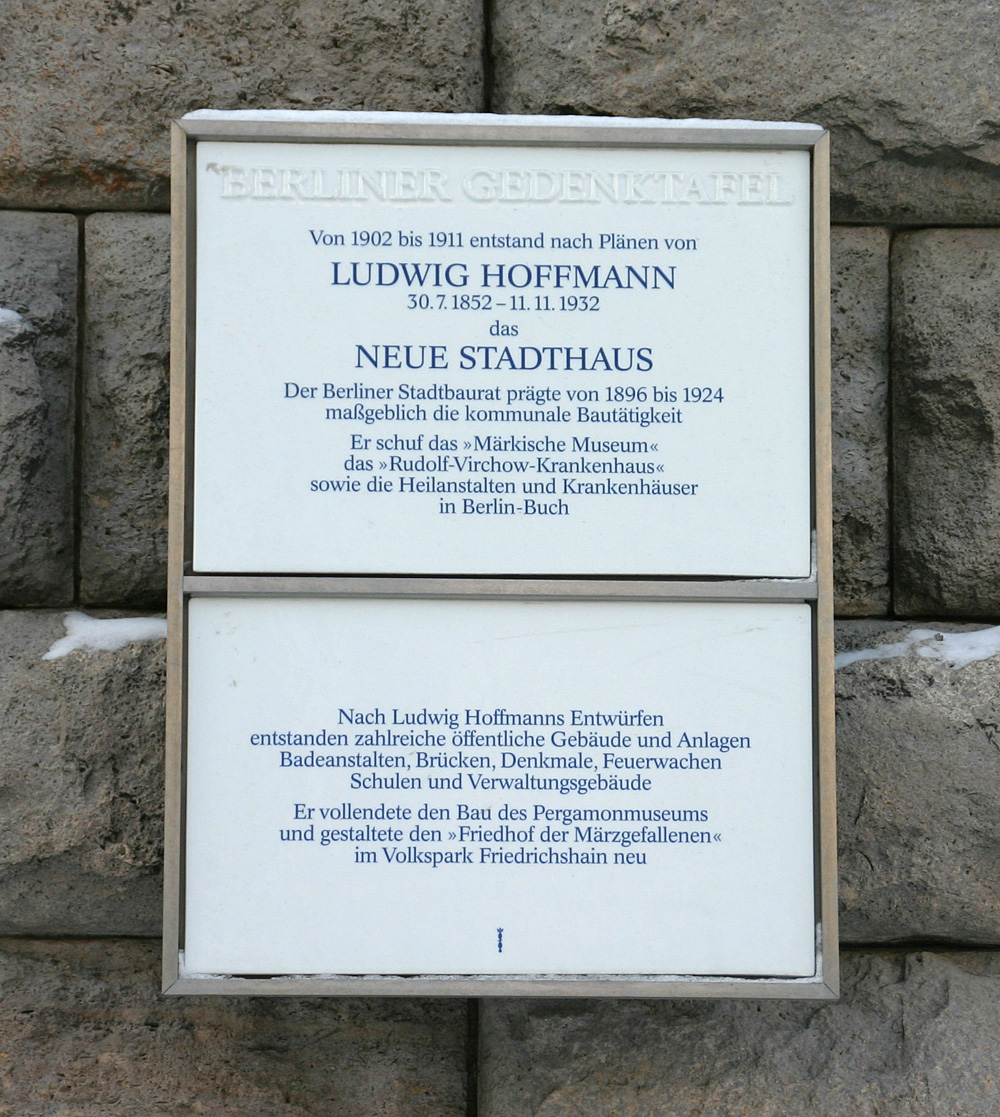
Berlin commemorative plaques on Hoffmann and the old administration building

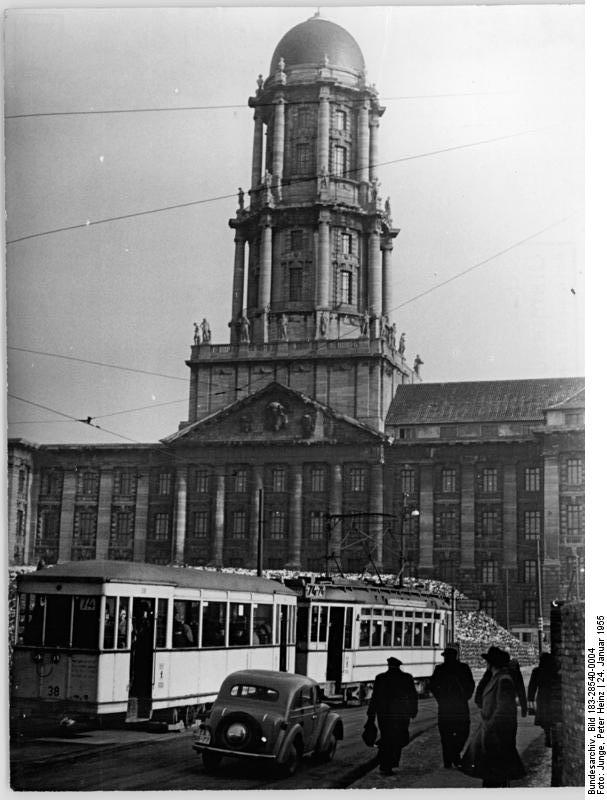
Tram in front of the Stadthaus in 1955

- Abromeit, Lars (June 14, 2001). "Geklontes Wappentier". Berliner Zeitung (in German). ISSN 0947-174X.
- "Altes Stadthaus". Denkmale in Berlin (Landmarks) (in German). Ministry of City Administration and the Environment, Senate of Berlin. March 25, 2008.
- alu (June 7, 2004). "Steinsäulen kehren ins Alte Stadthaus zurück: Kunstwerke waren vor 54 Jahren beim Umbau entfernt worden". Die Welt (in German). ISSN 0173-8437.
- Aulich, Uwe (October 14, 2002). "Turm mit neuer Glücksgöttin". Berliner Zeitung (in German). ISSN 0947-174X.
- Caspar, Helmut (February 21, 1995). "Neue Aufgaben für das Alte Stadthaus". Berliner Zeitung (in German). ISSN 0947-174X.
- Fait, Joachim (1992). "I". Berlín (in German). Prestel-Verlag. ISBN 978-3-7913-1183-8.
- Fleischmann, Peter; Schmidt, Norbert; Reichelt, Monika, eds. (1999). Festschrift zur Wiedereröffnung des Bärensaals im Alten Stadthaus Berlin am 21. Juni 1999 (PDF) (in German). Berlin: Senatsverwaltung für Inneres, Berlin. Archived from the original (PDF) on 2017-04-13.
- Fleischmann, Peter (n.d.). "Die Rückkehr des Bären in die Große Festhalle ("Bärensaal")". Das Alte Stadthaus (in German). Berlin Senate Department of Internal Affairs and Sport. Archived from the original on December 12, 2012.
- Fuchs, Claudia (August 17, 2004). "Fortunas Rückkehr". Berliner Zeitung (in German). ISSN 0947-174X.
- Goebel, Benedikt (2003). Der Umbau Alt-Berlins zum modernen Stadtzentrum: Planungs-, Bau- und Besitzgeschichte des historischen Berliner Stadtkerns im 19. und 20. Jahrhundert. Schriftenreihe des Landesarchivs Berlin (in German). Vol. 6. Berlin: Braun. ISBN 978-3-935455-31-2.
- Hauser, Hans (2000). "Fortuna auf die Kuppel: Das alte Stadthaus erhält seinen Skulpturenschmuck zurück". Berlinische Monatsschrift (in German) (5). Berlin: Luisenstädtischer Bildungsverein: 63–65. ISSN 0944-5560.
- Hein, Rainer L. (April 19, 2005). "Streit um Stadthaus-Statuen: Richter setzt Termin". Die Welt (in German). ISSN 0173-8437.
- Hoffmann, Ludwig (1911). "Neues Stadthaus, Berlin". Neubauten der Stadt Berlin (in German). 10. Technische Universität Berlin Architecture Museum (on-line facsimile).
- Hoffmann, Ludwig; Stahl, Fritz (1914). Ludwig Hoffmann. Berliner Architekturwelt Sonderhefte (in German). Vol. 14. Berlin: Ernst Wasmuth. OCLC 4320395.
- kört (September 3, 2001). "Mitte: Altes Stadthaus wird mit neuem Poster eingekleidet". Der Tagesspiegel (in German).
- Ladd, Brian (1998). The Ghosts of Berlin: Confronting German History in the Urban Landscape. Berlin: University of Chicago Press. pp. 226–. ISBN 978-0-226-46762-7.
- Lehrke, Gerhard (August 26, 2005). "Gericht befreit entführte Giganten". Berliner Kurier (in German).
- Michel, Kai (November 28, 2001). "Monument des Bürgertums: Ein Buch löst Debatten um die Restaurierung des Berliner Stadthauses aus". Berliner Zeitung (in German). ISSN 0947-174X.
- "Verfassungsschutz zieht ins Alte Stadthaus nach Mitte". Die Welt (in German). February 7, 2008. ISSN 0173-8437.
- Pfälzische Gesellschaft zur Förderung der Wissenschaften (1961). Pfälzer Heimat (in German). Vol. 12–14. GES.
- Schäche, Wolfgang, ed. (2000). Das Stadthaus. Geschichte, Bestand und Wandel eines Baudenkmals (in German). Berlin: Jovis. ISBN 978-3-931321-36-9.
- Schulte-Peevers, Andrea; Haywood, Anthony; O'Brien, Sally (1 March 2009). Berlin. Lonely Planet. ISBN 978-1-74104-852-0.
- Verein Entwicklungsgemeinschaft Alexanderplatz; Senatsverwaltung für Stadtentwicklung und Umweltschutz. Referat Öffentlichkeitsarbeit (9 December 1994). Alexanderplatz: Städtebaulicher Ideenwettbewerb (in German). Ernst & Sohn. ISBN 978-3-433-02477-5.

=== Further reading ===
- Eckert, Hajo (January 2, 2004). "Sanierung des Stadthauses verzögert sich um Monate". Berliner Morgenpost (in German).
- "Die Giganten kehren auf das Alte Stadthaus zurück". Berliner Morgenpost (in German). December 6, 2005.
- Hansen, Antje (2006). Das alte Stadthaus in Berlin (in German). Munich: Deutscher Kunstverlag. ISBN 978-3-422-02029-0.
- Hein, Rainer L. (August 31, 2004). "Fortuna kehrt zurück". Berliner Morgenpost (in German).
- Schubert, Peter (August 20, 2002). "Fortuna soll Stadthaus Glück bringen". Berliner Morgenpost (in German).
- Trost, Heinrich, ed. (1983) [1979]. Die Bau- und Kunstdenkmale in der DDR. Hauptstadt Berlin (in German). Vol. I. Munich and Berlin: Beck and Henschel. ISBN 978-3-406-09599-3.
