= Molkenmarkt =

Public square in Berlin

Coordinates: 52°31′00″N 13°24′36″E

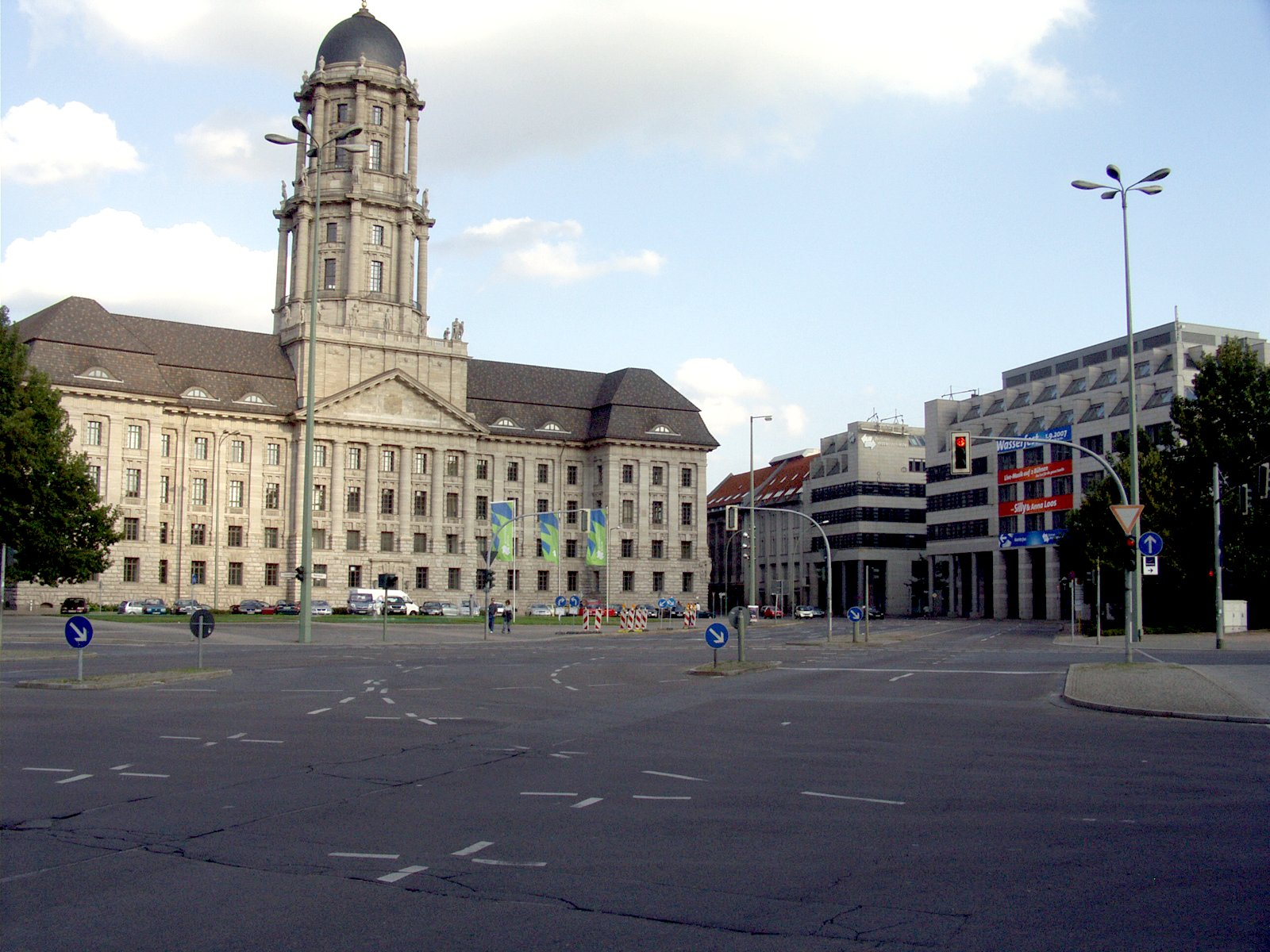
Molkenmarkt and Altes Stadthaus

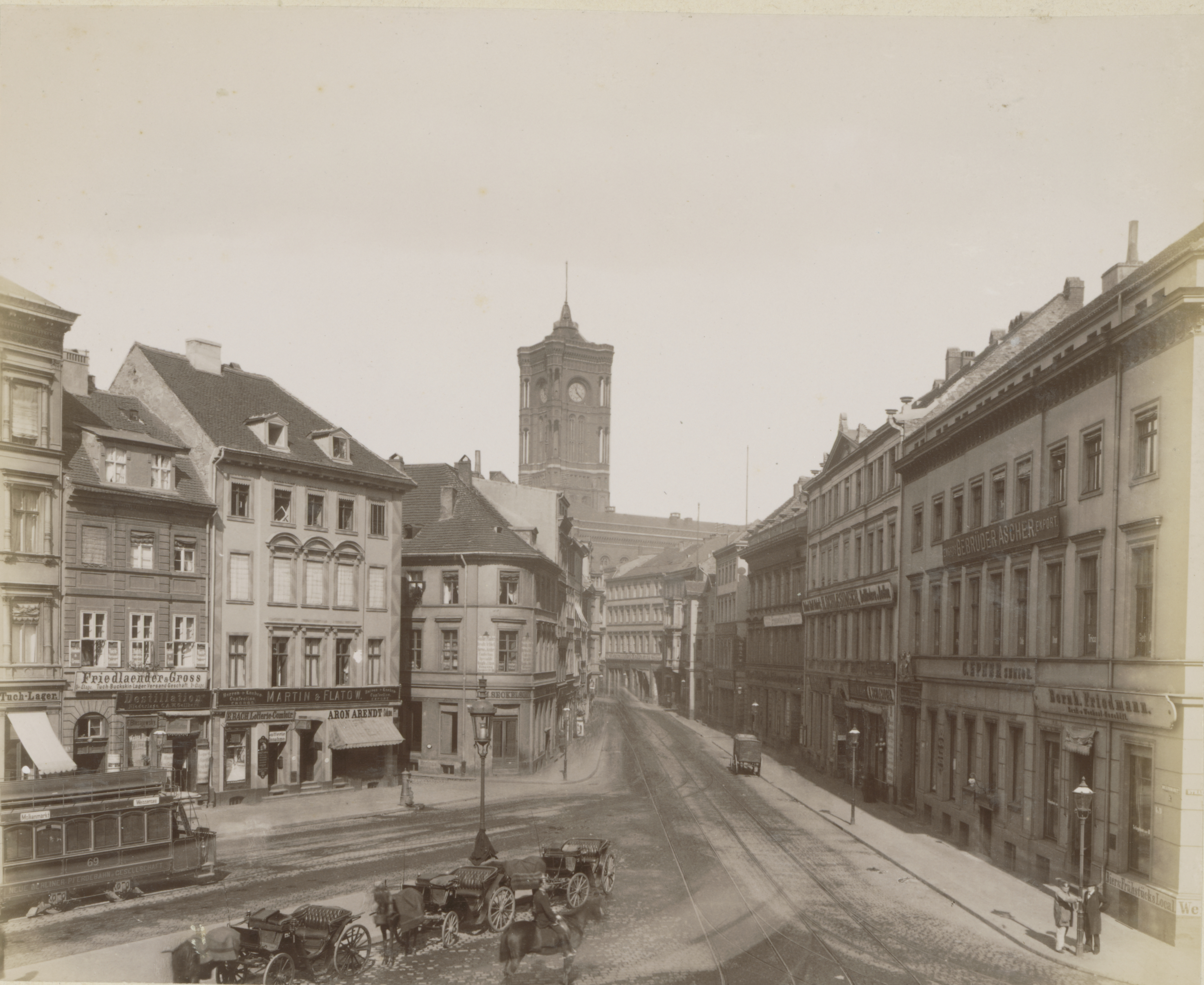
Molkenmarkt, ca. 1890

Molkenmarkt (literally: "whey market") is the oldest square in Berlin. It is located in the Alt-Berlin quarter of the Mitte district, in the historic centre of the city. With approximately 9,200 square metres (11,000 sq yd) in size, it is today a major traffic junction, dominated by the large Altes Stadthaus administrative building on its southeastern side.

== History ==
During the initial settlement around the Mühlendamm causeway across the Spree river about 1200 AD, the site developed as the central trading place. In the late 13th century, however, the venue became too small and a new marketplace beneath St. Mary's Church arose, which soon became more popular. The former site was thereafter known as Olde Markt or Alter Markt (Old Market) until 1685, when it was renamed to Mulkenmarkt, later to change to Molkenmarkt, possibly named after dairy products sold here or after nearby watermills on the Spree river. In the late 17th century, the trading place was finally closed by order of Elector Frederick III of Brandenburg. The area around the square was densely populated until World War II, when much of Berlin's city centre was destroyed by strategic bombing. In addition, the Nazi authorities had cleared many buildings in preparation of their Welthauptstadt Germania plans, with the intention of creating an administrative Gauforum around the Altes Stadthaus, which was originally separated from the square by several residential buildings along Jüdenstraße. In 1959, under the East German rule, the broad Grunerstraße was relocated, running through the square to Alexanderplatz.

Recent urban plans developed by the Senate of Berlin envisage a complete redesign of the location according to its historic condition, including narrower streets and new built-up areas on the available spaces.

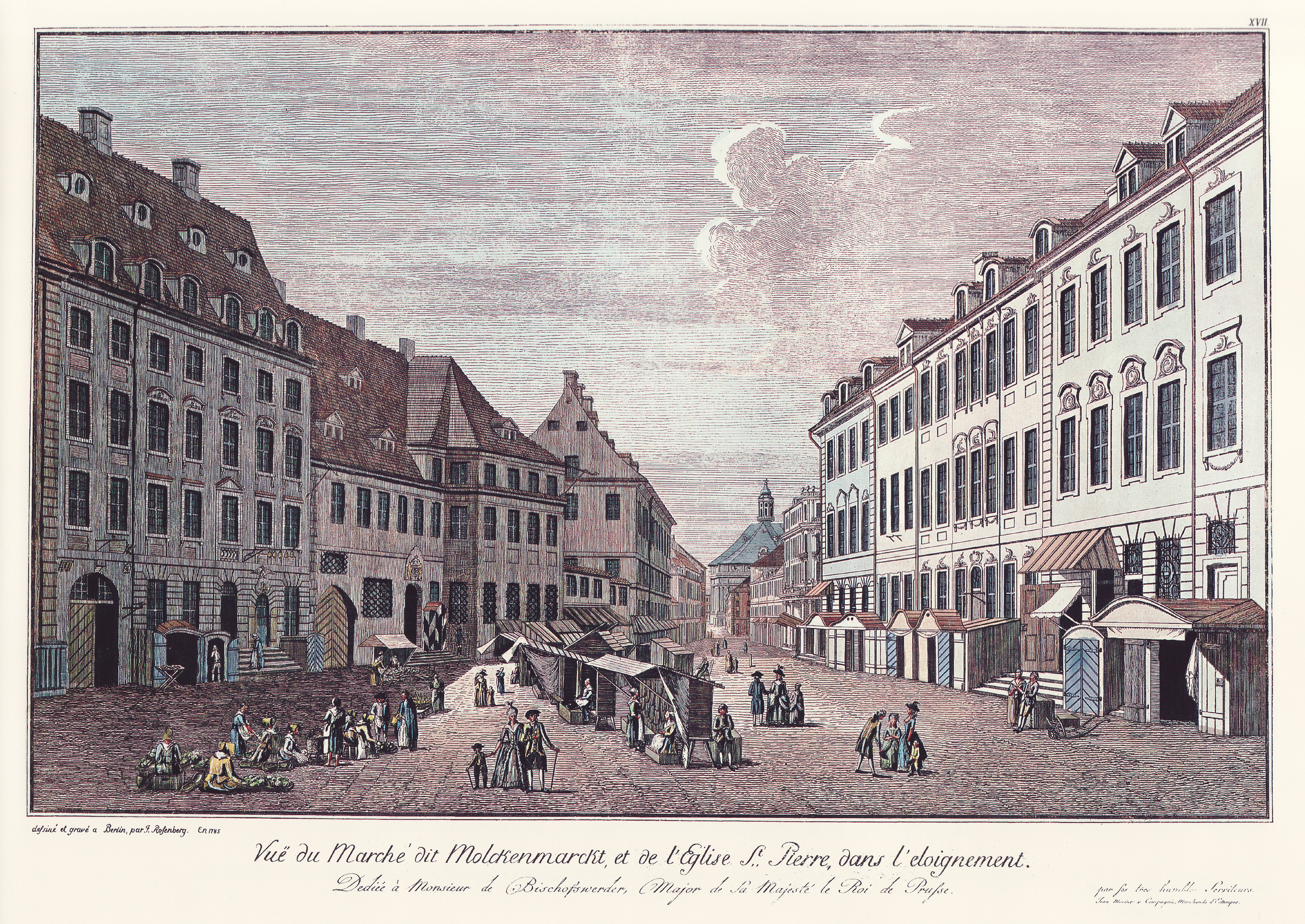
Molkenmarkt, about 1785

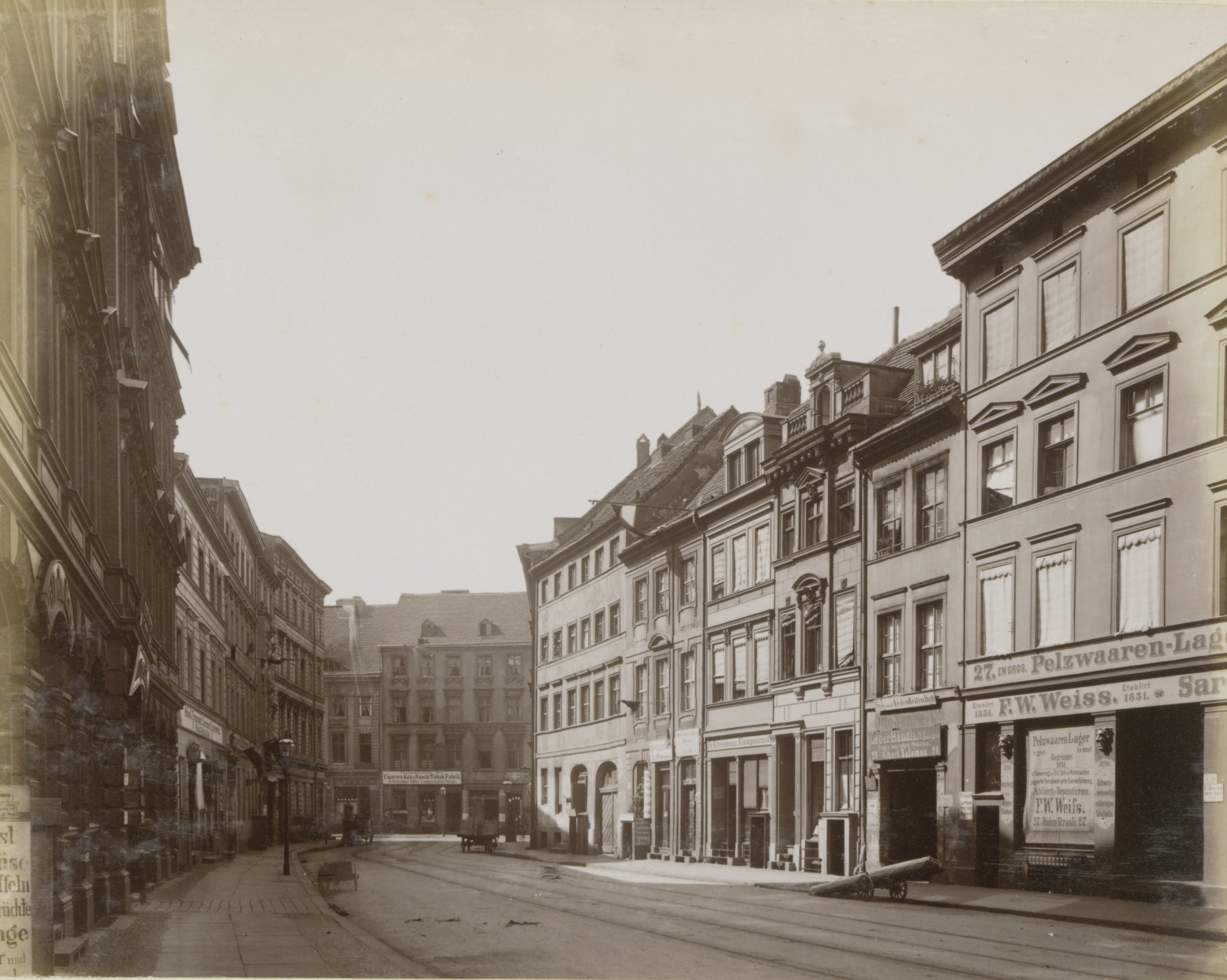
Jüdenstraße, ca. 1890

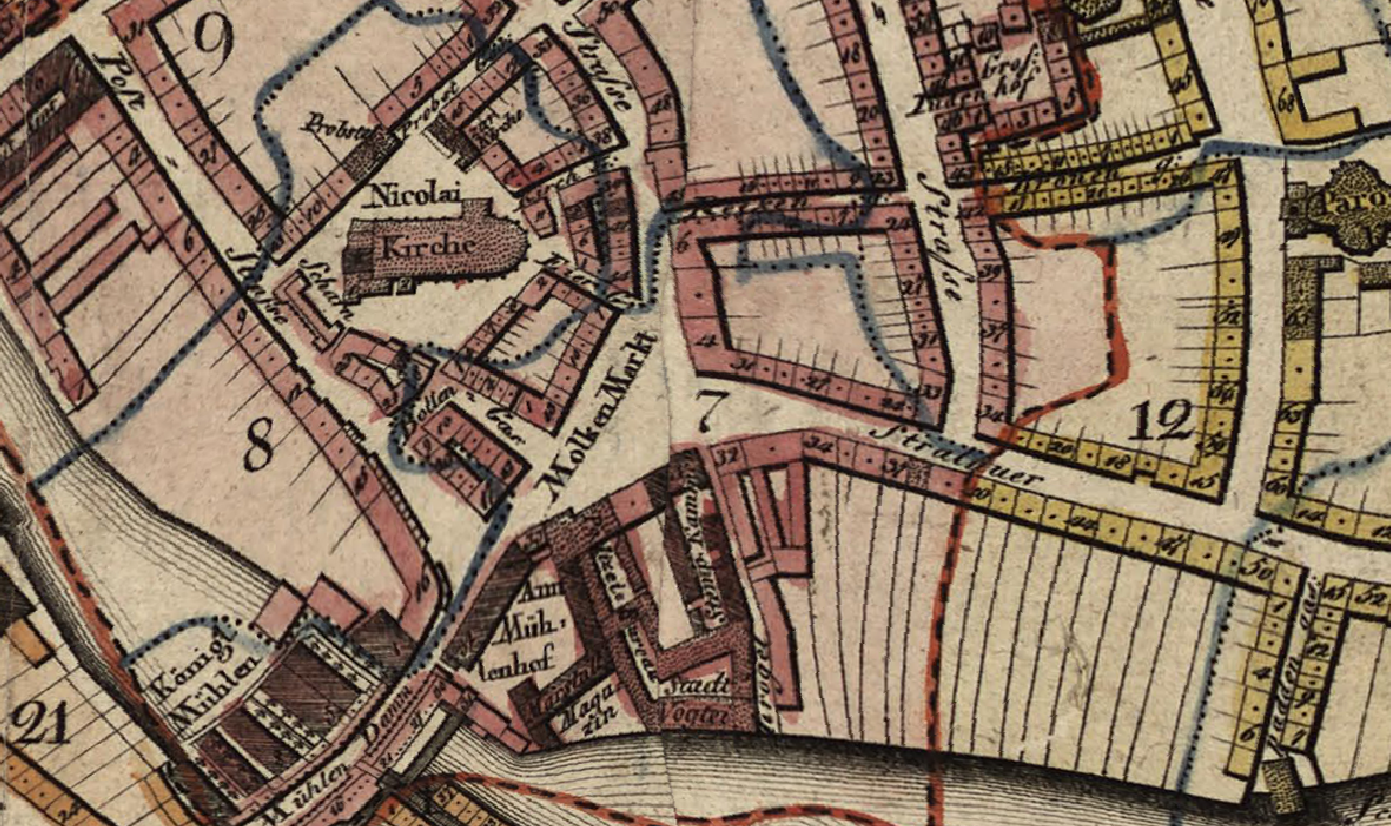
Map with Molkenmarkt, Nikolaiviertel and Parochialkirche, 1811

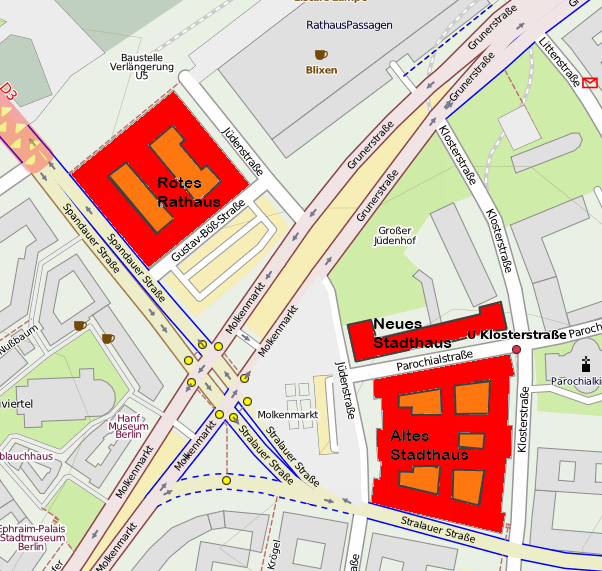
Map with Molkenmarkt and Jüdenstraße, 2012

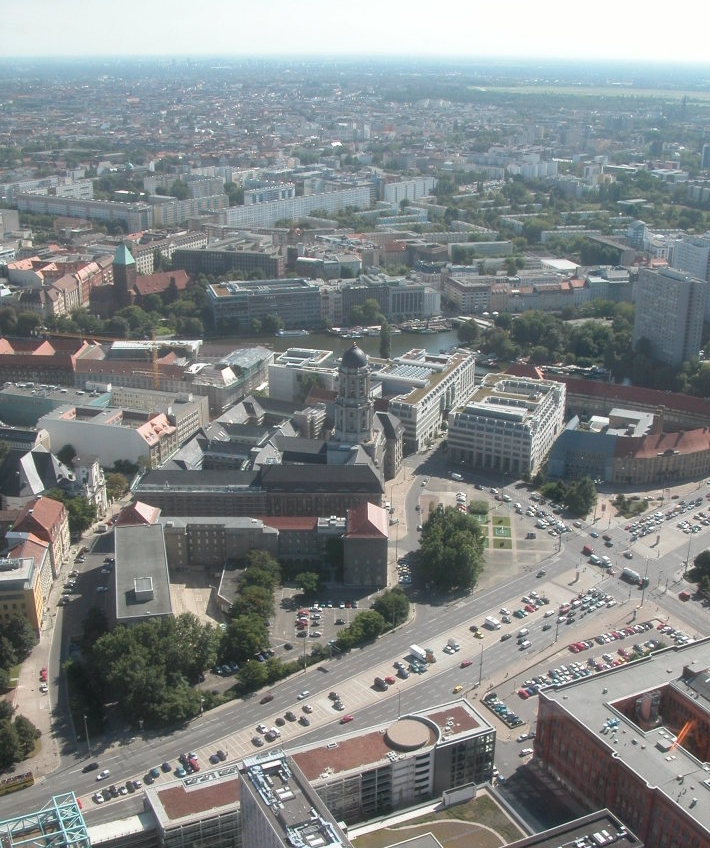
Aerial view with Molkenmarkt and Jüdenstraße, 2005
