= Mühlendamm =

Street in Berlin, Germany

Coordinates: 52°30′55″N 13°24′25″E

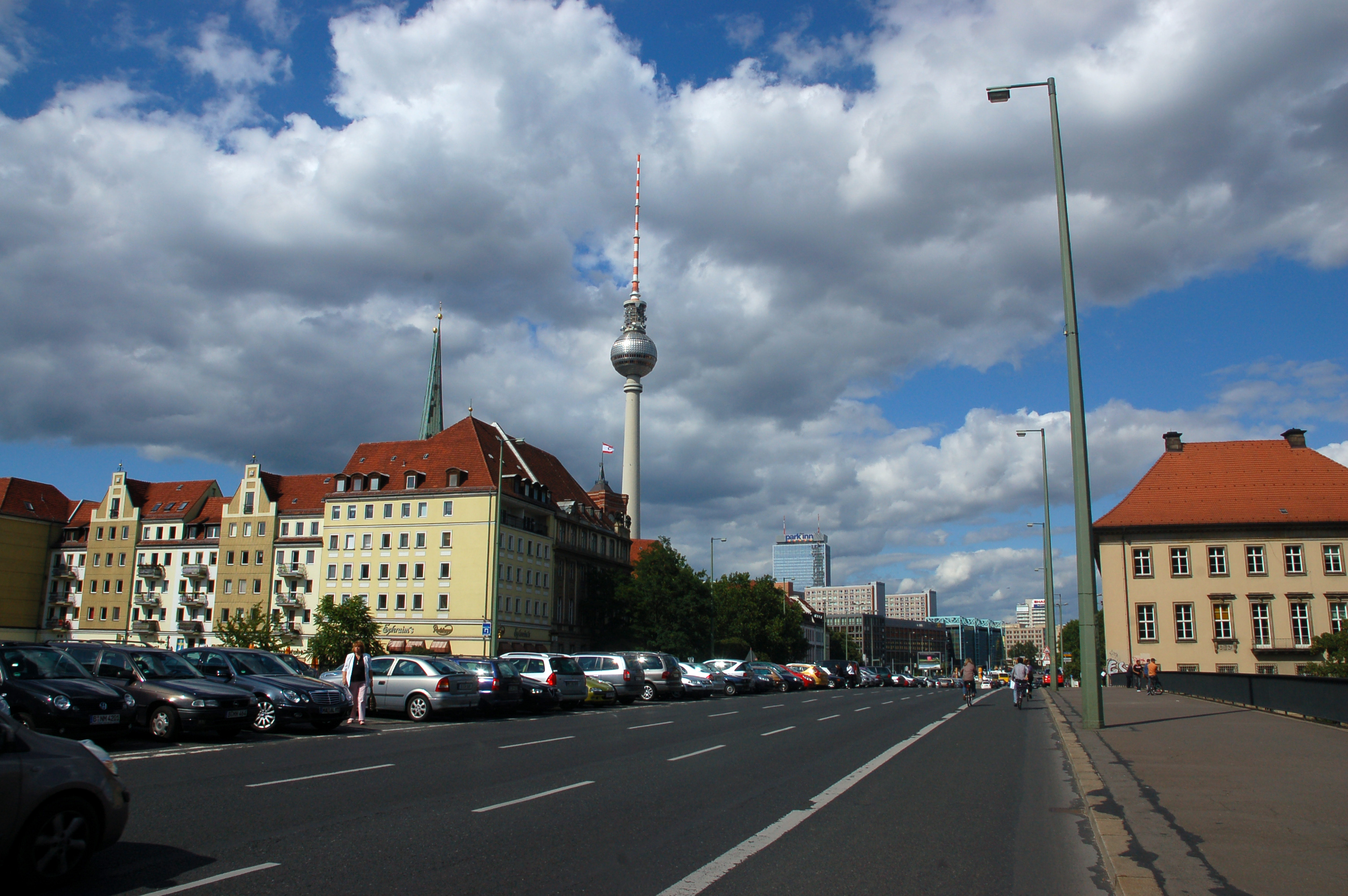
Mühlendamm road

Mühlendamm (Mill Dam) is a major thoroughfare in the central Mitte district of Berlin, Germany. It runs from the historic Cölln and Fischerinsel quarters to the Molkenmarkt square of Alt-Berlin via the Mühlendammbrücke (Mill Dam Bridge) crossing the Spree river. Named after several watermills at the site, a historic causeway was first laid out at this location about 1200 and became the nucleus of the late medieval city foundation. The current prestressed concrete bridge was built in 1968. It is part of an east–west road link to Berlin's city centre and the Bundesstraße 1 highway.

== Location ==
The bridge links Gertraudenstraße, Spittelmarkt and Leipziger Straße in the southwest with the Alexanderplatz area in the northeast. It thereby is part of the main east–west road connection in Berlin's historic city centre, beside the parallel route of Unter den Linden, Schloßplatz and Karl-Liebknecht-Straße in the north. East of the bridge is a large lockage, called Mühlendammschleuse, part of the Spree-Oder waterway.

== History ==
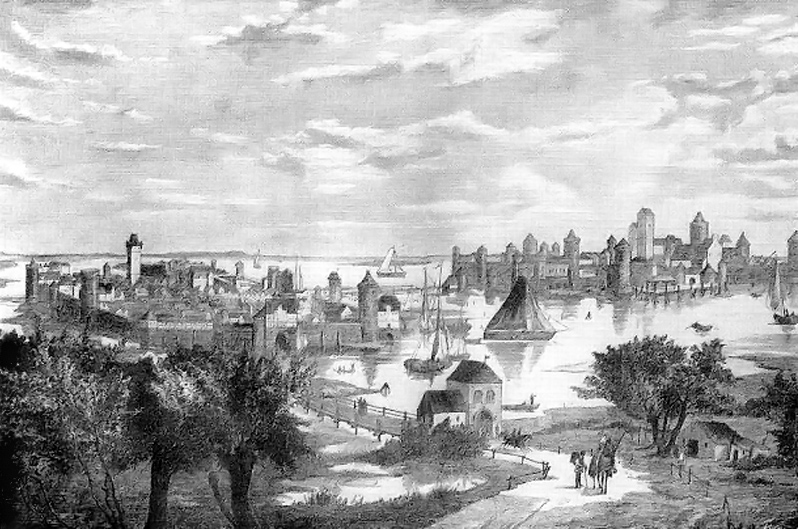
Artist's impression of the medieval twin city of Cölln (left) and Alt-Berlin, linked by the Mühlendamm (19th century)

The earliest river crossing was as a ford on the medieval Via Imperii trade route, leading from the Teltow region in the southwest (in the direction of Halle and Wittenberg) to the Barnim Plateau in the northeast (in the direction of Oderberg and Stettin), crossing the river Spree at a shallow spot in the Berlin Urstromtal. Built by German settlers after the Margraviate of Brandenburg was established in 1157, this new passage competed with existing river crossings at Spandau and Köpenick. At the ford an embankment dam and a weir were built to generate water power for grain and saw mills. Mentioned as Molendam, it was the key This was a decisive step in the development of the Cölln and Alt-Berlin villages on the two banks of the Spree river, soon followed by a second passage at the present-day Rathaus Bridge.

When Berlin-Cölln became the residence of the Brandenburg prince-electors in the 15th century, defenses were laid out at the site. The first lock was built in 1578, enabling frequent changes in the crossing of the Spree, and the citizens were vested with staple rights. The associated sales area was rebuilt under the rule of the "Great Elector" Frederick William of Brandenburg in 1687 according to plans designed by Johann Arnold Nering; called Mühlenkolonnaden, they functioned as a stock exchange until 1739. After several fires, buildings in the early 19th century were erected with sandstone colonnades and the street became a bustling commercial corridor. In 1888, a newly built 110 metres (360 ft) long lockage replaced the former structures dating from the Middle Ages. The Spree river bed was deepened, and the Mühlendamm Bridge rebuilt. The mills and related buildings were demolished in 1892.

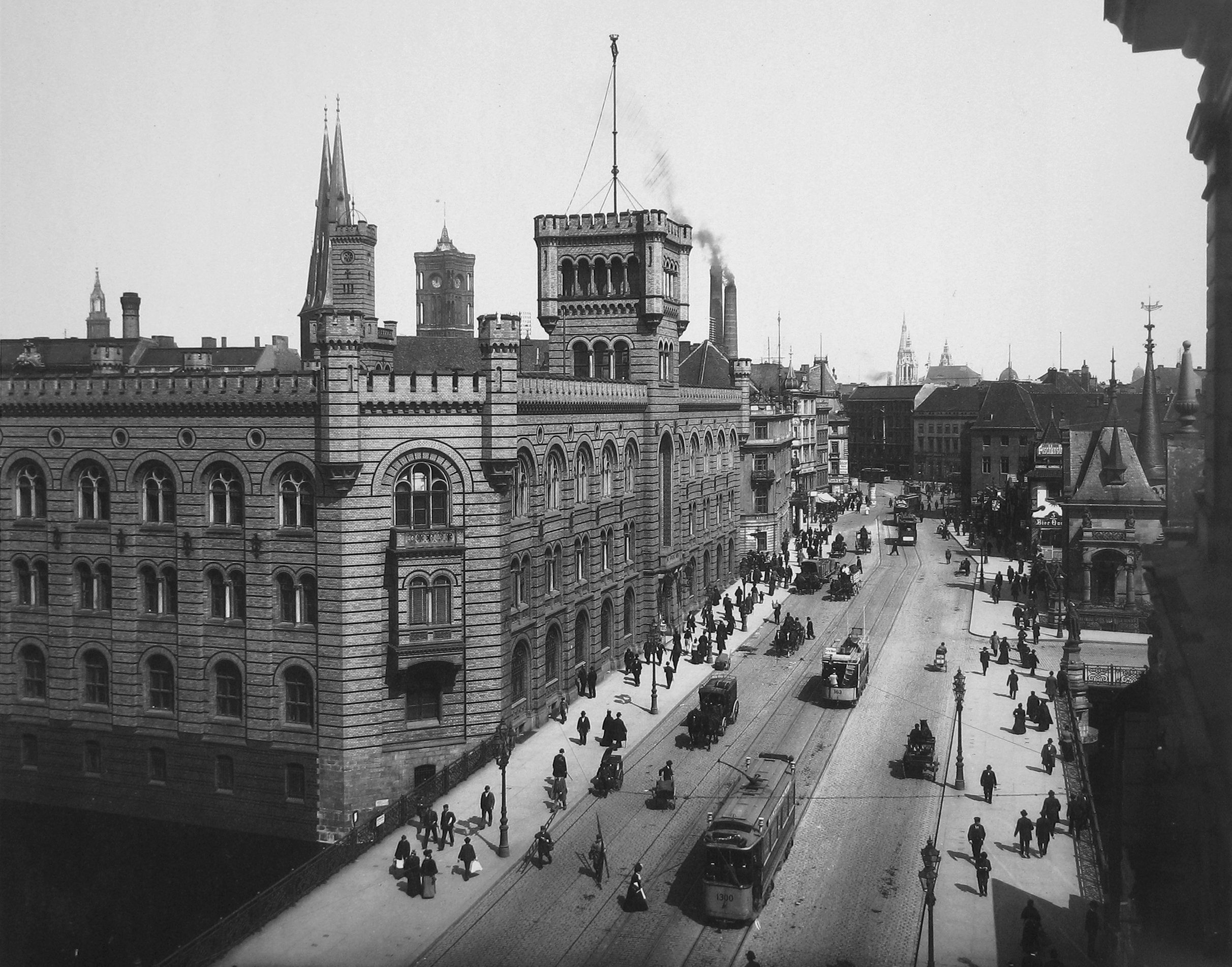
Savings bank building (Sparkassengebäude), also known as Mühlendammgebäude, 1902

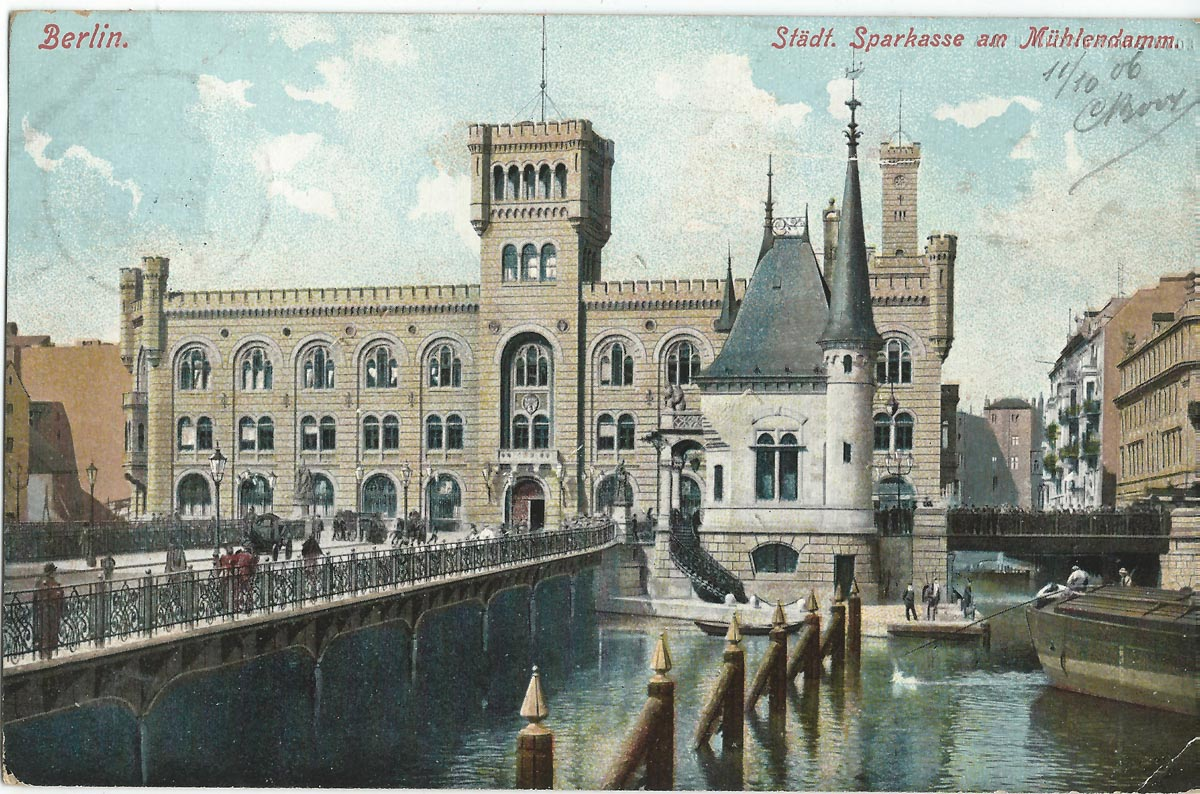
The Mühlendammgebäude at Mühlendamm on a postcard, ca. 1906

A former grain mill, erected in 1850 in a castle-like style from red and yellow bricks with towers and battlements (Mühlendammgebäude), was rebuilt as the seat of a municipal savings bank (Sparkasse). Berliners called this the "Norman Castle," a name derived from a previously existing fort. The Swiss poet Gottfried Keller, residing in Berlin between 1850 and 1855, wrote about the building in his poem, "Mühlenromantik:"

"But in Berlin, in the aroused aesthetic I saw brand new and in the best execution by the state-architect a massive Norman Festival. And it was a Flour-mill high and glorious, with battlements and towers Forming and roaring under the bridge The Berliners see the Spree storming"

The city leaders proposed a bridge as a viable steel structures. More bridges had to be constructed to cross over the channel and the lock chamber. The bridge was 15 meters wide with 8.5 meters of sidewalks, and the retention of the pedestrian bridge was 4.5 meters wide.

Between 1936 and 1940, the Mühlendamm was again redesigned, and the building and the defense disappeared envisioning a wider street. This included demolishing the Ephraim-Palais, considered "Berlin's finest corner." The outbreak of war prevented the completion of the renovations, which included two eleven-feet wide and 35-feet long steel trusses on both sides of the lock. In the last days of the war, the bridges were blown up by the Wehrmacht.

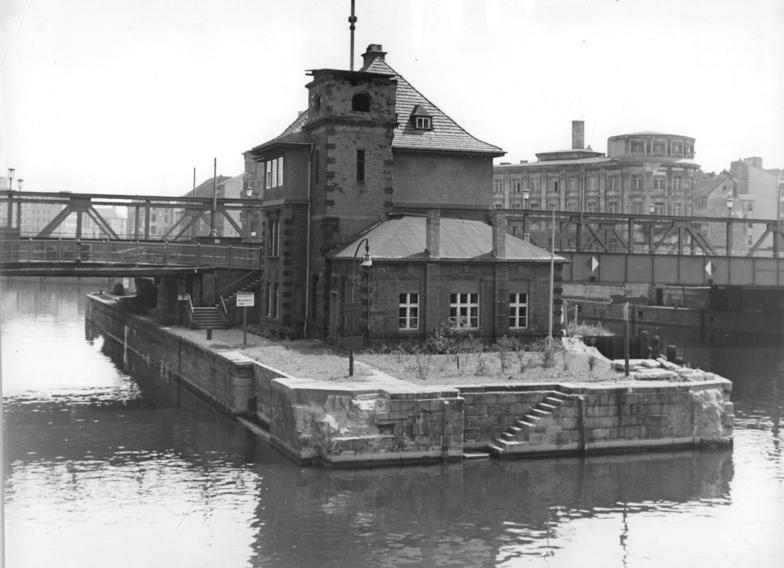
temporary bridge from 1946, photo 1956

A temporary bridge was erected in 1946, and a provisional structure was restored using steel salvaged from the river. This bridge opened to traffic on September 1, 1946. In the 1960s, construction of a modern bridge was planned. The bridge was the largest East German road bridge at the time of its completion.

In preparation for the 750th anniversary of the city of Berlin in 1985, the rococo Ephraim-Palais was reconstructed twelve meters from its original location. For this, parts of the facade, which had been stored in West-Berlin, were delivered to East Berlin in 1982 to support the reconstruction.

== Points of Interest ==
- Altes Stadthaus
- Neues Stadthaus
- Palais Schwerin
- Molkenmarkt
- Nikolaiviertel
- Gasthaus "Zur Rippe"
