= Jüdenstraße =

Street in central Berlin, Germany

- Juedenstrasse
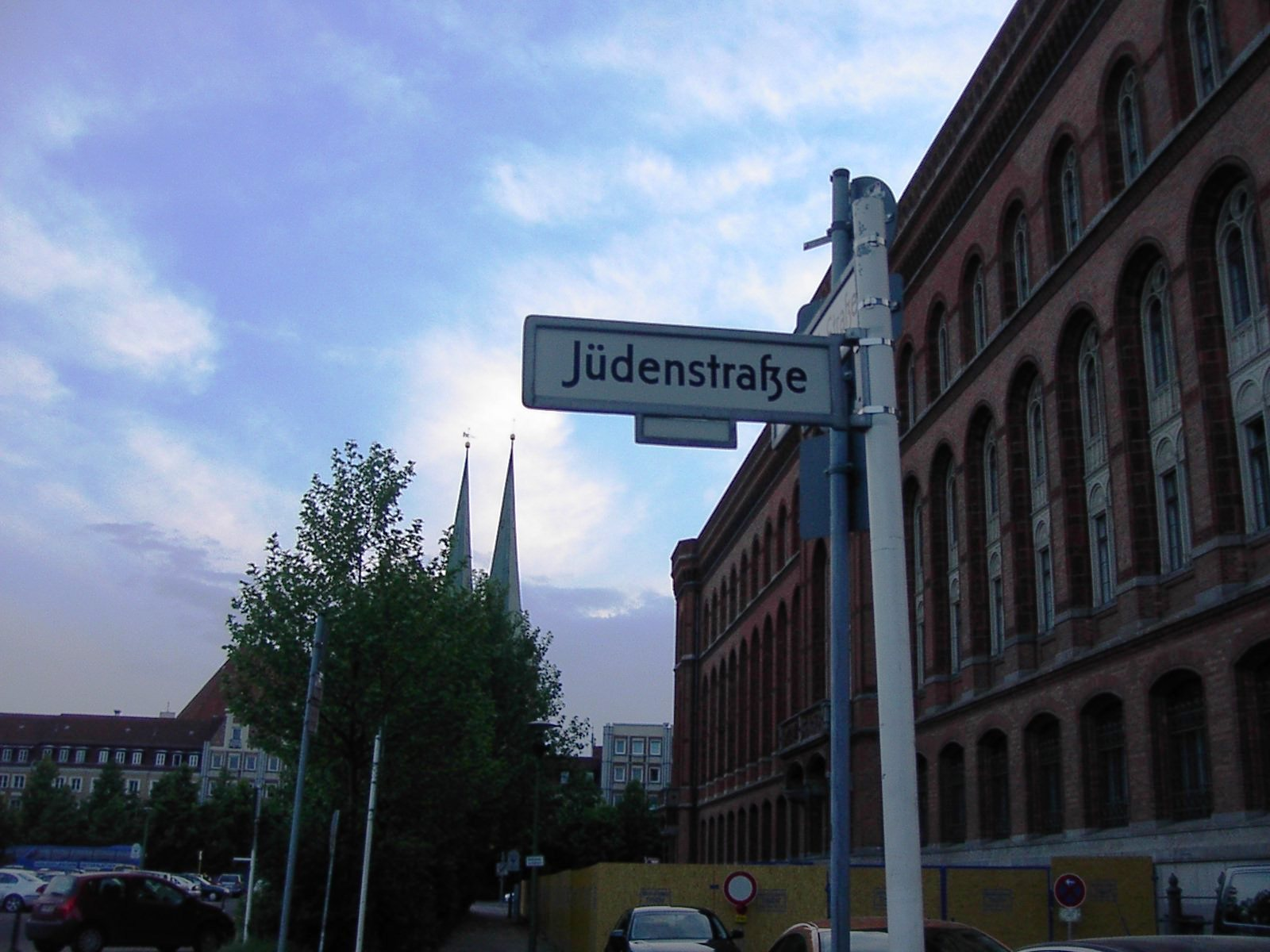
- The Rotes Rathaus (right), on the corner of Jüdenstraße
- Interactive map of Jüdenstraße
- Namesake: Jews
- Type: Street
- Location: Berlin, Germany
- Quarter: Mitte
- Nearest metro station: Klosterstraße
- Coordinates: 52°31′00″N 13°24′38″E
- South end: Neue Jüdenstraße; Stralauer Straße; Molkenmarkt
- Major junctions: Parochialstraße; Grunerstraße
- North end: Rathausstraße

Jüdenstraße, or Juedenstrasse (see ß; transl. Street of the Jews), is a street in central Berlin, the capital of Germany. It is in the borough of Mitte and runs between Rathausstraße and Stralauer Straße, next to the Rotes Rathaus, Berlin's town hall. It is one of the oldest streets in Berlin, dating from the late 13th century.

Its name preserves the old East Central German expression for Jews, which was Jüden, instead of New High German Juden. The Yiddish term for Jews «יידן» (transliterated: Yidn) is based on the same German dialect form, with the German umlaut ü being represented by a «י» (here pronounced [ɪ]). As the name of the street suggests, it once ran through the Jewish district of medieval Berlin, which was no ghetto-like obligatory residential area for Jews. An alley of Jüdenstraße named Großer Jüdenhof was the site of the synagogue, school and mikveh. They were founded on an estate of the Margrave of Brandenburg within his immunity district (landesherrliche Freiheit) not under Berlin's city council jurisdiction. Many Jews preferred to live close to these congregational institutions, until Elector Joachim I Nestor expelled the Jews from Brandenburg in 1510.

Horst Wessel lived there in his youth.

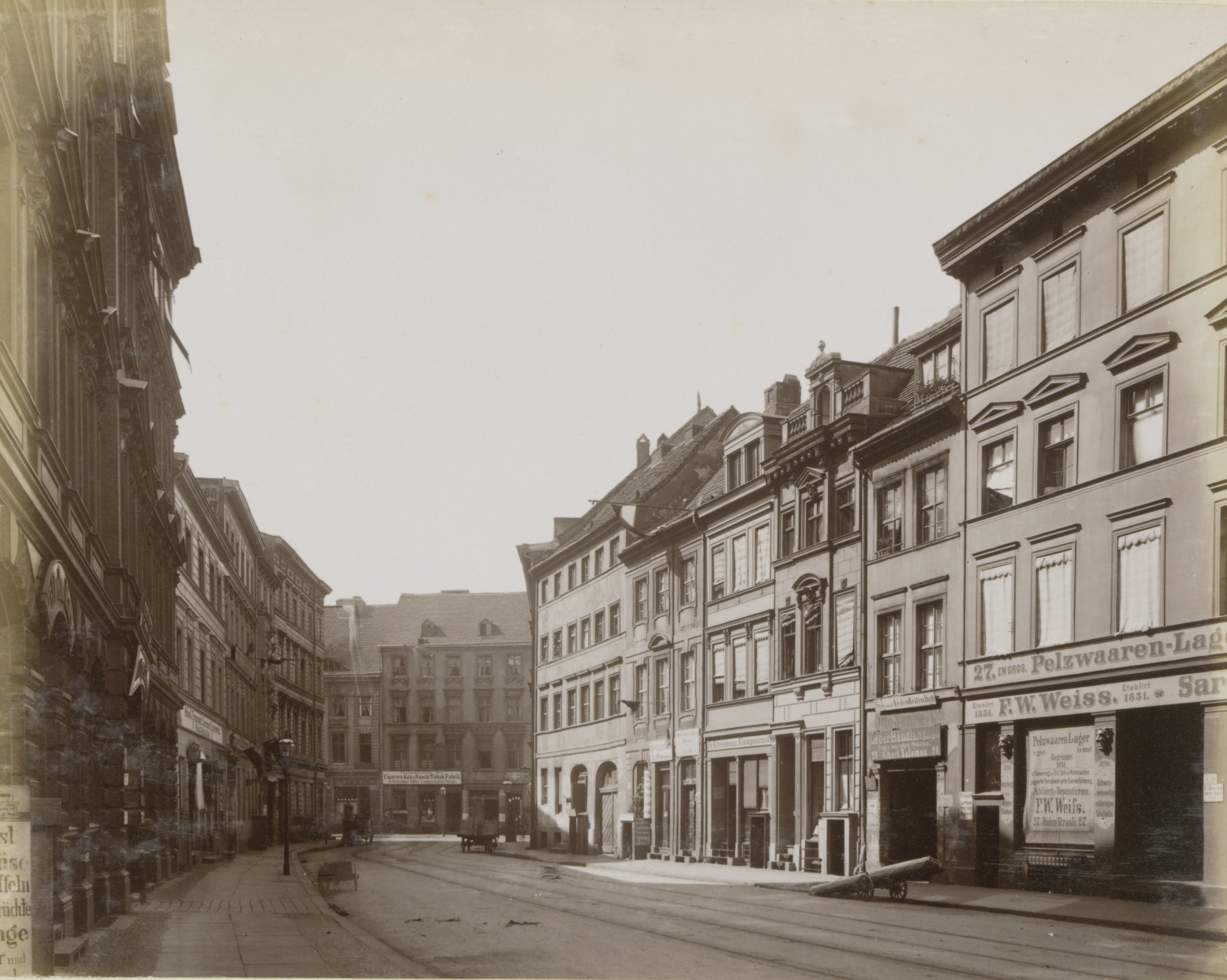
Jüdenstraße, ca. 1890

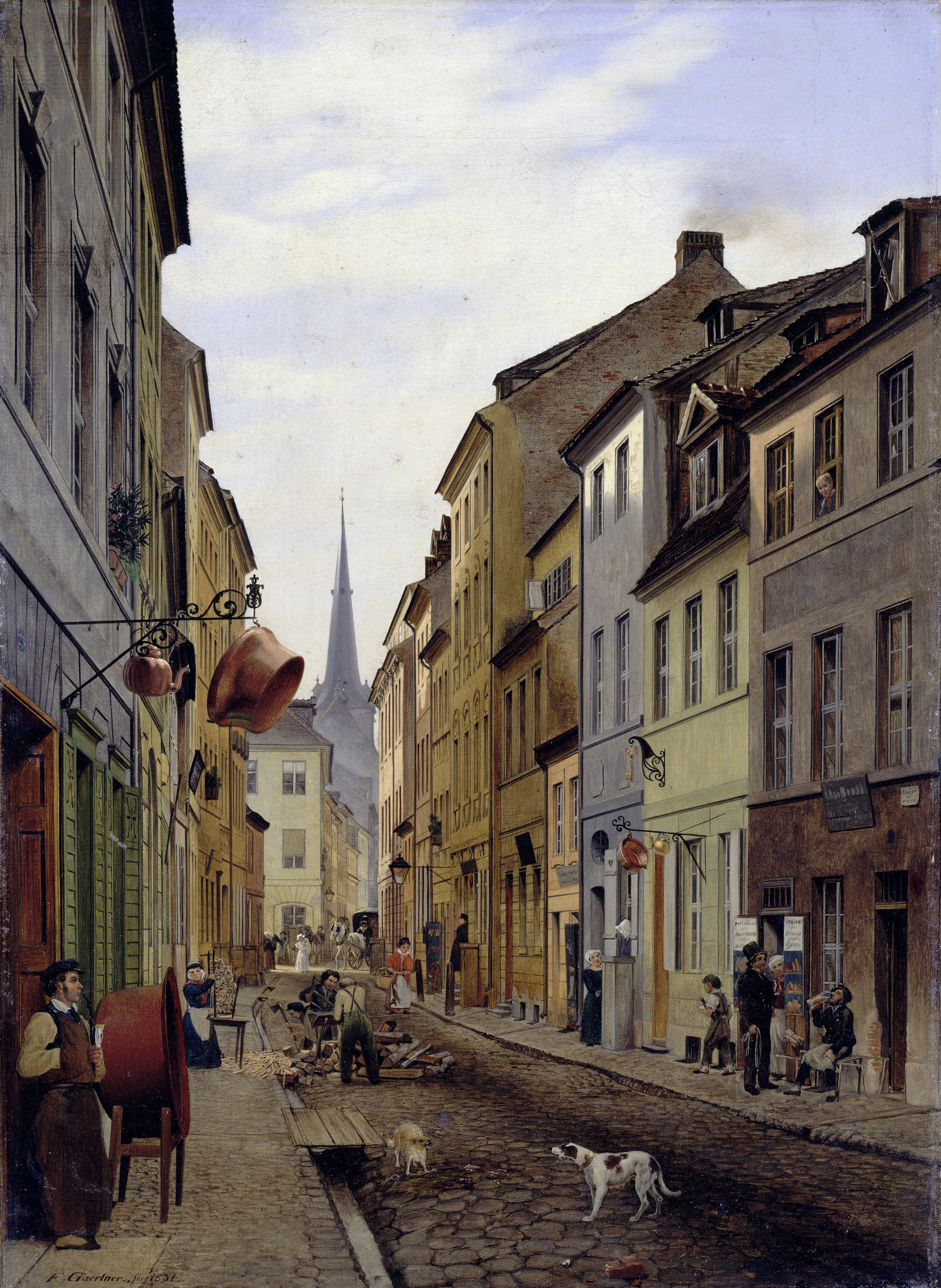
Parochialstraße with the crossing with Jüdenstraße, Parochialstrasse in Berlin, Eduard Gaertner, 1831

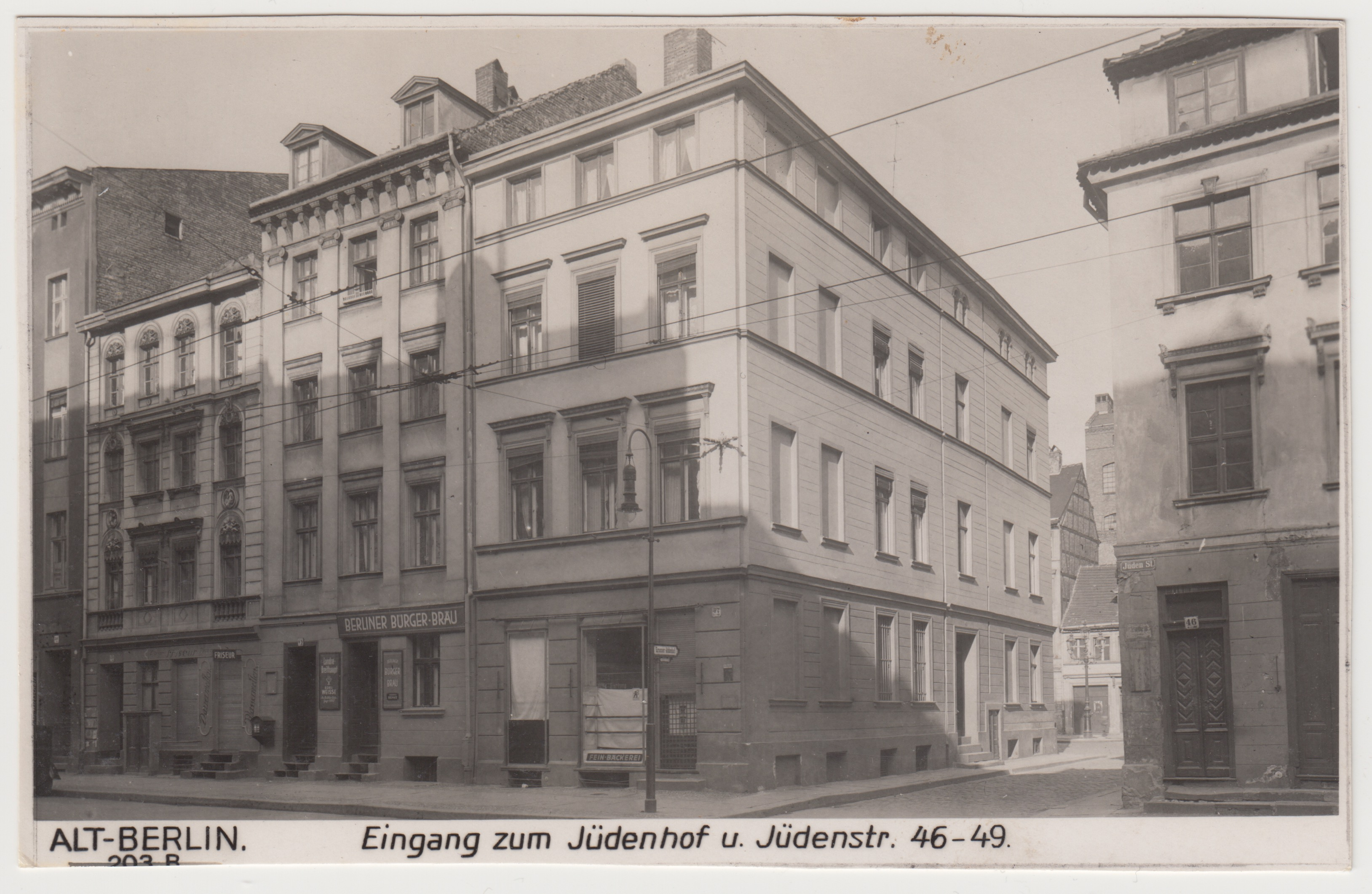
Jüdenstraße with the entrance to the Großer Jüdenhof, ca. 1930

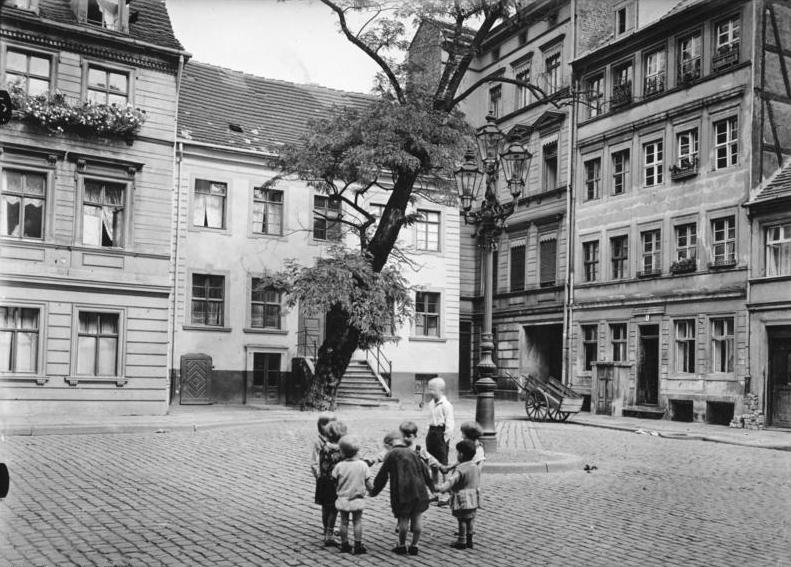
Großer Jüdenhof, 1930

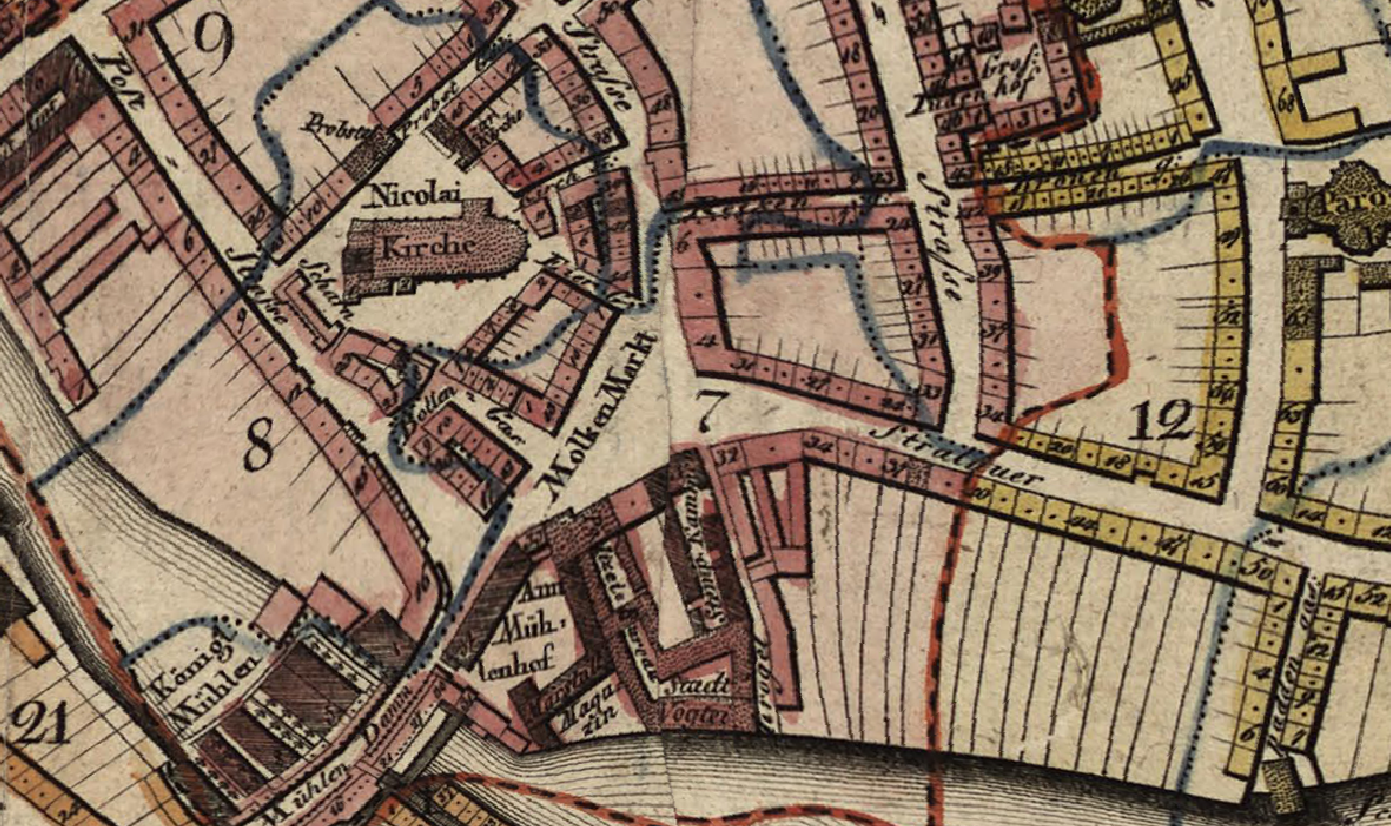
Map with "Groß. Jüdenhof", Molkenmarkt, Nikolaiviertel and Parochialkirche, 1811

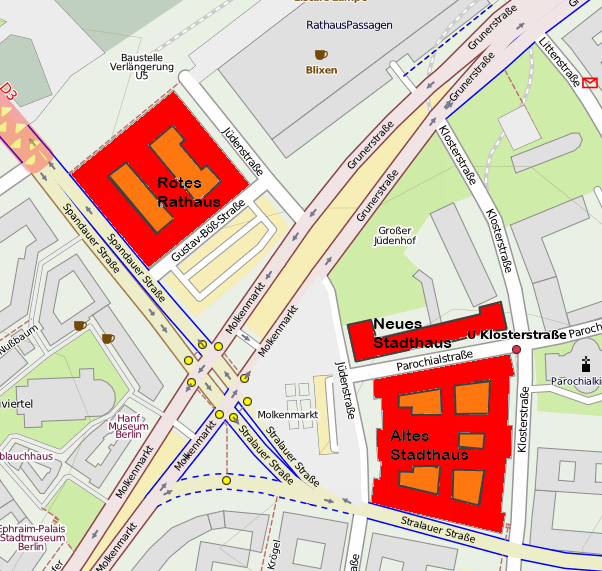
Map with Jüdenstraße, 2012

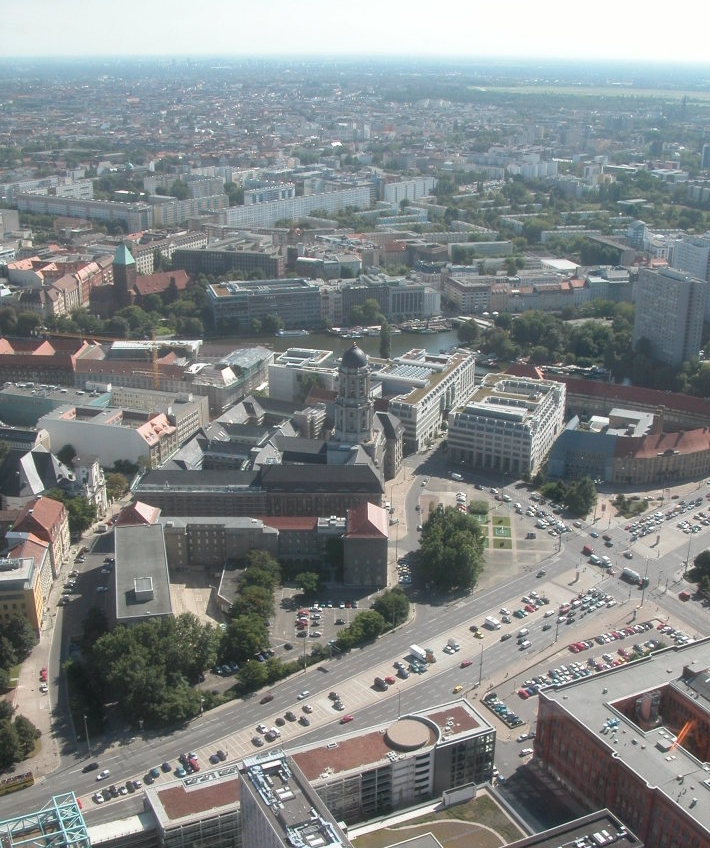
Aerial view of Jüdenstraße and Molkenmarkt, 2005

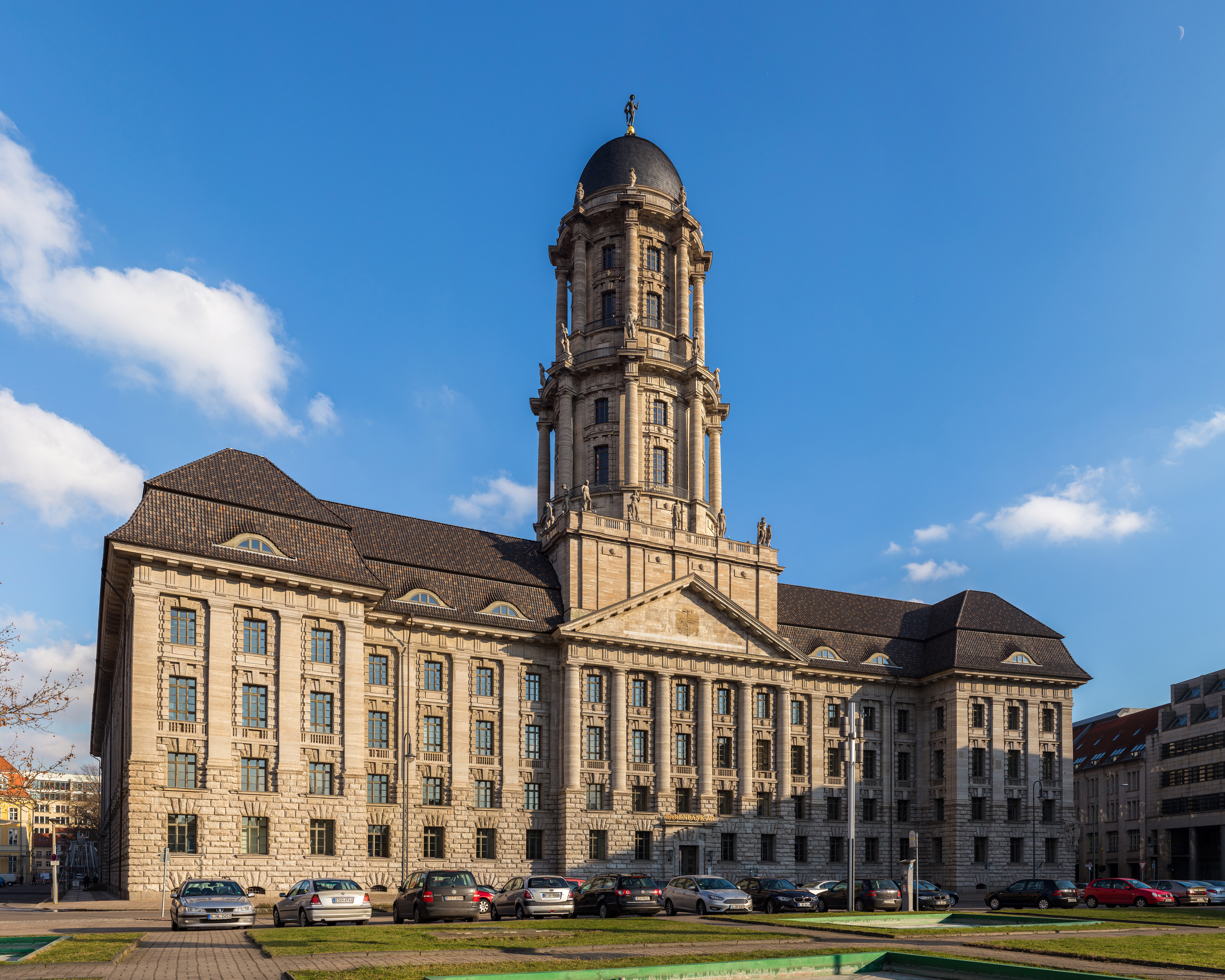
Altes Stadthaus in Jüdenstraße

== See also ==
- Judengasse
