= Carl Wahlbom =

Swedish painter, illustrator and sculptor

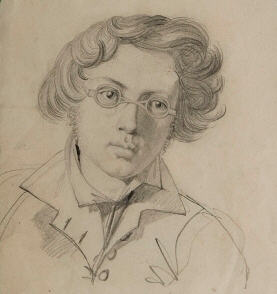
Self-portrait (1830)

Johan Wilhelm Carl Wahlbom (16 October 1810 – 25 April 1858) was a Swedish painter, illustrator and sculptor.

== Biography ==
His father, Adolf, was a pastor and professor and his grandfather, Johan Gustaf Wahlbom, was a noted doctor and scientist who studied with Carl Linnaeus. In 1824, at the age of fourteen, he became a cadet at the Military Academy Karlberg. While there, his primary interests were gymnastics and fencing. The methods of Per Henrik Ling, a pioneer of physical education, had a great influence on his personal development. In his letters, he also expressed interest in literary and artistic endeavors and made illustrations for a student publication called Kornblixten (heat lightning).

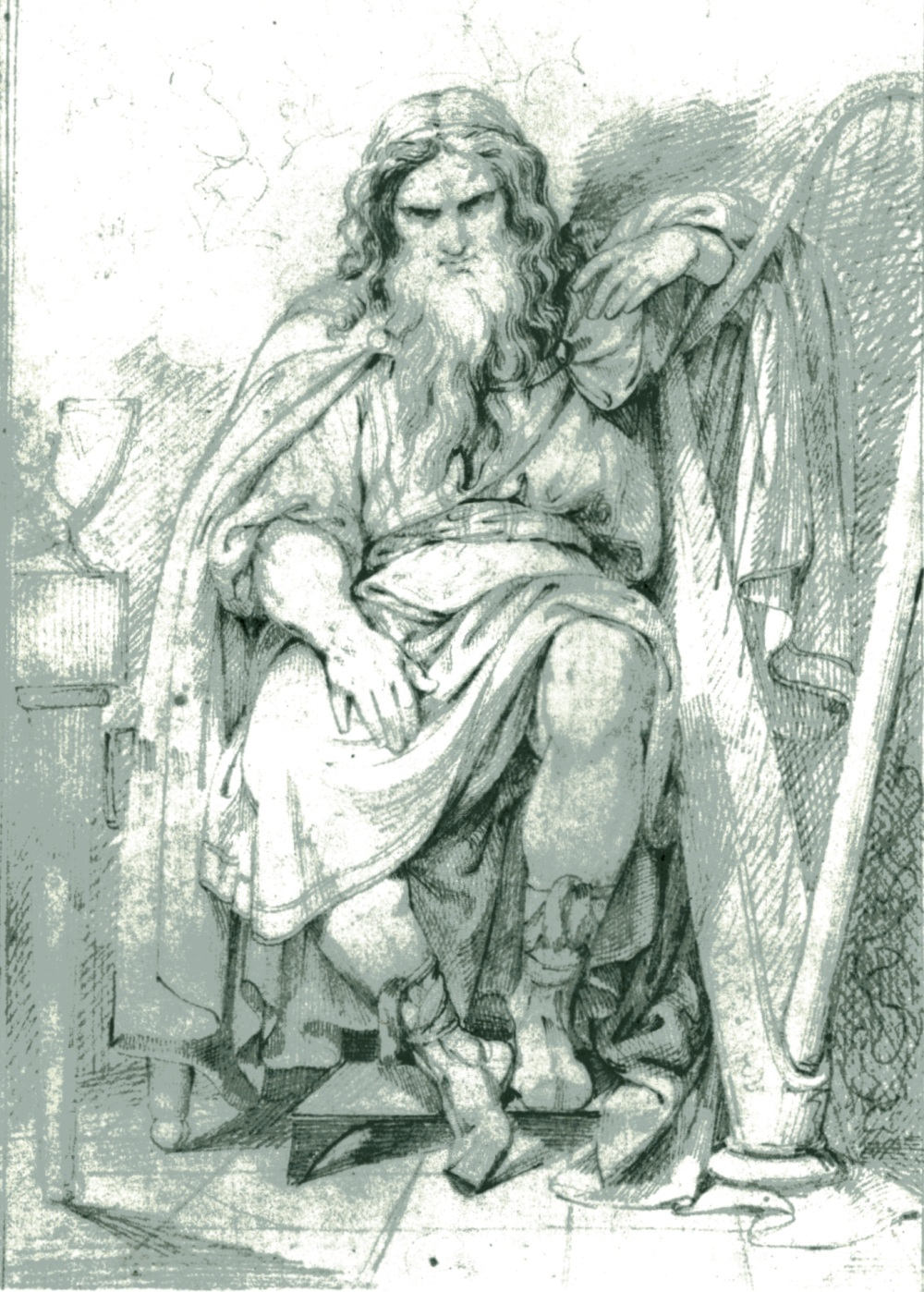
Bragi with his Harp

After his father died in 1828, he was forced to find employment as a teacher at the Royal Central Gymnastics Institute, which provided housing. It was there that he first met Ling. He was also exposed to the drawings of Fredric Westin, with whom he began to study that same year. In 1829, after leaving military service, he was able to enroll at the Royal Swedish Academy of Fine Arts. During this time, he also received support from Fredrik Boije, the publisher of an artistic journal. Boije also taught him etching. He later produced lithographs, including a series of twenty-four historical scenes with text by Karl August Nicander. He also did illustrations for Fritiof by Esaias Tegnér. His preoccupation with graphic work made Westin remark that he was not developing a good sense of color. In response, he focused on watercolor techniques.

Despite Boije's support and living with Westin, he found himself in financial difficulties and had to quit the Royal Academy in 1833. After that, he supported himself with his illustrations and occasional work as a gym teacher, although he did take some time to study anatomy with Anders Retzius. In 1838, he was a candidate for a major scholarship, but it was awarded to Per Wickenberg. Instead, a group of friends joined and raised 700 riksdaler. With recommendations from Ling and the academy's art director, Johan Gustaf Sandberg, he was able to go on a study trip to Paris. Once there, he moved into the Hôtel de Beauvais, where he shared an apartment with Fritz von Dardel. He soon sent home several sculptures, but they found no buyers. In addition to drawing and modeling, he studied xylography.

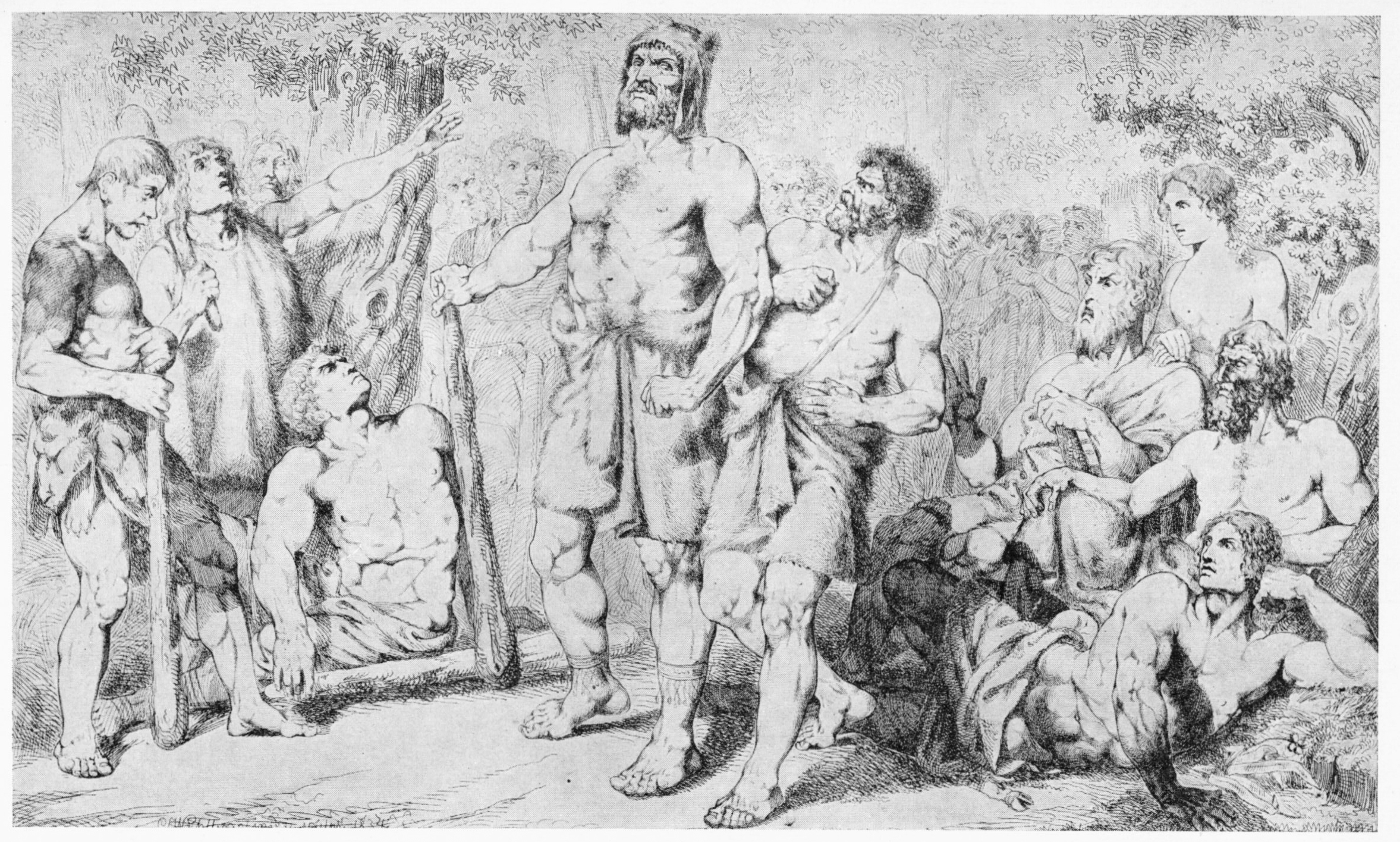
Illustration for Asarne by Per Hendrik Ling, with Storkvid (center), the father of Starkad

=== In Paris and Rome ===
Funds were scarce in Paris, and the local publishers were not interested in his drawings. Aubert et Cie. offered to give him work if he would do pictures of pretty girls. Finally, through the Swedish ministry, he made contact with Count Adolf Eugène von Rosen who was able to find him work with an English publisher who was planning a translation of Gustaf II Adolfs Historia by Anders Fryxell. Wahlbom travelled to Germany and made extensive preliminary sketches but, upon his return, was told that the publisher had gone out of business. He managed to sell his drawings to an art dealer.

He began painting in oils and, with a recommendation from Olof Johan Södermark, a military officer who was a part-time painter, he was able to receive lessons from Franz Xaver Winterhalter. Despite a glowing letter of praise from Winterhalter, another attempt to get a scholarship from the Royal Academy was a failure. However, in 1842, they named him an "agré" (a type of member candidate) and received a stipendium.

The Death of King Gustav II Adolf at the Battle of Lützen

In 1843, he decided to try his luck in Rome, where he found a position in the studios of Bengt Erland Fogelberg. A shift in his interests also took place, as he visited the Roman Campagna to paint animals and farmers. He also spent a great deal of time with his fellow Swedish artists at the Caffè Greco. In 1845, based on the work he sent home, he was awarded a two-year extension of his financial support. After another stay in Paris, he returned to Stockholm in 1848 and was elected a member of the Royal Academy. After filling in for Carl Gustaf Qvarnström, during a leave of absence, he was named a professor.

At this time, his health had begun to worsen. In 1852, upon his doctor's recommendation, he spent the winter in Brussels. The following year, he went again to Paris, but his illness prevented him from painting for long periods. An attempt to display some of his works at the Salon was not successful. Soon after, he and a friend went to Rome and he acquired a studio on the Via della Purificazione, in the art district. Once more, he was unable to paint for long periods due to attacks of gout.

=== Final years and death ===
When his mentor, Westin, left the academy, Wahlbom was named to replace him but, shortly after the appointment, he was found on the floor of a hotel room, unconscious from a stroke. He spent nine months at the Fatebenefratelli Hospital, unable to move his left side or lift his right arm. Accompanied by a nurse, he travelled to Lyon for treatment, then to London to receive an experimental electrical treatment invented by a certain M. Beckensteiner. He remained in London, a shadow of his former self, and received numerous visits from his friends. He was preparing to return to Sweden when he was diagnosed with kidney disease. In April, he died after a series of strokes and was buried at the Brookwood Cemetery in Woking.

His works may be seen at the Göteborgs konstmuseum, Nationalmuseum, Uppsala University Library, Nordiska museet and the Nasjonalgalleriet, among many others.
