= Bartmann =

Bartmann is a surname. Notable people with the surname include:

- Aina Bartmann (born 1959), Norwegian politician
- Bill Bartmann (1948–2016), American businessman
- Dominik Bartmann (born 1953), German art historian and curator
- Kim Bartmann Minneapolis restaurateur
- Wahl Bartmann (born 1963), South African rugby union player

== See also ==
- Bartmann jug
- Bartman (disambiguation)
