= Fredrik Boije =

Swedish military officer, illustrator and author

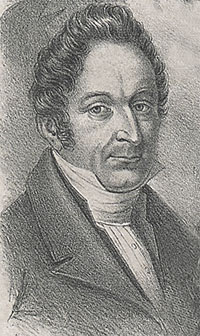
Fredrik Boije; artist unknown (1847)

Fredrik Carl Boije af Gennäs (7 July 1773, in Stralsund – 8 February 1857, in Stockholm) was a Swedish military officer, illustrator and writer.

== Biography ==
His father, Lord Fredrik Boije, Director General of the Royal Postal Agency. At the age of four, he was enrolled as a coronet with the Västergötland Cavalry Regiment. He was appointed a Lieutenant in 1789 and participated in all of the regiments campaigns. By 1815, he had achieved the rank of Lieutenant-Colonel and was appointed a Chamberlain the following year. He resigned from the service in 1820.

Eventually, he became more famous as a writer and artist. Among his books may be mentioned Riksdagshistoria från 1627–1823 med landtmarskalkarnas porträtt (Parliamentary History from 1627 to 1823 with Portraits of the Lord Marshals, 1825-27). He also published the Magasin för konst, nyheter och moder (Magazine for Art, News and Fashion), in twenty-six editions, from 1818 to 1844. It was the first fashion magazine in Sweden and one of the first few outside France. He created most of the illustrative etchings himself.

His Målare-lexikon til begagnande såsom handbok för konstidkare och taflesamlare (Painter's Lexicon for Use as Handbook for Artisans and Table Collectors, 1833) has also been very useful.

In his youth, he fell in love with Ulrika Hierta, from another noble family, who was ten years his senior. They were married when he was twenty-two. She died three years before him, at the age of ninety-one.

Many of his artistic works may be seen at the Nationalmuseum in Stockholm.

== Other selected works ==
- Samling af contur-teckningar, med en analytisk och critisk beskrifning öfver hvarje ämne (Collection of contour drawings, with an analytical and critical description of each subject), Boije & Wetterling. Stockholm, 1821-1823
- Grundlig undervisning för fruntimmer at förfärdiga alla slags arbeten i papp, til nytta eller tidsfördrif.: Med planscher (Thorough instruction for women to complete short projects with cardboard, for practical use or as a pastime; with pictures), 1830
- Prinsessans barnabok (The Princesses' Children's Book), 1835, Johan Carl Hebom, Stockholm

== Sources ==
- Biography @ the Svenskt biografiskt lexikon
- Biography from the Svenskt biografiskt handlexikon @ Projekt Runeberg
