= Eduard Gaertner =

German painter (1801–1877)

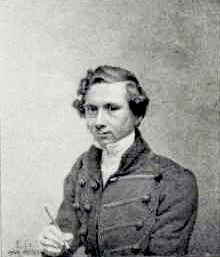
- Gaertner, self-portrait, 1829
- Born: 2 June 1801; Berlin
- Died: 22 February 1877 (aged 75); Flecken Zechlin, in Rheinsberg

Johann Philipp Eduard Gaertner (2 June 1801 – 22 February 1877) was a German painter who specialized in depictions of urban architecture.

== Early life and work ==
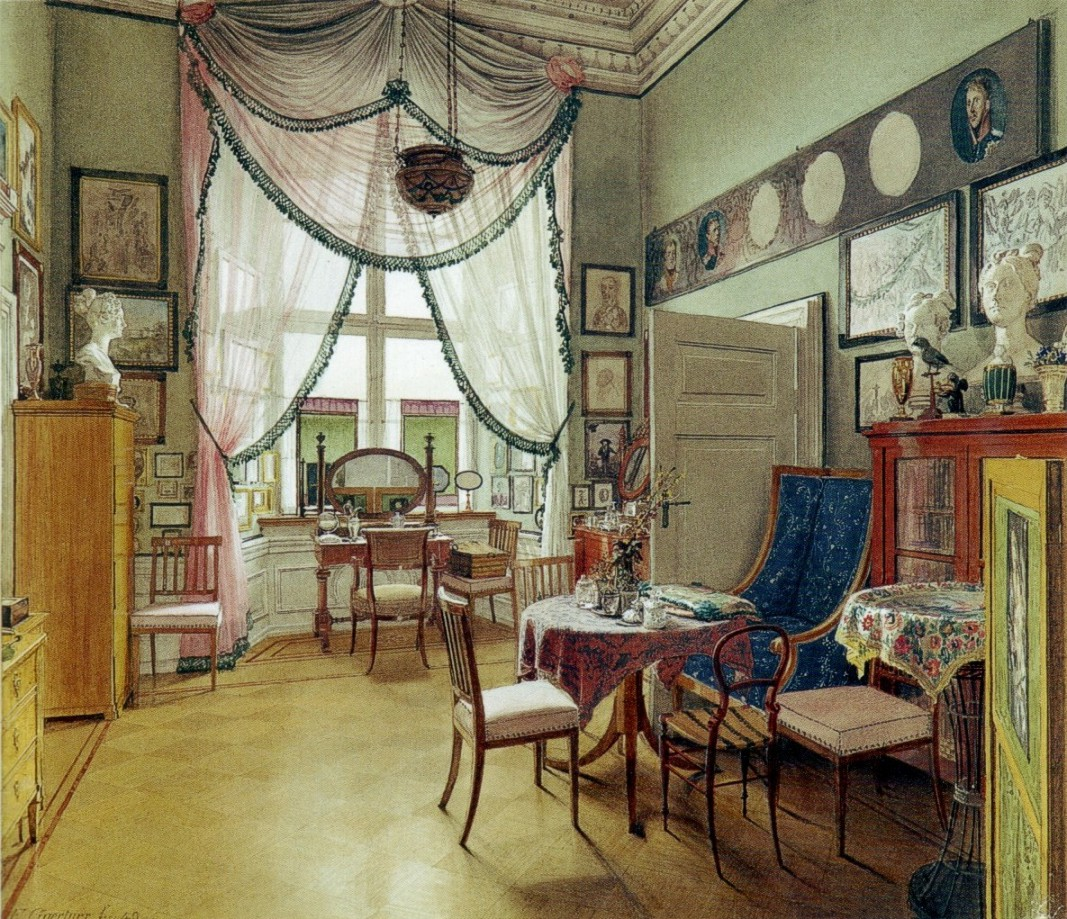
Zimmerbild 96

=== Education ===
In 1806, he moved with his mother to Kassel, where he received his first drawing lessons. They returned to Berlin in 1813 and he took up a six-year apprenticeship at the Royal Porcelain Factory. Although many artists had begun their careers at the factory, he felt that the instruction provided was superficial and took drawing classes at the Academy of Arts.

In 1821, he accepted a position as a decorative painter in the studios of Carl Wilhelm Gropius, the Royal Court Theater painter, where he remained until 1825. During this time, he became increasingly attracted to architectural painting. He was able to finance a study trip to Paris by selling a portrait of King Friedrich Wilhelm III of Prussia to the royal family. While there, he acquired more skill in the manipulation of light and atmosphere, and was inspired by the magnificent vistas of medieval buildings to devote himself almost entirely to painting vedute.

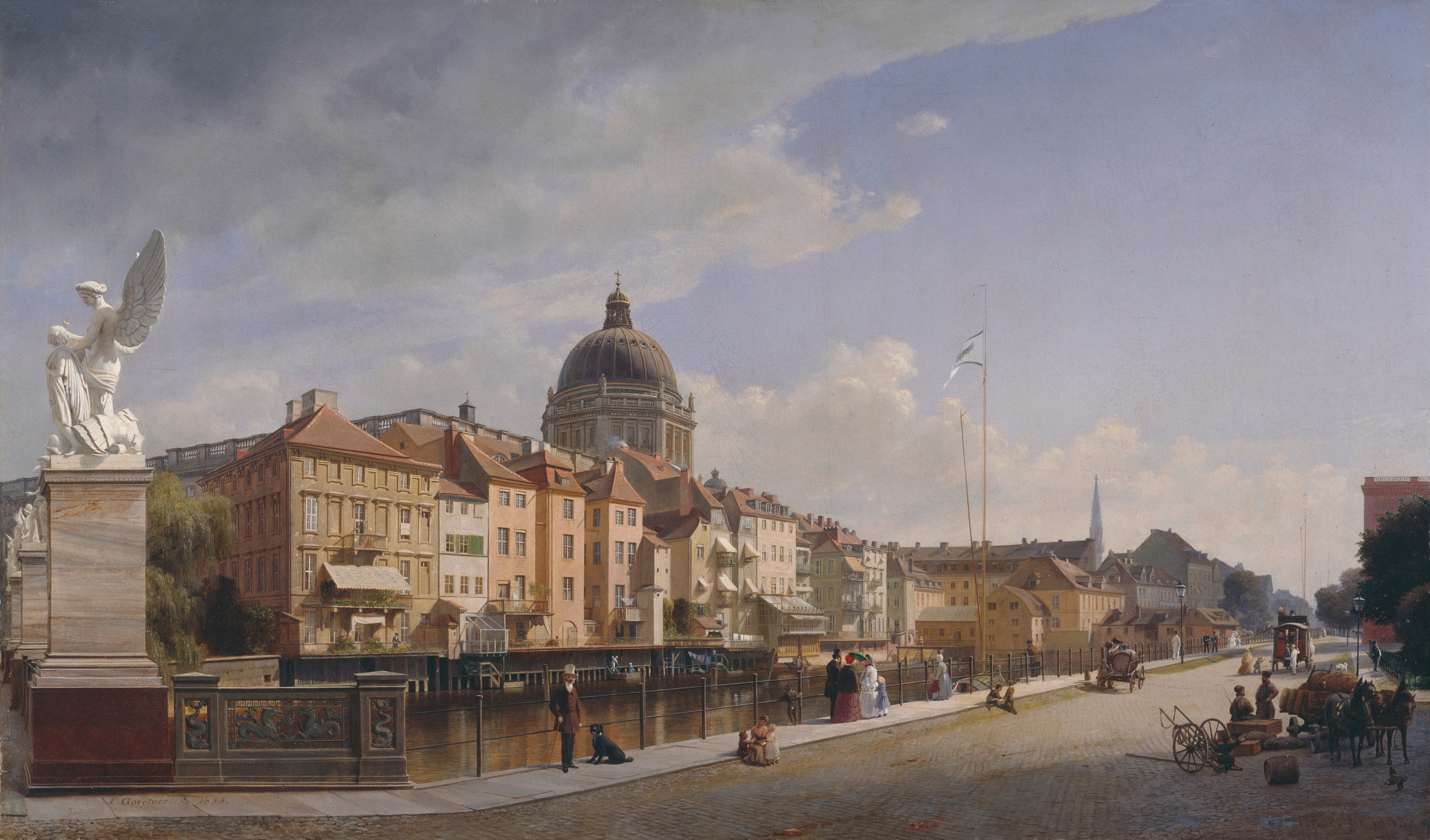
Rear view of the Houses at Schloßfreiheit

=== Successes ===
Upon his return to Berlin, he became a free-lance painter. In 1829, he married and ultimately had twelve children. Over the next ten years, he devoted himself to documenting the Biedermeier style buildings of Berlin and, with royal customers in mind, produced a series of scenes depicting the castles in Bellevue, Charlottenburg and Glienicke. In 1833, he was admitted to the Academy and designated a "Perspective Painter".

The following year, he began his most famous work: a six panel panorama of Berlin. It was painted from the roof of the Friedrichswerder Church, which is flat (and a popular place for sightseers, because all of the city's best-known buildings can be seen from there). This work was purchased by the King and a second version was bought by the King's daughter, Tsarina Alexandra Feodorovna. Its purchase became the occasion for a trip to Moscow and St. Petersburg (1837–1838), during which Gaertner painted extensively.

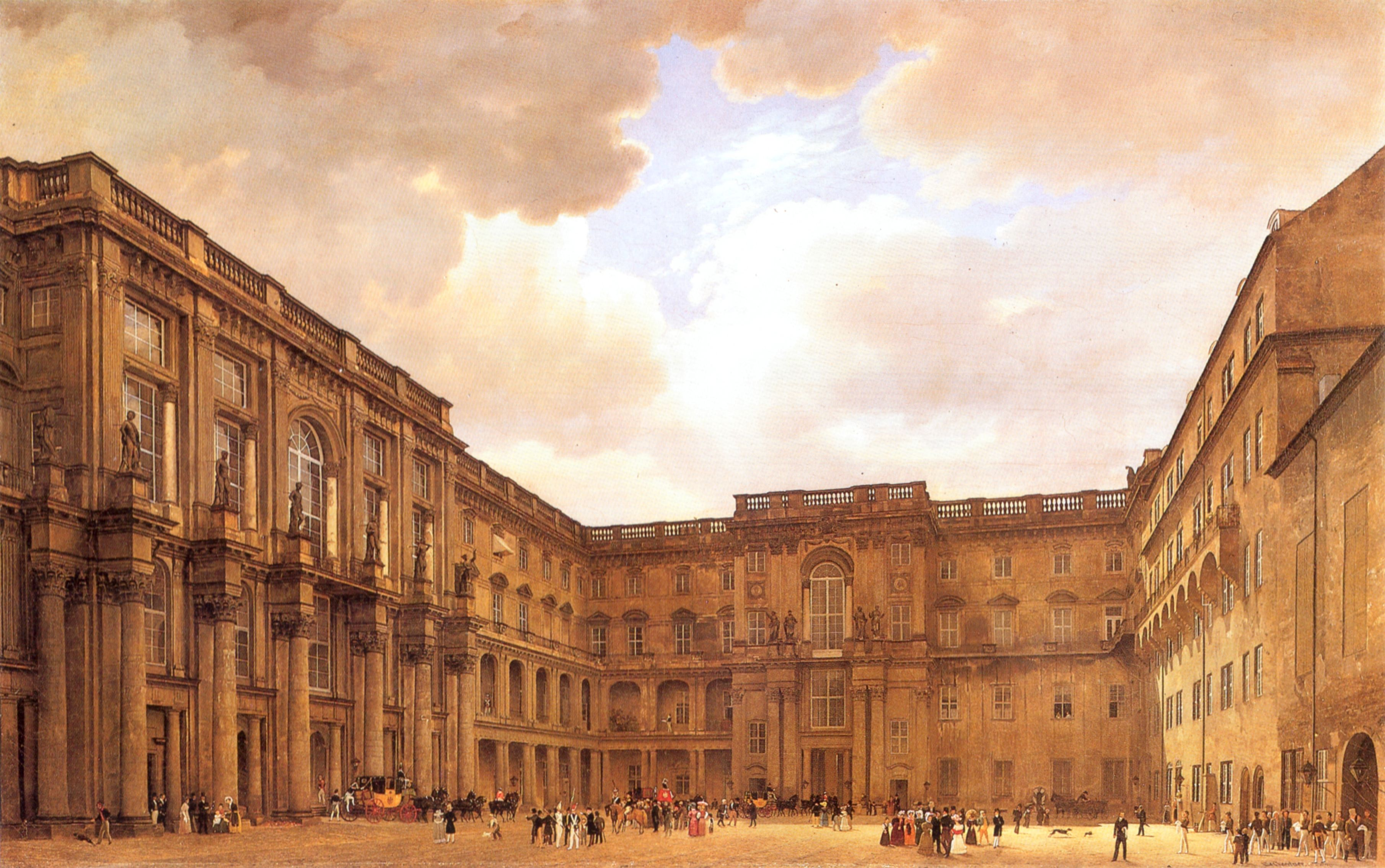
Schlüterhof at Berlin Palace

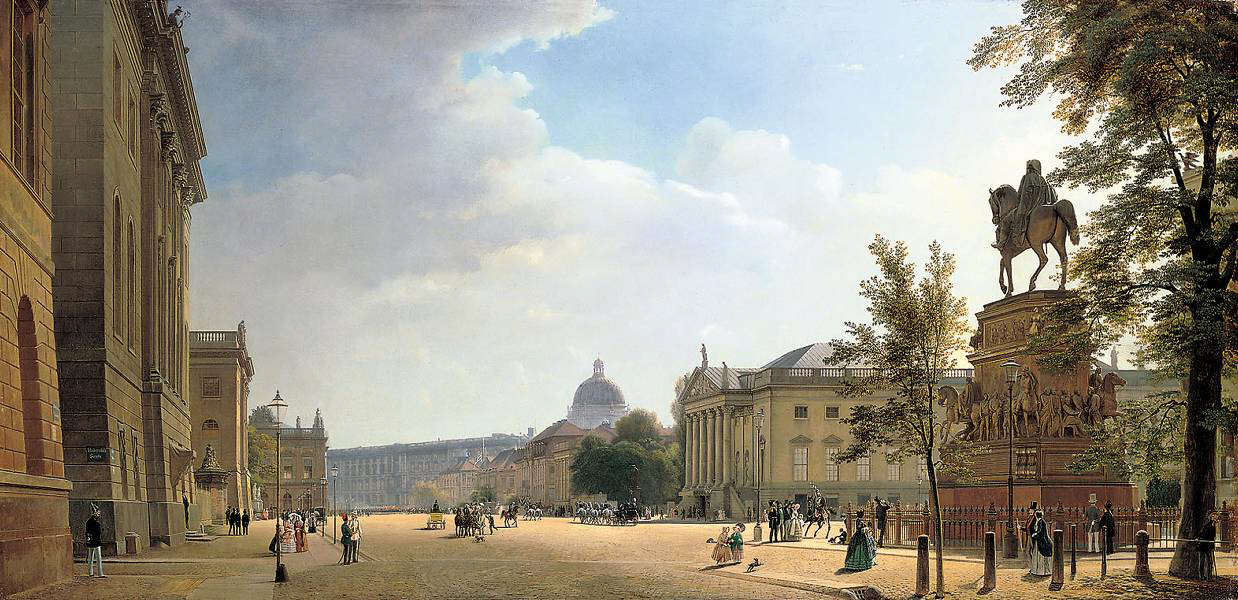
Unter den Linden, Berlin

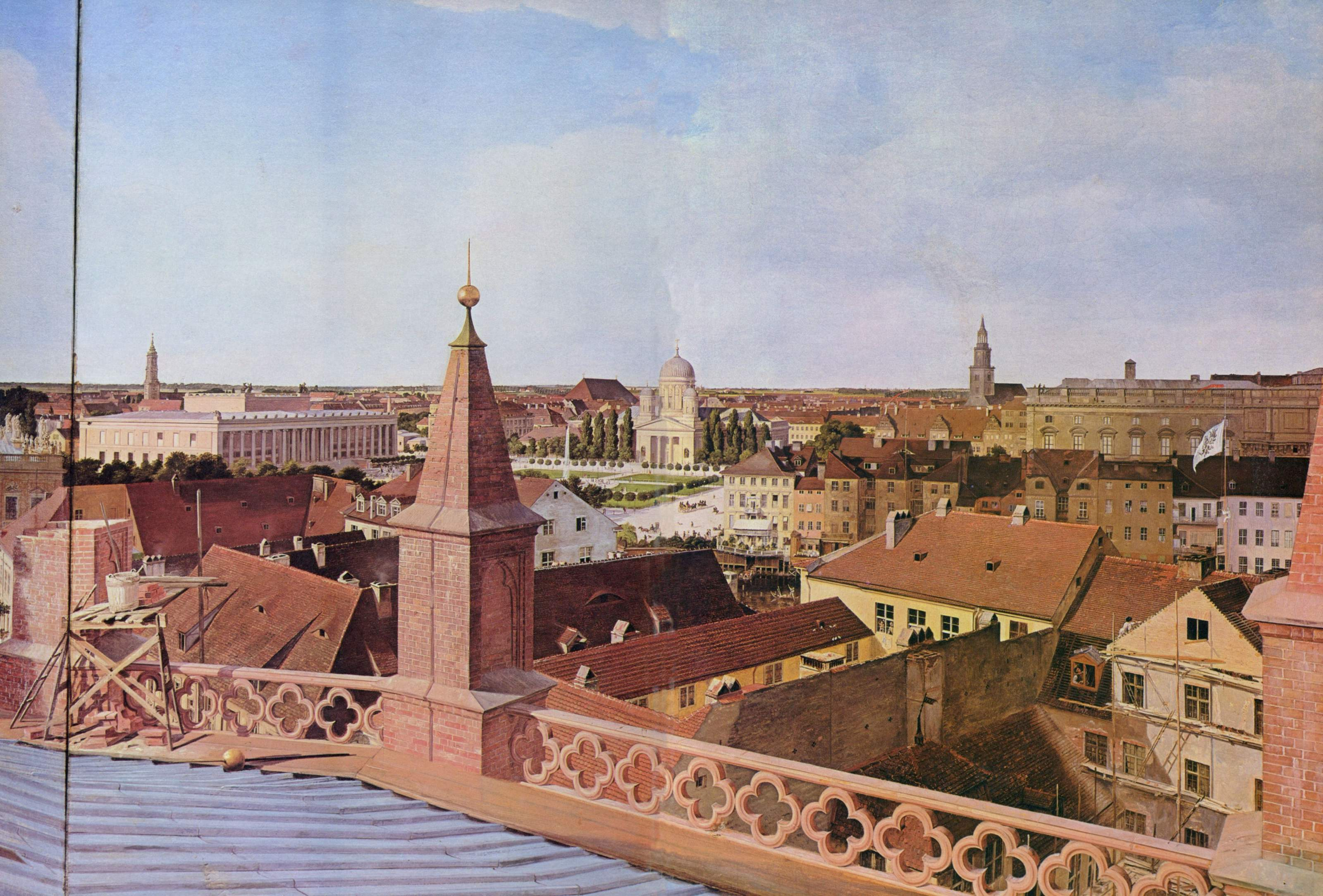
Part of the panorama of Berlin, Altes Museum is on the left

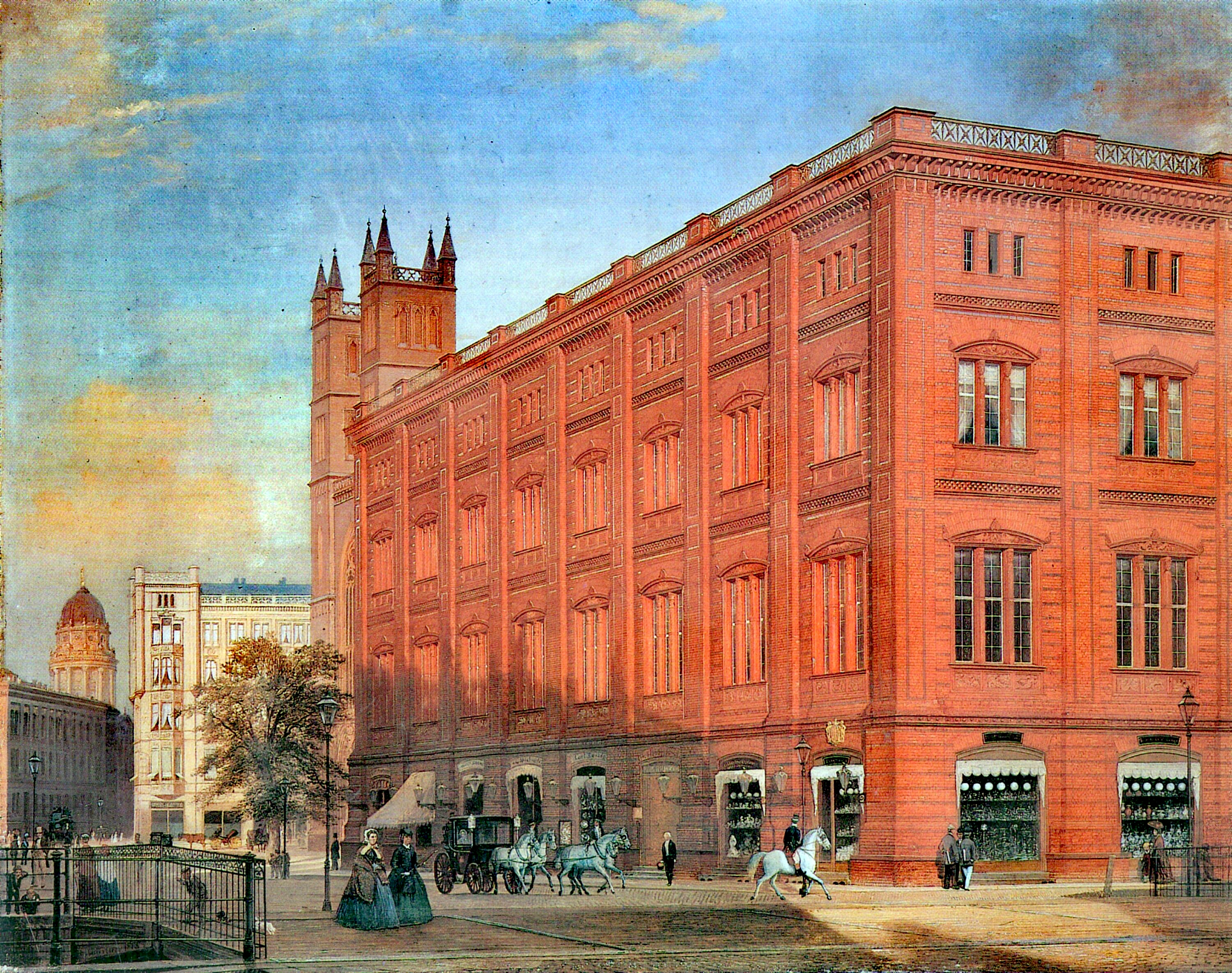
Bauakademie, Berlin

== Career decline ==
In 1840, King Friedrich Wilhelm III died. His successor, Friedrich Wilhelm IV, preferred Italian-style paintings with Greek landscapes and bought very little from Gaertner who, without the income from his principal client, soon began to have financial difficulties.

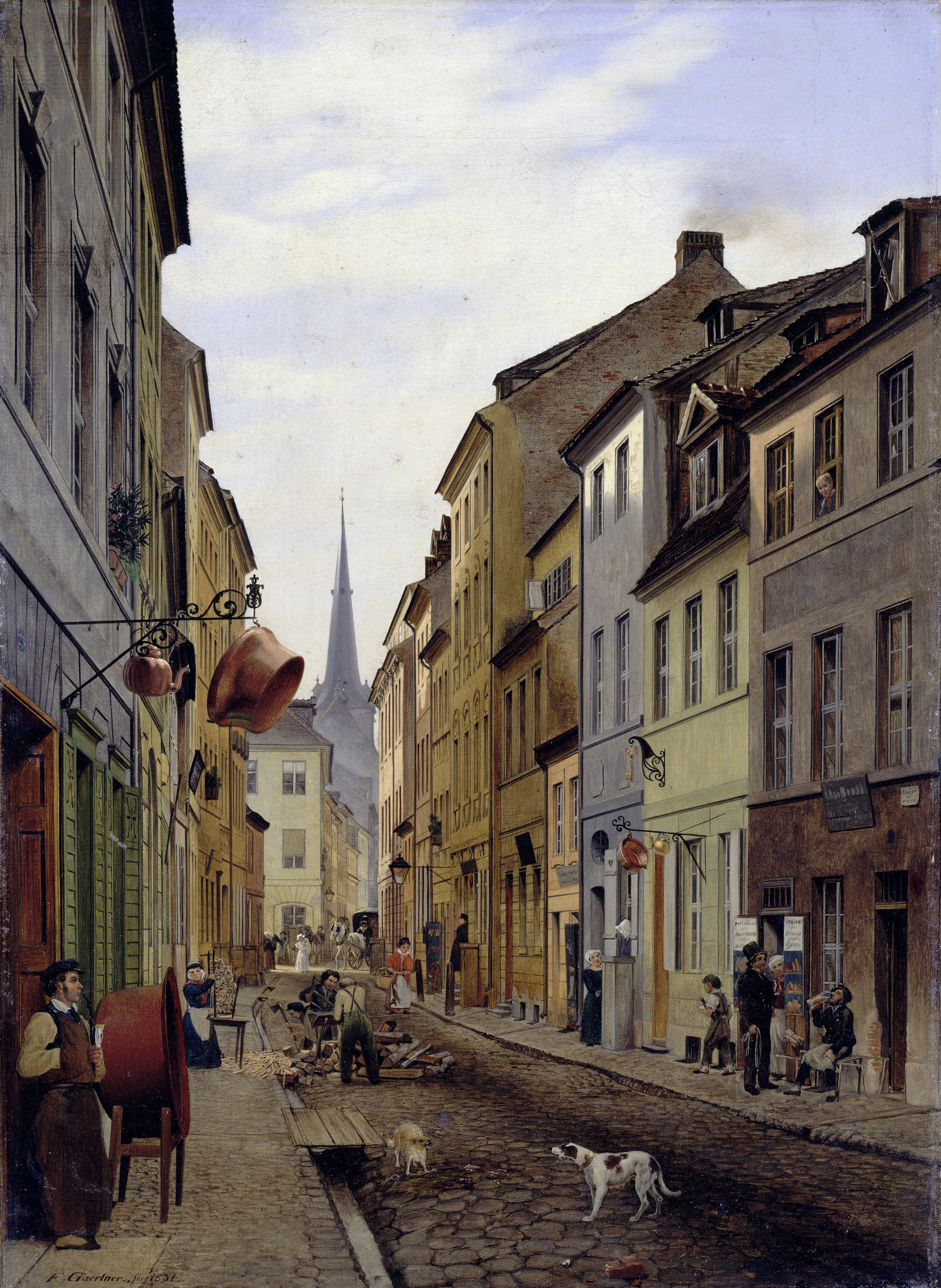
Parochialstraße in Berlin, 1831

He eventually made contact with a group that was interested in the protection and restoration of monuments and needed to have an illustrated inventory of them. As a result, Gaertner traveled to villages and towns throughout Prussia, making watercolor sketches, including scenic views meant to be sold on his return to Berlin. By this means, he was able to attract some middle-class customers, but they proved to be no substitute for royal patronage. He began to turn away from architecture, producing romantic scenes full of steep cliffs, Roma, ruins, and oak trees, but never restored that patronage. His paintings from this period are generally considered to be inferior.

As the century progressed, he increasingly suffered from competition with the newly emerging art of photography. In 1870, he and his family decided to leave the hectic atmosphere of Berlin and settle in Flecken Zechlin, a rural area near Rheinsberg. It was there that he died in 1877. His widow requested an annual allowance of 150 Marks from the Artist Support Fund of the Academy, but her application was denied. His works were virtually forgotten until the "Deutschen Jahrhundert-Ausstellung" of 1906 when they were shown again. Major exhibitions were staged in 1968, 1977, and 2001.

== Method ==
It is believed that he made use of a camera obscura to sketch the layouts of his paintings. Although this is not expressly mentioned in his working notes, he does make oblique references to a "drafting machine" and some of his sketches are done on tracing paper. He also possessed a collection of photographs, but there is no indication that these were used as models.

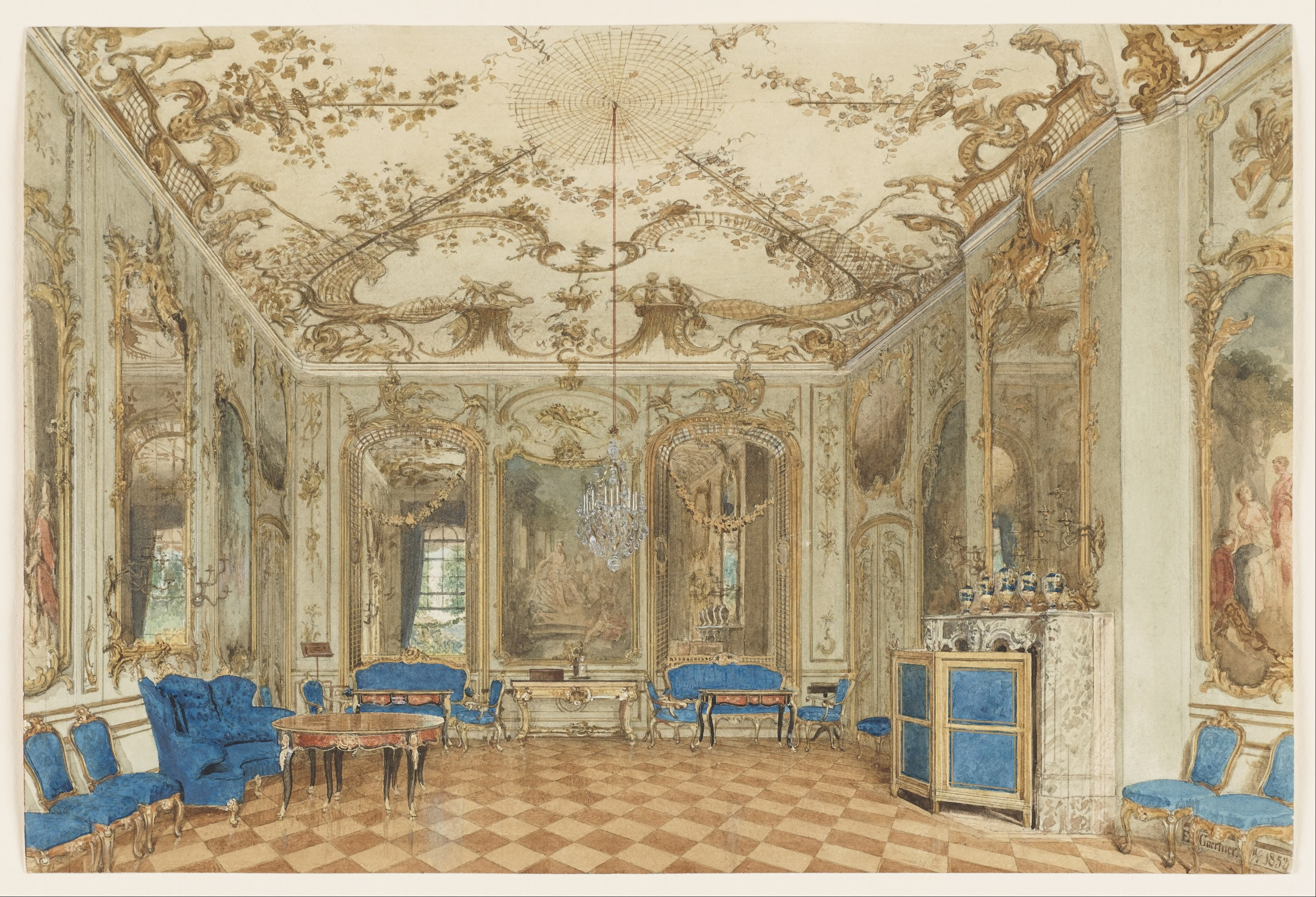
Concert Room of Sanssouci Palace, Potsdam, Germany

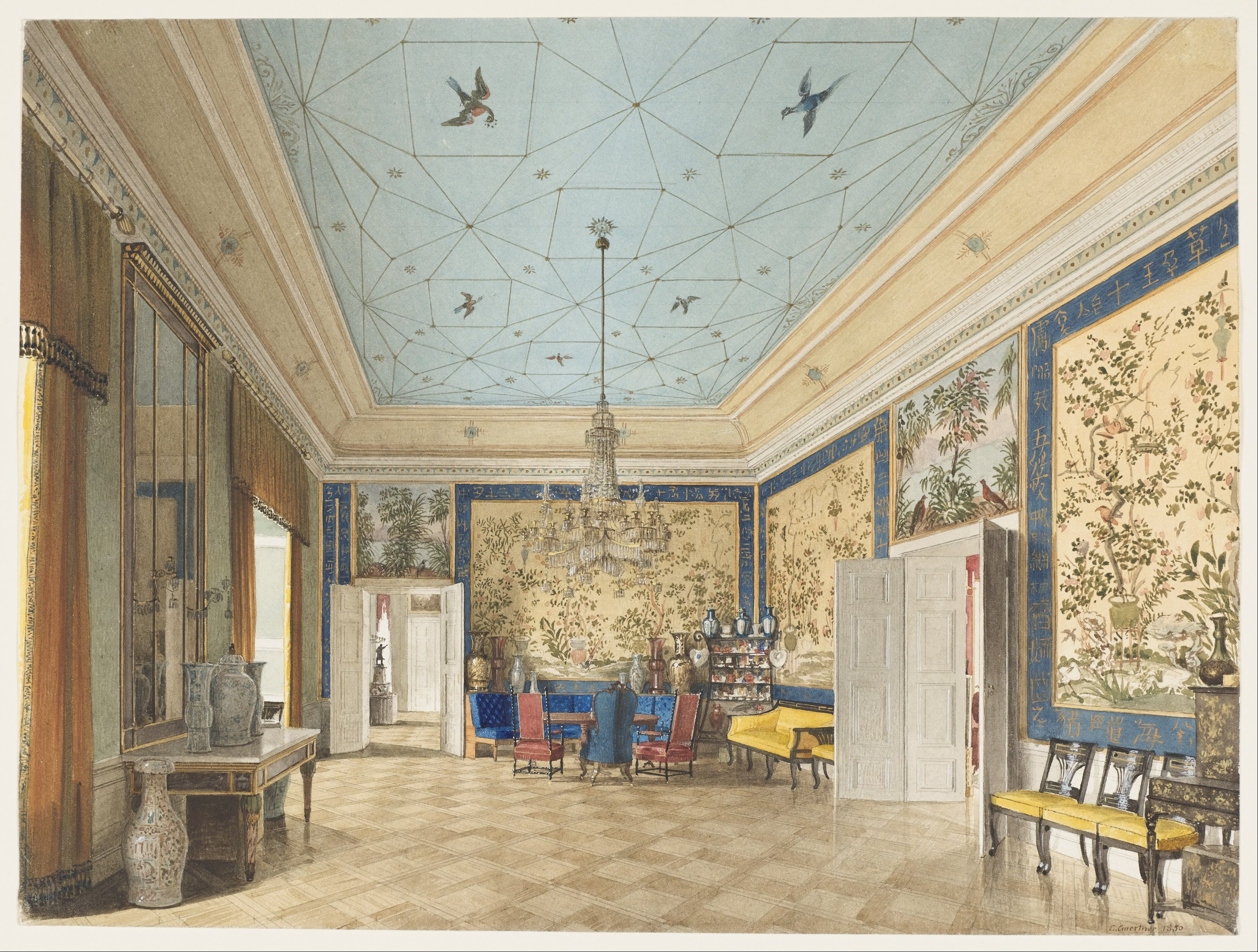
The Chinese Room in the Royal Palace, Berlin

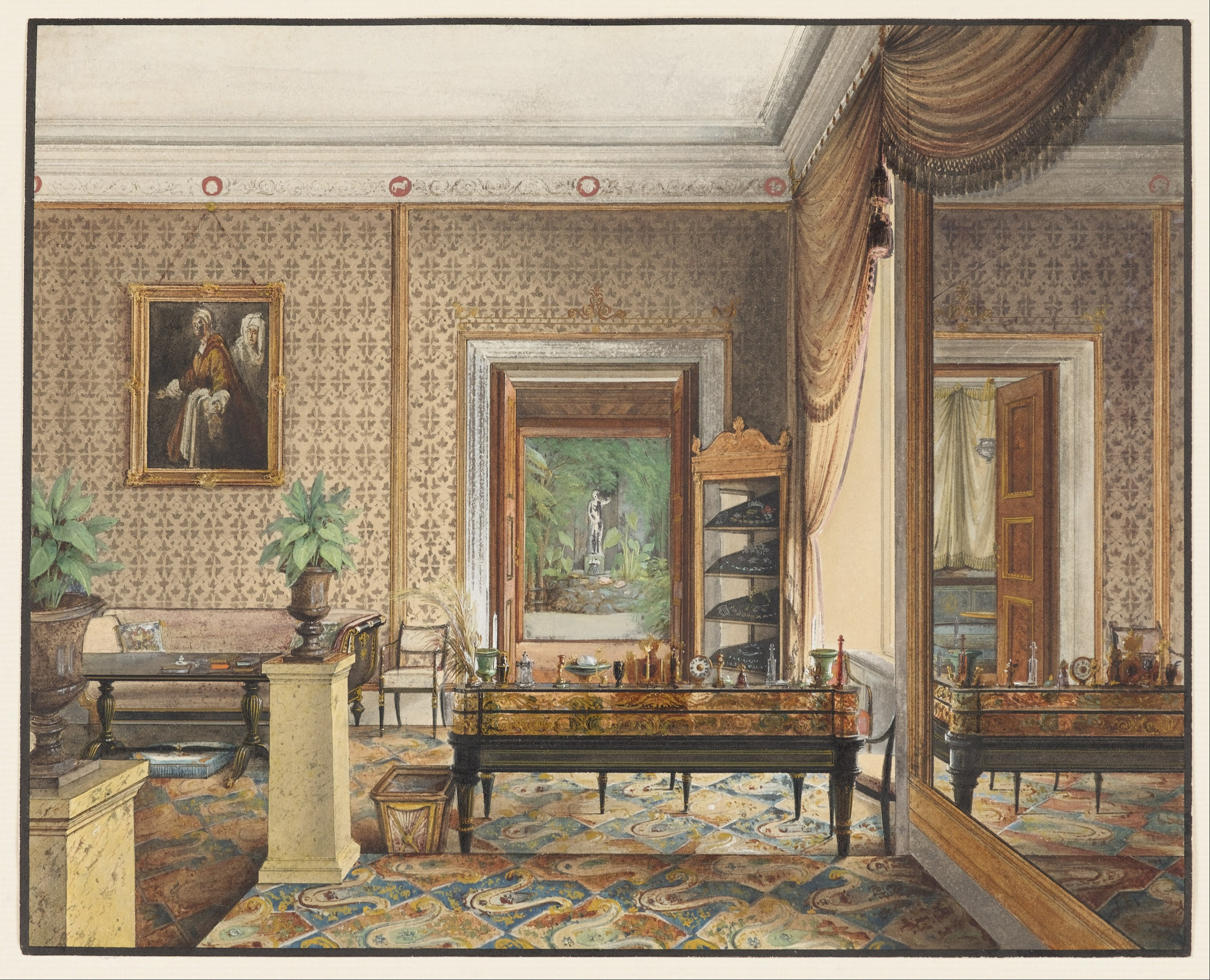
The Study of Prince Karl of Prussia

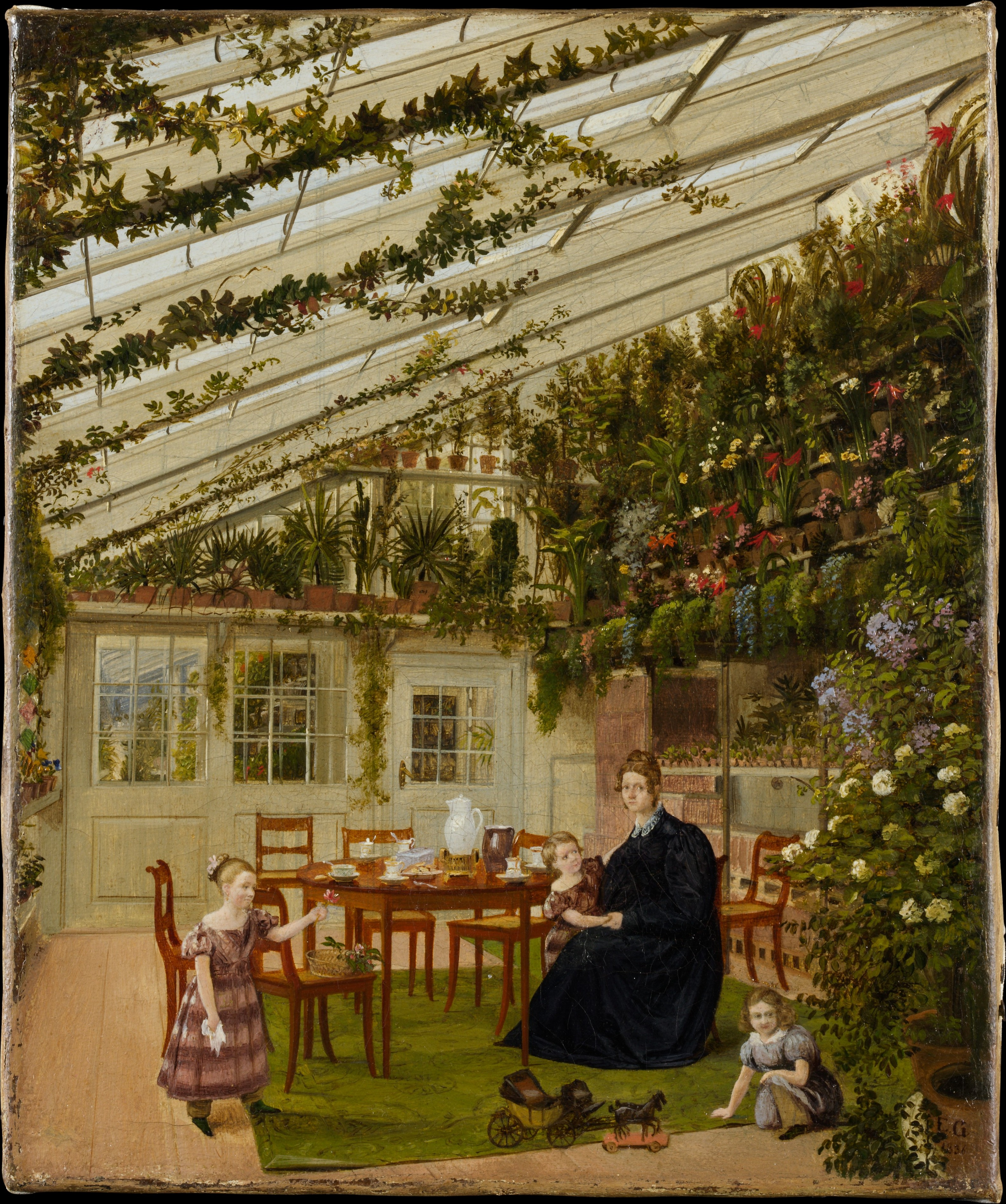
The Family of Mr. Westfal in the Conservatory, 1836, in the collection of the Metropolitan Museum of Art.

== Sources and further reading ==
- Robert Dohme (1878). "Gärtner, Eduard" . Allgemeine Deutsche Biographie (in German). Vol. 8. Leipzig: Duncker & Humblot. p. 381.
- Irmgard Wirth (1964). "Gaertner, Johann Philipp Eduard". Neue Deutsche Biographie (in German). Vol. 6. Berlin: Duncker & Humblot. p. 24. (full text online).
- Irmgard Wirth: Eduard Gaertner. Der Berliner Architekturmaler. Propyläen, Frankfurt 1979, ISBN 3-549-06636-8.
- Dominik Bartmann: Eduard Gaertner 1801–1877. Begleitband zur Ausstellung im Museum Ephraim-Palais, Berlin, 2001. Nicolai, Berlin 2001, ISBN 3-87584-070-4.
- Frauke Josenhans: Gaertner, (Johann Philipp) Eduard, in: Bénédicte Savoy, France Nerlich : Pariser Lehrjahre. Ein Lexikon zur Ausbildung deutscher Maler in der französischen Hauptstadt. Vol. 1: 1793-1843. De Gruyter, Berlin/Boston 2013, ISBN 978-3-11-029057-8, pp. 86–90.
