= The Family of Mr. Westfal in the Conservatory =

1836 painting by Eduard Gaertner

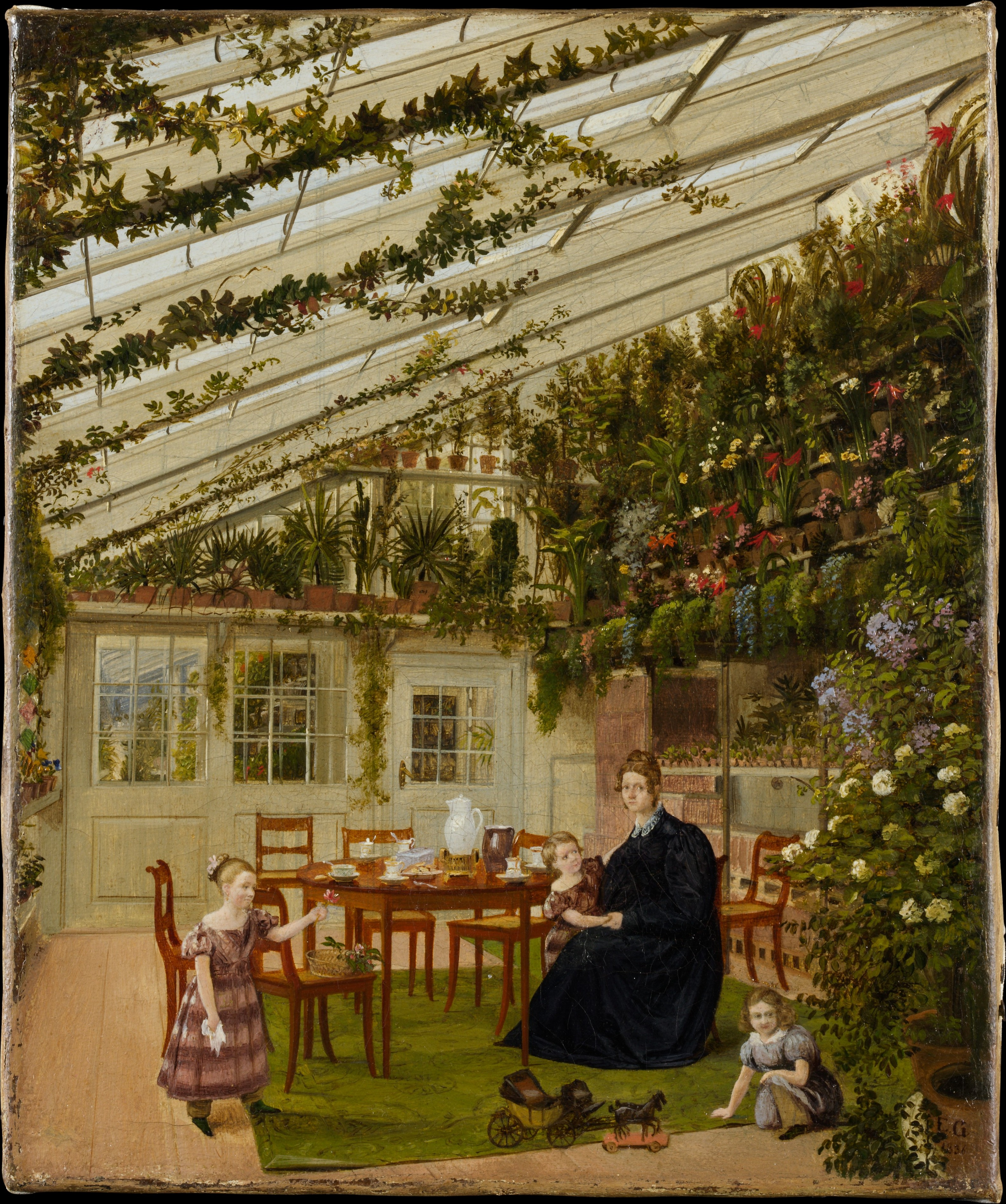
- Artist: Eduard Gaertner
- Year: 1836
- Medium: Oil on canvas
- Dimensions: 23.8 cm × 20 cm (9.4 in × 7.9 in)
- Location: Metropolitan Museum of Art; New York City
- Accession: 2007.70

The Family of Mr. Westfal in the Conservatory is an early 19th-century painting by German artist Eduard Gaertner. The painting depicts a conservancy owned by Christian Carl Westphal and his family. A wealthy Berlin merchant known for his love of horticulture, Westphal was also Gaertner's landlord. The small painting is one of only four interior scenes painted by Gaertner. It was acquired by the Metropolitan Museum of Art in 2007, and remains in the museum's collection.

The sitters in the painting are Emilie Eleonore Dorothee Schultze, Westphal's second wife, and the couple's three children.
