= Magasin för konst, nyheter och moder =

Swedish fashion magazine

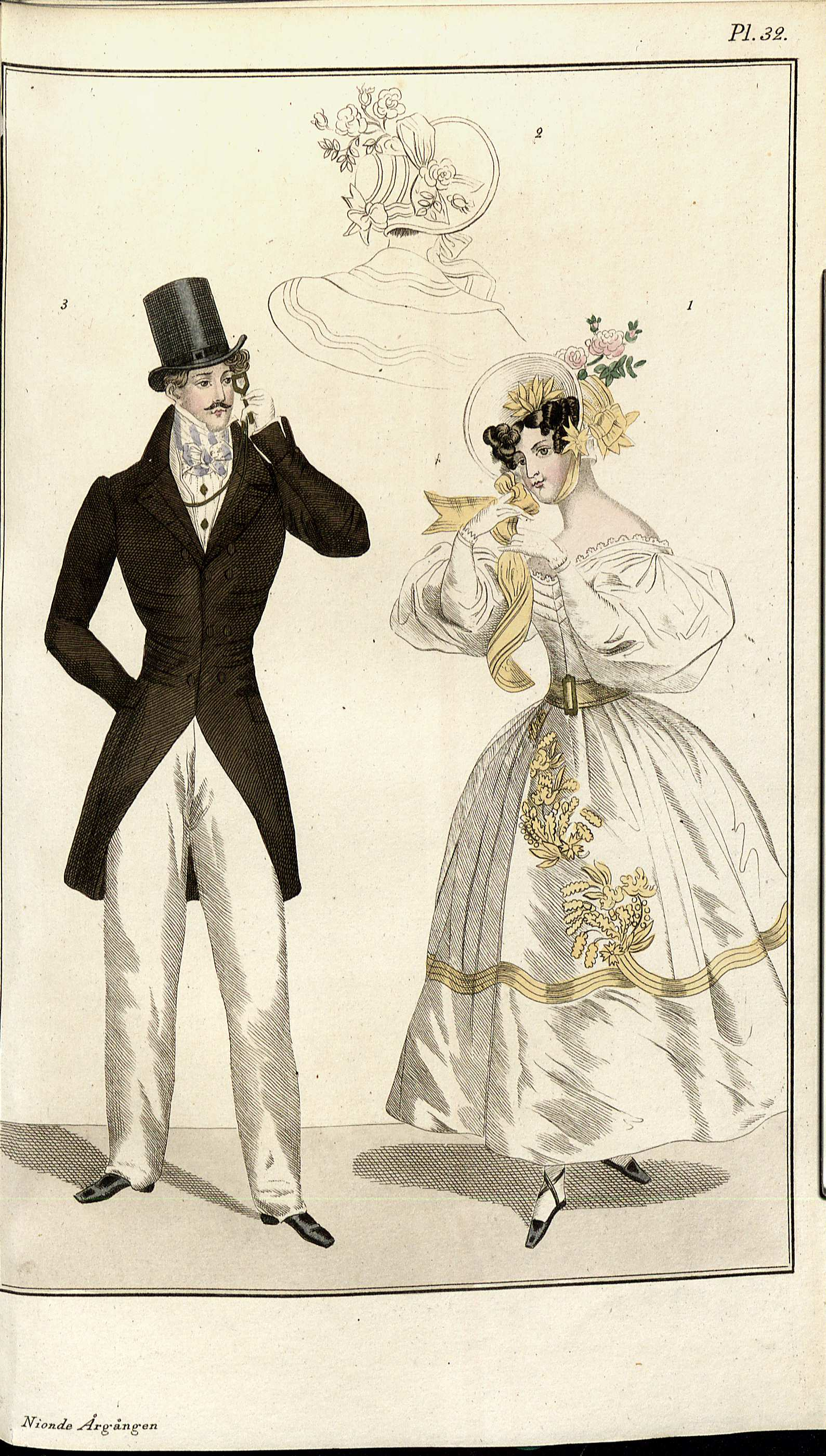
Magasin för konst, nyheter och moder 1832, illustration nr 32

Magasin för konst, nyheter och moder (meaning Magazine for Art, News and Fashion in English) was an illustrated Swedish fashion magazine, published between 1823 and 1844 by Fredrik Boije. It is recognized to be the first true fashion magazine in Sweden. It was also among the first fashion magazines outside France. The magazine was published monthly.
