= Dominik Bartmann =

German art historian

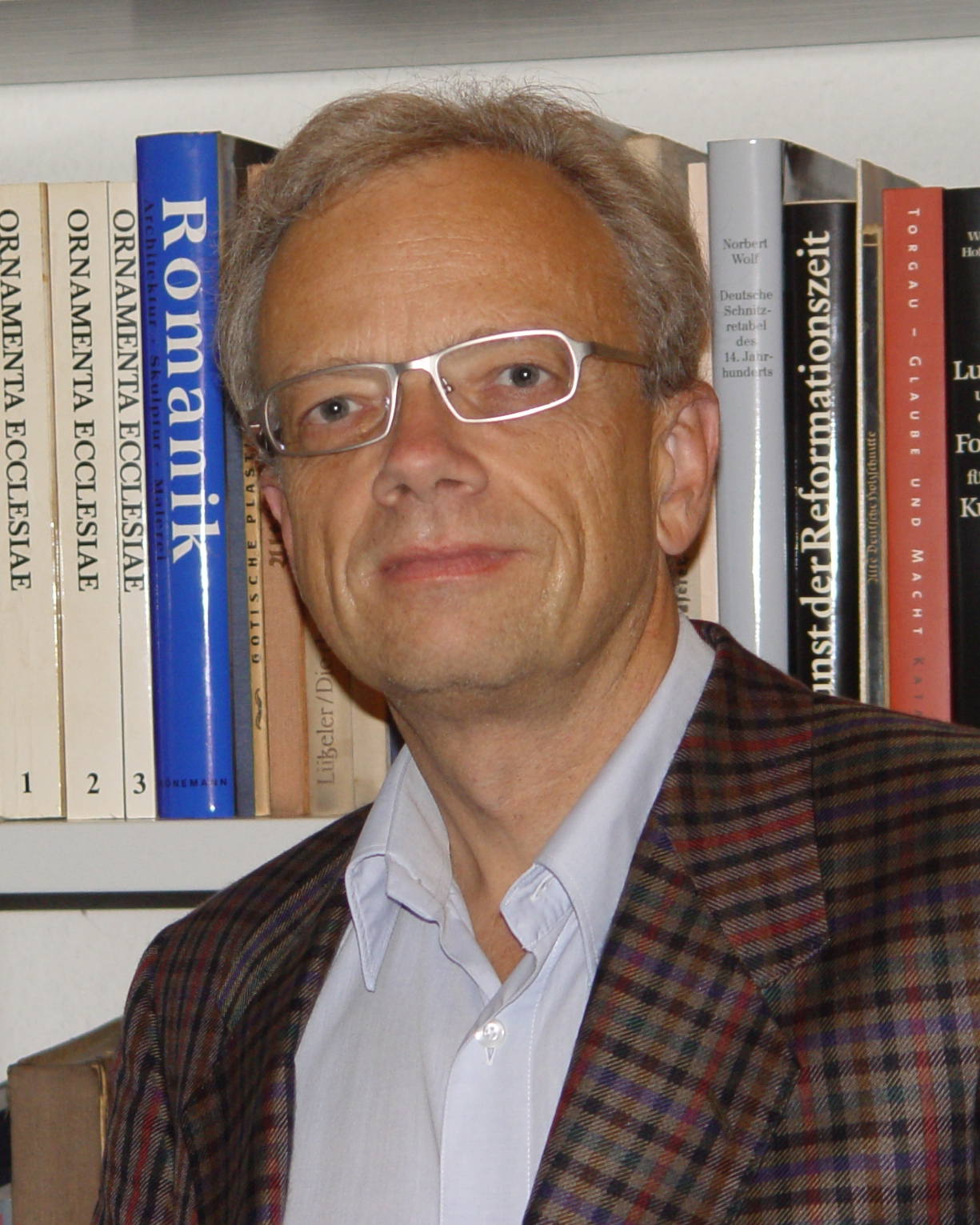
Dominik Bartmann

Dominik Bartmann (born 19 September 1953) is a German art historian and curator.

== Life ==
Born in Berlin as the second son of the laboratory physician Karl Bartmann and his wife Gisela, Baetmann studied art history, history and Germanistics at the Free University of Berlin and was awarded his doctorate in 1983 with the thesis Anton von Werner and his position in Wilhelmine art politics. He then worked at the Staatliche Museen zu Berlin. In 1984, he became head of the Collection of Prints and Drawings and, in 1992, temporary director of the Berlin Museum. After it was merged into the Stiftung Stadtmuseum Berlin, he became department director "Fine Arts" in 1995 and department director "Exhibitions" in 2007.

Bartmann is chairman of the board of trustees of the "Museumsstiftung Dr. Otto und Ilse Augustin" and the "Carl-Heinz-und-Helga-Kliemann-Stiftung". He is a member of the advisory board of the "Stiftung Berlinische Galerie", the board of trustees of the "Jeanne Mammen Foundation", the board of the "Hans Meid Foundation" and the "Ilse Augustin Foundation for the Promotion of Visual Artists".

== Exhibition projects ==
- Berlin Drawing Art from Chodowiecki to Liebermann (1990)
- Anton von Werner - History in Pictures (1993)
- Jakob Steinhardt - The Prophet (1995)
- Berlin Painting from Blechen to Hofer (1995)
- Berlin Art Spring, Modernist Painting, Graphics and Sculpture (1997/98)
- Marianne Breslauer, Photographs 1927-1936 (2000)
- Jakob Steinhardt, drawings (2000)
- Max and Erwin Fabian, Berlin - London - Melbourne (2001)
- Eduard Gaertner 1801-1877. Stiftung Stadtmuseum, Berlin 2001, ISBN 3-87584-070-4.
- Painter of Love, Kurt Mühlenhaupt on his 80th birthday (2001).
- Rolf Lindemann (2001)
- Raphael Rheinsberg - Heroes (2002)
- Renate Anger, Tagewerke (2003)
- Birgit Dieker, Blood ties (2003)
- Magnus Zeller, Rapture and Turmoil (2003)
- Jens Lorenzen, REAL (2004)
- Rita Preuss, The Things of Life (2004)
- The Painter in the Landscape. C.-H. Kliemann on the occasion of his 80th birthday (2004)
- Yehudith Bach, Painting and Graphics (2005)
- From Liebermann to Pechstein - Art of the Berlin Secession (2005)
- Wolfgang Peuker 1945-2001 (2005)
- Nocturnal Day, Wilhelm Kohlhoff 1893-1971 (2005)
- Biedermann's Evening Cosiness - Berlin from the Inside 1815-1848 (2007)
- Hans Meid 1883-1957. World and Counterworld (2008)
- Berlin in the Light (2008)
- Dance on the Volcano. Berlin in the Twenties in the Mirror of the Arts (2015).

== Publications ==
- August Macke, Kunsthandwerk. Glasbilder, Stickereien, Keramike, Holzarbeiten und Entwürfe, Berlin 1979, ISBN 3-548-36067-X
- Helmuth Macke, Recklinghausen 1989, ISBN 3-7647-0330-X
- Berlin Museum. Von Chodowiecki bis Liebermann. Katalog der Zeichnungen, Aquarelle, Pastelle und Gouachen des 18. und 19. Jh. (with Gert-Dieter Ulferts), Berlin 1990, ISBN 3-7861-1615-6
- Anton von Werner. Zur Kunst und Kunstpolitik im Deutschen Kaiserreich, Berlin 1985, ISBN 3-87157-108-3
- Anton von Werner. Geschichte in Bildern, Munich 1993, ISBN 3-7774-6140-7
- Jakob Steinhardt. Zeichnungen, Berlin 2000, ISBN 3-910029-26-4
- Eduard Gaertner 1801-1977, Berlin 2001, ISBN 3-87584-070-4
- Magnus Zeller, Entrückung und Aufruhr, Berlin 2002, ISBN 3-910029-33-7, ISBN 3-931768-67-8
- Der Maler in der Landschaft, Berlin 2004, ISBN 3-910029-35-3
- Stadtmuseum Berlin, Gemälde II. Verzeichnis des Bestandes vom Ende des 19. Jh. bis 1945, Berlin 2004, ISBN 3-910029-37-X
- Hans Meid 1883-1957. Welt und Gegenwelt, Berlin 2008, ISBN 978-3-940939-00-5
