= Per Wickenberg =

Swedish painter

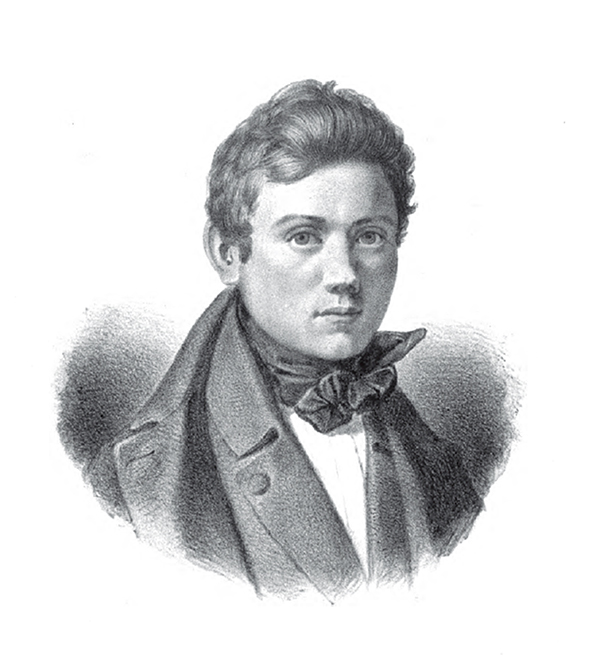
Per Wickenberg

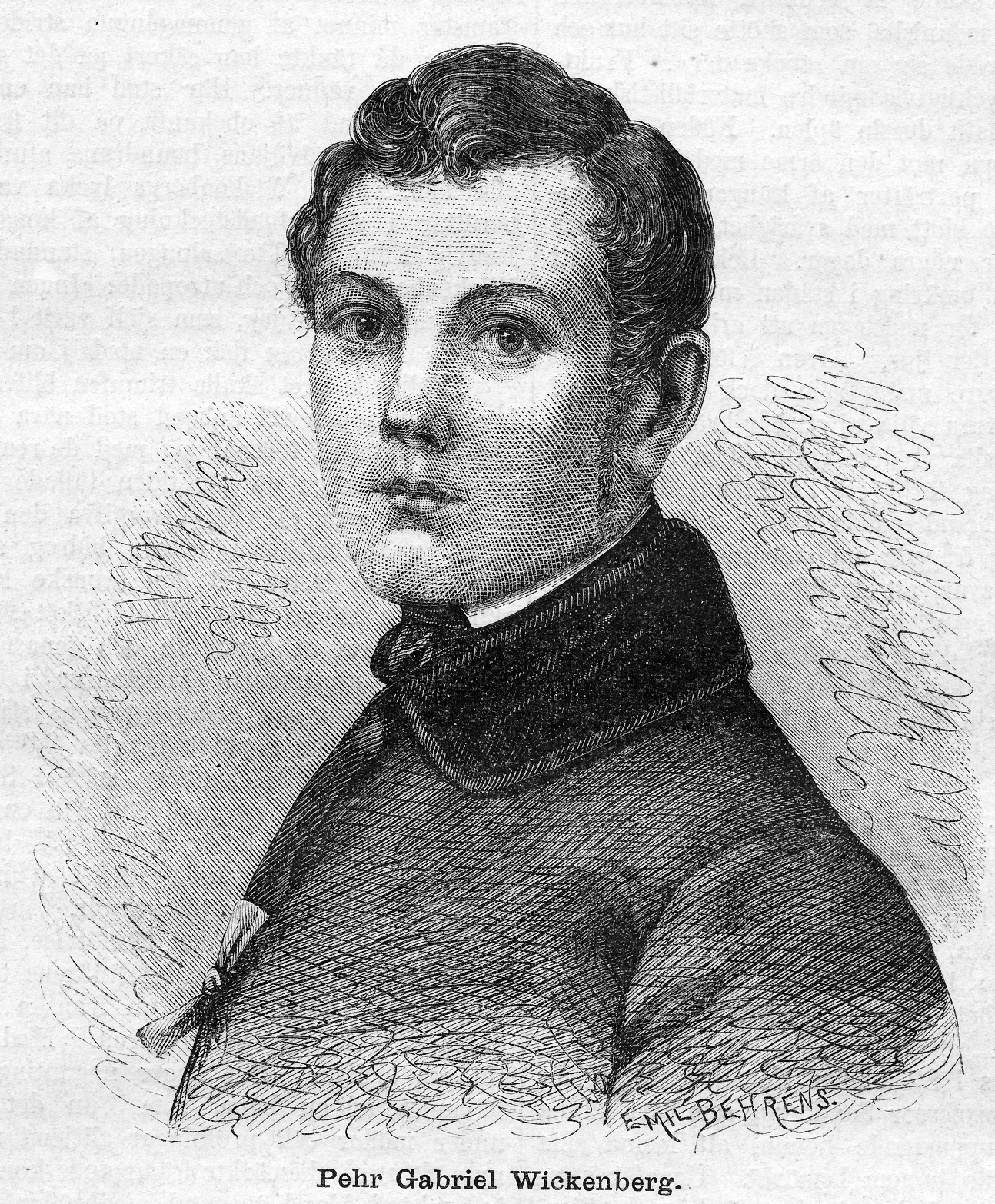
Per Wickenberg; posthumous portrait by Emil Behrens (1877)

Petter Gabriel Wickenberg, known as Per (1 October 1812- 19 December 1846) was a Swedish painter and designer who specialized in landscapes with figures.

== Biography ==
Wickenberg was born in Malmö, Sweden. He was the son of Jonas Wickenberg and his wife Katharina Isberg. His father was an officer (fanjunkare) in the Swedish Army. He showed an early talent for drawing and painting and began taking private lessons when he was thirteen. After completing his secondary education in 1830, he helped support his family by selling goods from the barges in Malmö. The following year, friends and family took up a collection and raised enough money for him to enroll at the Royal Swedish Academy of Fine Arts.

Despite the assistance, after a time in Stockholm he found himself in financial difficulty. This was lessened somewhat when he was offered lodging with the family of Michael Anckarsvärd (1742-1838), a military officer who was also a part-time artist. To complete his studies, he earned some money by colorizing the illustrations of naval officer Carl Gustaf Forsell (1783-1848) for publication in Ett år i Sverige.

He also received support from Johan Gustaf Sandberg (1782–1854) which proved critical, as well as from the new Swedish Association for Art (Sveriges allmänna konstförening) which had been founded in 1832. During a cholera epidemic in 1834/35, he was able to stay at a farm in Närke owned by Johan August Anckarsvärd (1783-1874).

In 1836, he developed some type of eye disease. Once again, members of the Anckarsvärd family came to his rescue and collected the funds necessary for him to visit the spa in Töplitz for a cure. After his recovery, he spent some time in Berlin with the scenic artist and decorator, Karl Wilhelm Gropius (1793–1870).

Soon after, he went to Paris where he shared a studio with the artist Olof Johan Södermark (1790-1848), until he was able to afford his own on the Rue Saint-Honoré. He soon attracted a wealthy clientele and was able to obtain a larger studio on the Rue de la Bienfaisance in Paris. In 1838, he was awarded a gold medal at the Paris Salon. The following year, he was named a member candidate (agré) at the Royal Academy of Painting and Sculpture (Académie royale de peinture et de sculpture) and received full membership in 1842, the same year he was awarded the Royal Order of Vasa in Sweden.

He had been travelling around France and the Low Countries and in 1843 had a brief stay in London. During this time, he suffered from increasingly poor health and his eye disorder recurred every year, leaving him unable to paint. When he was diagnosed with tuberculosis, he moved to Nice, then to the Pyrenees mountain resort of Eaux-Bonnes seeking a cure. It was to no avail and he died in nearby Pau in 1846, aged only thirty-four.

His works may be seen at the Nationalmuseum, Nordiska museet, Uppsala University Library, Lund University Library and the Musée du Luxembourg, among many others.

== Gallery ==
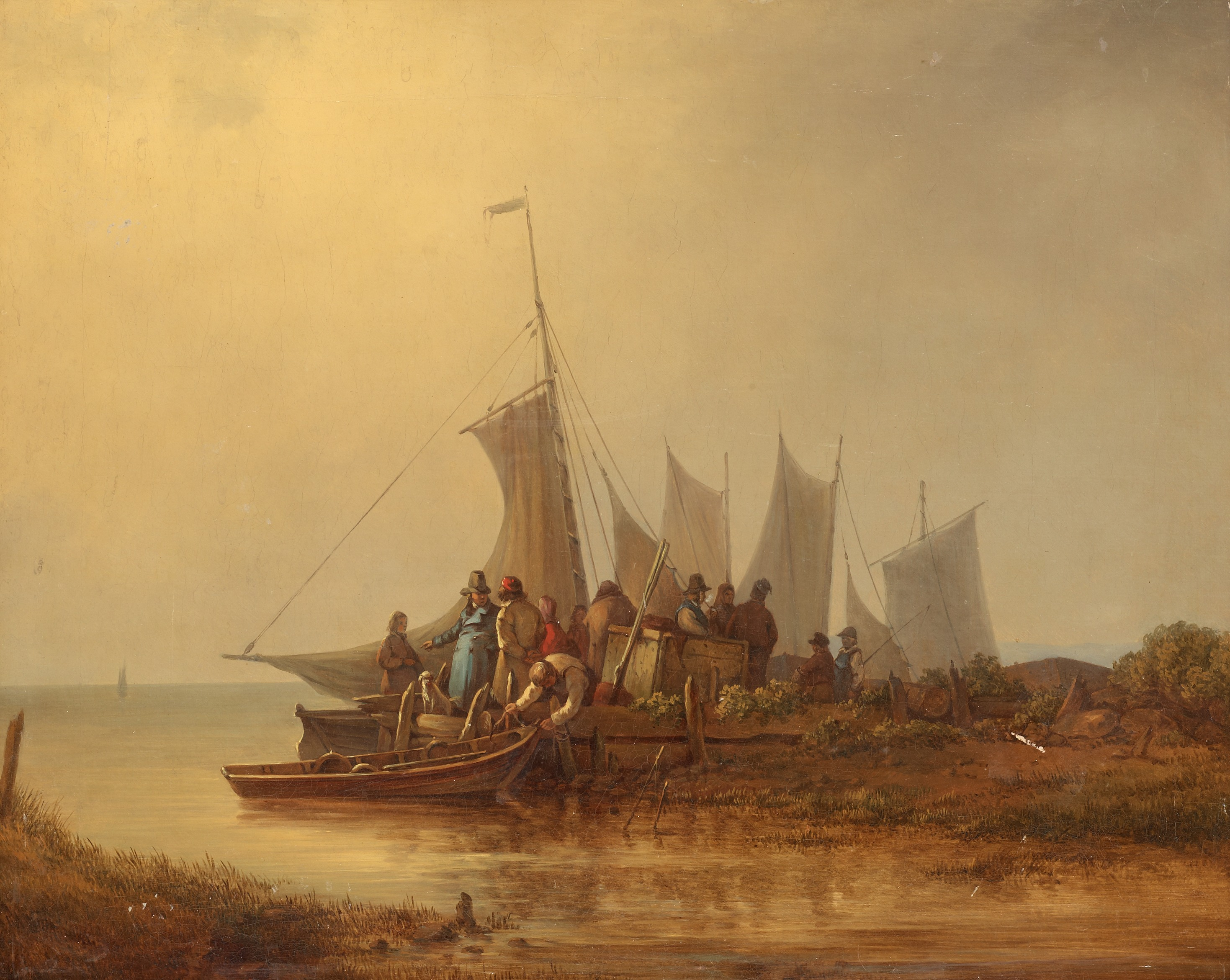
Sailing Ships and Fishermen (1835)

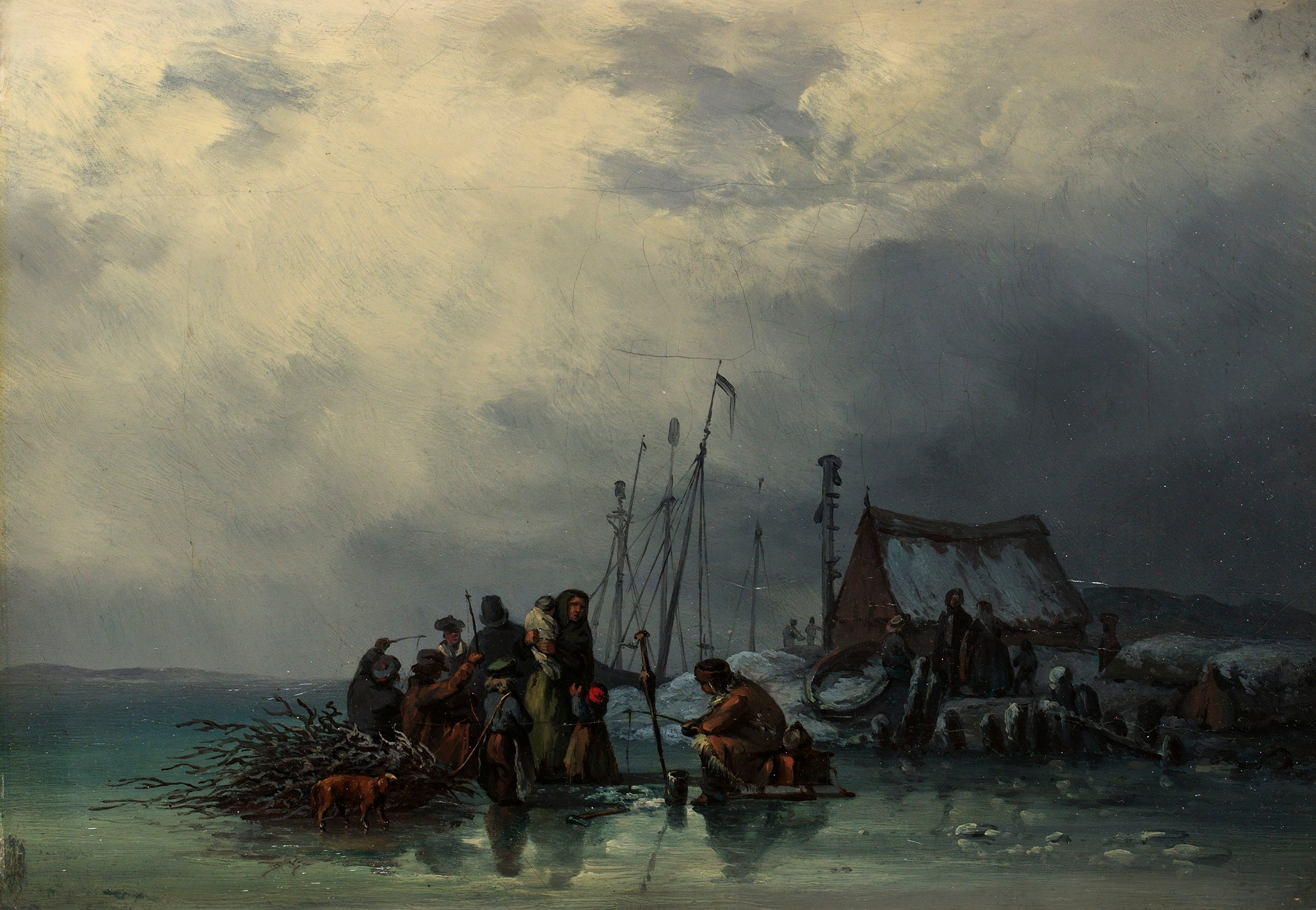
Winter Fishing (1839)

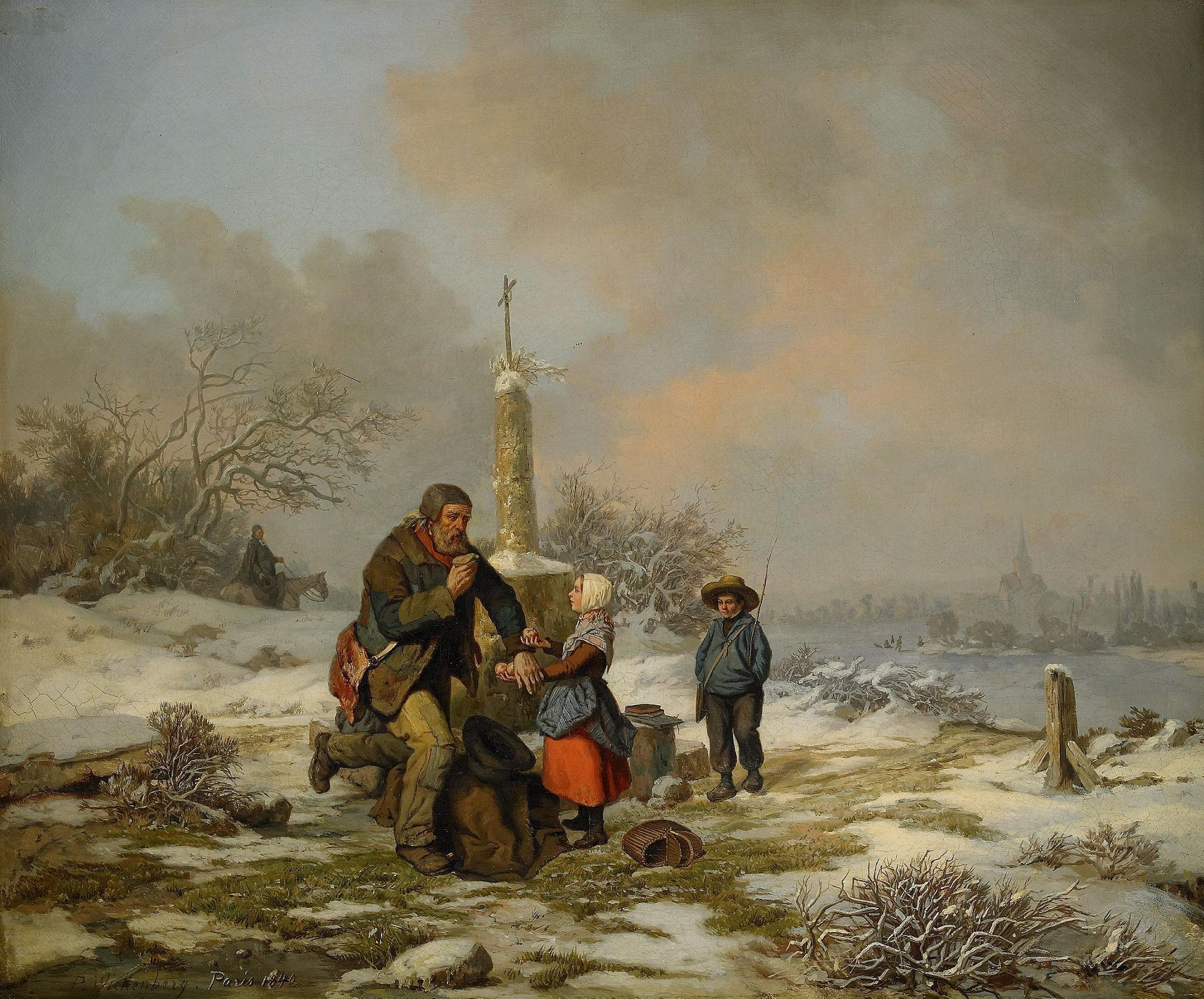
Winter Landscape with Man and Children at a Road Altar (1840)

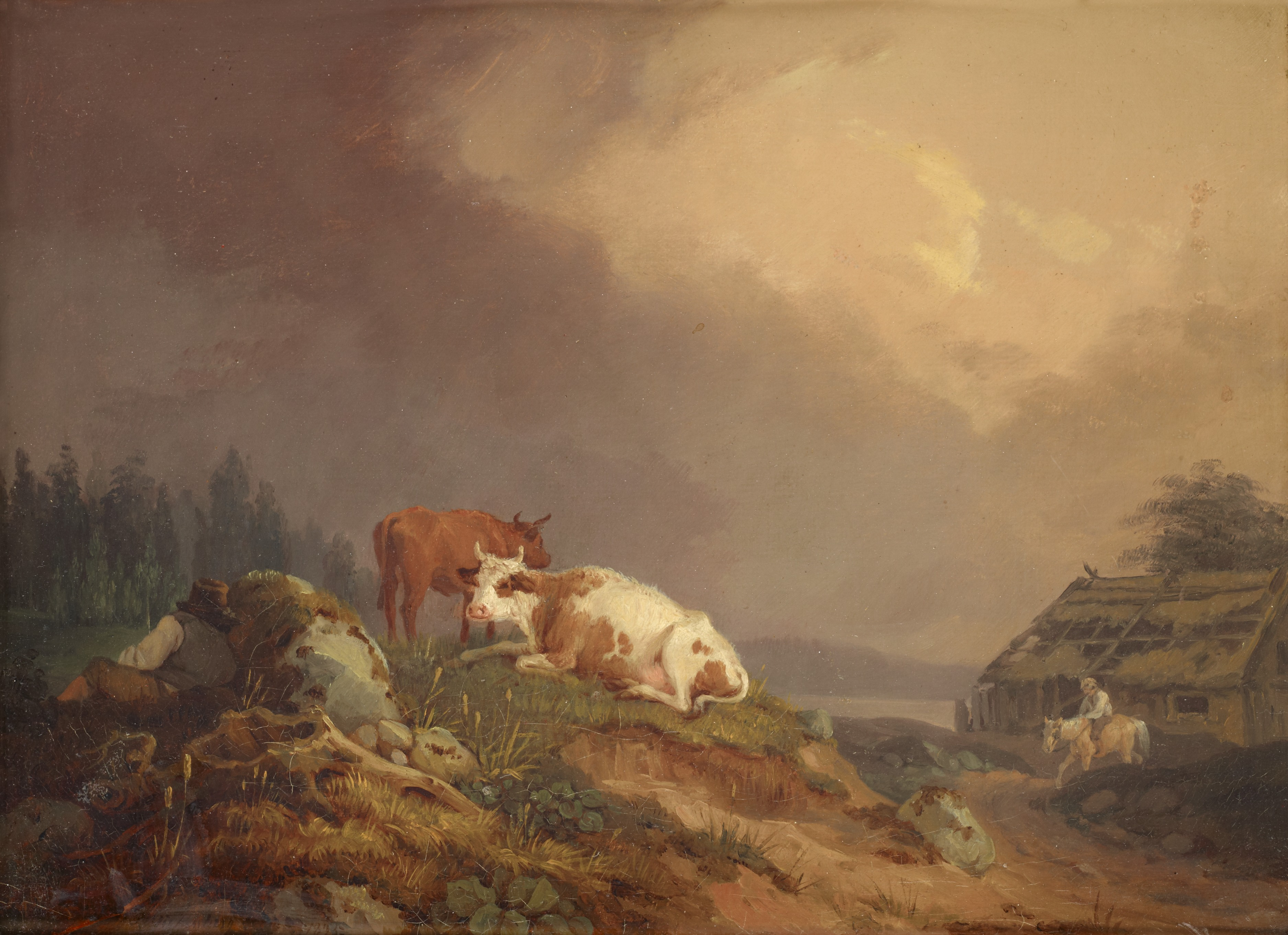
Landscape with Resting Cows (1835)

== Other sources ==
- Kruse, John (1901) Petter Gabriel Wickenberg, 1812-1846, ett konstnärsporträtt (Stockholm: Ivar Haeggström)
