= Svenskt biografiskt handlexikon =

Swedish biographical encyclopedia

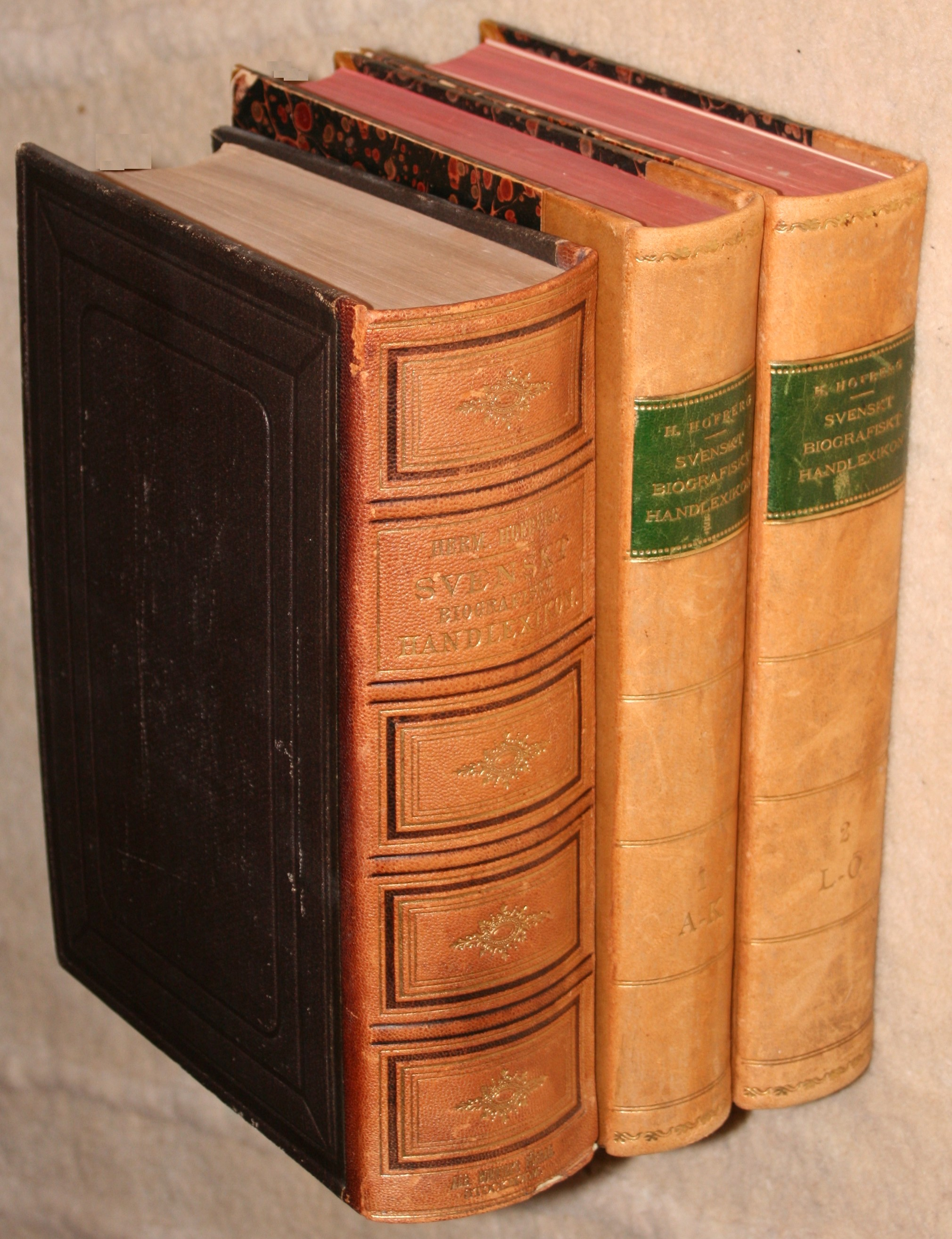
Covers of the 1st edition (1876) in one volume and 2nd edition (1906) in two volumes.

Svenskt biografiskt handlexikon (Swedish pronunciation: [ˈsvɛnːskt bɪʊˈɡrɑ̌ːfɪskt ˈhânːdˌlɛksɪkɔn]) is a compact Swedish dictionary of biography first published in 1873–1876 by the physician and antiquarian Herman Hofberg (1823–1883). The second, updated edition was published in 1906, under the editorship of Frithiof Heurlin, Viktor Millqvist, and Olof Rubenson. The second edition, two volumes of all together 1,445 pages, contains 4,419 articles on families and individuals, "renowned Swedish men and women from the reformation until the present times", and more than 3,000 miniature portraits.

== See also ==
- Svenskt biografiskt lexikon
