= Pechstein =

Pechstein is a German surname. Notable people with the surname include:

- Claudia Pechstein (born 1972), German speed skater
- Heidi Pechstein (born 1944), German swimmer
- Max Pechstein (1881–1955), German painter
  - 43724 Pechstein, main belt asteroid named after Max Pechstein
