= Bartman =

Bartman may refer to:

- Bartman, alter ego of Bart Simpson in The Simpsons
  - Bartman (comics), comic book of the alter ego character published by Bongo Comics
  - The Simpsons: Bartman Meets Radioactive Man, video game for the NES starring the alter ego character.
  - "Do the Bartman", song and music video based on the Bart Simpson character
- Steve Bartman incident, Chicago Cubs fan who gained exposure during the 2003 National League Championship Series

== See also ==
- Batman, fictional character
- Sarah Baartman, sometimes spelled Bartman
