= Karl Wilhelm Gropius =

German painter

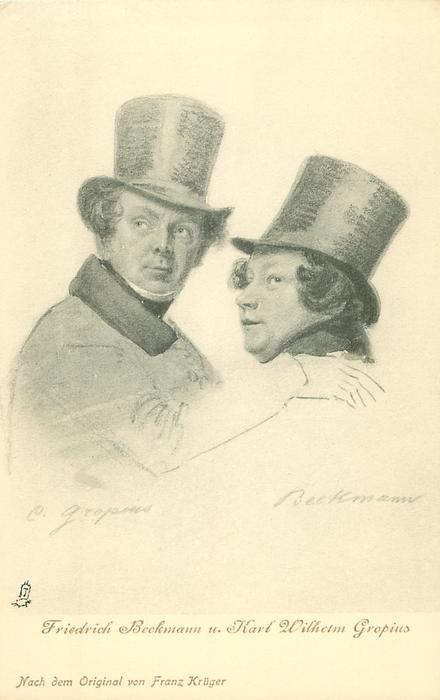
Karl Wilhelm Gropius (left) with the comic actor Friedrich Beckmann: a postcard by Franz Krüger

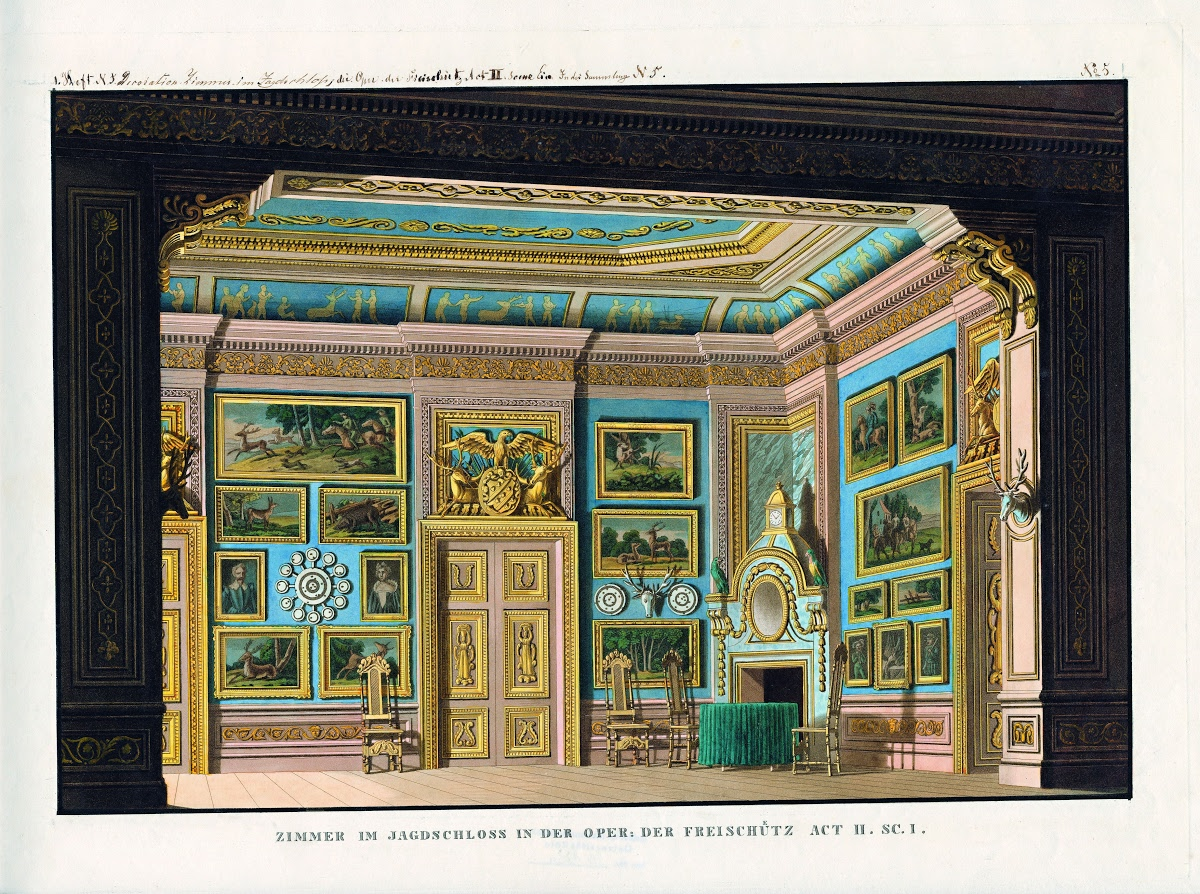
Set design for Der Freischütz, by Carl Maria von Weber

Karl Wilhelm Gropius, also Carl Wilhelm Gropius (4 April 1793 – 20 February 1870), was a German set painter and scenic artist, working in the theatres of Berlin. He was also a printmaker and seller and a prolific caricaturist.

== Life ==
Gropius was born in Braunschweig, the son of Wilhelm Ernst Gropius and his wife Lucie (née Graeffer). When he was still a child the family moved to Berlin where his father opened a mask factory and shop. After training under his father in his teens he travelled in Europe to broaden his artistic education. In Paris he became familiar with the diorama theatre invented by Louis Daguerre and Charles Marie Bouton. Returning to Berlin he trained under the artist and architect Karl Friedrich Schinkel as a landscape painter. From 1819 he worked as stage designer, artist and decorator for the Hoftheater (court theatre) and other Berlin theatres. In this capacity he designed inter alia the stage settings and backdrops for the premiere of Der Freischütz by Carl Maria von Weber which on 18 June 1821 opened the newly rebuilt Schauspielhaus Berlin, designed by his teacher Schinkel.

In Italy and Greece he had assembled a large collection of views, which he put to use in the diorama theatre, based on Daguerre's, which he opened with his brothers in 1827 in the Georgenstraße, Berlin, which together with the Gropius's adjacent shop for art publications became a great success.

He had many pupils, including Eduard Gaertner and Emil Roberg.

In 1822 Gropius was elected a member of the Prussian Academy of Arts.

In 1836 he opened a factory producing Steinpappe ("stone paper"), which was basically papier maché strengthened with glue and precipitated calcium carbonate (or precipitate chalk; Schwämmkreide). This set to a stonelike consistency that took gilding well and was extremely easy to shape and cut, and was thus ideal for Gropius' stage settings and interior decorations.

Gropius died in Berlin on 20 February 1870 and was buried in the Neue Dorotheenstädtische Friedhof.

== Family ==
In 1820 Gropius married Claudine Coste (1801–1827), with whom he had three children: Paul, who was also an artist and took over his father's businesses and succeeded him as the decorator and scenic artist in the Hoftheater; and two daughters, one of whom, Antonie, was the mother of the landscape artist Paul Flickel. By his second wife, Jeanette Judée (1775–1855), he had no children.
