= Svenskt biografiskt lexikon =

Swedish biographical dictionary

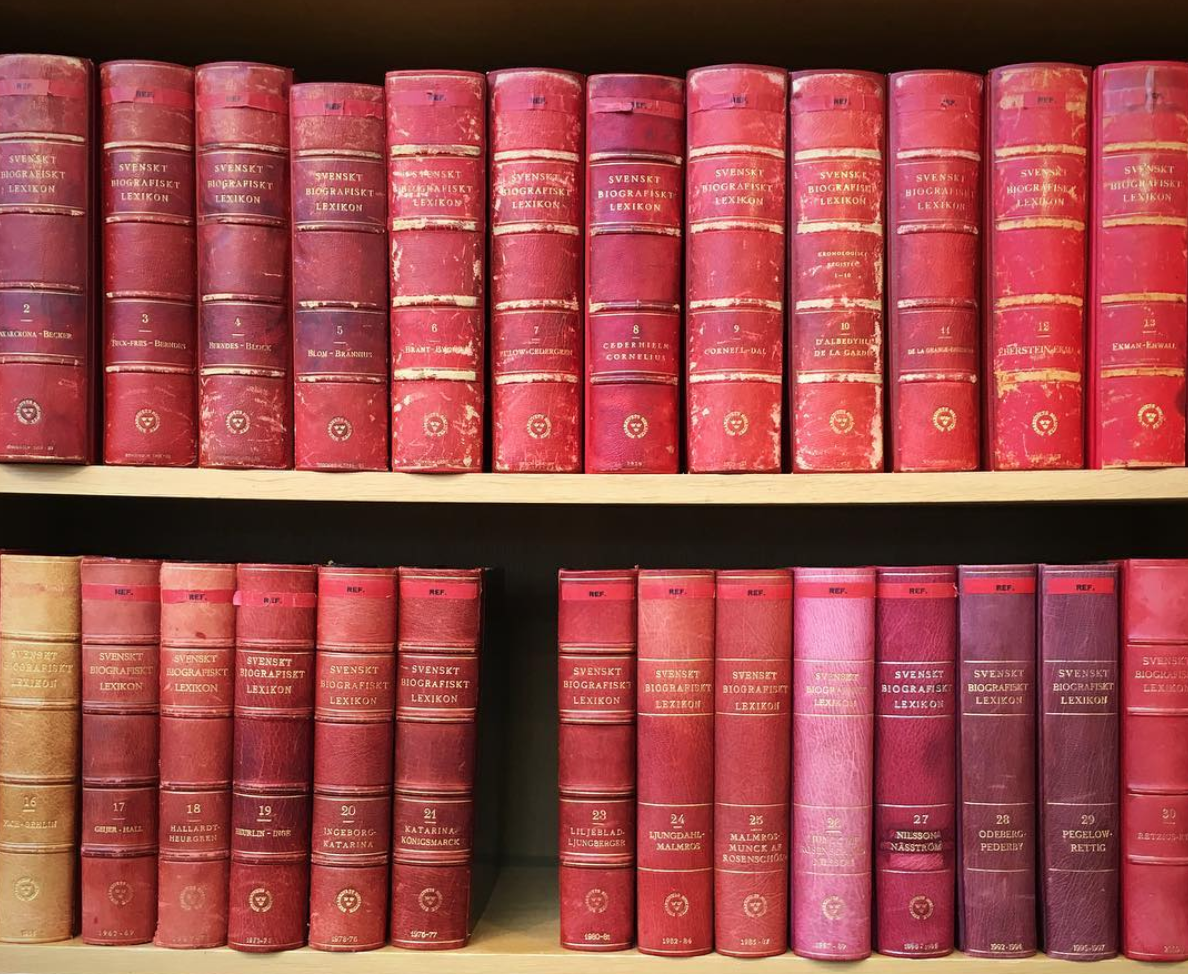
Svenskt biografiskt lexikon

Svenskt biografiskt lexikon (Swedish pronunciation: [ˈsvɛnːskt bɪʊˈɡrɑ̌ːfɪskt ˈlɛ̌ksɪkɔn], abbreviated SBL), in English Dictionary of Swedish National Biography, is a Swedish biographical dictionary, started in 1917. The first volume, covering names Abelin to Anjou, was published in 1918. As of 2026, names from A to S are covered in the published volumes.

Fewer than 10% of the entries are about women, prompting a related project focused on women (the National Biographical Dictionary of Swedish Women, Svenskt Kvinnobiografiskt lexikon [SKBL]).

== Volumes ==
1. Abelin – Anjou (1918)
2. Ankarcrona – Becker (1920)
3. Beck-Friis – Berndes (1922)
4. Berndes – Block (1924)
5. Blom – Brannius (1925)
6. Brant – Bygdén (1926)
7. Bülow – Cedergren (1927)
8. Cederhielm – Cornelius (1929)
9. Cornell – Dal (1931)
10. Díalbedyhll – De La Gardie (1931)
11. De La Grange – Ebersköld (1945)
12. Eberstein – Ekman (1949)
13. Ekman – Enwall (1950)
14. Envallsson – Fahlbeck (1953)
15. Fahlberg – Feuk (1956)
16. Fich – Gehlin (1964–1966)
17. Geijer – Hall (1967–1969)
18. Hallardt – Heurgren (1969–1971)
19. Heurlin – Inge (1971–1973)
20. Ingeborg – Katarina (1973–75)
21. Katarina – Königsmarck (1975–77)
22. Königsmarck – Lilja (1977–79)
23. Liljeblad – Ljungberger (1980–1981)
24. Ljungdahl – Malmros (1982–1984)
25. Malmros – Munck af Rosenschöld (1985–1987)
26. Munck af Rosenschöld – Nilsson (1987–1989)
27. Nilsson – Näsström (1990–1991)
28. Odeberg – Pederby (1992–1994)
29. Pegelow – Rettig (1995–1997)
30. Retzius – Ryd (1998–2000)
31. Rydbeck – Segerstedt (2000–2002)
32. Sehlstedt – Sparre (2003–2006)
33. Sparrgren – Ström (2007–2011)
34. Strömberg – Swensson (2013–2017)

== See also ==
- Svenskt biografiskt handlexikon
