= List of organ compositions by Johann Sebastian Bach =

Organ compositions by Johann Sebastian Bach refers to the compositions in the seventh chapter of the Bach-Werke-Verzeichnis (BWV, catalogue of Bach's compositions), or, in the New Bach Edition, the compositions in Series IV.

== Six Sonatas (BWV 525–530) ==
- BWV 525 – Sonata No. 1 in E♭ major
- BWV 526 – Sonata No. 2 in C minor
- BWV 527 – Sonata No. 3 in D minor
- BWV 528 – Sonata No. 4 in E minor
- BWV 529 – Sonata No. 5 in C major
- BWV 530 – Sonata No. 6 in G major

== In the form of a Prelude, Toccata, Fantasia, Passacaglia, middle movement and/or Fugue (BWV 531–582) ==
- BWV 531 – Prelude and Fugue in C major
- BWV 532 – Prelude and Fugue in D major
- BWV 532a – Fugue in D major (alternative version of the fugue of BWV 532)
- BWV 533 – Prelude and Fugue in E minor ("Cathedral")
- BWV 533a – Prelude and Fugue in E minor (alternative version of BWV 533 without pedals)
- BWV 534 – Prelude and Fugue in F minor (doubtful)
- BWV 535 – Prelude and Fugue in G minor
- BWV 535a – Prelude and Fugue in G minor (alternative version of BWV 535)
- BWV 536 – Prelude and Fugue in A major
- BWV 536a – Prelude and Fugue in A major (alternative version of BWV 536, possibly based on the original manuscript)
- BWV 537 – Fantasia and Fugue in C minor
- BWV 538 – Toccata and Fugue in D minor ("Dorian")
- BWV 539 – Prelude and Fugue in D minor ("Fiddle") (uncertain)
- BWV 539a – Fugue in D minor (see BWV 1000 for the lute arrangement, movement 2 of BWV 1001 for the violin arrangement)
- BWV 540 – Toccata and Fugue in F major
- BWV 541 – Prelude and Fugue in G major
- BWV 542 – Fantasia and Fugue in G minor ("Great")
- BWV 542a – Fugue in G minor (alternative version of the fugue from BWV 542)
- BWV 543 – Prelude and Fugue in A minor
- BWV 544 – Prelude and Fugue in B minor
- BWV 545 – Prelude and Fugue in C major
- BWV 545a – Prelude and Fugue in C major (alternative version of BWV 545)
- BWV 545b – Prelude, Trio and Fugue in B♭ major (alternative version of BWV 545; the Trio is an arrangement of the finale of BWV 1029; some parts possibly by Johann Tobias Krebs)
- BWV 546 – Prelude and Fugue in C minor
- BWV 547 – Prelude and Fugue in C major ("9/8")
- BWV 548 – Prelude and Fugue in E minor ("Wedge")
- BWV 549 – Prelude and Fugue in C minor
- BWV 550 – Prelude and Fugue in G major
- BWV 551 – Prelude and Fugue in A minor
- BWV 552 – Prelude and Fugue in E♭ major ("St. Anne") (part of Clavier-Übung III)
- BWV 553 – Eight Short Preludes and Fugues – Prelude and Fugue in C major (spurious, possibly by Johann Tobias Krebs)
- BWV 554 – Eight Short Preludes and Fugues – Prelude and Fugue in D minor (spurious, possibly by Johann Tobias Krebs)
- BWV 555 – Eight Short Preludes and Fugues – Prelude and Fugue in E minor (spurious, possibly by Johann Tobias Krebs)
- BWV 556 – Eight Short Preludes and Fugues – Prelude and Fugue in F major (spurious, possibly by Johann Tobias Krebs)
- BWV 557 – Eight Short Preludes and Fugues – Prelude and Fugue in G major (spurious, possibly by Johann Tobias Krebs)
- BWV 558 – Eight Short Preludes and Fugues – Prelude and Fugue in G minor (spurious, possibly by Johann Tobias Krebs)
- BWV 559 – Eight Short Preludes and Fugues – Prelude and Fugue in A minor (spurious, possibly by Johann Tobias Krebs)
- BWV 560 – Eight Short Preludes and Fugues – Prelude and Fugue in B♭ major (spurious, possibly by Johann Tobias Krebs)
- BWV 561 – Fantasia and Fugue in A minor (spurious, possibly by Johann Christian Kittel)
- BWV 562 – Fantasia and Fugue in C minor (fugue unfinished)
- BWV 563 – Fantasia in B minor (Fantasia and Imitatio) (spurious)
- BWV 564 – Toccata, Adagio and Fugue in C major
- BWV 565 – Toccata and Fugue in D minor
- BWV 566 – Toccata and Fugue in E major (also published in C major)
- BWV 566a – Toccata in E major (earlier version of BWV 566)
- BWV 567 – Prelude in C major (possibly by Johann Ludwig Krebs)
- BWV 568 – Prelude in G major (doubtful)
- BWV 569 – Prelude in A minor
- BWV 570 – Fantasia in C major
- BWV 571 – Fantasia (Concerto) in G major (spurious)
- BWV 572 – Fantasia in G major (Pièce d'Orgue)
- BWV 573 – Fantasia in C major (incomplete, from the 1722 Notebook for Anna Magdalena Bach)
- BWV 574 – Fugue in C minor (on a theme of Legrenzi)
- BWV 574a – Fugue in C minor (alternative version of BWV 574)
- BWV 574b – Fugue in C minor (alternative version of BWV 574)
- BWV 575 – Fugue in C minor
- BWV 576 – Fugue in G major (doubtful)
- BWV 577 – Fugue in G major à la Gigue (doubtful)
- BWV 578 – Fugue in G minor ("Little")
- BWV 579 – Fugue in B minor (on a theme by Corelli, from Op. 3, No. 4)
- BWV 580 – Fugue in D major (doubtful)
- BWV 581 – Fugue in G major (not by Bach, composed by Gottfried August Homilius)
- BWV 582 – Passacaglia and Fugue in C minor

== Trios (BWV 583–586) ==
- BWV 583 – Trio in D minor (spurious, possibly a transcription of a chamber trio by another composer)
- BWV 584 – Trio in G minor (spurious, a version of BWV 166/2 or another, lost, aria)
- BWV 585 – Trio in C minor (spurious, after Johann Friedrich Fasch)
- BWV 586 – Trio in G major (spurious, possibly after Georg Philipp Telemann)

== Miscellaneous pieces (BWV 587–591) ==
- BWV 587 – Aria in F major (spurious, after François Couperin)
- BWV 588 – Canzona in D minor
- BWV 589 – Allabreve in D major
- BWV 590 – Pastorella in F major (first movement probably incomplete)
- BWV 591 – Little Harmonic Labyrinth (Kleines harmonisches Labyrinth) (spurious, possibly by Johann David Heinichen)

== Concertos (BWV 592–597) ==
- BWV 592 – Concerto in G major (after a concerto by Prince Johann Ernst of Saxe-Weimar)
- BWV 592a – Concerto in G major (an arrangement of BWV 592 for harpsichord)
- BWV 593 – Concerto in A minor (after Antonio Vivaldi's Concerto for two violins, Op. 3 No. 8, RV 522)
- BWV 594 – Concerto in C major (after Antonio Vivaldi's Grosso mogul violin concerto, RV 208)
- BWV 595 – Concerto in C major (after a concerto by Prince Johann Ernst of Saxe-Weimar)
- BWV 596 – Concerto in D minor (after Antonio Vivaldi's Concerto for two violins and cello, Op. 3 No. 11, RV 565)
- BWV 597 – Concerto in E♭ major (doubtful)

== Pedal exercise (BWV 598) ==
- BWV 598 – Pedal-Exercitium ("Pedal Exercise") in G minor (fragment, authorship uncertain, presumably by Carl Philipp Emanuel Bach)

== Chorale Preludes ==
Traditionally known as chorale preludes, the compositions in the BWV 599–771 range of the Bach-Werke-Verzeichnis, and later additions BWV 1085, 1090–1120 (Neumeister Chorales) and 1128, are also indicated as chorale settings for organ, and include multi-movement chorale partitas and sets of variations.

Legend to the table
column		content	links to
1	Name	Name of the chorale prelude, by J. S. Bach unless otherwise indicated	Work page at Bach Digital website
2	BWV	Number of the composition in the Bach-Werke-Verzeichnis	Description of the chorale prelude
3	Zahn	Zahn number of the hymn tune used in the chorale prelude.	Description of the Lutheran hymn or tune
4	Other	Works by Bach, other than chorale preludes, using the same hymn tune	Description of the related composition

Usage of hymn tunes in Bach's chorale preludes
Name	BWV	Zahn	Other
Ach bleib bei uns, Herr Jesu Christ	649	493	BWV 6/3, 253, 414
Ach Gott, tu dich erbarmen	1109	7228c	—
Ach Gott und Herr	714	2050, 2052	BWV 48/3, 255
Ach Gott, vom Himmel sieh darein	741	4431	BWV 2, 77/6, 153/1
Ach, was ist doch unser Leben	743	1208b	—
Ach, was soll ich Sünder machen	770	3574	BWV 259
Ach wie nichtig, ach wie flüchtig	644	1887b	BWV 26
Allein Gott in der Höh sei Ehr	662	4457	BWV 85/3, 104/6, 112, 128/1, 260
Allein Gott in der Höh sei Ehr	662a	4457	BWV 85/3, 104/6, 112, 128/1, 260
Allein Gott in der Höh sei Ehr	663	4457	BWV 85/3, 104/6, 112, 128/1, 260
Allein Gott in der Höh sei Ehr	663a	4457	BWV 85/3, 104/6, 112, 128/1, 260
Allein Gott in der Höh sei Ehr	664	4457	BWV 85/3, 104/6, 112, 128/1, 260
Allein Gott in der Höh sei Ehr	664a	4457	BWV 85/3, 104/6, 112, 128/1, 260
Allein Gott in der Höh sei Ehr	664b	4457	BWV 85/3, 104/6, 112, 128/1, 260
Allein Gott in der Höh sei Ehr	675	4457	BWV 85/3, 104/6, 112, 128/1, 260
Allein Gott in der Höh sei Ehr	676	4457	BWV 85/3, 104/6, 112, 128/1, 260
Allein Gott in der Höh sei Ehr	677	4457	BWV 85/3, 104/6, 112, 128/1, 260
Allein Gott in der Höh sei Ehr	711	4457	BWV 85/3, 104/6, 112, 128/1, 260
Allein Gott in der Höh sei Ehr	715	4457	BWV 85/3, 104/6, 112, 128/1, 260
Allein Gott in der Höh sei Ehr	716	4457	BWV 85/3, 104/6, 112, 128/1, 260
Allein Gott in der Höh sei Ehr	717	4457	BWV 85/3, 104/6, 112, 128/1, 260
Allein zu dir, Herr Jesu Christ	1100	7292b	BWV 33, 261
Alle Menschen müssen sterben	643	6779a	—
Alle Menschen müssen sterben	1117	6779a	—
Jesu, der du meine Seele	752	6779a	—
Als Jesus Christus in der Nacht	1108	258	BWV 265
An Wasserflüssen Babylon	653	7663	BWV 267
An Wasserflüssen Babylon	653a	7663	BWV 267
An Wasserflüssen Babylon	653b	7663	BWV 267
Auf meinen lieben Gott by J. L. Krebs	744	2164	BWV 5, 89/6, 136/6, 148/6, 188/6
Wo soll ich fliehen hin	646	2164	BWV 5, 89/6, 136/6, 148/6, 188/6
Wo soll ich fliehen hin	694	2164	BWV 5, 89/6, 136/6, 148/6, 188/6
Aus der Tiefe rufe ich by C. P. E. Bach?	745	1217	—
Aus tiefer Not schrei ich zu dir	686	4437	BWV 38
Aus tiefer Not schrei ich zu dir	687	4437	BWV 38
Aus tiefer Not schrei ich zu dir	1099	4438	BWV 156/6, 339
Christ, der du bist der helle Tag	766	384	BWV 273
Christ, der du bist der helle Tag	1120	384	BWV 273
Christe, du Lamm Gottes	619	58	BWV 23/4, 233a
Christ ist erstanden	627	8584	BWV 66/6, 276
Christ lag in Todesbanden	625	7012a	BWV 4, 158/4, 277, 278, 279
Christ lag in Todesbanden	695	7012a	BWV 4, 158/4, 277, 278, 279
Christ lag in Todesbanden	695a	7012a	BWV 4, 158/4, 277, 278, 279
Christ lag in Todesbanden	718	7012a	BWV 4, 158/4, 277, 278, 279
Christum wir sollen loben schon	611	297c	BWV 121
Christum wir sollen loben schon	696	297c	BWV 121
Christ unser Herr zum Jordan kam	684	7246	BWV 7, 176/6 280
Christ unser Herr zum Jordan kam	685	7246	BWV 7, 176/6 280
Christus, der ist mein Leben	1112	132	BWV 95/1, 281, 282
Christus, der uns selig macht	620	6283b	BWV 245/15/37, 283, 1084
Christus, der uns selig macht	620a	6283b	BWV 245/15/37, 283, 1084
Christus, der uns selig macht	747	6283b	BWV 245/15/37, 283, 1084
Da Jesus an dem Kreuze stund	621	1706	BWV 1089
Das alte Jahr vergangen ist	614	381c	BWV 288, 289
Das alte Jahr vergangen ist	1091	381c	BWV 288, 289
Das Jesulein soll doch mein Trost	702	7597	—
Der Tag, der ist so freudenreich	605	7870	BWV 294
Der Tag, der ist so freudenreich	719	7870	BWV 294
Dies sind die heilgen zehn Gebot	635	1951	BWV 298
Dies sind die heiligen zehen Gebot	678	1951	BWV 298
Dies sind die heiligen zehen Gebot	679	1951	BWV 298
Du Friedefürst, Herr Jesu Christ	1102	4373	BWV 67/7, 116, 143/2/7
Durch Adams Fall ist ganz verderbt	637	7549	BWV 18/5, 109/6
Durch Adams Fall ist ganz verderbt	705	7549	BWV 18/5, 109/6
Durch Adams Fall ist ganz verderbt	1101	7549	BWV 18/5, 109/6
Ehre sei dir Christe, der du leidest Not	1097	8187h	BWV 407
Ein feste Burg ist ... by J. Mich. Bach?	720	7377	BWV 80, 302, 303
Erbarm dich mein, o Herre Gott	721	5851	BWV 305
Erhalt uns Herr, bei deinem Wort	1103	350	BWV 6/6, 126
Erschienen ist der herrliche Tag	629	1743	BWV 67/4, 145/5
Erstanden ist der heilge Christ	628	1747a	—
Es ist das Heil uns kommen her	638	4430	BWV 9, 86/6, 117, 186/6/11, 251
Es ist das Heil uns kommen her	638a	4430	BWV 9, 86/6, 117, 186/6/11, 251
Gelobet seist du, Jesu Christ	604	1947	BWV 64/2, 91, 248/7/28, 314
Gelobet seist du, Jesu Christ	697	1947	BWV 64/2, 91, 248/7/28, 314
Gelobet seist du, Jesu Christ	722	1947	BWV 64/2, 91, 248/7/28, 314
Gelobet seist du, Jesu Christ	722a	1947	BWV 64/2, 91, 248/7/28, 314
Gelobet seist du, ... by J. Mich. Bach?	723	1947	BWV 64/2, 91, 248/7/28, 314
Gott durch deine Güte	600	3294	BWV 318
Gottes Sohn ist kommen	703	3294	BWV 318
Gott durch deine Güte	724	3294	BWV 318
Gott ist mein Heil, mein Hilf und Trost	1106	4421	—
Helft mir Gotts Güte preisen	613	5267	BWV 16/6, 28/6, 183/6
Herr Christ, der ein'ge Gottes Sohn	601	4297a	BWV 22/5, 96, (132/6), 164/4
Herr Christ, der ein'ge Gottes Sohn	698	4297a	BWV 22/5, 96, (132/6), 164/4
Herr Gott, dich loben wir	725	8652	BWV 16/1, 119/9, 120/6, 190/1/2, 328
Herr Gott, nun schleuß den Himmel ...	617	7641b	—
Herr Gott, nun schleuß den Himmel ...	1092	7641b	—
Herr Jesu Christ, dich zu uns wend	632	624	BWV 332
Herr Jesu Christ, dich zu uns wend	655	624	BWV 332
Herr Jesu Christ, dich zu uns wend	655(1)	624	BWV 332
Herr Jesu Christ, dich zu uns wend	655(2)	624	BWV 332
Herr Jesu Christ, dich zu uns wend	655(3)	624	BWV 332
Herr Jesu Christ, dich zu uns wend	655(4)	624	BWV 332
Herr Jesu Christ, dich zu uns wend	655a	624	BWV 332
Herr Jesu Christ, dich zu uns wend	655b	624	BWV 332
Herr Jesu Christ, dich zu uns wend	655c	624	BWV 332
Herr Jesu Christ, dich zu uns wend	709	624	BWV 332
Herr Jesu Christ, dich zu uns wend	726	624	BWV 332
Herr Jesu Christ, dich zu uns wend	749	624	BWV 332
Herr Jesu Christ, du höchstes Gut	1114	4486	BWV 48/7, 113, 131/2/4, 166/3, 168/6, 334
Herzlich lieb hab ich dich, o Herr	1115	8326	BWV 149/7, 174/5, 245/40, 340
Herzlich tut mich verlangen	727	5385a	BWV 135, 153/5, 159/2, 161/6, 244/15/17/44/54/62, 248/5/64, 270, 271
Ach Herr, mich armen Sünder	742	5385a	BWV 135, 153/5, 159/2, 161/6, 244/15/17/44/54/62, 248/5/64, 270, 271
Herzliebster Jesu, was hast du ...	1093	983	BWV 244/3/19/46, 245/3/17
Heut triumphieret Gottes Sohn	630	2585	BWV 342
Heut triumphieret Gottes Sohn	630a	2585	BWV 342
Hilf Gott, dass mir's gelinge	624	4329	BWV 343
Ich hab mein Sach Gott heimgestellt	707	1679	BWV 351
Ich hab mein Sach Gott heimgestellt	708	1679	BWV 351
Ich hab mein Sach Gott heimgestellt	708a	1679	BWV 351
Ich hab mein Sach Gott heimgestellt	1113	1679	BWV 351
Ich ruf zu dir, Herr Jesu Christ	639	7400	BWV 177, 185/6
In dich hab ich gehoffet, Herr	640	2459	—
In dich hab ich gehoffet, Herr	712	2461	BWV 52/6, 106/4, 244/32, 248/46
In dir ist Freude	615	8537	—
In dulci jubilo	608	4947	BWV 368
In dulci jubilo	729	4947	BWV 368
In dulci jubilo	729a	4947	BWV 368
Jesu, meine Freude	610	8032	BWV 64/8, 81/7, 87/7, 227, 358
Jesu, meine Freude	713	8032	BWV 64/8, 81/7, 87/7, 227, 358
Jesu, meine Freude	713a	8032	BWV 64/8, 81/7, 87/7, 227, 358
Jesu, meine Freude	753	8032	BWV 64/8, 81/7, 87/7, 227, 358
Jesu, meine Freude	1105	8032	BWV 64/8, 81/7, 87/7, 227, 358
Jesu, meines Lebens Leben	1107	6794	—
Jesus Christus, unser Heiland, der d...	626	1978	BWV 364
Jesus Christus, unser Heiland	665	1576	BWV 363
Jesus Christus, unser Heiland	665a	1576	BWV 363
Jesus Christus, unser Heiland	666	1576	BWV 363
Jesus Christus, unser Heiland	666a	1576	BWV 363
Jesus Christus, unser Heiland, der v...	688	1576	BWV 363
Jesus Christus, unser Heiland	689	1576	BWV 363
Jesus, meine Zuversicht	728	3432b	BWV 145/a, 365
Komm, Gott Schöpfer, heiliger Geist	631	295	BWV 370
Komm, Gott Schöpfer, heiliger Geist	631a	295	BWV 370
Komm, Gott Schöpfer, heiliger Geist	667	295	BWV 370
Komm, Gott Schöpfer, heiliger Geist	667a	295	BWV 370
Komm, Gott Schöpfer, heiliger Geist	667b	295	BWV 370
Komm, heiliger Geist, Herre Gott	651	7445a	BWV 59/3, 175/7, 226
Komm, heiliger Geist, Herre Gott	651a	7445a	BWV 59/3, 175/7, 226
Komm, heiliger Geist, Herre Gott	652	7445a	BWV 59/3, 175/7, 226
Komm, heiliger Geist, Herre Gott	652a	7445a	BWV 59/3, 175/7, 226
Kommst du nun, Jesu, vom Himmel ...	650	1912a	BWV 57/8, 120/8, 137
Kyrie, Gott Vater in Ewigkeit	669	8600	BWV 371
Christe, aller Welt Trost	670	8600	BWV 371
Kyrie, Gott heiliger Geist	671	8600	BWV 371
Kyrie, Gott Vater in Ewigkeit	672	8600	BWV 371
Christe, aller Welt Trost	673	8600	BWV 371
Kyrie, Gott heiliger Geist	674	8600	BWV 371
Liebster Jesu, wir sind hier	633	3498b	BWV 373
Liebster Jesu, wir sind hier	634	3498b	BWV 373
Liebster Jesu, wir sind hier	706	3498b	BWV 373
Liebster Jesu, wir sind hier	730	3498b	BWV 373
Liebster Jesu, wir sind hier	731	3498b	BWV 373
Liebster Jesu, wir sind ... by J. S. Bach?	754	3498b	BWV 373
Lob sei dem allmächtigen Gott	602	339	—
Lob sei dem allmächtigen Gott	704	339	—
Lobt Gott, ihr Christen allzugleich	609	198	BWV 151/5, 195/6, 375, 376
Lobt Gott, ihr Christen allzugleich	732	198	BWV 151/5, 195/6, 375, 376
Lobt Gott, ihr Christen allzugleich	732a	198	BWV 151/5, 195/6, 375, 376
Machs mit mir, Gott, nach deiner Güt	957	2383	BWV 139, 156/2, 245/22, 377
Meine Seele erhebt den Herren	648	(9th tone)	BWV 10, 323, 324
Meine Seele erhebt ... by J. L. Krebs?	733	(9th tone)	BWV 10, 323, 324
Mit Fried und Freud ich fahr dahin	616	3986	BWV 83/5, 95/1, 106/3b, 125, 382
Nun danket alle Gott	657	5142	BWV 79/3, 192, 252, 386
Nun freut euch, lieben Christen g'mein	755	4427	BWV 388
Nun freut euch, lieben Christen g'mein	734	4429a	BWV 248/59, 307
Es ist gewisslich an ... arr. by J. S. Bach?	734a	4429a	BWV 248/59, 307
Nun komm, der Heiden Heiland	599	1174	BWV 36/2/6/8, 61/1, 62
Nun komm, der Heiden Heiland	659	1174	BWV 36/2/6/8, 61/1, 62
Nun komm, der Heiden Heiland	659a	1174	BWV 36/2/6/8, 61/1, 62
Nun komm, der Heiden Heiland	660	1174	BWV 36/2/6/8, 61/1, 62
Nun komm, der Heiden Heiland	660a	1174	BWV 36/2/6/8, 61/1, 62
Nun komm, der H... arr. by J. T. Krebs?	660b	1174	BWV 36/2/6/8, 61/1, 62
Nun komm, der Heiden Heiland	661	1174	BWV 36/2/6/8, 61/1, 62
Nun komm, der Heiden Heiland	661a	1174	BWV 36/2/6/8, 61/1, 62
Nun komm, der Heiden Heiland	699	1174	BWV 36/2/6/8, 61/1, 62
Nun lasset uns den Leib begraben	1111	352	—
Nun ruhen alle Wälder	756	2293b	BWV 13/6, 44/7, 97, 244/10/37, 245/11, 392, 393, 394, 395
O Gott, du frommer Gott	767	5138	BWV 465
O Herre Gott, dein göttlichs Wort	757	5690	BWV 184/5
O Herre Gott, dein göttlich Wort	1110	5690	BWV 184/5
O Jesu, wie ist dein Gestalt	1094	8360	—
O Lamm Gottes, unschuldig	618	4361a	BWV 244/1, 401
O Lamm Gottes unschuldig	1095	4361a	BWV 244/1, 401
O Lamm Gottes, unschuldig	656	4361b	—
O Lamm Gottes, unschuldig	656a	4361b	—
O Lamm Gottes unschuldig	1085	4361b	—
O Mensch, bewein dein Sünde groß	622	8303	BWV 244/29, 402
O Mensch, bewein dein Sünde groß	622(v)	8303	BWV 244/29, 402
O Traurigkeit, o Herzeleid	Anh200	1915	BWV 404
O Vater, allmächtiger Gott	758	8603b	—
Puer natus in Bethlehem	603	192b	BWV 65/2
Schmücke dich, o liebe Seele	654	6923	BWV 180
Schmücke dich, o liebe Seele	654a	6923	BWV 180
Sei gegrüßet, Jesu gütig	768	3889b	BWV 410, 499
Valet will ich dir geben	735	5404a	BWV 95/3, 245/26, 415
Valet will ich dir geben	735a	5404a	BWV 95/3, 245/26, 415
Valet will ich dir geben	736	5404a	BWV 95/3, 245/26, 415
Vater unser im Himmelreich	636	2561	BWV 90/5, 101, 102/7, 245/5, 416
Vater unser im Himmelreich	682	2561	BWV 90/5, 101, 102/7, 245/5, 416
Vater unser im Himmelreich	683	2561	BWV 90/5, 101, 102/7, 245/5, 416
Vater unser im ... arr. by J. S. Bach?	683a	2561	BWV 90/5, 101, 102/7, 245/5, 416
Vater unser im Himmelreich	737	2561	BWV 90/5, 101, 102/7, 245/5, 416
Vater unser im Himmelreich	762	2561	BWV 90/5, 101, 102/7, 245/5, 416
Vom Himmel hoch, da komm ich her	606	346	BWV 243a/A, 248/9/17/23
Vom Himmel hoch, da komm ich her	700	346	BWV 243a/A, 248/9/17/23
Vom Himmel hoch, da komm ich her	701	346	BWV 243a/A, 248/9/17/23
Vom Himmel hoch, da komm ich her	738	346	BWV 243a/A, 248/9/17/23
Vom Himmel hoch, da komm ich her	738a	346	BWV 243a/A, 248/9/17/23
Vom Himmel hoch da komm ich her	769	346	BWV 243a/A, 248/9/17/23
Vom Himmel hoch da komm ich her	769a	346	BWV 243a/A, 248/9/17/23
Vom Himmel kam der Engel Schar	607	192a	—
Von Gott will ich nicht lassen	658	5264b	BWV 11/9, 73/5, 107, 417, 418, 419
Von Gott will ich nicht lassen	658a	5264b	BWV 11/9, 73/5, 107, 417, 418, 419
Wachet auf, ruft uns die Stimme	645	8405	BWV 140
Was Gott tut, das ist wohlgetan	1116	5629	BWV 12/7, 69a/6, 75/7/14, 98/1, 99, 100, 144/3, 250
Wenn dich Unglück tut greifen an	1104	499	—
Wenn wir in höchsten Nöten sein	641	394	BWV 431, 432
Vor deinen Thron tret ich hiermit	668	394	BWV 431, 432
Wenn wir in höchsten Nöten	668a	394	BWV 431, 432
Werde munter, mein Gemüte	1118	6551	BWV 55/5, 146/8, 154/3, 244/40, 359, 360
Wer nur den lieben Gott lässt walten	642	2778	BWV 21/9, 27/1, 84/5, 88/7, 93, 166/6, 179/6, 197/10, 434
Wer nur den lieben Gott lässt walten	647	2778	BWV 21/9, 27/1, 84/5, 88/7, 93, 166/6, 179/6, 197/10, 434
Wer nur den lieben Gott lässt walten	690	2778	BWV 21/9, 27/1, 84/5, 88/7, 93, 166/6, 179/6, 197/10, 434
Wer nur den lieben Gott lässt walten	691	2778	BWV 21/9, 27/1, 84/5, 88/7, 93, 166/6, 179/6, 197/10, 434
Wer nur den lieben Gott lässt walten	691a	2778	BWV 21/9, 27/1, 84/5, 88/7, 93, 166/6, 179/6, 197/10, 434
Wie nach einer Wasserquelle	1119	1294	—
Wie schön leuchtet der Morgenstern	739	8359	BWV 1, 36/4/5, 37/3, 49/6, 61/6, 172/6, 436
Wie schön leucht uns der Morgenstern	763	8359	BWV 1, 36/4/5, 37/3, 49/6, 61/6, 172/6, 436
Wie schön leuchtet der Morgenstern	764	8359	BWV 1, 36/4/5, 37/3, 49/6, 61/6, 172/6, 436
Wir Christenleut	612	2072	BWV 40/3, 110/7, 248/35
Wir Christenleut habn jetzund Freud	710	2072	BWV 40/3, 110/7, 248/35
Wir Christenleut	1090	2072	BWV 40/3, 110/7, 248/35
Wir danken dir, Herr Jesu Christ	623	423	BWV 336
Wir gläuben all an einen Gott	680	7971	BWV 437
Wir gläuben all an einen Gott	681	7971	BWV 437
Wir glauben all an einen Gott	765	7971	BWV 437
Wir glauben all an einen Gott	1098	7971	BWV 437
Wir glauben all ... by J. L. Krebs?	740	4000	—
Wo Gott der Herr nicht bei uns hält	1128	4441a	BWV 73/1, 114, 178, 256, 257, 258

=== Orgelbüchlein (Little Organ Book, BWV 599–644) ===
The Orgelbüchlein contains 46 chorale preludes, and a fragment (BWV Anh. 200).

- Advent
1. BWV 599 – Nun komm, der Heiden Heiland
2. BWV 600 – Gott durch deine Güte (or) Gottes Sohn ist kommen
3. BWV 601 – Herr Christ, der ein'ge Gottes Sohn (or) Herr Gott, nun sei gepreiset (also in the Neumeister Collection)
4. BWV 602 – Lob sei dem allmächtigen Gott
- Christmas
5. BWV 603 – Puer natus in Bethlehem
6. BWV 604 – Gelobet seist du, Jesu Christ
7. BWV 605 – Der Tag, der ist so freudenreich
8. BWV 606 – Vom Himmel hoch, da komm ich her
9. BWV 607 – Vom Himmel kam der Engel Schar
10. BWV 608 – In dulci jubilo
11. BWV 609 – Lobt Gott, ihr Christen, allzugleich
12. BWV 610 – Jesu, meine Freude
13. BWV 611 – Christum wir sollen loben schon
14. BWV 612 – Wir Christenleut'
- New Year
15. BWV 613 – Helft mir Gottes Güte preisen
16. BWV 614 – Das alte Jahr vergangen ist
17. BWV 615 – In dir ist Freude
- Epiphany
18. BWV 616 – Mit Fried und Freud ich fahr dahin
19. BWV 617 – Herr Gott, nun schleuß den Himmel auf
- Lent
20. BWV 618 – O Lamm Gottes, unschuldig
21. BWV 619 – Christe, du Lamm Gottes
22. BWV 620 – Christus, der uns selig macht
  BWV 620a – Christus, der uns selig macht (older version)
23. BWV 621 – Da Jesus an dem Kreuze stund
24. BWV 622 – O Mensch, bewein dein Sünde groß
25. BWV 623 – Wir danken dir, Herr Jesu Christ
26. BWV 624 – Hilf Gott, daß mir's gelinge
- Easter
27. BWV 625 – Christ lag in Todesbanden
28. BWV 626 – Jesus Christus, unser Heiland, der den Tod überwand
29. BWV 627 – Christ ist erstanden
30. BWV 628 – Erstanden ist der heil'ge Christ
31. BWV 629 – Erschienen ist der herrliche Tag
32. BWV 630 – Heut triumphieret Gottes Sohn
  BWV 630a – Heut triumphieret Gottes Sohn (older version)
- Pentecost
33. BWV 631 – Komm, Gott Schöpfer, Heiliger Geist
  BWV 631a – Komm, Gott Schöpfer, Heiliger Geist (older version)
34. BWV 632 – Herr Jesu Christ, dich zu uns wend'
35. BWV 634 – Liebster Jesu, wir sind hier (earlier version of BWV 633)
36. BWV 633 – Liebster Jesu, wir sind hier
- Catechism hymns
37. BWV 635 – Dies sind die heil'gen zehn Gebot'
38. BWV 636 – Vater unser im Himmelreich
39. BWV 637 – Durch Adams Fall ist ganz verderbt
40. BWV 638 – Es ist das Heil uns kommen her
  BWV 638a – Es ist das Heil uns kommen her (older version)
- Miscellaneous
41. BWV 639 – Ich ruf zu dir, Herr Jesu Christ (also in the Neumeister Collection)
42. BWV 640 – In dich hab ich gehoffet, Herr
43. BWV 641 – Wenn wir in höchsten Nöten sein
44. BWV 642 – Wer nur den lieben Gott läßt walten
45. BWV 643 – Alle Menschen müssen sterben
46. BWV 644 – Ach wie nichtig, ach wie flüchtig

=== Schübler Chorales (BWV 645–650) ===
Most of the Schübler Chorales, which were published around 1748 as Sechs Chorale von verschiedener Art (Six Chorales of Various Kinds), are transcriptions of extant cantata movements:

1. BWV 645 – Wachet auf, ruft uns die Stimme
2. BWV 646 – Wo soll ich fliehen hin (or) Auf meinen lieben Gott
3. BWV 647 – Wer nur den lieben Gott läßt walten
4. BWV 648 – Meine Seele erhebt den Herren
5. BWV 649 – Ach, bleib bei uns, Herr Jesu Christ
6. BWV 650 – Kommst du nun, Jesu, vom Himmel herunter

=== Great Eighteen Chorale Preludes, a.k.a. Leipzig Chorales (BWV 651–668) ===
1. BWV 651 – Fantasia super: Komm, Heiliger Geist, Herre Gott
  BWV 651a – Fantasia (Präludium) super: Komm, Heiliger Geist, Herre Gott (ältere, Weimarer Fassung)
2. BWV 652 – Komm, Heiliger Geist, Herre Gott
  BWV 652a – Komm, Heiliger Geist, Herre Gott (ältere, Weimarer Fassung)
3. BWV 653 – An Wasserflüssen Babylon
  BWV 653a – An Wasserflüssen Babylon alio modo a 4 (ältere, Weimarer Fassung)
  BWV 653b – An Wasserflüssen Babylon (Weimarer Urfassung)
4. BWV 654 – Schmücke dich, o liebe Seele
  BWV 654a – Schmücke dich, o liebe Seele (ältere, Weimarer Fassung)
5. BWV 655 – Trio super: Herr Jesu Christ, dich zu uns wend
  BWV 655a – Trio super: Herr Jesu Christ, dich zu uns wend (ältere, Weimarer Fassung)
  BWV 655b – Herr Jesu Christ, dich zu uns wend
  BWV 655c – Herr Jesu Christ, dich zu uns wend
6. BWV 656 – O Lamm Gottes, unschuldig
  BWV 656a – O Lamm Gottes, unschuldig (ältere, Weimarer Fassung)
7. BWV 657 – Nun danket alle Gott (Leuthen Chorale) (ältere Weimarer und Leipziger Fassung)
8. BWV 658 – Von Gott will ich nicht lassen
  BWV 658a – Fantasia super: Von Gott will ich nicht lassen (ältere, Weimarer Fassung)
9. BWV 659 – Nun komm, der Heiden Heiland
  BWV 659a – Fantasia super: Nun komm, der Heiden Heiland (ältere, Weimarer Fassung)
10. BWV 660 – Trio super: Nun komm, der Heiden Heiland
  BWV 660a – Nun komm, der Heiden Heiland (ältere, Weimarer Fassung)
  BWV 660b – Nun komm, der Heiden Heiland
11. BWV 661 – Nun komm, der Heiden Heiland
  BWV 661a – Nun komm, der Heiden Heiland (ältere, Weimarer Fassung)
12. BWV 662 – Allein Gott in der Höh' sei Ehr'
  BWV 662a – Allein Gott in der Höh' sei Ehr' (ältere, Weimarer Fassung)
13. BWV 663 – Allein Gott in der Höh' sei Ehr'
  BWV 663a – Allein Gott in der Höh' sei Ehr' (ältere, Weimarer Fassung)
14. BWV 664 – Trio super: Allein Gott in der Höh' sei Ehr'
  BWV 664a/b – Trio super: Allein Gott in der Höh' sei Ehr' (ältere Weimarer Fassung/Entwurf)
15. BWV 665 – Jesus Christus, unser Heiland
  BWV 665a – Jesus Christus, unser Heiland (in organo pleno) (ältere, Weimarer Fassung)
16. BWV 666 – Jesus Christus, unser Heiland (alio modo)
  BWV 666a – Jesus Christus, unser Heiland (ältere, Weimarer Fassung)
17. BWV 667 – Komm, Gott Schöpfer, heiliger Geist
  BWV 667a/b – Komm, Gott Schöpfer, heiliger Geist (ältere, Weimarer Fassungen)
18. BWV 668 – Vor deinen Thron tret' ich (Fragment)
  BWV 668a – Wenn wir in höchsten Nöten sein (Diktatschrift: Fragment)

=== Chorale preludes in Clavier-Übung III (BWV 669–689) ===
- Kyrie (three stanzas of "Kyrie, Gott Vater in Ewigkeit"):
  - Two manuals and pedals:
    BWV 669 – Kyrie, Gott Vater in Ewigkeit
    BWV 670 – Christe, aller Welt Trost
    BWV 671 – Kyrie, Gott heiliger Geist
  - Manuals only:
    BWV 672 – Kyrie, Gott Vater in Ewigkeit
    BWV 673 – Christe, aller Welt Trost
    BWV 674 – Kyrie, Gott heiliger Geist
- "Allein Gott in der Höh' sei Ehr'" (Gloria):
  - BWV 675 – Allein Gott in der Höh sei Ehr
  - BWV 676 – Allein Gott in der Höh sei Ehr
    BWV 676a – Allein Gott in der Höh sei Ehr (simplified variant of BWV 676: doubtful arrangement)
  - BWV 677 – Fughetta super: Allein Gott in der Höh sei Ehr (manuals only)
- "Dies sind die heilgen zehn Gebot" (Ten Commandments):
  - BWV 678 – Dies sind die heiligen zehen Gebot
  - BWV 679 – Fughetta super: Dies sind die heiligen zehen Gebot (manuals only)
- "Wir glauben all an einen Gott" (Credo):
  - BWV 680 – Wir gläuben all an einen Gott
  - BWV 681 – Fughetta super: Wir gläuben all an einen Gott (manuals only)
- "Vater unser im Himmelreich" (Lord's Prayer):
  - BWV 682 – Vater unser im Himmelreich
  - BWV 683 – Vater unser im Himmelreich (manuals only)
    BWV 683a – Vater unser im Himmelreich (variant of BWV 683: doubtful arrangement)
- "Christ unser Herr zum Jordan kam" (Baptism):
  - BWV 684 – Christ unser Herr zum Jordan kam
  - BWV 685 – Christ unser Herr zum Jordan kam (manuals only)
- "Aus tiefer Not schrei ich zu dir" (Penitence):
  - BWV 686 – Aus tiefer Not schrei ich zu dir
  - BWV 687 – Aus tiefer Not schrei ich zu dir (manuals only)
- "Jesus Christus, unser Heiland, der von uns den Zorn Gottes wandt" (Lord's Supper):
  - BWV 688 – Jesus Christus, unser Heiland, der von uns den Zorn Gottes wandt
  - BWV 689 – Fuga super: Jesus Christus, unser Heiland (manuals only)

=== 24 chorale preludes, formerly known as "from the Kirnberger collection" (BWV 690–713) ===
The 24 chorale preludes and five variants published as "from the Kirnberger Collection" ("in Kirnberger's Sammlung") in the 40th volume of the Bach-Gesellschaft Ausgabe (1893) were all retained in the 690–713a range of the Bach-Werke-Verzeichnis. Johann Kirnberger's involvement with this collection of chorale preludes, some of which are spurious or doubtful, is however uncertain: modern scholarship no longer refers to this set as "Kirnberger Collection" (unless with qualifiers such as "so-called" or "formerly").

1. BWV 690 – Wer nur den lieben Gott läßt walten
2. BWV 691 – Wer nur den lieben Gott läßt walten (manuals only; No. 11 in the 1725 Notebook for Anna Magdalena Bach, No. 3 in the Klavierbüchlein für Wilhelm Friedemann Bach)
  BWV 691a – Wer nur den lieben Gott läßt walten (doubtful variant of BWV 691)
3. BWV 692 – Ach, Gott und Herr (spurious: composed by Johann Gottfried Walther)
  BWV 692a – Ach, Gott und Herr (spurious early version of BWV 692: composed by Johann Gottfried Walther)
4. BWV 693 – Ach, Gott und Herr (spurious: composed by Johann Gottfried Walther)
5. BWV 694 – Wo soll ich fliehen hin
6. BWV 695 – Fantasia super: Christ lag in Todesbanden (manuals only)
  BWV 695a – Christ lag in Todesbanden (doubtful variant of BWV 695)
7. BWV 696 – Christum wir sollen loben schon (or) Was fürchtest du Feind, Herodes, sehr (fughetta; manuals only)
8. BWV 697 – Gelobet seist du, Jesu Christ (fughetta; manuals only)
9. BWV 698 – Herr Christ, der ein'ge Gottes-Sohn (fughetta; manuals only)
10. BWV 699 – Nun komm, der Heiden Heiland (fughetta; manuals only)
11. BWV 700 – Vom Himmel hoch, da komm' ich her
12. BWV 701 – Vom Himmel hoch, da komm' ich her (fughetta, manuals only)
13. BWV 702 – Das Jesulein soll doch mein Trost (fughetta)
14. BWV 703 – Gottes-Sohn ist kommen (fughetta, manuals only)
15. BWV 704 – Lob sei dem allmächtigen Gott (fughetta, manuals only)
16. BWV 705 – Durch Adams Fall ist ganz verderbt
17. BWV 706 – Liebster Jesu, wir sind hier
18. BWV 707 – Ich hab' mein' Sach' Gott heimgestellt
19. BWV 708 – Ich hab' mein' Sach' Gott heimgestellt
  BWV 708a – Ich hab' mein' Sach' Gott heimgestellt (variant of BWV 708)
20. BWV 709 – Herr Jesu Christ, dich zu uns wend'
21. BWV 710 – Wir Christenleut habn jetzund Freud
22. BWV 711 – Allein Gott in der Höh' sei Ehr'
23. BWV 712 – In dich hab' ich gehoffet, Herr (manuals only)
24. BWV 713 – Jesu, meine Freude (manuals only)
  BWV 713a – Jesu, meine Freude (Fantasia, doubtful variant of BWV 713)

=== Miscellaneous chorale preludes (BWV 714–765) ===
- BWV 714 – Ach Gott und Herr (also in the Neumeister Collection)
- BWV 715 – Allein Gott in der Höh sei Ehr
- BWV 716 – Fuga super Allein Gott in der Höh sei Ehr
- BWV 717 – Allein Gott in der Höh sei Ehr'
- BWV 718 – Christ lag in Todesbanden (chorale fantasia)
- BWV 719 – Der Tag, der ist so freudenreich (also in the Neumeister Collection)
- BWV 720 – Ein feste Burg ist unser Gott
- BWV 721 – Erbarm dich mein, o Herre Gott sample
- BWV 722 – Gelobet seist du, Jesu Christ
- BWV 723 – Gelobet seist du, Jesu Christ (also in the Neumeister Collection; likely by Johann Michael Bach)
- BWV 724 – Gott, durch deine Güte (Gottes Sohn ist kommen)
- BWV 725 – Herr Gott, dich loben wir
- BWV 726 – Herr Jesu Christ, dich zu uns wend (audio)
- BWV 727 – Herzlich tut mich verlangen
- BWV 728 – Jesus, meine Zuversicht (from the 1722 Notebook for Anna Magdalena Bach)
- BWV 729 – In dulci jubilo
- BWV 730 – Liebster Jesu, wir sind hier
- BWV 731 – Liebster Jesu, wir sind hier
- BWV 732 – Lobt Gott, ihr Christen, allzugleich
- BWV 733 – Fuga sopra il Magnificat (Meine Seele erhebt den Herren, a.k.a. German Magnificat – possibly composed by Bach's pupil Johann Ludwig Krebs; performed on the Herbst organ of the Schlosskirche in Lahm)
- BWV 734 – Nun freut euch, lieben Christen g'mein/Es ist gewisslich an der Zeit
- BWV 735 – Valet will ich dir geben
- BWV 736 – Valet will ich dir geben
- BWV 737 – Vater unser im Himmelreich (also in the Neumeister Collection)
- BWV 738 – Von Himmel hoch, da komm' ich her
- BWV 738a – Von Himmel hoch, da komm' ich her
- BWV 739 – Wie schön leuchtet der Morgenstern
- BWV 740 – Wir glauben all' an einen Gott, Vater (spurious, partly attributed to Johann Tobias Krebs)
- BWV 741 – Ach Gott, von Himmel sieh' darein
- BWV 742 – Ach Herr, mich armen Sünder (also in the Neumeister Collection)
- BWV 743 – Ach, was ist doch unser Leben
- BWV 744 – Auf meinen lieben Gott (not by Bach, possibly by Johann Tobias Krebs)
- BWV 745 – Aus der Tiefe rufe ich (not by Bach, composed by Carl Philipp Emanuel Bach)
- BWV 746 – Christ ist erstanden (not by Bach, composed by Johann Caspar Ferdinand Fischer)
- BWV 747 – Christus, der uns selig macht
- BWV 748 – Gott der Vater wohn' uns bei (not by Bach, composed by Johann Gottfried Walther)
- BWV 748a – Gott der Vater wohn' uns bei
- BWV 749 – Herr Jesu Christ, dich zu uns wend' (attribution doubtful)
- BWV 750 – Herr Jesu Christ, mein's Lebens Licht (attribution doubtful)
- BWV 751 – In dulci jubilo (also in the Neumeister Collection; spurious: likely by Johann Michael Bach or possibly by Johann Gottfried Walther)
- BWV 752 – Jesu, der du meine Seele (attribution doubtful)
- BWV 753 – Jesu, meine Freude (incomplete)
- BWV 754 – Liebster Jesu, wir sind hier (attribution doubtful)
- BWV 755 – Nun freut euch, lieben Christen
- BWV 756 – Nun ruhen alle Wälder (attribution doubtful)
- BWV 757 – O Herre Gott, dein göttlich's Wort
- BWV 758 – O Vater, allmächtiger Gott
- BWV 759 – Schmücke dich, o liebe Seele (not by Bach, composed by Gottfried August Homilius)
- BWV 760 – Vater unser im Himmelreich (not by Bach, composed by Georg Böhm)
- BWV 761 – Vater unser im Himmelreich (not by Bach, composed by Georg Böhm)
- BWV 762 – Vater unser im Himmelreich (attribution doubtful)
- BWV 763 – Wie schön leuchtet der Morgenstern
- BWV 764 – Wie schön leuchtet der Morgenstern (incomplete)
- BWV 765 – Wir glauben all' an einen Gott

=== Chorale partitas (BWV 766–768) ===
- BWV 766 – Chorale partita Christ, der du bist der helle Tag
- BWV 767 – Chorale partita O Gott, du frommer Gott
- BWV 768 – Chorale partita Sei gegrüsset, Jesu gütig

=== Canonic Variations (BWV 769–769a) ===
- BWV 769 – Canonic Variations on "Vom Himmel hoch da komm' ich her"
- BWV 769a – Canonic Variations on "Vom Himmel hoch da komm' ich her" (alternative version of BWV 769)

=== Chorale variations (BWV 770–771) ===
- BWV 770 – Chorale variations "Ach, was soll ich Sünder machen"
- BWV 771 – Chorale variations "Allein Gott in der Höh' sei Ehr'" (not by Bach, possibly by Andreas Nicolaus Vetter)

=== Also known in a version for keyboard (BWV 957) ===
- BWV 957 – Machs mit mir, Gott, nach deiner Güt (chorale prelude for organ in the Neumeister Collection, previously listed as Fugue in G major)

== Later additions to the BWV catalogue ==
=== Various (BWV 1085–1087) ===
- BWV 1085 – O Lamm Gottes, unschuldig (chorale prelude)
- Canons, sometimes indicated as organ pieces:
  - BWV 1086 – Canon concordia discors
  - BWV 1087 – 14 canons on the First Eight Notes of Goldberg Variations Ground (discovered 1974)

=== Neumeister Chorales (BWV 1090–1120) ===
31 chorale preludes for organ, discovered 1985 in the archives of the Yale University library.

- BWV 1090 – Wir Christenleut
- BWV 1091 – Das alte Jahr vergangen ist
- BWV 1092 – Herr Gott, nun schleuß den Himmel auf
- BWV 1093 – Herzliebster Jesu, was hast du verbrochen
- BWV 1094 – O Jesu, wie ist dein Gestalt
- BWV 1095 – O Lamm Gottes unschuldig
- BWV 1096 – Christe, der du bist Tag und Licht (or) Wir danken dir, Herr Jesu Christ (spurious: attributed to Johann Pachelbel)
- BWV 1097 – Ehre sei dir, Christe, der du leidest Not
- BWV 1098 – Erhalt uns, Herr, bei deinem Wort
- BWV 1099 – Aus tiefer Not schrei ich zu dir
- BWV 1100 – Allein zu dir, Herr Jesu Christ
- BWV 1101 – Durch Adams Fall ist ganz verderbt
- BWV 1102 – Du Friedefürst, Herr Jesu Christ
- BWV 1103 – Erhalt uns, Herr, bei deinem Wort
- BWV 1104 – Wenn dich Unglück tut greifen an
- BWV 1105 – Jesu, meine Freude
- BWV 1106 – Gott ist mein Heil, mein Hilf und Trost
- BWV 1107 – Jesu, meines Lebens Leben
- BWV 1108 – Als Jesus Christus in der Nacht
- BWV 1109 – Ach Gott, tu dich erbarmen
- BWV 1110 – O Herre Gott, dein göttlich Wort
- BWV 1111 – Nun lasset uns den Leib begrab'n
- BWV 1112 – Christus, der ist mein Leben
- BWV 1113 – Ich hab mein Sach Gott heimgestellt
- BWV 1114 – Herr Jesu Christ, du höchstes Gut
- BWV 1115 – Herzlich lieb hab ich dich, o Herr
- BWV 1116 – Was Gott tut, das ist wohlgetan
- BWV 1117 – Alle Menschen müssen sterben
- BWV 1118 – Werde munter, mein Gemüte
- BWV 1119 – Wie nach einer Wasserquelle
- BWV 1120 – Christ, der du bist der helle Tag

=== Recovered from the Anhang (BWV 1121 and 1128) ===
- BWV 1121 (=BWV Anh. 205) – Fantasie in C minor (organ)
- BWV 1128 (previously BWV Anh. 71) – Organ chorale fantasia Wo Gott der Herr nicht bei uns hält (BWV Anh. II 71 was authenticated as a composition by Bach after Wilhelm Rust's 1877 copy was recovered in March 2008).

== Organ compositions in the seventh chapter of the Bach-Werke-Verzeichnis (1998) ==
Legend to the table
column		content
1	BWV	Bach-Werke-Verzeichnis (lit. 'Bach-works-catalogue'; BWV) numbers. Anhang (Annex; Anh.) numbers are indicated as follows: preceded by I: in Anh. I (lost works) of BWV^{1} (1950 first edition of the BWV); preceded by II: in Anh. II (doubtful works) of BWV^{1}; preceded by III: in Anh. III (spurious works) of BWV^{1}; preceded by N: new Anh. numbers in BWV^{2} (1990) and/or BWV^{2a} (1998)
2	^{2a}	Section in which the composition appears in BWV^{2a}: Chapters of the main catalogue indicated by Arabic numerals (1-13); Anh. sections indicated by Roman numerals (I–III); Reconstructions published in the NBE indicated by "R"
3	Date	Date associated with the completion of the listed version of the composition. Exact dates (e.g. for most cantatas) usually indicate the assumed date of first (public) performance. When the date is followed by an abbreviation in brackets (e.g. JSB for Johann Sebastian Bach) it indicates the date of that person's involvement with the composition as composer, scribe or publisher.
4	Name	Name of the composition: if the composition is known by a German incipit, that German name is preceded by the composition type (e.g. cantata, chorale prelude, motet, ...)
5	Key	Key of the composition
6	Scoring	See scoring table below for the abbreviations used in this column
7	BG	Bach Gesellschaft-Ausgabe (BG edition; BGA): numbers before the colon indicate the volume in that edition. After the colon an Arabic numeral indicates the page number where the score of the composition begins, while a Roman numeral indicates a description of the composition in the Vorwort (Preface) of the volume.
8	NBE	New Bach Edition (German: Neue Bach-Ausgabe, NBA): Roman numerals for the series, followed by a slash, and the volume number in Arabic numerals. A page number, after a colon, refers to the "Score" part of the volume. Without such page number, the composition is only described in the "Critical Commentary" part of the volume. The volumes group Bach's compositions by genre: 1. Cantatas (Vol. 1–34: church cantatas grouped by occasion; Vol. 35–40: secular cantatas; Vol. 41: Varia); 2. Masses, Passions, Oratorios (12 volumes); 3. Motets, Chorales, Lieder (4 volumes); 4. Organ Works (11 volumes); 5. Keyboard and Lute Works (14 volumes); 6. Chamber Music (5 volumes); 7. Orchestral Works (7 volumes); 8. Canons, Musical Offering, Art of Fugue (3 volumes); 9. Addenda (approximately 7 volumes)
9	Additional info	may include: "after" – indicating a model for the composition; "by" – indicating the composer of the composition (if different from Johann Sebastian Bach); "in" – indicating the oldest known source for the composition; "pasticcio" – indicating a composition with parts of different origin; "see" – composition renumbered in a later edition of the BWV; "text" – by text author, or, in source; Provenance of standard texts and tunes, such as Lutheran hymns and their chorale melodies, Latin liturgical texts (e.g. Magnificat) and common tunes (e.g. Folia), are not usually indicated in this column. For an overview of such resources used by Bach, see individual composition articles, and overviews in, e.g., Chorale cantata (Bach)#Bach's chorale cantatas, List of chorale harmonisations by Johann Sebastian Bach#Chorale harmonisations in various collections and List of organ compositions by Johann Sebastian Bach#Chorale Preludes.
10	BD	Bach Digital Work page

Legend for abbreviations in "Scoring" column
Voices (see also SATB)
a	A	b	B	s	S	t	T	v			V	
alto (solo part)	alto (choir part)	bass (solo part)	bass (choir part)	soprano (solo part)	soprano (choir part)	tenor (solo part)	tenor (choir part)	voice (includes parts for unspecified voices or instruments as in some canons)			vocal music for unspecified voice type	
Winds and battery (bold = soloist)
Bas	Bel	Cnt	Fl	Hn	Ob	Oba	Odc	Tai	Tbn	Tdt	Tmp	Tr
bassoon (can be part of Bc, see below)	bell(s) (musical bells)	cornett, cornettino	flute (traverso, flauto dolce, piccolo, flauto basso)	natural horn, corno da caccia, corno da tirarsi, lituo	oboe	oboe d'amore	oboe da caccia	taille	trombone	tromba da tirarsi	timpani	tromba (natural trumpet, clarino trumpet)
Strings and keyboard (bold = soloist)
Bc		Hc	Kb	Lu	Lw	Org	Str	Va	Vc	Vdg	Vl	Vne
basso continuo: Vdg, Hc, Vc, Bas, Org, Vne and/or Lu		harpsichord	keyboard (Hc, Lw, Org or clavichord)	lute, theorbo	Lautenwerck (lute-harpsichord)	organ (/man. = manualiter, without pedals)	strings: Vl I, Vl II and Va	viola(s), viola d'amore, violetta	violoncello, violoncello piccolo	viola da gamba	violin(s), violino piccolo	violone, violone grosso

Background colours
Colour	Meaning
green	extant or clearly documented partial or complete manuscript (copy) by Bach and/or first edition under Bach's supervision
yellow	extant or clearly documented manuscript (copy) or print edition, in whole or in part, by close relative, i.e. brother (J. Christoph), wife (A. M.), son (W. F. / C. P. E. / J. C. F. / J. Christian) or son-in-law (Altnickol)
orange-brown	extant or clearly documented manuscript (copy) by close friend and/or pupil (Kellner, Krebs, Kirnberger, Walther, ...), or distant family member

Compositions for organ in Chapter 7 of BWV^{2a}
BWV	^{2a}	Date	Name	Key	Scoring	BG	NBE	Additional info	BD
525	7.	1727–1731	Trio Sonata No. 1/6	E♭ maj.	Organ	15: 3	IV/7: 1	→ BWV 525a	00597
526	7.	1727–1731	Trio Sonata No. 2/6	C min.	Organ	15: 13	IV/7: 14		00598
527	7.	1727–1731	Trio Sonata No. 3/6 (+e. v. for /1)	D min.	Organ	15: 26	IV/7: 28	→ BWV 1044/2	00599
528	7.	1727–1731	Trio Sonata No. 4/6 (+e. v. for /2, /3)	E min.	Organ	15: 40	IV/7: 44	after BWV 76/8	00600
529	7.	1727–1731	Trio Sonata No. 5/6 (+e. v. for /2)	C maj.	Organ	15: 50	IV/7: 56		00601
530	7.	1727–1731	Trio Sonata No. 6/6	G maj.	Organ	15: 66	IV/7: 76		00602
531	7.	c. 1703–1706	Prelude and Fugue	C maj.	Organ	15: 81	IV/5: 3	in Möllersche Handschrift	00603
532.2	7.	c. 1708–1712	Prelude and Fugue	D maj.	Organ	15: 88	IV/5: 58	after BWV 912/1, 532.1	00604
532.1	7.		Fugue (early version)	D maj.	Organ		IV/6: 95	→ BWV 532.2/2	00605
533	7.	c.1704	Prelude and Fugue ("Cathedral")	E min.	Organ	15: 100	IV/5: 90	↔ BWV 533a	00606
533a	7.		Prelude and Fugue	E min.	Keyboard		IV/6: 106	↔ BWV 533	00607
535	7.	after 1717	Prelude and Fugue	G min.	Organ	15: 112	IV/5: 157	after BWV 535a	00609
535a	7.	c.1702–1704	Prelude and Fugue (incomplete)	G min.	Organ		IV/6: 109	→ BWV 535; in Möllersche Handschrift	00610
536	7.	1708–1717	Prelude and Fugue	A maj.	Organ	15: 120	IV/5: 180	↔ BWV 152/1; → 536a	00611
537	7.	1729–1750	Fantasia and Fugue	C min.	Organ	15: 129	IV/5: 47		00613
538	7.	1712–1717	Toccata and Fugue ("Dorian")	D min.	Organ	15: 136	IV/5: 76		00614
539	7.	1724–1750?	Prelude and Fugue	D min.	Organ	15: 148	IV/5: 70	after BWV 1001/2, 1000	00615
540	7.	c.1712–1717?	Toccata and Fugue	F maj.	Organ	15: 154	IV/5: 112		00616
541; 528/3	7.	c.1712–1717?	Toccata and Fugue (Trio BWV 528/3 e. v. as possible middle movement)	G maj.	Organ	15: 169	IV/5: 146	→ BWV 528/3	00617
542	7.	c.1714–1720?	Fantasia and Fugue ("Great"; independent compositions?; fugue also in F minor)	G min.	Organ	15: 177	IV/5: 167		00618
543	7.	after c.1730	Prelude and Fugue	A min.	Organ	15: 189	IV/5: 186	after BWV 543/1a	00619
543/1a	7.	bef. c.1725	Prelude	A min.	Organ		IV/6: 121	→ BWV 543/1	00620
544	7.	1727–1731 (JSB)	Prelude and Fugue	B min.	Organ	15: 199	IV/5: 198		00621
545; 529/2	7.	1708–1717 after 1722	Prelude and Fugue (middle movement BWV 529/2 e. v. removed after 1722)	C maj.	Organ	15: 212	IV/5: 10	after BWV 545a, b; → 529/2	00622
545a	7.	1708–1717	Prelude and Fugue (early version)	C maj.	Organ		IV/6: 77	→ BWV 545b, 545	00623
546	7.	1708–1750	Prelude and Fugue	C min.	Organ	15: 218	IV/5: 35		00625
547	7.	1719–1750	Prelude and Fugue	C maj.	Organ	15: 228	IV/5: 20		00626
548	7.	1727–1731 (JSB)	Prelude and Fugue ("Wedge")	E min.	Organ	15: 236	IV/5: 94		00627
549	7.	1705–1750	Prelude and Fugue	C min.	Organ	38: 3	IV/5: 30	after BWV 549a	00628
549a	7.	bef. c.1703	Prelude (or: Fantasia) and Fugue	D min.	Organ		IV/6: 101	→ BWV 549; in Möllersche Handschrift	00629
550	7.	c.1708–1712	Prelude and Fugue	G maj.	Organ	38: 9	IV/5: 138		00630
551	7.	c.1699	Prelude and Fugue	A min.	Organ	38: 17	IV/6: 63		00631
552	7.	1739	Prelude and Fugue ("St Anne") from Clavier-Übung III	E♭ maj.	Organ	3: 173, 254	IV/4: 2, 105		00632
562	7.	1720–c.1748	Fantasia and Fugue (unfinished fugue added c.1747–1748)	C min.	Organ	38: 64, 209; 44: 4	IV/5: 54		00642
563	7.	c.1704	Fantasia and Imitatio	C maj.	Organ	38: 59	IV/6: 68	in Andreas-Bach-Buch	00643
564	7.	1708–1717	Toccata, Adagio and Fugue	C maj.	Organ	15: 253	IV/6: 3		00644
565	7.	c.1704?	Toccata and Fugue	D min.	Organ	15: 267	IV/6: 31		00645
566	7.	1703–1707	Prelude and Fugue (earliest manuscripts: C major; /1 as Toccata in BGA)	E maj. C maj.	Organ	15: 276	IV/6: 40		00646
569	7.	1703–c.1704	Prelude	A min.	Organ	38: 89	IV/6: 59		00649
1121	7.	c.1708–1709	Fantasia	C min.	Organ		IV/11: 54	in Andreas-Bach-Buch; was Anh. 205	01516
570	7.	c.1698–1704	Fantasia	C maj.	Organ	38: 62	IV/6: 16	in Andreas-Bach-Buch	00650
572	7.	1708–c.1712	Fantasia, a.k.a. Pièce d'Orgue (+reworked version)	G maj.	Organ	38: 75	IV/7: 130, 144		00652
573	7.	c.1723–1724	Notebook A. M. Bach (1722) No. 6 Fantasia (incomplete?)	C maj.	Keyboard	38: 209; 43^{2}: 3	V/4: 39; IV/6: 18		00653
574	7.	after c.1708?	Fugue on a theme by Legrenzi	C min.	Organ	38: 94	IV/6: 19	after BWV 574b; ↔ 574a	00654
574a	7.	after c.1708?	Fugue on a theme by Legrenzi (variant)	C min.	Organ	38: 205	IV/6: 82	after BWV 574b; ↔ 574	00655
574b	7.	c.1707–1713 or earlier	Fugue on a theme by Legrenzi (early version)	C min.	Organ		IV/6: 88	after Legrenzi (theme); → BWV 574a, 574; in Andreas-Bach-Buch	00656
575	7.	1708–1717?	Fugue	C min.	Organ	38: 101	IV/6: 26		00657
578	7.	c.1713 or earlier	Fugue ("Little")	G min.	Organ	38: 116	IV/6: 55	in Andreas-Bach-Buch	00660
579	7.	c.1703–1707	Fugue on a theme by Corelli	B min.	Organ	38: 121	IV/6: 71	after Corelli (theme)	00661
582	7.	c.1709–1710	Passacaglia (and Fugue)	C min.	Organ	15: 289	IV/7: 98	in Andreas-Bach-Buch	00664
583	7.	c.1708–1717	Trio	D min.	Organ	38: 143	IV/7: 94		00665
585	7.	c.1726–1727 (JSB)	Trio	C min.	Organ	38: 219	IV/8: 73	after Fasch J. F., FaWV N:c2/1, /2; arr. by Bach	00667
586	7.	bef. c.1740	Trio	G maj.	Organ		IV/8: 78	after Telemann?	00668
587	7.	c.1714?	Aria	F maj.	Organ	38: 222	IV/8: 82	after Couperin, Les Nations^{III}/4	00669
588	7.	c.1703–1707	Canzona	D min.	Organ	38: 126	IV/7: 118	in Möllersche Handschrift	00670
589	7.	bef. c.1742	Alla breve	D maj.	Organ	38: 131	IV/7: 114		00671
590	7.	c.1723–1727 or later	Pastorella (/1 incomplete?)	F maj.	Organ	38: 135	IV/7: 122		00672
592	7.	c.1714–1717	Concerto for solo organ	G maj.	Organ	38: 149	IV/8: 56	after J. E. of Saxe-Weimar, Concerto a 8; → BWV 592a	00674
592a	7.	c.1714–1717	Concerto for solo harpsichord	G maj.	Keyboard	42: 282	V/11: 150	after BWV 592	00675
593	7.	c.1714–1717	Concerto for solo organ	A min.	Organ	38: 158	IV/8: 16	after Vivaldi, Op. 3 No. 8 (RV 522)	00676
594	7.	c.1714–1717	Concerto for solo organ	C maj.	Organ	38: 171	IV/8: 30	after Vivaldi, RV 208, Grosso Mogul	00677
595	7.	c.1714–1717	Concerto for solo organ	C maj.	Organ	38: 196	IV/8: 65	after BWV 984/1	00678
596	7.	c.1714–1717	Concerto for solo organ (arrangement previously attributed to W. F. Bach)	D min.	Organ		IV/8: 3	after Vivaldi, Op. 3 No. 11 (RV 565)	00679
599	7.	c.1711–1713	chorale setting "Nun komm, der Heiden Heiland" (Orgelbüchlein No. 1)	A min.	Organ	25^{2}: 3	IV/1: 3	after Z 1174	00682
600	7.	c.1711–1713	chorale setting "Gott durch deine Güte" (Orgelbüchlein No. 2)	F maj.	Organ	25^{2}: 4	IV/1: 4	after Z 3294	00683
600	7.	c.1711–1713	chorale setting "Gottes Sohn ist kommen" (Orgelbüchlein No. 2)	F maj.	Organ	25^{2}: 4	IV/1: 4	after Z 3294	00683
601	7.	c.1708–1711 or earlier	chorale setting "Herr Christ, der ein'ge Gottes Sohn" (Orgelbüchlein No. 3; also in Neumeister Collection)	A maj.	Organ	25^{2}: 5	IV/1: 6	after Z 4297a	00684
601	7.	c.1708–1711 or earlier	chorale setting "Herr Gott, nun sei gepreiset" (Orgelbüchlein No. 3; also in Neumeister Collection)	A maj.	Organ	25^{2}: 5	IV/1: 6	after Z 4297a	00684
602	7.	c.1711–1713	chorale setting "Lob sei dem allmächtigen Gott" (Orgelbüchlein No. 4)	D min.	Organ	25^{2}: 6	IV/1: 7	after Z 339	00685
603	7.	c.1711–1713	chorale setting "Puer natus in Bethlehem" (Orgelbüchlein No. 5)	G min.	Organ	25^{2}: 6	IV/1: 8	after Z 192b	00686
604	7.	c.1711–1713	chorale setting "Gelobet seist du, Jesu Christ" (Orgelbüchlein No. 6)	G maj.	Organ	25^{2}: 7	IV/1: 11	after Z 1947	00687
605	7.	c.1711–1713	chorale setting "Der Tag, der ist so freudenreich" (Orgelbüchlein No. 7)	G maj.	Organ	25^{2}: 8	IV/1: 11	after Z 7870	00688
606	7.	c.1708–1711 or earlier	chorale setting "Vom Himmel hoch, da komm ich her" (Orgelbüchlein No. 8)	D maj.	Organ	25^{2}: 9	IV/1: 13	after Z 346	00689
607	7.	c.1711–1713	chorale setting "Vom Himmel kam der Engel Schar" (Orgelbüchlein No. 9)	G min.	Organ	25^{2}: 10	IV/1: 14	after Z 192a	00690
608	7.	c.1711–1713	chorale setting "In dulci jubilo" (Orgelbüchlein No. 10)	A maj.	Organ	25^{2}: 12	IV/1: 16	after Z 4947	00691
609	7.	c.1711–1713	chorale setting "Lobt Gott, ihr Christen allzugleich" (Orgelbüchlein No. 11)	G maj.	Organ	25^{2}: 13	IV/1: 18	after Z 198	00692
610	7.	c.1711–1713	chorale setting "Jesu, meine Freude" (Orgelbüchlein No. 12)	C min.	Organ	25^{2}: 14	IV/1: 19	after Z 8032	00693
611	7.	c.1714–1716	chorale setting "Christum wir sollen loben schon" (Orgelbüchlein No. 13)	E min.	Organ	25^{2}: 15	IV/1: 20	after Z 297c	00694
612	7.	c.1711–1713	chorale setting "Wir Christenleut" (Orgelbüchlein No. 14)	G min.	Organ	25^{2}: 16	IV/1: 22	after Z 2072	00695
613	7.	c.1740	chorale setting "Helft mir Gotts Güte preisen" (Orgelbüchlein No. 15)	B min.	Organ	25^{2}: 18	IV/1: 24	after Z 5267	00696
614	7.	c.1711–1713	chorale setting "Das alte Jahr vergangen ist" (Orgelbüchlein No. 16)	A min.	Organ	25^{2}: 19	IV/1: 25	after Z 381c	00697
615	7.	c.1708–1711	chorale setting "In dir ist Freude" (Orgelbüchlein No. 17)	G maj.	Organ	25^{2}: 20	IV/1: 27	after Z 8537	00698
616	7.	c.1714–1716	chorale setting "Mit Fried und Freud ich fahr dahin" (Orgelbüchlein No. 18)	D min.	Organ	25^{2}: 24	IV/1: 30	after Z 3986	00699
617	7.	c.1714–1716	chorale setting "Herr Gott, nun schleuß den Himmel auf" (Orgelbüchlein No. 19)	A min.	Organ	25^{2}: 26	IV/1: 32	after Z 7641b	00700
618	7.	c.1714–1716	chorale setting "O Lamm Gottes, unschuldig" (Orgelbüchlein No. 20)	F maj.	Organ	25^{2}: 28	IV/1: 34	after Z 4361a	00701
619	7.	c.1714–1716	chorale setting "Christe, du Lamm Gottes" (Orgelbüchlein No. 21)	F maj.	Organ	25^{2}: 30	IV/1: 36	after Z 58	00702
620	7.	c.1726	chorale setting "Christus, der uns selig macht" (Orgelbüchlein No. 22)	A min.	Organ	25^{2}: 30	IV/1: 37	after BWV 620a	00703
620a	7.	c.1714–1716	chorale setting "Christus, der uns selig macht" (Orgelbüchlein No. 22, e. v.)	A min.	Organ	25^{2}: 149	IV/1: 78	after Z 6283b; → BWV 620	00704
621	7.	c.1711–1713	chorale setting "Da Jesus an dem Kreuze stund" (Orgelbüchlein No. 23)	A min.	Organ	25^{2}: 32	IV/1: 39	after Z 1706	00705
622	7.	c.1711–1713	chorale setting "O Mensch, bewein dein Sünde groß" (Orgelbüchlein No. 24)	E♭ maj.	Organ	25^{2}: 33	IV/1: 40	after Z 8303; → BWV 622 (var.)	00706
622 (var.)	7.	1716–1789	chorale setting "O Mensch, bewein dein Sünde groß" (variant)		Organ			after BWV 622	00707
623	7.	c.1714–1716	chorale setting "Wir danken dir, Herr Jesu Christ" (Orgelbüchlein No. 25)	G maj.	Organ	25^{2}: 35	IV/1: 42	after Z 423	00708
624	7.	c.1714–1716	chorale setting "Hilf Gott, dass mir's gelinge" (Orgelbüchlein No. 26)	G min.	Organ	25^{2}: 36	IV/1: 44	after Z 4329	00709
625	7.	c.1708–1711 or earlier	chorale setting "Christ lag in Todesbanden" (Orgelbüchlein No. 27)	D min.	Organ	25^{2}: 38	IV/1: 46	after Z 7012a	00710
626	7.	c.1711–1713	chorale setting "Jesus Christus, unser Heiland, der den Tod überwand" (Orgelbüchlein No. 28)	A min.	Organ	25^{2}: 39	IV/1: 48	after Z 1978	00711
627	7.	c.1711–1713	chorale setting "Christ ist erstanden" (Orgelbüchlein No. 29)	D min.	Organ	25^{2}: 40	IV/1: 49	after Z 8584	00712
628	7.	c.1711–1713	chorale setting "Erstanden ist der heilge Christ" (Orgelbüchlein No. 30)	D maj.	Organ	25^{2}: 44	IV/1: 54	after Z 1747a	00713
629	7.	c.1711–1713	chorale setting "Erschienen ist der herrliche Tag" (Orgelbüchlein No. 31)	D min.	Organ	25^{2}: 45	IV/1: 55	after Z 1743	00714
630	7.	c.1708–1711 or earlier	chorale setting "Heut triumphieret Gottes Sohn" (Orgelbüchlein No. 32)	D min.	Organ	25^{2}: 46	IV/1: 56	after BWV 630a	00715
630a	7.	c.1708–1711 or earlier	chorale setting "Heut triumphieret Gottes Sohn" (Orgelbüchlein No. 32, e. v.)		Organ		IV/1: 80	after Z 2585; → BWV 630	00716
631	7.	c.1726	chorale setting "Komm, Gott Schöpfer, heiliger Geist" (Orgelbüchlein No. 33)	D min.	Organ	25^{2}: 47	IV/1: 58	after BWV 631a	00717
631a	7.	c.1711–1713	chorale setting "Komm, Gott Schöpfer, heiliger Geist" (Orgelbüchlein No. 33, e. v.)	G maj.	Organ	25^{2}: 150	IV/1: 82	after Z 295; → BWV 631	00718
632	7.	c.1711–1713	chorale setting "Herr Jesu Christ, dich zu uns wend" (Orgelbüchlein No. 34)	F maj.	Organ	25^{2}: 48	IV/1: 59	after Z 624	00719
633	7.	c.1711–1713	chorale setting "Liebster Jesu, wir sind hier" distinctus (Orgelbüchlein No. 36)	A maj.	Organ	25^{2}: 49	IV/1: 61	after BWV 634	00720
634	7.	c.1711–1713	chorale setting "Liebster Jesu, wir sind hier" (Orgelbüchlein No. 35)	A maj.	Organ	25^{2}: 50	IV/1: 60	after Z 3498b; → BWV 633	00721
635	7.	c.1711–1713	chorale setting "Dies sind die heilgen zehn Gebot" (Orgelbüchlein No. 37)	C maj.	Organ	25^{2}: 50	IV/1: 62	after Z 1951	00722
636	7.	c.1711–1713	chorale setting "Vater unser im Himmelreich" (Orgelbüchlein No. 38)	D min.	Organ	25^{2}: 52	IV/1: 64	after Z 2561	00723
637	7.	c.1711–1713	chorale setting "Durch Adams Fall ist ganz verderbt" (Orgelbüchlein No. 39)	A min.	Organ	25^{2}: 53	IV/1: 65	after Z 7549	00724
638	7.	c.1708–1711 or earlier	chorale setting "Es ist das Heil uns kommen her" (Orgelbüchlein No. 40)	D maj.	Organ	25^{2}: 54	IV/1: 66	after BWV 638a	00725
638a	7.	c.1708–1711 or earlier	chorale setting "Es ist das Heil uns kommen her" (Orgelbüchlein No. 40, e. v.)		Organ		IV/1: 83	after Z 4430; → BWV 638	00726
639	7.	c.1708–1711 or earlier	chorale setting "Ich ruf zu dir, Herr Jesu Christ" (Orgelbüchlein No. 41; also in Neumeister Collection)	F min.	Organ	25^{2}: 55	IV/1: 68	after Z 7400; → BWV Anh. 73	00727
640	7.	c.1711–1713	chorale setting "In dich hab ich gehoffet, Herr" (Orgelbüchlein No. 42)	E min.	Organ	25^{2}: 56	IV/1: 70	after Z 2459	00728
641	7.	c.1711–1713	chorale setting "Wenn wir in höchsten Nöten sein" (Orgelbüchlein No. 43)	G maj.	Organ	25^{2}: 57	IV/1: 71	after Z 394	00729
642	7.	c.1711–1713	chorale setting "Wer nur den lieben Gott lässt walten" (Orgelbüchlein No. 44)	A min.	Organ	25^{2}: 58	IV/1: 72	after Z 2778	00730
643	7.	c.1711–1713	chorale setting "Alle Menschen müssen sterben" (Orgelbüchlein No. 45)	G maj.	Organ	25^{2}: 59	IV/1: 74	after Z 6779a	00731
644	7.	c.1711–1713	chorale setting "Ach wie nichtig, ach wie flüchtig" (Orgelbüchlein No. 46)	G min.	Organ	25^{2}: 60	IV/1: 75	after Z 1887b	00732
645	7.	1747–1748	chorale setting "Wachet auf, ruft uns die Stimme" (Schübler Chorales No. 1)	E♭ maj.	Organ	25^{2}: 63	IV/1: 86	after BWV 140/4	00733
646	7.	1747–1748	chorale setting "Wo soll ich fliehen hin" (Schübler Chorales No. 2)	E min.	Organ	25^{2}: 66	IV/1: 90	after Z 2164	00734
646	7.	1747–1748	chorale setting "Auf meinen lieben Gott" (Schübler Chorales No. 2)	E min.	Organ	25^{2}: 66	IV/1: 90	after Z 2164	00734
647	7.	1747–1748	chorale setting "Wer nur den lieben Gott lässt walten" (Schübler Chorales No. 3)	C min.	Organ	25^{2}: 68	IV/1: 92	after BWV 93/4	00735
648	7.	1747–1748	chorale setting "Meine Seele erhebt den Herren" (Schübler Chorales No. 4)	D min.	Organ	25^{2}: 70	IV/1: 94	after BWV 10/5	00736
649	7.	1747–1748	chorale setting "Ach bleib bei uns, Herr Jesu Christ" (Schübler Chorales No. 5)	B♭ maj.	Organ	25^{2}: 71	IV/1: 95	after BWV 6/3	00737
650	7.	1747–1748	chorale setting "Kommst du nun, Jesu, vom Himmel herunter" (Schübler Chorales No. 6)	G maj.	Organ	25^{2}: 74	IV/1: 98	after BWV 137/2	00738
651	7.	c.1740	chorale setting "Komm, heiliger Geist" (Fantasia; Leipzig Chorales 1/18)	F maj.	Organ	25^{2}: 79	IV/2: 3	after BWV 651a	00739
651a	7.	1708–1714	chorale setting "Komm, heiliger Geist, Herre Gott" (Fantasia; e. v.: Weimar)		Organ	25^{2}: 151	IV/2: 117	after Z 7445a; → BWV 651	00740
652	7.	c.1740	chorale setting "Komm, heiliger Geist, Herre Gott" (alio modo; Leipzig Chorales 2/18)	G maj.	Organ	25^{2}: 86	IV/2: 13	after BWV 652a	00741
652a	7.	1708–1714	chorale setting "Komm, heiliger Geist, Herre Gott" (e. v.: Weimar)		Organ		IV/2: 121	after Z 7445a; → BWV 652	00742
653	7.	c.1740	chorale setting "An Wasserflüssen Babylon" (Leipzig Chorales 3/18)	G maj.	Organ	25^{2}: 92	IV/2: 22	after BWV 653a	00743
653a	7.	1708–1717	chorale setting "An Wasserflüssen Babylon" (alio modo; 2nd v.: Weimar)		Organ	25^{2}: 157	IV/2: 133	after BWV 653b; → BWV 653	00744
653b	7.	1708–1714	chorale setting "An Wasserflüssen Babylon" (à 5; 1st v.: Weimar)		Organ	40: 49	IV/2: 130	after Z 7663; → BWV 653a	00745
654	7.	c.1740	chorale setting "Schmücke dich, o liebe Seele" (Leipzig Chorales 4/18)	E♭ maj.	Organ	25^{2}: 95	IV/2: 26	after BWV 654a	00746
654a	7.	1708–1714	chorale setting "Schmücke dich, o liebe Seele" (e. v.: Weimar)		Organ		IV/2: 136	after Z 6923; → BWV 654	00747
655	7.	c.1740	chorale setting "Herr Jesu Christ, dich zu uns wend" (Trio; Leipzig Chorales 5/18)	G maj.	Organ	25^{2}: 98	IV/2: 31	after BWV 655a; ↔ 655 var. 1–4; → 655b–c	00748
655 var. 1	7.	1708–1798	chorale setting "Herr Jesu Christ, dich zu uns wend" (variant 1)		Organ			after Z 624; ↔ BWV 655(a), var. 2–4	00749
655 var. 2	7.	1708–1798	chorale setting "Herr Jesu Christ, dich zu uns wend" (variant 2)	F maj.	Organ			after Z 624; ↔ BWV 655(a), var. 1, 3–4	00750
655 var. 3	7.	1708–1798	chorale setting "Herr Jesu Christ, dich zu uns wend" (variant 3)	F maj.	Organ			after Z 624; ↔ BWV 655(a), var. 1–2, 4	00751
655 var. 4	7.	1708–1798	chorale setting "Herr Jesu Christ, dich zu uns wend" (variant 4)	F maj.	Organ			after Z 624; ↔ BWV 655(a), var. 1–3	00752
655a	7.	1708–1714	chorale setting "Herr Jesu Christ, dich zu uns wend" (Trio; e. v.: Weimar)		Organ	25^{2}: 162	IV/2: 140	after Z 624; ↔ BWV 655 var. 1–4; → 655	00753
656	7.	c.1740	chorale setting "O Lamm Gottes, unschuldig" (Leipzig Chorales 6/18)	A maj.	Organ	25^{2}: 102	IV/2: 38	after BWV 656a	00756
656a	7.	1708–1714	chorale setting "O Lamm Gottes, unschuldig" (e. v.: Weimar)		Organ	25^{2}: 166	IV/2: 146	after Z 4361b; → BWV 656	00757
657	7.	1708–1714	Chorale prelude Nun danket alle Gott (Leipzig Chorales 7/18)	G maj.	Organ	25^{2}: 108	IV/2: 46	after Z 5142	00758
658	7.	c.1740	chorale setting "Von Gott will ich nicht lassen" (Leipzig Chorales 8/18)	F min.	Organ	25^{2}: 112	IV/2: 51	after BWV 658a	00759
658a	7.	1708–1714	chorale setting "Von Gott will ich nicht lassen" (Fantasia; e. v.: Weimar)		Organ	25^{2}: 170	IV/2: 154	after Z 5264b → BWV 658	00760
659	7.	c.1740	chorale setting "Nun komm, der Heiden Heiland" (Leipzig Chorales 9/18)	G min.	Organ	25^{2}: 114	IV/2: 55	after BWV 659a	00761
659a	7.	1708–1714	chorale setting "Nun komm, der Heiden Heiland" (Fantasia; e. v.: Weimar)		Organ	25^{2}: 172	IV/2: 157	after Z 1174; → BWV 659	00762
660	7.	c.1740	chorale setting "Nun komm, der Heiden Heiland" (Trio; Leipzig Chorales 10/18)	G min.	Organ	25^{2}: 116	IV/2: 59	after BWV 660a	00763
660a	7.	1714–1717	chorale setting "Nun komm, der Heiden Heiland" (Trio; e. v.: Weimar)		Organ	25^{2}: 174	IV/2: 160	after Z 1174; → BWV 660, 660b	00764
660b	7.	1708–1714	chorale setting "Nun komm, der Heiden Heiland" (arrangement)		Organ	25^{2}: 176		by Krebs, J. T. (arr.)?; after BWV 660a	00765
661	7.	c.1740	chorale setting "Nun komm, der Heiden Heiland" (Leipzig Chorales 11/18)	G min.	Organ	25^{2}: 118	IV/2: 62	after BWV 661a	00766
661a	7.	1708–1714	chorale setting "Nun komm, der Heiden Heiland" (e. v.: Weimar)		Organ	25^{2}: 178	IV/2: 164	after Z 1174; → BWV 661	00767
662	7.	c.1740	chorale setting "Allein Gott in der Höh sei Ehr" (Leipzig Chorales 12/18)	A maj.	Organ	25^{2}: 122	IV/2: 67	after BWV 662a	00768
662a	7.	1708–1717	chorale setting "Allein Gott in der Höh sei Ehr" (e. v.: Weimar)		Organ		IV/2: 168	after Z 4457; → BWV 662	00769
663	7.	c.1740	chorale setting "Allein Gott in der Höh sei Ehr" (Leipzig Chorales 13/18)	G maj.	Organ	25^{2}: 125	IV/2: 72	after BWV 663a	00770
663a	7.	1708–1717	chorale setting "Allein Gott in der Höh sei Ehr" (e. v.: Weimar)		Organ	25^{2}: 180	IV/2: 172	after Z 4457; → BWV 663	00771
664	7.	1746–1747	chorale setting "Allein Gott in der Höh sei Ehr" (Trio; Leipzig Chorales 14/18)	A maj.	Organ	25^{2}: 130	IV/2: 79	after BWV 664a–b	00772
664a	7.	1708–1717	chorale setting "Allein Gott in der Höh sei Ehr" (Trio; e. v.: Weimar; fair copy)		Organ	25^{2}: 183	IV/2	after BWV 664b; → BWV 664	00773
664b	7.	1708–1717	chorale setting "Allein Gott in der Höh sei Ehr" (Trio; e. v.: Weimar; sketch)		Organ		IV/2: 179	after Z 4457; → BWV 664(a)	00774
665	7.	1746–1747	chorale setting "Jesus Christus, unser Heiland" (Leipzig Chorales 15/18)	E min.	Organ	25^{2}: 136	IV/2: 87	after BWV 665a	00775
665a	7.	1708–1714	chorale setting "Jesus Christus, unser Heiland" (e. v.: Weimar)		Organ	25^{2}: 188	IV/2: 187	after Z 1576; → BWV 665	00776
666	7.	1708–1748	chorale setting "Jesus Christus, unser Heiland" (alio modo; Leipzig Chorales 16/18)	E min.	Organ	25^{2}: 140	IV/2: 91	after BWV 666a	00777
666a	7.	1708–1714	chorale setting "Jesus Christus, unser Heiland" (alio modo; e. v.: Weimar)		Organ		IV/2: 191	after Z 1576; → BWV 666	00778
667	7.	1747–1748	chorale setting "Komm, Gott Schöpfer, heiliger Geist" (Leipzig Chorales 17/18)	C maj.	Organ	25^{2}: 142	IV/2: 94	after BWV 667a	00779
667a	7.	1708–1717	chorale setting "Komm, Gott Schöpfer, heiliger Geist" (e. v.: Weimar)		Organ		IV/2	after BWV 667b; → BWV 667	00780
667b	7.	1708–1717	chorale setting "Komm, Gott Schöpfer, heiliger Geist" (e. v.: Weimar; sketch)		Organ		IV/2: 194	after Z 295; → BWV 667(a)	00781
668	7.	1747–1748	chorale setting "Vor deinen Thron tret ich hiermit" (fragment; Leipzig Chorales 18/18)	G maj.	Organ	25^{2}: 145	IV/2: 113	after BWV 668a	00782
668a	7.	1708–1748	chorale setting "Wenn wir in höchsten Nöten" (e. v.)		Organ		IV/2: 212	after Z 394; → BWV 668	00783
669	7.	1739	chorale setting "Kyrie, Gott Vater in Ewigkeit" from Clavier-Übung III		Organ	3: 184	IV/4: 16	after Z 8600	00784
670	7.	1739	chorale setting "Christe, aller Welt Trost" from Clavier-Übung III		Organ	3: 186	IV/4: 18	after Z 8600	00785
671	7.	1739	chorale setting "Kyrie, Gott heiliger Geist" from Clavier-Übung III		Organ	3: 190	IV/4: 20	after Z 8600	00786
672	7.	1739	chorale setting "Kyrie, Gott Vater in Ewigkeit" from Clavier-Übung III		Org/man.	3: 194	IV/4: 27	after Z 8600	00787
673	7.	1739	chorale setting "Christe, aller Welt Trost" from Clavier-Übung III		Org/man.	3: 194	IV/4: 28	after Z 8600	00788
674	7.	1739	chorale setting "Kyrie, Gott heiliger Geist" from Clavier-Übung III		Org/man.	3: 196	IV/4: 29	after Z 8600	00789
675	7.	1739	chorale setting "Allein Gott in der Höh sei Ehr" from Clavier-Übung III		Organ	3: 197	IV/4: 30	after Z 4457	00790
676	7.	1739	chorale setting "Allein Gott in der Höh sei Ehr" from Clavier-Übung III		Organ	3: 199	IV/4: 33	after Z 4457; → BWV 676a	00791
677	7.	1739	chorale setting "Allein Gott in der Höh sei Ehr" (Fughetta) from Clavier-Übung III		Org/man.	3: 205	IV/4: 41	after Z 4457	00793
678	7.	1739	chorale setting "Dies sind die heiligen zehen Gebot" from Clavier-Übung III		Organ	3: 206	IV/4: 42	after Z 1951	00794
679	7.	1739	chorale setting "Dies sind die heiligen zehen Gebot" (Fughetta) from Clavier-Übung III		Org/man.	3: 210	IV/4: 49	after Z 1951	00795
680	7.	1739	chorale setting "Wir gläuben all an einen Gott" from Clavier-Übung III		Organ	3: 212	IV/4: 52	after Z 7971	00796
681	7.	1739	chorale setting "Wir gläuben all an einen Gott" (Fughetta) from Clavier-Übung III		Org/man.	3: 216	IV/4: 57	after Z 7971	00797
682	7.	1739	chorale setting "Vater unser im Himmelreich" from Clavier-Übung III		Organ	3: 217	IV/4: 58	after Z 2561	00798
683	7.	1739	chorale setting "Vater unser im Himmelreich" from Clavier-Übung III		Org/man.	3: 223	IV/4: 66	after Z 2561; → BWV 683a	00799
684	7.	1739	chorale setting "Christ unser Herr zum Jordan kam" from Clavier-Übung III		Organ	3: 224	IV/4: 68	after Z 7246	00801
685	7.	1739	chorale setting "Christ unser Herr zum Jordan kam" from Clavier-Übung III		Org/man.	3: 228	IV/4: 73	after Z 7246	00802
686	7.	1739	chorale setting "Aus tiefer Not schrei ich zu dir" from Clavier-Übung III		Organ	3: 229	IV/4: 74	after Z 4437	00803
687	7.	1739	chorale setting "Aus tiefer Not schrei ich zu dir" from Clavier-Übung III		Org/man.	3: 232	IV/4: 78	after Z 4437	00804
688	7.	1739	chorale setting "Jesus Christus, unser Heiland, der von uns den Zorn Gottes wandt" from Clavier-Übung III		Organ	3: 234	IV/4: 81	after Z 1576	00805
689	7.	1739	chorale setting "Jesus Christus, unser Heiland, der von uns den Zorn Gottes wandt" (Fugue) from Clavier-Übung III		Org/man.	3: 239	IV/4: 89	after Z 1576	00806
690	7.	c.1700–1717	chorale setting "Wer nur den lieben Gott lässt walten" (Kirnberger collection No. 1)		Organ	40: 3	IV/3: 98	after Z 2778	00807
691	7.	c.1720 or earlier	Notebook A. M. Bach (1725) No. 11 chorale setting "Wer nur den lieben Gott lässt walten" (WFB No. 3; Kirnb. coll. No. 2)		Organ	40: 4; 43^{2}: 30; 45^{1}: 214	V/5: 6 V/4: 90; IV/3: 98	after Z 2778; → BWV 691a	00808
694	7.	c.1700–1717	chorale setting "Wo soll ich fliehen hin" (Kirnb. coll. No. 5)		Organ	40: 6	IV/3: 103	after Z 2164	00813
695	7.	c.1700–1717	chorale setting "Christ lag in Todesbanden" (Fantasia; Kirnb. coll. No. 6)		Organ	40: 10	IV/3: 20	after Z 7012a; → BWV 695a	00814
695a	7.	1700–1789	chorale setting "Christ lag in Todesbanden" (variant)		Organ	40: 153		after BWV 695	00815
696	7.	c.1700–1717	chorale setting "Christum wir sollen loben schon" (Fughetta; Kirnb. coll. No. 7)		Organ	40: 13	IV/3: 23	after Z 297c	00816
696	7.	c.1700–1717	chorale setting "Was fürchtest du Feind, Herodes, sehr" (Fughetta; Kirnb. coll. No. 7)		Organ	40: 13	IV/3: 23	after Z 297c	00816
697	7.	c.1700–1717	chorale setting "Gelobet seist du, Jesu Christ" (Fughetta; Kirnb. coll. No. 8)		Organ	40: 14	IV/3: 32	after Z 1947	00817
698	7.	c.1700–1717	chorale setting "Herr Christ, der ein'ge Gottes Sohn" (Fughetta; Kirnb. coll. No. 9)		Organ	40: 15	IV/3: 35	after Z 4297a	00818
699	7.	c.1700–1717	chorale setting "Nun komm, der Heiden Heiland" (Fughetta; Kirnb. coll. No. 10)		Organ	40: 16	IV/3: 73	after Z 1174	00819
700	7.	c.1699	chorale setting "Vom Himmel hoch da komm ich her" (Kirnb. coll. No. 11)		Organ	40: 17	IV/3: 92	after Z 346	00820
701	7.	c.1700–1717	chorale setting "Vom Himmel hoch da komm ich her" (Fughetta; Kirnb. coll. No. 12)		Organ	40: 19	IV/3: 96	after Z 346	00821
702	7.	c.1700–1717	chorale setting "Das Jesulein soll doch mein Trost" (Fughetta; Kirnb. coll. No. 13)		Organ	40: 20	IV/3: 45	after Z 7597	00822
703	7.	c.1700–1717	chorale setting "Gottes Sohn ist kommen" (Fughetta; Kirnb. coll. No. 14)		Organ	40: 21	IV/3: 34	after Z 3294	00823
704	7.	c.1700–1717	chorale setting "Lob sei dem allmächtigen Gott" (Fughetta; Kirnb. coll. No. 15)		Organ	40: 22	IV/3: 62	after Z 339	00824
706/1; 706/2	7.	c.1700–1717	chorale setting "Liebster Jesu, wir sind hier" (/2 = alio modo; Kirnb. coll. No. 17)		Organ	40: 25	IV/3: 59	after Z 3498b	00826
707	7.	c.1700–1717	chorale setting "Ich hab mein Sach Gott heimgestellt" (Kirnb. coll. No. 18)		Organ	40: 26	IV/10: 87	after Z 1679	00827
709	7.	c.1700–1717	chorale setting "Herr Jesu Christ, dich zu uns wend" (Kirnb. coll. No. 20)		Organ	40: 30	IV/3: 43	after Z 624	00830
710	7.	c.1700–1717	chorale setting "Wir Christenleut habn jetzund Freud" (Kirnb. coll. No. 21)		Organ	40: 32	IV/3: 100	after Z 2072	00831
711	7.	c.1700–1717	chorale setting "Allein Gott in der Höh sei Ehr" (bicinium; Kirnb. coll. No. 22)		Organ	40: 34	IV/3: 11	after Z 4457	00832
712	7.	c.1708	chorale setting "In dich hab ich gehoffet, Herr" (Kirnb. coll. No. 23)		Organ	40: 36	IV/3: 48	after Z 2461	00833
713	7.	c.1700–1717	chorale setting "Jesu, meine Freude" (Kirnb. coll. No. 24)		Org/man.	40: 38	IV/3: 54	after Z 8032; → BWV 713a	00834
713a	7.	1700–1789	chorale setting "Jesu, meine Freude" (Fantasia; variant)		Organ	40: 155	IV/10: 93	after BWV 713	00835
714	7.	1708–1717	chorale setting "Ach Gott und Herr" (Neumeister Chorales No. 13)		Organ	40: 43	IV/9: 26; IV/3: 3	after Z 2050, 2052	00836
715	7.	1703–1717	chorale setting "Allein Gott in der Höh sei Ehr"		Organ	40: 44	IV/3: 14	after Z 4457	00837
717	7.	1708–1717	chorale setting "Allein Gott in der Höh sei Ehr"		Organ	40: 46	IV/3: 8	after Z 4457	00839
718	7.	1703–1708	chorale setting "Christ lag in Todesbanden"		Organ	40: 52	IV/3: 16	after Z 7012a	00840
719	7.	c.1704	chorale setting "Der Tag, der ist so freudenreich" (Neumeister Chorales No. 1)		Organ	40: 55	IV/9: 2, 72	after Z 7870	00841
720	7.	1709?	chorale setting "Ein feste Burg ist unser Gott"		Organ	40: 57	IV/3: 24	after Z 7377; by Bach, J. Michael?	00842
721	7.	c.1703–1707	chorale setting "Erbarm dich mein, o Herre Gott"		Organ	40: 60	IV/3: 28	after Z 5851	00843
722	7.	1708–1717	chorale setting "Gelobet seist du, Jesu Christ"		Organ	40: 62	IV/3: 31	after BWV 722a	00844
722a	7.	1709?	chorale setting "Gelobet seist du, Jesu Christ" (sketch)		Organ	40: 158	IV/3: 30	after Z 1947; → BWV 722	00845
724	7.	c. 1699	chorale setting "Gott durch deine Güte"		Organ	40: 65	IV/3: 33	after Z 3294; in Andreas-Bach-Buch	00847
724	7.	c. 1699	chorale setting "Gottes Sohn ist kommen"		Organ	40: 65	IV/3: 33	after Z 3294; in Andreas-Bach-Buch	00847
725	7.	c.1700–1717	chorale setting "Herr Gott, dich loben wir"		Organ	40: 66	IV/3: 36	after Z 8652	00848
727	7.	1708–1717	chorale setting "Herzlich tut mich verlangen"		Organ	40: 73	IV/3: 46	after Z 5385a	00850
728	7.	1722–1723 or earlier	Notebook A. M. Bach (1722) No. 8 chorale setting "Jesus, meine Zuversicht"		Organ	43^{2}: 5; 40: 74	V/4: 41; IV/3: 58	after Z 3432b	00851
729	7.	1708–1717	chorale setting "In dulci jubilo"		Organ	40: 74	IV/3: 52	after BWV 729a	00852
729a	7.	1708–1717	chorale setting "In dulci jubilo" (sketch)		Organ	40: 158	IV/3: 50	after Z 4947; → BWV 729	00853
730	7.	1708–1717	chorale setting "Liebster Jesu, wir sind hier"		Organ	40: 76	IV/3: 60	after Z 3498b	00854
731	7.	1708–1717	chorale setting "Liebster Jesu, wir sind hier"		Organ	40: 77	IV/3: 61	after Z 3498b	00855
732	7.	1708–1717	chorale setting "Lobt Gott, ihr Christen, allzugleich"		Organ	40: 78	IV/3: 64	after BWV 732a	00856
732a	7.	1708–1717	chorale setting "Lobt Gott, ihr Christen, allzugleich" (draft)		Organ	40: 159	IV/3: 63	after Z 198; → BWV 732	00857
733	7.	1708–1717	chorale setting "Meine Seele erhebt den Herren" (fugue)		Organ	40: 79	IV/3: 65	after Magnificat peregrini toni; by Krebs, J. L.?	00858
734	7.	1708–1717	chorale setting "Nun freut euch, lieben Christen g'mein"		Organ	40: 160	IV/3: 70	after Z 4429a; → BWV 734a	00859
734a	7.	1708–1789	chorale setting "Es ist gewisslich an der Zeit"		Organ	40: 84	IV/10	after BWV 734; arr. by Scholz?	00860
735	7.	c.1700–1717	chorale setting "Valet will ich dir geben" (Fantasia)		Organ	40: 86	IV/3: 77	after BWV 735a	00861
735a	7.	c.1706	chorale setting "Valet will ich dir geben" (early version)		Organ	40: 161	IV/3: 81	after Z 5404a; → BWV 735	00862
736	7.	1708–1717 or later	chorale setting "Valet will ich dir geben"		Org (V Bc)	40: 90	IV/3: 84	after Z 5404a	00863
737	7.	1703–1707	chorale setting "Vater unser im Himmelreich" (Neumeister Chorales No. 18)		Organ	40: 96	IV/9: 36; IV/3: 90	after Z 2561	00864
738	7.	1708–1717	chorale setting "Vom Himmel hoch, da komm ich her"		Organ	40: 97	IV/3: 94	after BWV 738a	00865
738a	7.	1708–1717	chorale setting "Vom Himmel hoch, da komm ich her" (sketch)		Organ	40: 159	IV/3: 94	after Z 346; → BWV 738	00866
739	7.	c.1704	chorale setting "Wie schön leuchtet der Morgenstern"		Organ	40: 99	IV/10: 2	after Z 8359	00867
741	7.	c.1701	chorale setting "Ach Gott, vom Himmel sieh darein"		Organ	40: 167	IV/3: 4	after Z 4431	00869
742	7.	c.1704	chorale setting "Ach Herr, mich armen Sünder" (Neumeister Chorales No. 14)		Organ		IV/9: 28	after Z 5385a	00870
747	7.	1703–1707 or earlier	chorale setting "Christus, der uns selig macht"		Organ		IV/10: 38	after Z 6283b	00875
753	7.	c.1720	chorale setting "Jesu, meine Freude" (unfinished; WFB No. 5)		Organ	40: 163; 45^{1}: 214	V/5: 8	after Z 8032	00882
764	7.	c.1704–1705	chorale setting "Wie schön leuchtet der Morgenstern"		Organ	40: 164	IV/10: 6	after Z 8359	00893
1085	7.	c.1700–1717	chorale setting "O Lamm Gottes unschuldig"		Organ		IV/3: 76	after Z 4361	01683
1090	7.	c.1704	chorale setting "Wir Christenleut" (Neumeister Chorales No. 2)		Organ		IV/9: 4	after Z 2072	01276
1091	7.	c.1699	chorale setting "Das alte Jahr vergangen ist" (Neumeister Chorales No. 3)		Organ		IV/9: 6	after Z 381c	01277
1092	7.	c.1701	chorale setting "Herr Gott, nun schleuß den Himmel auf" (Neumeister Chorales No. 4)		Organ		IV/9: 8	after Z 7641b	01278
1093	7.	c.1704	chorale setting "Herzliebster Jesu, was hast du verbrochen" (Neumeister Chorales No. 5)		Organ		IV/9: 10	after Z 983	01279
1094	7.	c.1699	chorale setting "O Jesu, wie ist dein Gestalt" (Neumeister Chorales No. 6)		Organ		IV/9: 12	after Z 8360	01280
1095	7.	c.1704	chorale setting "O Lamm Gottes unschuldig" (Neumeister Chorales No. 7)		Organ		IV/9: 14	after Z 4361a	01281
1097	7.	c.1699	chorale setting "Ehre sei dir Christe, der du leidest Not" (Neumeister Chorales No. 9)		Organ		IV/9: 18	after Z 8187h	01283
1098	7.	c.1704	chorale setting "Wir glauben all an einen Gott" (Neumeister Chorales No. 10)		Organ		IV/9: 20	after Z 7971	01284
1099	7.	c.1701	chorale setting "Aus tiefer Not schrei ich zu dir" (Neumeister Chorales No. 11)		Organ		IV/9: 22	after Z 4438	01285
1100	7.	c.1704	chorale setting "Allein zu dir, Herr Jesu Christ" (Neumeister Chorales No. 12)		Organ		IV/9: 24	after Z 7292b	01286
1101	7.	c.1704	chorale setting "Durch Adams Fall ist ganz verderbt" (Neumeister Chorales No. 15)		Organ		IV/9: 30	after Z 7549	01287
1102	7.	c.1706	chorale setting "Du Friedefürst, Herr Jesu Christ" (Neumeister Chorales No. 16)		Organ		IV/9: 33	after Z 4373	01288
1103	7.	1699–1709	chorale setting "Erhalt uns Herr, bei deinem Wort" (Neumeister Chorales No. 17)		Organ		IV/9: 35	after Z 350	01289
1104	7.	1699–1709	chorale setting "Wenn dich Unglück tut greifen an" (Neumeister Chorales No. 19)		Organ		IV/9: 38	after Z 499	01290
1105	7.	c.1701	chorale setting "Jesu, meine Freude" (Neumeister Chorales No. 20)		Organ		IV/9: 39	after Z 8032	01291
1106	7.	c.1704	chorale setting "Gott ist mein Heil, mein Hilf und Trost" (Neumeister Chorales No. 21)		Organ		IV/9: 40	after Z 4421	01292
1107	7.	c.1704	chorale setting "Jesu, meines Lebens Leben" (Neumeister Chorales No. 22)		Organ		IV/9: 42	after Z 6794	01293
1108	7.	c.1704	chorale setting "Als Jesus Christus in der Nacht" (Neumeister Chorales No. 23)		Organ		IV/9: 44	after Z 258	01294
1109	7.	1699–1709	chorale setting "Ach Gott, tu dich erbarmen" (Neumeister Chorales No. 24)		Organ		IV/9: 46	after Z 7228c	01295
1110	7.	c.1704	chorale setting "O Herre Gott, dein göttlich Wort" (Neumeister Chorales No. 25)		Organ		IV/9: 48	after Z 5690	01296
1111	7.	c.1701	chorale setting "Nun lasset uns den Leib begraben" (Neumeister Chorales No. 26)		Organ		IV/9: 50	after Z 352	01297
1112	7.	c.1699	chorale setting "Christus, der ist mein Leben" (Neumeister Chorales No. 27)		Organ		IV/9: 52	after Z 132	01298
1113	7.	c.1699	chorale setting "Ich hab mein Sach Gott heimgestellt" (Neumeister Chorales No. 28)		Organ		IV/9: 54	after Z 1679	01299
1114	7.	c.1701	chorale setting "Herr Jesu Christ, du höchstes Gut" (Neumeister Chorales No. 29)		Organ		IV/9: 56	after Z 4486	01300
1115	7.	c.1701	chorale setting "Herzlich lieb hab ich dich, o Herr" (Neumeister Chorales No. 30)		Organ		IV/9: 58	after Z 8326	01301
1116	7.	c.1701	chorale setting "Was Gott tut, das ist wohlgetan" (Neumeister Chorales No. 31)		Organ		IV/9: 60	after Z 5629	01302
1117	7.	c.1701	chorale setting "Alle Menschen müssen sterben" (Neumeister Chorales No. 32)		Organ		IV/9: 62	after Z 6779a	01303
1118	7.	c.1701	chorale setting "Werde munter, mein Gemüte" (Neumeister Chorales No. 34)		Organ		IV/9: 66	after Z 6551	01304
1119	7.	c.1699	chorale setting "Wie nach einer Wasserquelle" (Neumeister Chorales No. 35)		Organ		IV/9: 68	after Z 1294	01305
1120	7.	c.1704	chorale setting "Christ, der du bist der helle Tag" (Neumeister Chorales No. 36)		Organ		IV/9: 70	after Z 384	01306
957	7.	c.1701	chorale setting "Machs mit mir, Gott, nach deiner Güt" (Neumeister Chorales No. 33; a.k.a. Fugue = first half in later arr.)	G maj.	Organ	42: 203	IV/9: 64, 74	after Z 2383	01134
766	7.	c.1706	chorale setting "Christ, der du bist der helle Tag"		Organ	40: 107	IV/1: 114	after Z 384	00895
767	7.	c.1708	chorale setting "O Gott, du frommer Gott"		Organ	40: 114	IV/1: 122	after Z 5138	00896
768	7.	1708–1717 or earlier	chorale setting "Sei gegrüßet, Jesu gütig"		Organ	40: 122	IV/1: 132, 152	after Z 3889b	00897
769	7.	c.1747–1748	chorale setting "Vom Himmel hoch da komm ich her'" (canonic variations; print version)		Organ	40: 137	IV/2: 197	after Z 346; → BWV 769a	00898
769a	7.	c.1747–1748	chorale setting "Vom Himmel hoch da komm ich her" (canonic variations; autograph)		Organ		IV/2: 98	after BWV 769	00899
770	7.	c.1704	chorale setting "Ach, was soll ich Sünder machen"		Organ	40: 189	IV/1: 104	after Z 3574	00900

== BWV Anhang ==
Various lost, doubtful and spurious organ works are included in the BWV Anhang:

- BWV Anh. 42–79
- BWV Anh. 171–178
- BWV Anh. 200, 206, 208, 213

== Recordings ==
- Bach, Johann Sebastian; Stockmeier, Wolfgang (1997), Das Orgelwerk (20-CD box set), Hamburg: Art & Music, OCLC 163302495
