= Toccata, Adagio and Fugue in C major, BWV 564 =

Organ composition by Johann Sebastian Bach

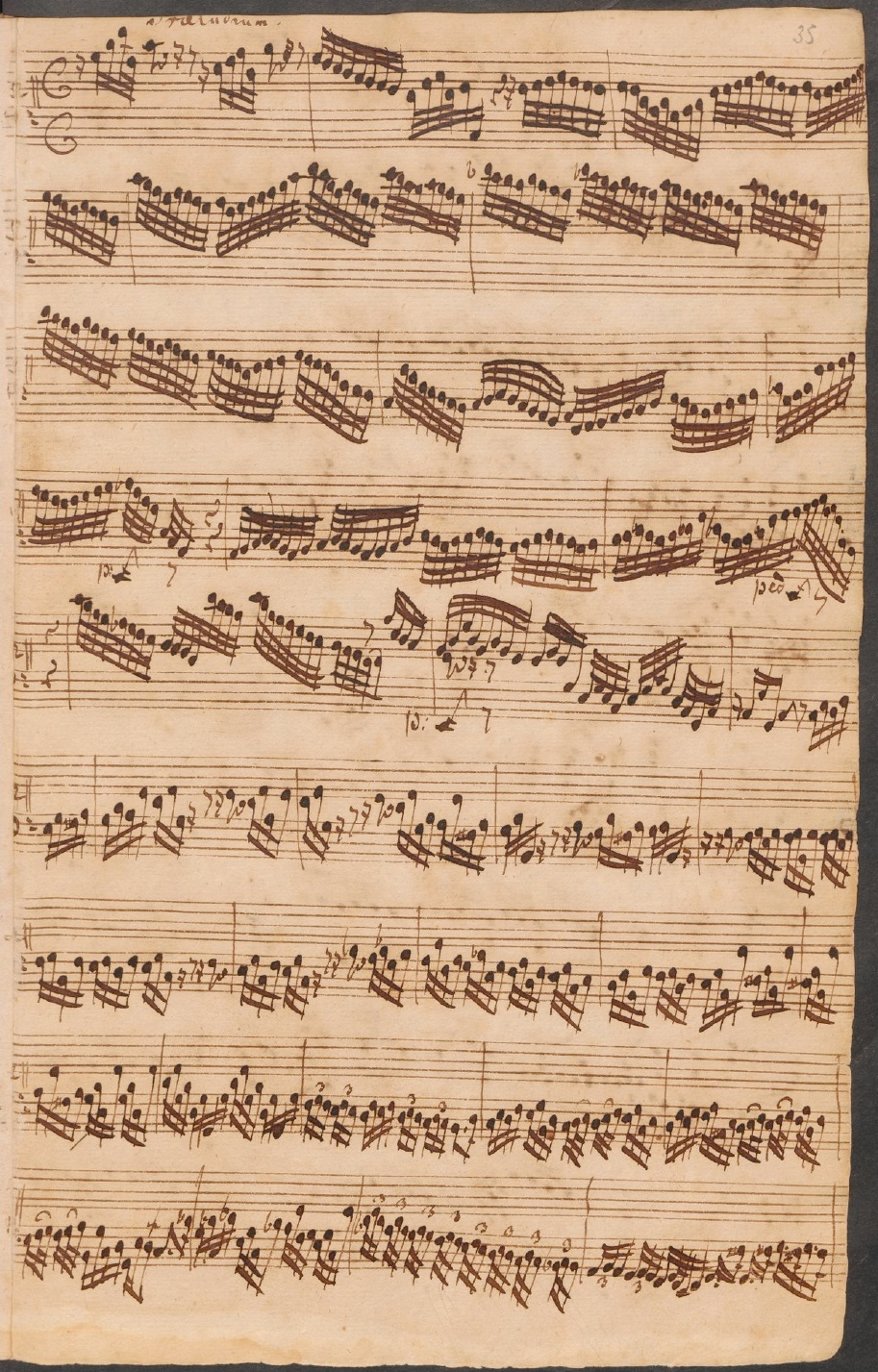
The opening of the BWV 564 Toccata, in the hand of Johann Peter Kellner - showcasing the elaborate manual passage-work, and most of the virtuoso pedal solo

Toccata, Adagio and Fugue in C, BWV 564
U.S. Marine Band plays this piece in its entirety.

Toccata part of BWV 564
Kerstin Wolf Playing Toccata part of BWV 564, 2013

Adagio part of BWV 564
Kerstin Wolf Playing Adagio part of BWV 564, 2013

Fuge part of BWV 564
Kerstin Wolf Playing Fuge part of BWV 564, 2013

Toccata, Adagio, and Fugue in C major (BWV 564) is an organ composition by Johann Sebastian Bach. As is the case with most other organ works by Bach, the autograph score does not survive. The earliest manuscript copies were probably made in 1719–1727. The title of the piece in these copies is given, as expected of organ literature of the time, simply as Toccata in C major (or more precisely, Toccata ped: ex C in one source and Toccata ex C♮ pedaliter, referring to the obbligato pedal part). The piece is an early work, probably composed in the mid-to-late Weimar years, i.e. 1710–1717. It shares some similarities with other toccatas composed around the same time, such as BWV 538, BWV 540, and others: all show the influence of concerto style and form.

== Composition ==
=== Toccata ===
The work begins with an updated and extended form of the old prelude-type, manual passaggio followed by a pedal solo, and a motivic-contrapuntal section. Bach's extended passaggio which opens BWV 564 may have been inspired by Buttstett's preludes; both the rhetorical rests followed by returns to the tonic and the single pedal notes are part of the older tradition as well. The following pedal solo, however, is unique in organ literature: it is the longest known pedal introduction, reaching far beyond the scope of Bach's models (Buxtehude, Böhm, and others) or his own earlier works (e.g. the pedal solo in BWV 549). The full-voiced section that follows elaborates on motives first introduced in the pedal solo. Various scholars have noted how the construction of this first movement is reminiscent of that of a concerto, if the opening manual and pedal passages are taken as "solos" and the closing contrapuntal section as a "tutti".

=== Adagio ===
The second movement is again in two sections, one marked Adagio and another marked Grave. The insertion of a middle slow movement in an organ work was unusual for Bach, although traces of this idea can be found in other works from the same period: for example, a surviving early version of Prelude and Fugue in C Major, BWV 545, contains a slow Trio, which was removed from the final version, but found its way into one of the late organ trio sonatas, BWV 529. The Adagio is a melody made of short phrases, characteristic of early Bach, over what may be seen as a realized continuo part. The music has been compared to Giuseppe Torelli's Concerto in C major Op. 8 No. 1, but in Bach's oeuvre, this Adagio stands alone and has no parallels. The abundance of Neapolitan sixths and quasi-pizzicato pedal suggests Italian influence. The Adagio flows seamlessly into the short Grave section, which, through italianate durezze chromatic progressions, enlarged with several instances of diminished seventh chords suspended over the next chord, leads back to the tonic.

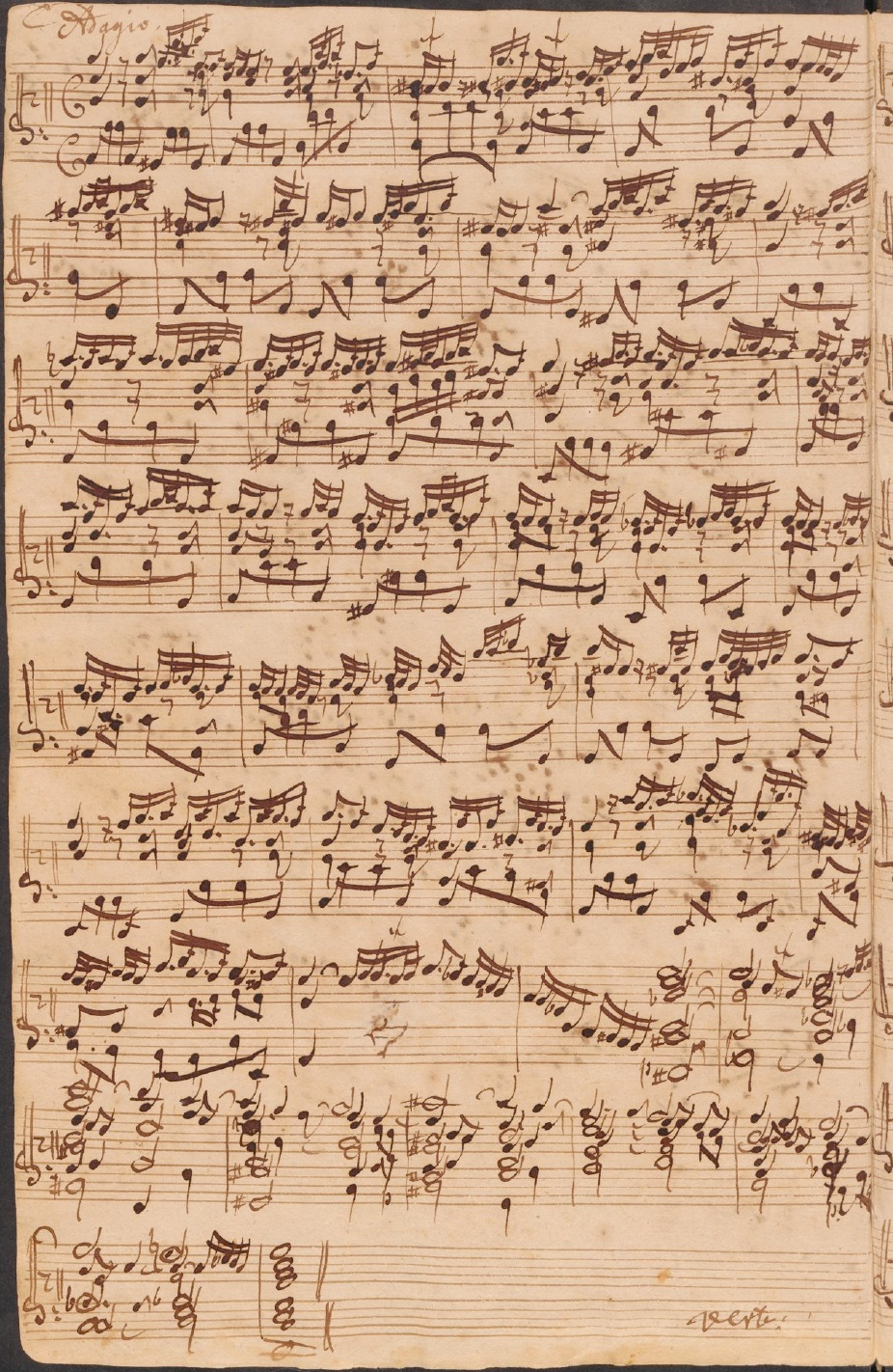
The Adagio, in the hand of J.P. Kellner. Modern manuscripts separate the right-hand melody, left-hand accompaniment, and pedal bass-line into three separate staves

=== Fugue ===
The third movement is a four-voice fugue in 6/8. It includes a countersubject typical of permutation fugues, which, unusually, engages in dialogue with the subject. Several features of the fugue suggest that it represented a considerable advance for Bach, especially considering that there are middle entries as far as the mediant and the dominant of the dominant. Somewhat unusually for Bach, the fugue includes very few episodes, the longest being the coda of the piece, which is based on various style brisé figures.

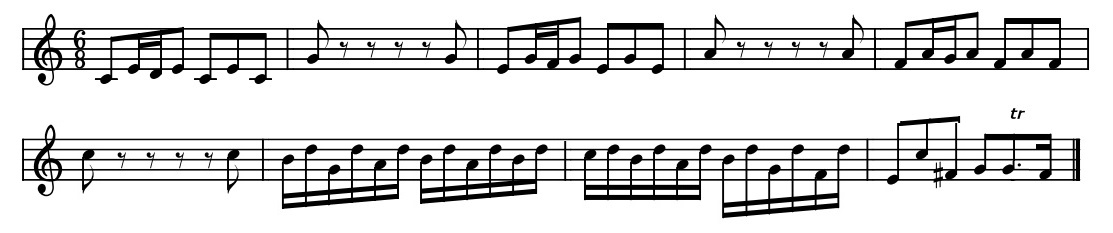
The fugue subject

== Influence and Transcriptions ==
BWV 564 influenced a number of composers both during Bach's lifetime and after his death. Bach's pupil Johann Ludwig Krebs imitated the work in his Prelude and Fugue in C major (leaving out, however, the slow movement), while in the 20th century, Ferruccio Busoni published a transcription of BWV 564 for the piano (1900; one of many Bach transcriptions by the same author), and the work influenced Busoni's own Toccata for Piano (1920). The Adagio movement was transcribed for symphony orchestra by Leopold Stokowski, and was performed and recorded between 1927 and 1939 by the Philadelphia Orchestra, which he conducted.

== In popular culture ==
- The Adagio is played during a satanic ritual scene in the 1934 Karloff/Lugosi film The Black Cat.
