= Prelude and Fugue in C major, BWV 531 =

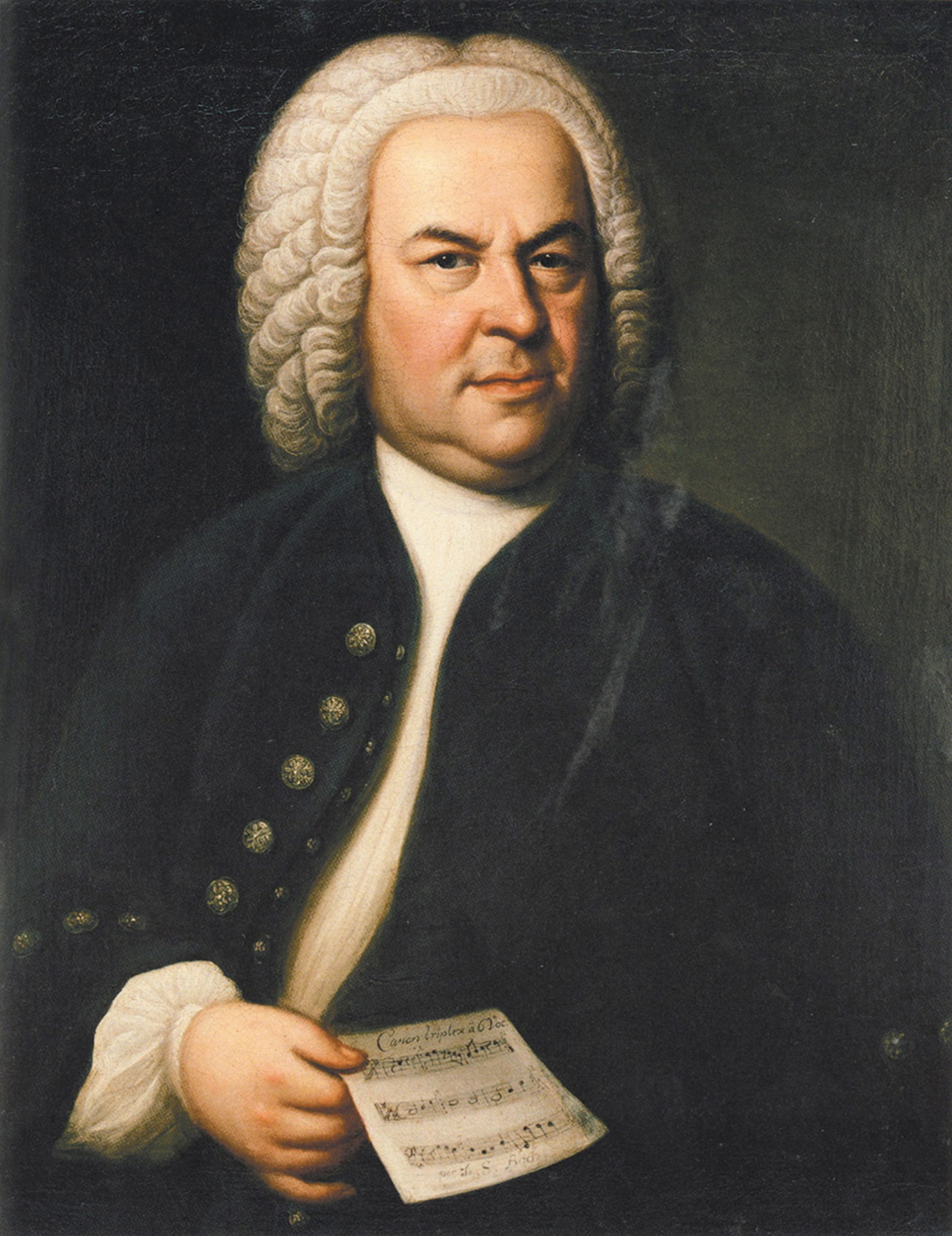
Johann Sebastian Bach, the composer of the Prelude and Fugue in C major, BWV 531

Johann Sebastian Bach's Prelude and Fugue in C major, BWV 531, is a prelude and fugue in C major, written for the organ c. 1707.

== Composition ==
Unlike most of his other organ preludes and fugues, the Prelude and Fugue in C major was written when Bach was in Arnstadt. Once he arrived there in 1703, he immediately fell in love with the Neue Kirche (now renamed in commemoration to Bach the Bachkirche.) He would secure his job as church organist at the Neue Kirche a few weeks after playing in the church. It is here where he met his future first wife, Maria Barbara Bach.

== Structure ==
=== Prelude ===
In the prelude, the first 9 measures are played with solo pedals alone, with a recurring sixteenth-note figure culminating in an unusual for the time pedal trill. The manuals then come in with a sixteenth-note figure. In the twenty-sixth measure, a 5 measure phrase of diatonic parallel sixths in the manuals and a pedal tone in the pedals occurs. In the 38th measure to the end of the Prelude, the right hand plays a fast, fantasia-like passage, with fast descending scales culminating in a loud C major chord.

=== Fugue ===
The fugue begins with the subject in the soprano voice, with the entirety of the subject being in sixteenth notes. The subject is two measures long. The alto voice is then introduced, transposed down a fifth. Then, the subject is introduced in the tenor voice, down a fourth. In this fugue, the pedals never play the subject as it was originally introduced in the soprano voice, but only as a fragment.
