= Wir glauben all an einen Gott =

Lutheran hymn

- Hymn by Martin Luther
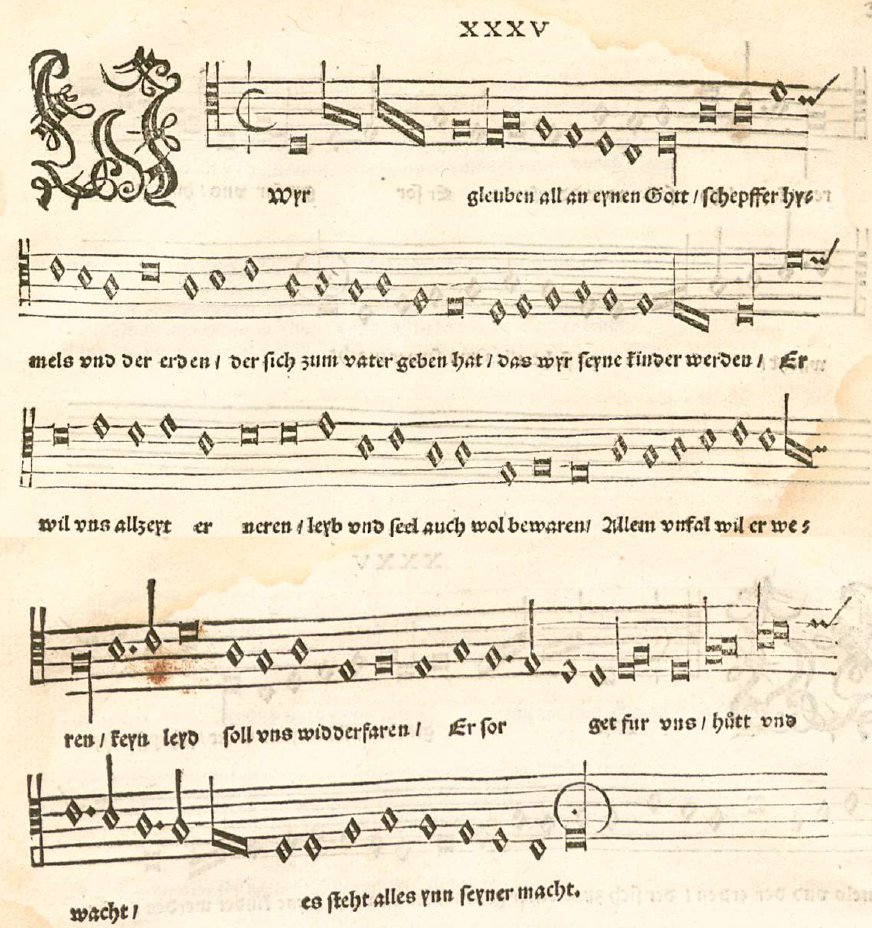
- The hymn in the chorale hymnal Eyn geystlich Gesangk Buchleyn
- Catalogue: Zahn 7971
- Text: by Martin Luther
- Language: German
- Based on: Nicene Creed
- Published: 1524

"Wir glauben all an einen Gott" (We all believe in one God) is a Lutheran hymn, a paraphrase of the creed, by Martin Luther and first published in Johann Walter's chorale hymnal Eyn geystlich Gesangk Buchleyn. The hymn was used in several musical settings, including Kleine Geistliche Konzerte I, SWV 303, by Heinrich Schütz, and Johann Sebastian Bach's Clavier-Übung III, BWV 680 and BWV 681. The Zahn number of its hymn tune is 7971.

== Bibliography ==
- Wilhelm Lucke: Digitalisat Wir glauben all an einen Gott. In: D. Martin Luthers Werke. Kritische Gesamtausgabe, vol 35, Weimar 1923, pp 172–177
- Robin A. Leaver: Wir glauben all an einen Gott. In: Derselbe: Luther’s Liturgical Music, Grand Rapids MI 2007, S. 122–127 (, p. 122, at Google Books).
