= Fantasia and Fugue in C minor, BWV 562 =

The Fantasia and Fugue in C minor, BWV 562 is a relatively short piece written for the organ by Johann Sebastian Bach. Bach began the composition during his time in Weimar, and an unfinished fugue, probably by Bach, was added in his later life. The piece features a heavily appoggiatura-laden harmony.

== Composition ==
Bach was hired in 1708 by the ruling duke of Saxe-Weimar, Wilhelm Ernst, as an organist and member of the court orchestra; he was particularly encouraged to make use of his unique talents with the organ. During his tenure at Weimar his fame as an organist grew, and many students of the organ visited him to hear him play and to learn from his technique. The composer also wrote many of his greatest organ works during the period, including the Toccata and Fugue in D minor, BWV 565 and the Prelude and Fugue in E major, BWV 566. The Fantasia and Fugue in C minor was begun during this period, as a lone fantasia in the title key. The fugue was added in 1745, most likely by Bach, but possibly by one of his students or sons. This piece is one of a few by Bach with a considerable period between the composition of its component sections.

== Analysis ==
The whole piece lasts about six minutes, and comprises an 81-bar fantasia and an unfinished fugue, of which 27 bars are written. The fantasia has a very imposing structure and sound, the feel of which is created by the piece's one-measure generative theme. This theme passes between five contrapuntal voices of the organ, with occasional movement into new ideas; even the pedal bass is used for the theme. The theme contains many appoggiaturas, which provide the piece with a slight virtuosic feel. The fugue is written in 6/4 time and uses a simple half–quarter rhythm. It ends abruptly in the middle of the 27th bar after the exposition of the five voices is completed and a stretto passage begins.
