= Fantasia and Fugue in C minor, BWV 537 =

The Fantasia and Fugue in C minor, BWV 537 is a piece for the organ written by Johann Sebastian Bach. It was composed during the composer's second period of residence in Weimar.

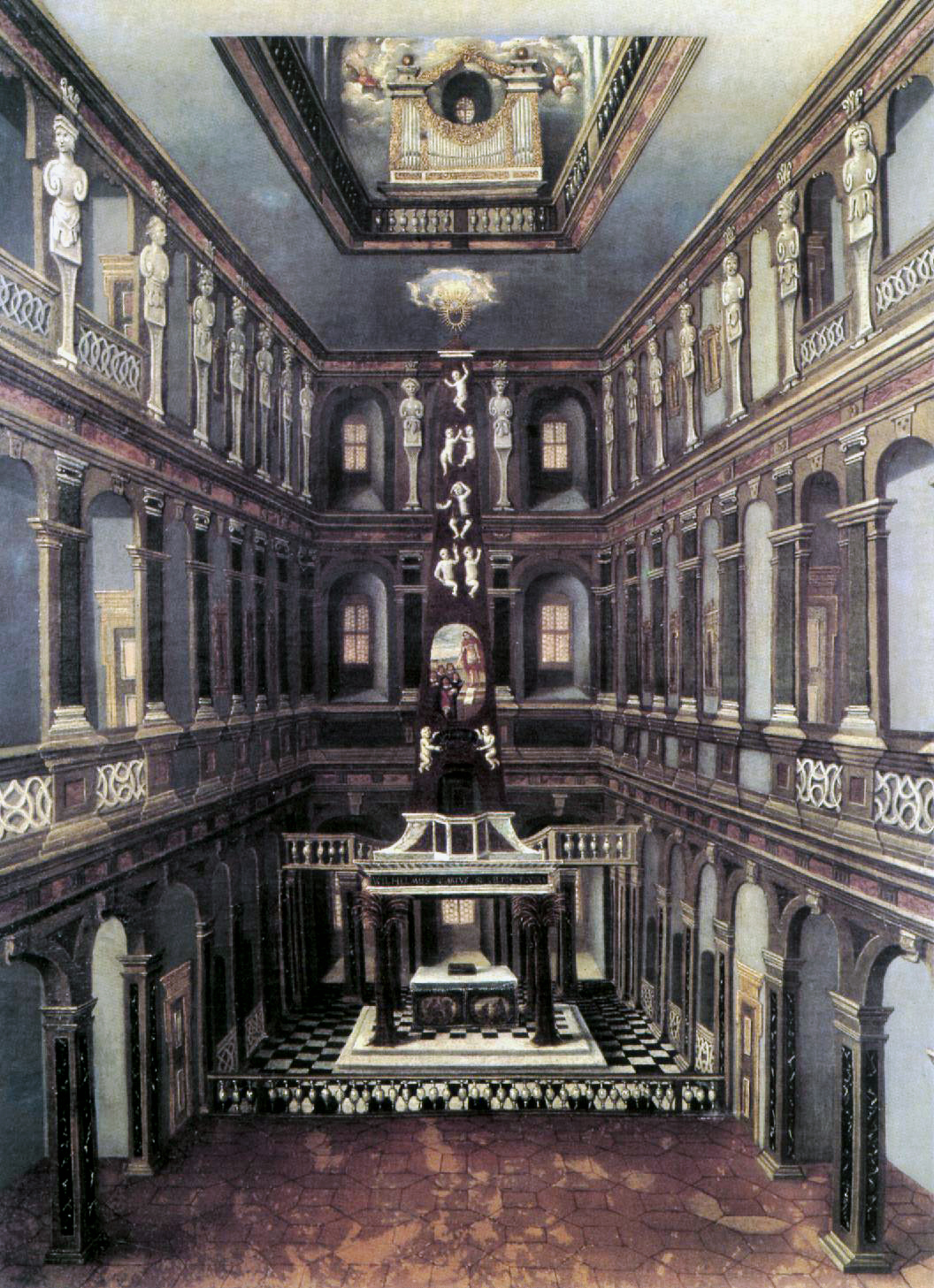
The chapel of the castle at Weimar

== Background of Composition ==
During his life, Bach had two tenures in Weimar, then a town with a population of only about 5000, but possessing a strong cultural tradition. His second tenure began in 1708, when he left a post as a church organist in Mühlhausen to serve as an organist in the chapel of Weimar's ruling duke, Wilhelm Ernst. He composed many of his organ works at Weimar, including the Orgelbüchlein, concerto transcriptions, and some fugues, although in the case of Bach's fugues it is often difficult to identify when they were composed.

== Analysis ==
The combined length of the fantasia and the fugue is about eight minutes; the fantasia is written in 6/4 time, while the fugue is in 2/2. The fantasia of the piece is quite lush and very ornate, consisting of two unequal halves that both feature the same two basic musical ideas, an imitative dotted-rhythm tune, and a leaping eighth-note form, which is also in imitation, initiated by the pedals. Unlike many of its contemporaries, it features no cadenza-like passage in which performers could show off their virtuosity. The fugue uses a steady theme which repeats the same note four times in a row, and so can be easily recognised each time that it reappears. The total length of the fugue is 130 contrapuntal bars.

== Influence of the work ==
During his period in Weimar his fame as an organist grew, and he was visited by students of the organ to hear him play and to try to learn from his technique.

The piece appeared in 1867 in the first complete edition of the composer's works, the Bach-Gesellschaft-Ausgabe. The volume in question was devoted to organ music and edited by Wilhelm Rust.

=== Transcription ===
This piece was transcribed by Edward Elgar. He had a cordial friendship with Richard Strauss dating back to the German premiere of Elgar's The Dream of Gerontius in Düsseldorf in 1901. They met in 1920, eager to heal the rift caused by the First World War. At the meeting, Elgar proposed that they orchestrate this work by Bach. Strauss would orchestrate the Fantasia and Elgar would work on the Fugue. Elgar completed his section in the spring of 1921, but Strauss never kept his part of the agreement. Elgar proceeded to orchestrate the Fantasia as well, and the final combined orchestration was first performed in the 1922 Three Choirs Festival, being held in Gloucester; the rendition was well received.
