= Sei gegrüßet, Jesu gütig, BWV 768 =

1705 chorale partita for organ by Johann Sebastian Bach

Sei gegrüßet, Jesu gütig
- by Johann Sebastian Bach
- Key: G minor
- Catalogue: BWV 768
- Genre: Baroque
- Form: Chorale and variations
- Composed: c. 1705
- Duration: 20 minutes
- Scoring: Organ

Sei gegrüßet, Jesu gütig, BWV 768, also known as Partite diverse sopra "Sei gegrüßet, Jesu gütig", is a chorale partita for organ by Johann Sebastian Bach.

== History ==
The work consists of a chorale and eleven short variations written on it. This is one of Bach's earlier works, dating from around 1705, when the young composer was influenced by the style of the variations of Georg Böhm, organist of St. John's Church in Lüneburg, where Bach was a student. Dieterich Buxtehude is another probable source of inspiration. Of Bach's chorale partitas for organ, this is the longest.

Bach composed the initial chorale by taking the old traditional melody of "Sei gegrüßet, Jesu gütig", then presented a series of variations according to different styles. Five of the eleven variations require an organ with pedals. The melody of the original hymn is usually present in the soprano part. Each variation is developed based on a rhythmic motif or theme.

Greater descriptions of the widely varying styles of these variations are written by Philipp Spitta and by Stainton de B. Taylor. Both commentators posit that some of the variations were written at a later date, based on the greater adherence to Böhm's style in the earlier variations and the increased compositional freedom exhibited in the later ones. Peter Williams provides a more detailed musicological analysis of each variation, and argues that the text of the chorale "O Jesu, du edle Gabe," a Communion hymn, corresponds with Bach's music more closely than the text of "Sei gegrüßet, Jesu gütig."

== Structure ==
1. Chorale
2. Variation I (a 2 Clav.)
3. Variation II
4. Variation III
5. Variation IV
6. Variation V
7. Variation VI
8. Variation VII (a 2 Clav. e Ped.)
9. Variation VIII
10. Variation IX (a 2 Clav. e Ped.)
11. Variation X (a 2 Clav. e Ped.)
12. Variation XI (a 5 voci, in Organo pleno)

A complete performance lasts about twenty minutes.
