= Toccata and Fugue in F major, BWV 540 =

Musical piece by Johann Sebastian Bach

BWV 540 played by Andreas Arand at the Kreuzbergkirche in Bonn

The Toccata and Fugue in F major, BWV 540, is an organ work written by Johann Sebastian Bach, potentially dating from the composer's time in Weimar, or in Leipzig.

== History ==
No firm date can be established for the composition, and it has even been conjectured that the 2 parts were composed separately, with the toccata being a potentially more mature piece. Williams however describes that the differing Affekt of the two parts does not pose any problem to the hypothesis that the whole work was composed at the same period. This conception of "complementary movements" was even a favourite of Bach's, and the dramatic nature of the toccata as contrasted to the counterpoint of the fugue should, as Peter Williams writes, "not be misunderstood as mere discrepancy". Because of the range of the pedal parts, the toccata may have been written for a performance, around 1713, at the Weißenfels organ, with its pedal going up to F.

== Music ==
=== Toccata ===
The toccata starts with a large linear canon (first 6 bars shown above) over a pedal point in F major. It is then followed by a pedal solo based upon material from the canon. The canon is reiterated with some variations in the dominant in C major. This time the hands are switched, and the left hand leads the right. This is again followed by a long pedal solo. The two large canon flourishes cover 108 measures of the composition. The pedal solos cover 60 measures. The concerto movement exhibits a seven-part structure. The canons and pedal solos effect the departure from the home key of F to the dominant C, and the rest of the movement, with its concertante 3-part imitation and "proto-waltzes", constitute the harmonic return. This formal pattern is unique within all of Bach's works.

The Toccata (as a prelude) is proportionally the largest of all Bach's works in the format of prelude-fugue. It is often treated as a show piece, with the ensuing fugue omitted. The Toccata's rhythmic signature suggests a passepied or a musette, although the large scale of the movement does not support these characterizations.

Nor does the harmonic complexity of the composition; 45 measures after the second pedal solo there is a dominant chord which resolves deceptively to the third-inversion secondary dominant of the Neapolitan chord. In particular, the doubled root is found to move outward in contrary chromatic motion to a major 9th; in the bass by a descending half tone, far from the expected fifth. Bach implements this deceptive cadence three times in the piece; it would not become idiomatic until Chopin and Tchaikovsky.

=== Fugue ===
The first subject (entries in the tenor, alto and soprano voices shown above) of the fugue is chromatic and ornamental. The second subject has many modulation shifts and is sometimes initially presented as the counter-subject of the first. The Fugue is Bach's only thorough-going double fugue, where two subjects are exposed in separate sections and then combined. The effect is enhanced by the increasing rhythmic activity of the second subject and by the more frequent use of modulation in the final section of the fugue.

The bravura of the F major toccata, with its pedal solos and manual virtuosity, contrasts with the sober opening of the Fugue. Both represent two diverse aspects of Italian influence: the motoric rhythms and sequential passagework of the Toccata, and the traditional alla breve counterpoint of the Fugue, with its chromaticism, harmonic suspensions, and uninterrupted succession of subjects and answers. These techniques are very similar to those used in the "Dorian" Toccata and Fugue in D minor, BWV 538.

== See also ==
- Other Toccata and Fugues

== Notes ==
=== Sources ===
- Williams, Peter F. (1985), The Organ Music of J. S. Bach, vol. 1 (1st paperback ed.), Cambridge: Cambridge University Press, pp. 103–112, ISBN 9780521317009
