= Prelude (Toccata) and Fugue in E major, BWV 566 =

Musical piece by Johann Sebastian Bach

Prelude (Toccata) and Fugue in (C or) E major, BWV 566 is an organ work written by Johann Sebastian Bach probably during his four-month stay at Lübeck or afterwards in the winter of 1705–1706. It comprises five sections and is an early work in grand form of Bach.

Its compositional form resembles that of Praeludia by Danish-German composer Dieterich Buxtehude. The first section alternates manual or pedal cadenzas with dense suspended chords. The second is a fugue with much repetition following the circle of fifths. The third section is a brief flourish for manuals, ending with an even briefer pedal cadenza punctuated with nine-voice chords. The fourth section, in 3/4 time, is a second fugue with a rhythmic subject resembling the theme of the first fugue immediately followed by the fifth and final section that opens with a virtuous pedal-solo.

Bach also wrote a transposed version of the piece in C major (BWV 566a), to play on organs tuned in meantone where E major would sound discordant due to the tuning of the organ (with a very sharp D♯). Various recordings of the C major version exist mainly on historic instruments, for example Ton Koopman's recording on the Schnitger organ in Hamburg's Jacobikirche, and Marie-Claire Alain's recording on the Silbermann organ at Freiberg Cathedral. Both have a high pitch leaving the "concert" pitch up to one tone higher than modern pitch, where the temperament is significantly unequal to merit playing it away from E major. Modern organs or those tuned to a more equal temperament do not have this need.

The C major version is known nowadays through manuscript copies by J. Tobias Krebs and J. Peter Kellner.

== See also ==
- Other toccata and fugues
