= Toccata and Fugue in D minor, BWV 565 =

Organ music by Johann Sebastian Bach

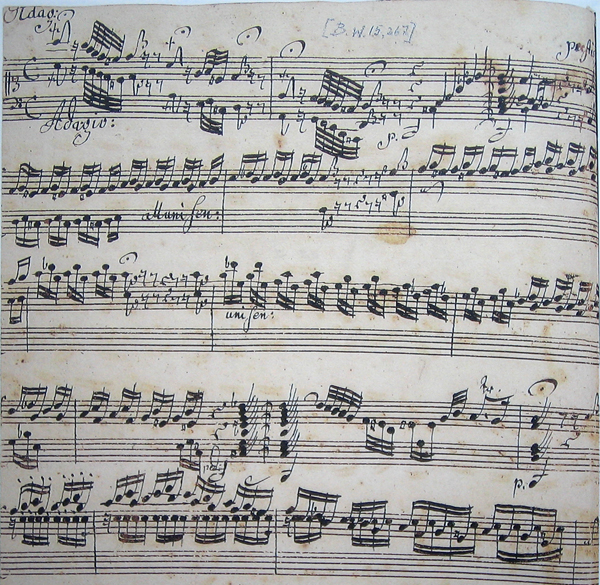
Beginning of BWV 565 in Johannes Ringk's manuscript, which is, as far as known, the only extant 18th-century copy of the work

Toccata and Fugue in D minor, BWV 565
Performed by Ashtar Moïra on organ

The Toccata and Fugue in D minor, BWV 565, is a piece of organ music from the Baroque period traditionally attributed to the German composer Johann Sebastian Bach. Written between 1704 and the 1750s, it is one of the most famous and widely recognised works in the organ repertoire. The composition opens with an improvisatory, multi-section toccata characterised by dramatic flourishes and parallel octaves, moves into a strict four-voice fugue, and concludes with a free-form recitativo-marked coda. Structurally, it exemplifies the stylus phantasticus typical of the north German organ school.

Because Bach's original autograph score is lost, the piece survives primarily through an undated, mid-18th-century manuscript copy by the scribe Johannes Ringk. The work remained obscure until its first publication in 1833 during the early Bach Revival, largely championed by the composer Felix Mendelssohn, who performed it to critical acclaim in 1840. In the 20th century, its popularity grew significantly through transcriptions for other mediums, most notably Leopold Stokowski's 1927 orchestral arrangement. This version was featured as the opening segment of Walt Disney's 1940 animated feature film Fantasia, securing the piece's place in global popular culture.

The composition has generated diverse, often conflicting musicological analyses. While historically interpreted as program music depicting a storm, its abstract treatment in Fantasia highlighted its qualities as absolute music. Furthermore, its precise origin remains a subject of debate. In 1981, the British musicologist Peter Williams questioned Bach's authorship, suggesting the work might be a later pastiche or an organ arrangement of a lost solo violin piece. While a minority of scholars have proposed alternative creators like Johann Ludwig Krebs or Johann Peter Kellner, prominent authorities such as Christoph Wolff defend the traditional attribution to Bach, and the piece remains firmly positioned under his name in the Bach-Werke-Verzeichnis.

== History ==
The only extant near-contemporary source for BWV 565 is an undated copy by Johannes Ringk. According to the description provided by the Berlin State Library, where the manuscript is kept, and similar bibliographic descriptions, e.g. in the RISM catalogue, Ringk created his copy between 1740 and 1760. As far as is known, Ringk produced his first copy of a Bach score in 1730 when he was 12. According to Dietrich Kilian, who edited BWV 565 for the New Bach Edition, Ringk made his copy of the Toccata and Fugue between 1730 and 1740. In his critical commentary for Breitkopf & Härtel's 21st-century revised edition of the score, Jean-Claude Zehnder narrows the time of origin of the manuscript down to around the middle of the first half of the 1730s, based on an analysis of the evolution of Ringk's handwriting. At the time Ringk was a student of Bach's former student Johann Peter Kellner at Gräfenroda, and probably faithfully copied what his teacher put before him. There are some errors in the score such as note values not adding up to fill a measure correctly. Such defects show a carelessness deemed typical of Kellner, who left over 60 copies of works by Bach.

The title page of Ringk's manuscript writes the title of the work in Italian as Toccata con Fuga, names J. S. Bach, and indicates its tonality as "ex. d. #.", which is usually seen as the key signature being D minor. However, in Ringk's manuscript the staves have no ♭ symbol at the key (which would later become the standard way to write down a piece in D minor). Most modern score editions of BWV 565 use the D minor key signature, unlike Ringk's manuscript. Another piece listed as Bach's was also known as Toccata and Fugue in D minor, which received the "Dorian" nickname, that qualifier being effectively used to distinguish it from BWV 565.

Ringk manuscript
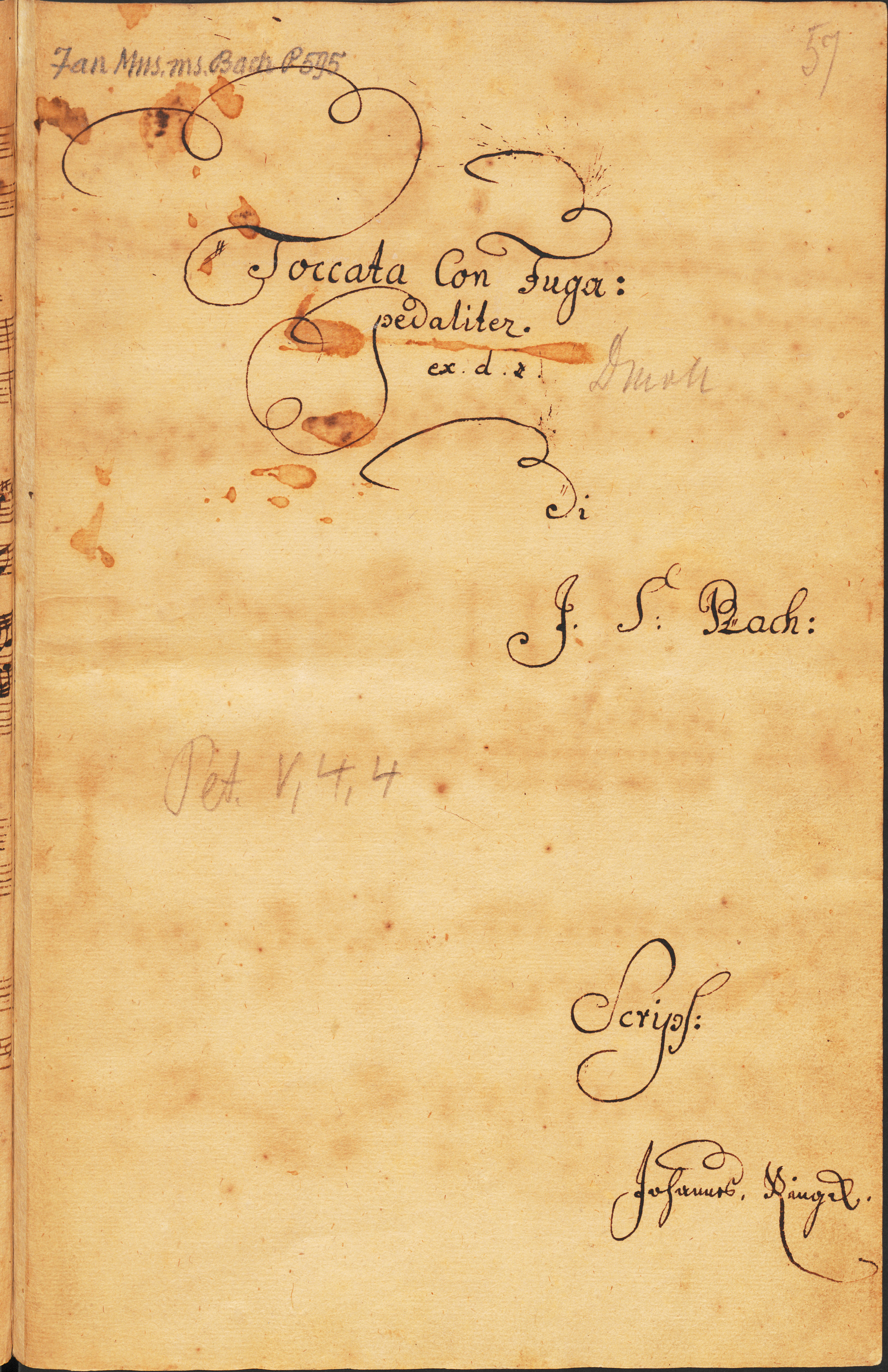
Title page

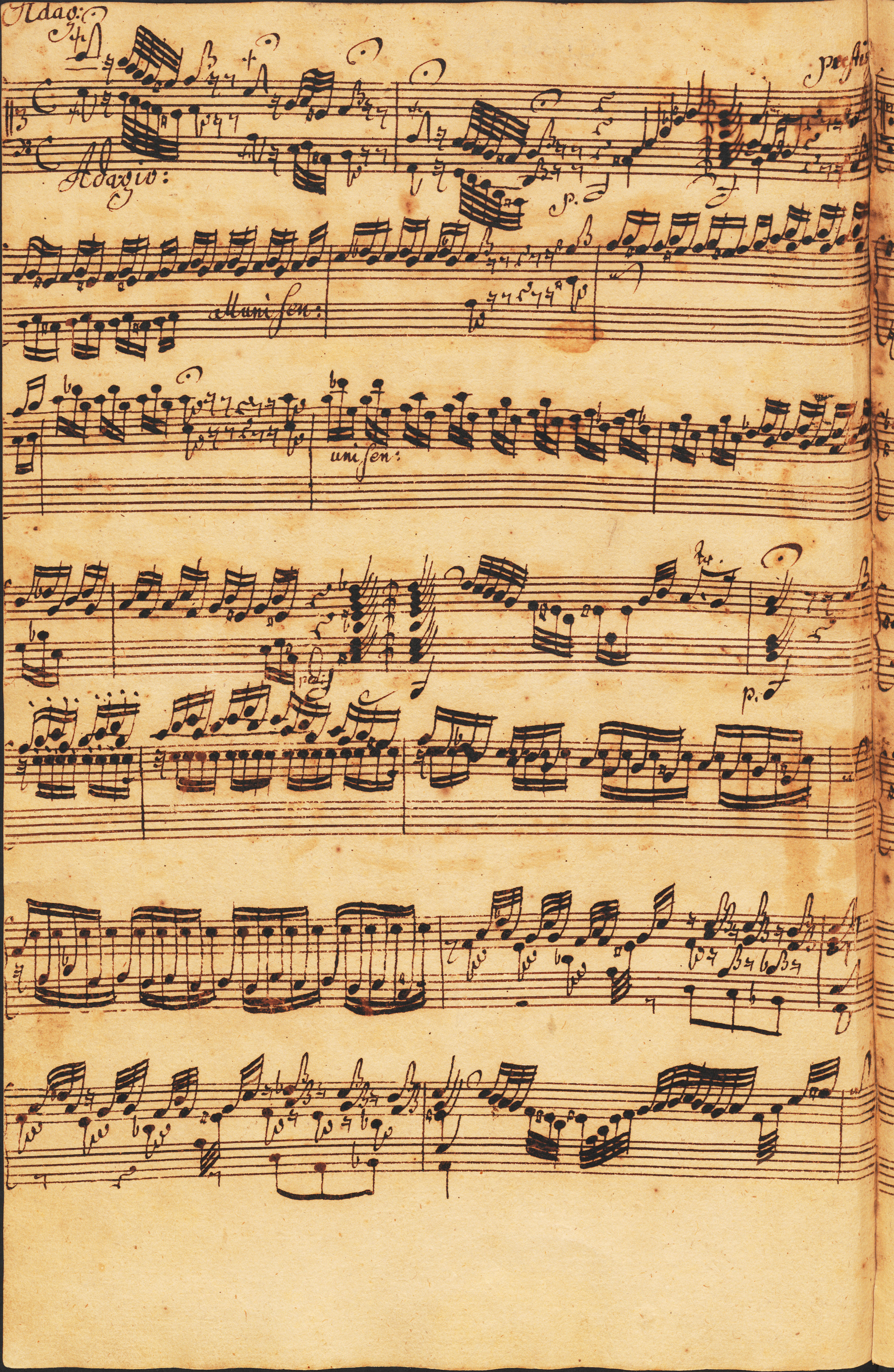
pg 1
Digital facsimiles of the Ringk manuscript have become widely available in the 21st century.
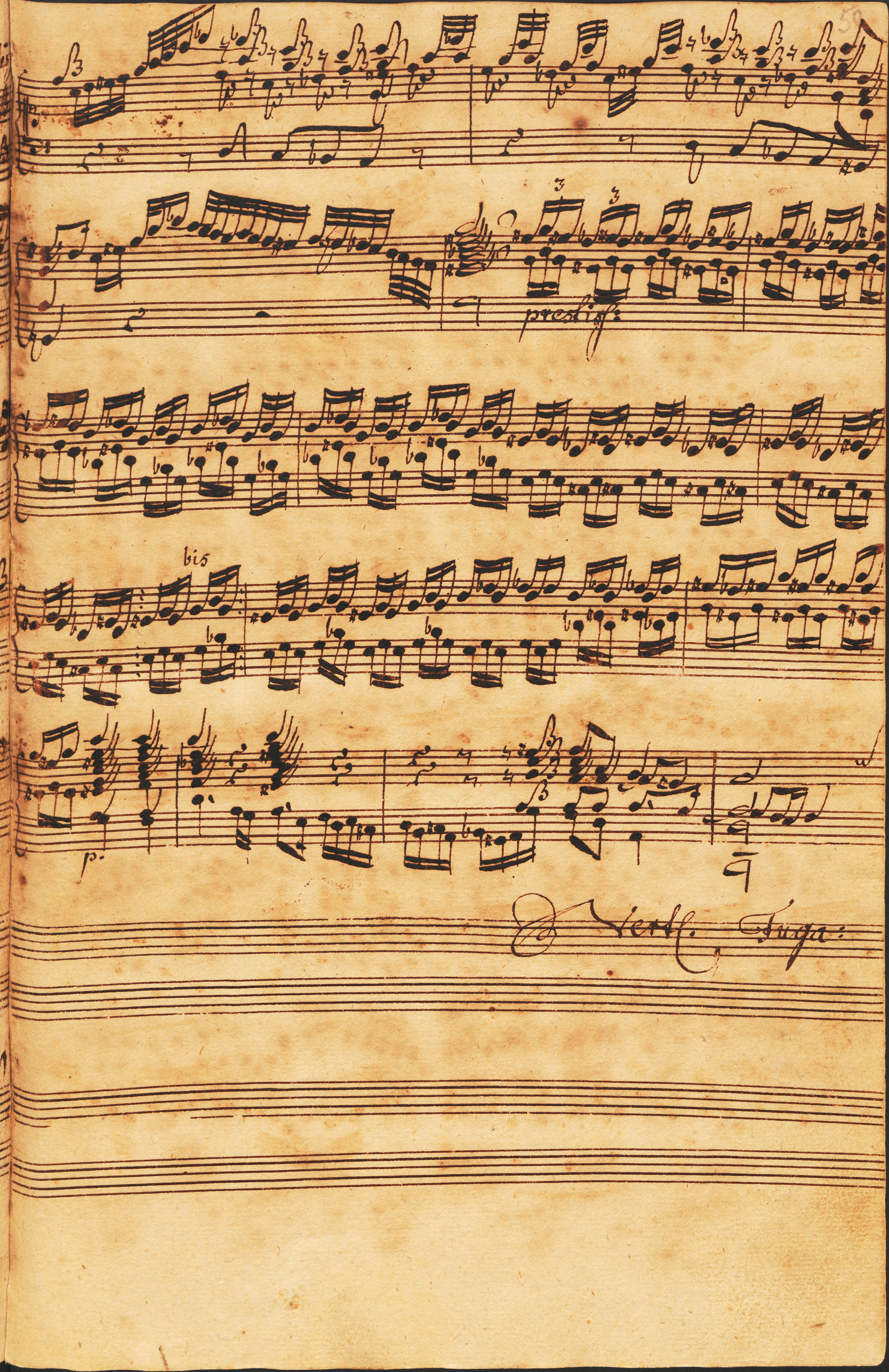
pg 2

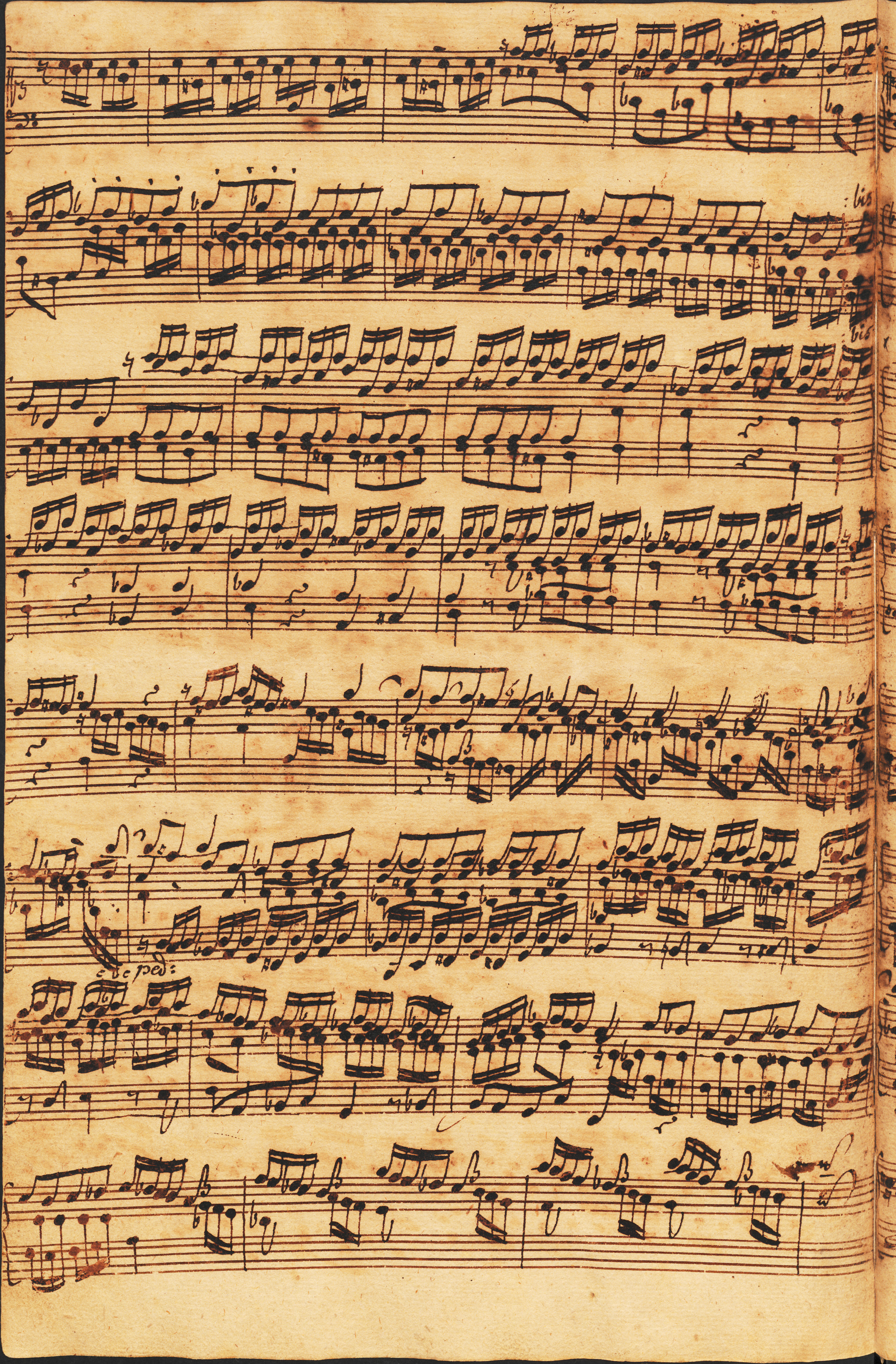
pg 3

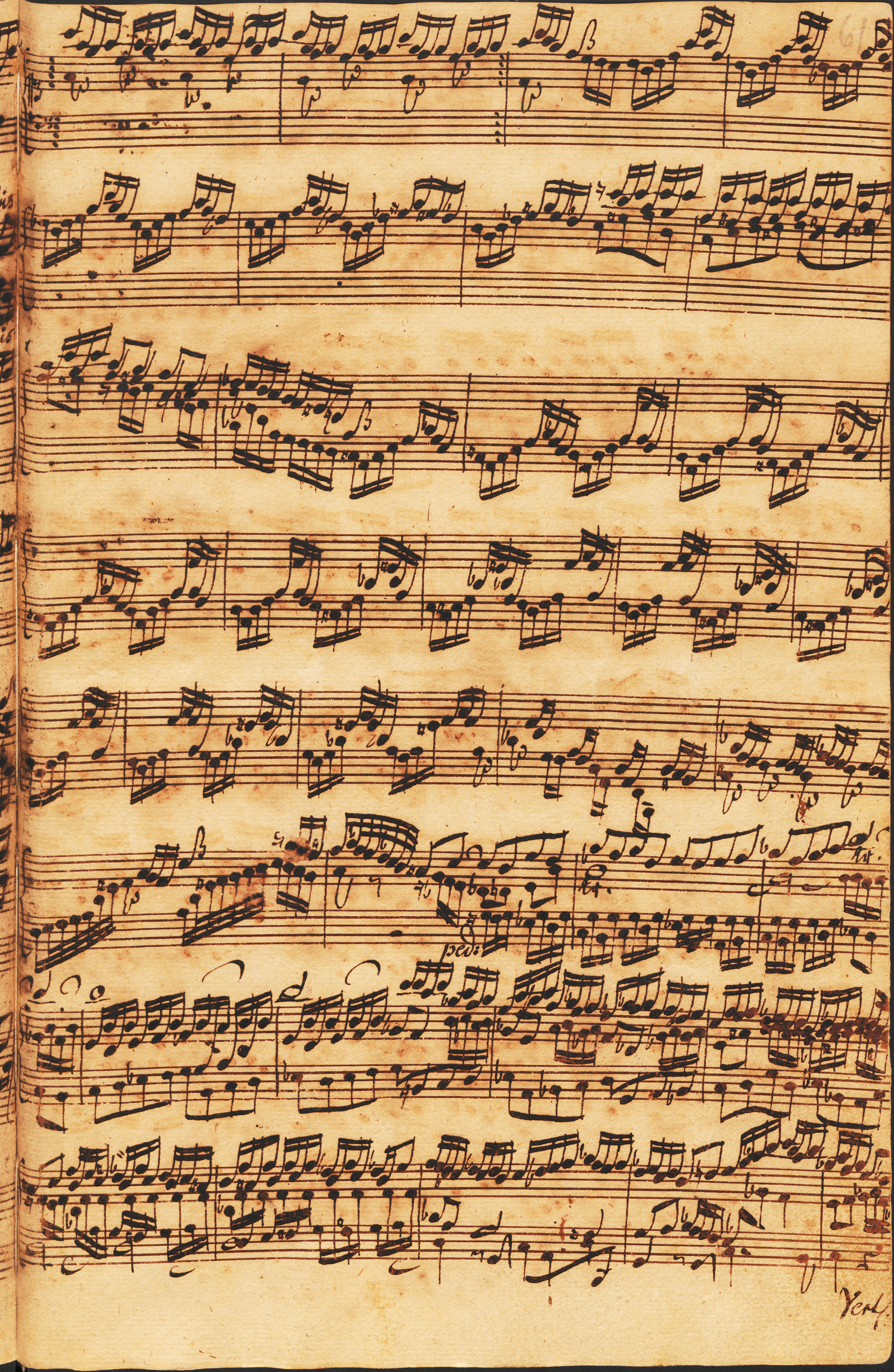
pg 4

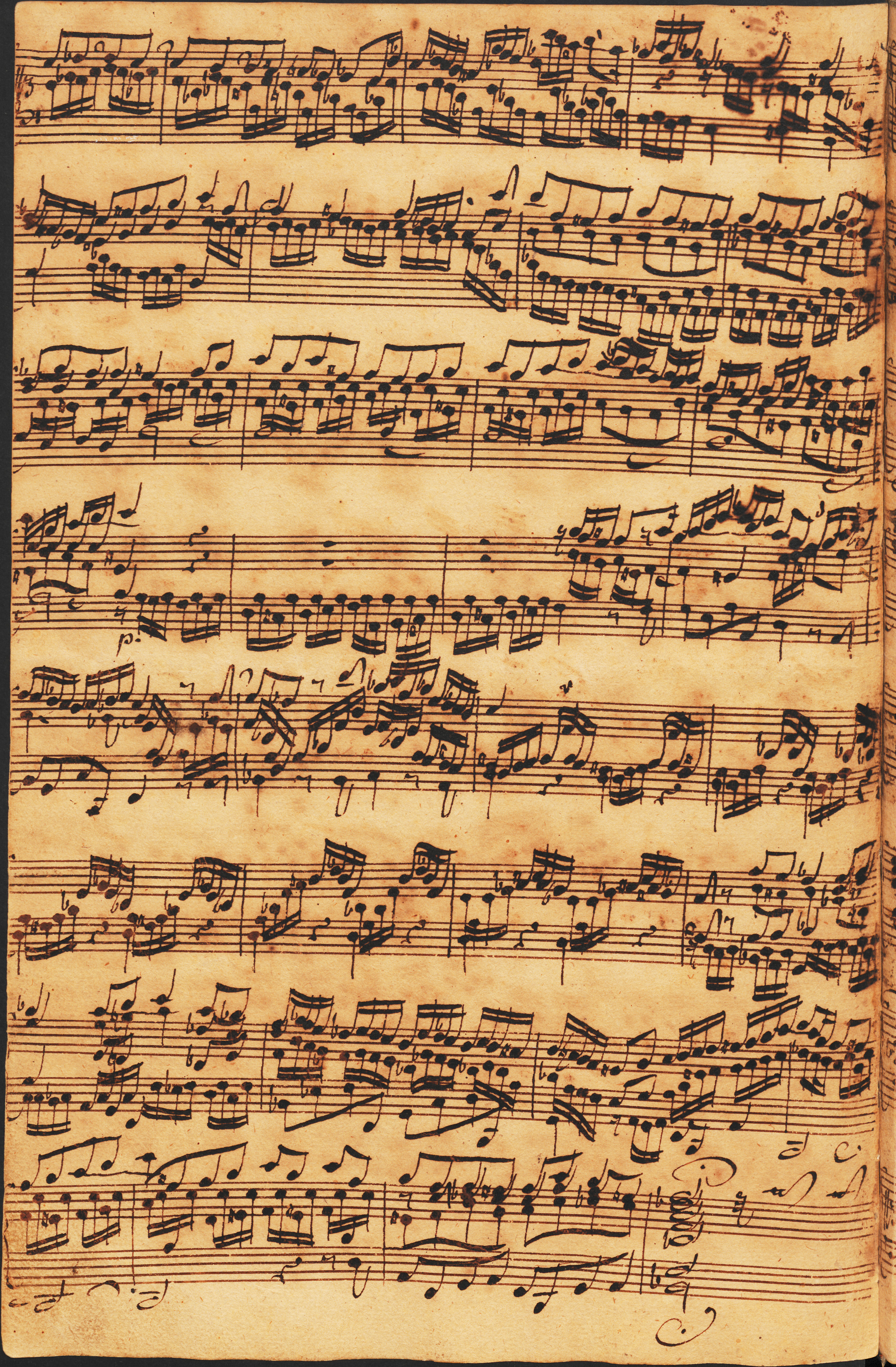
pg 5

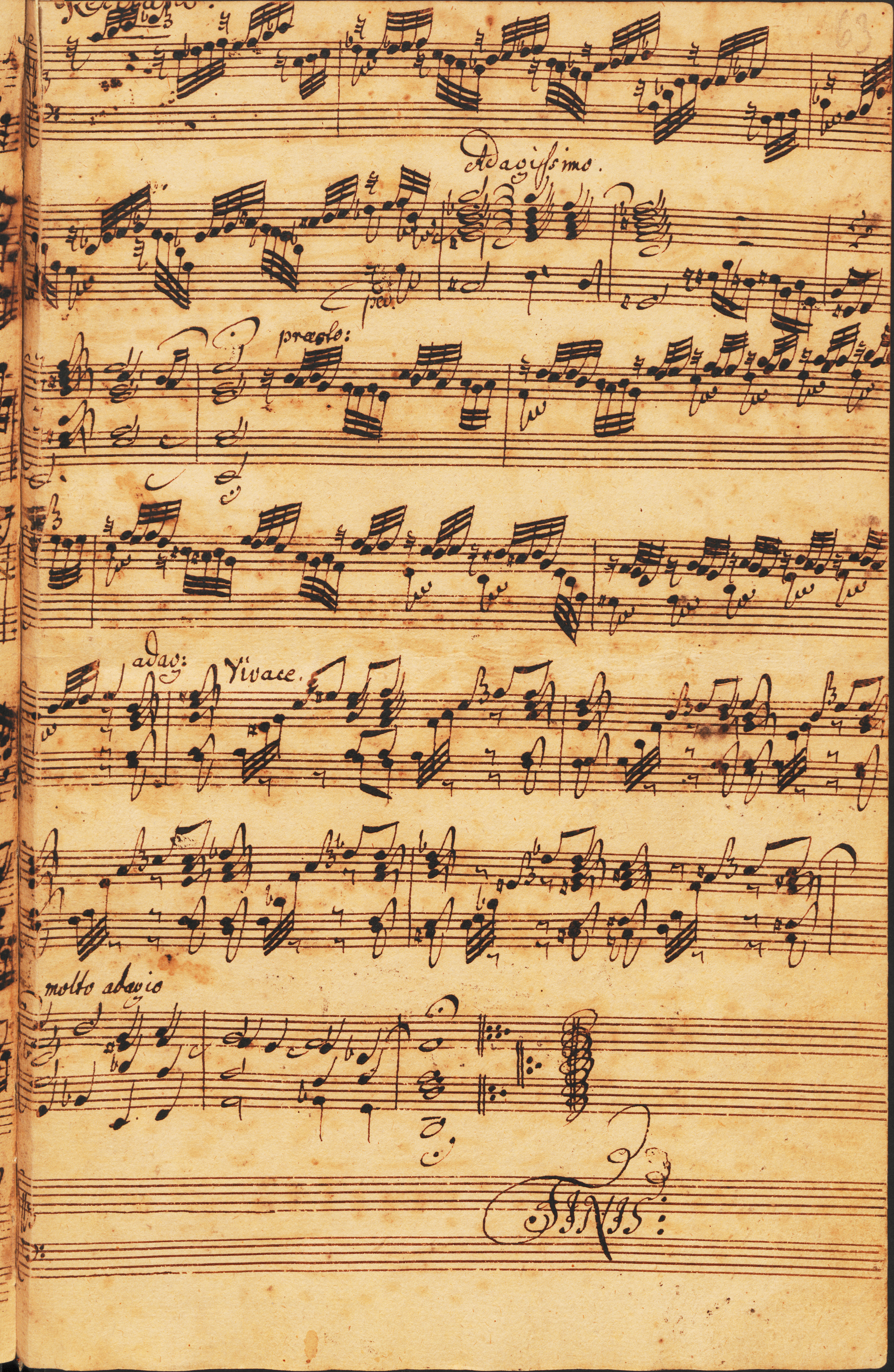
pg 6

Ringk's manuscript does not use a separate staff for the pedal part, which was common in the 18th century (notes to be played on the pedal were indicated by "p." being written at the start of the sequence). Printed editions of the BWV 565 organ score invariably write the pedal line on a separate staff. In Ringk's manuscript the upper staff is written down using the soprano clef (as was common in the time when the manuscript originated), where printed editions use the treble clef.

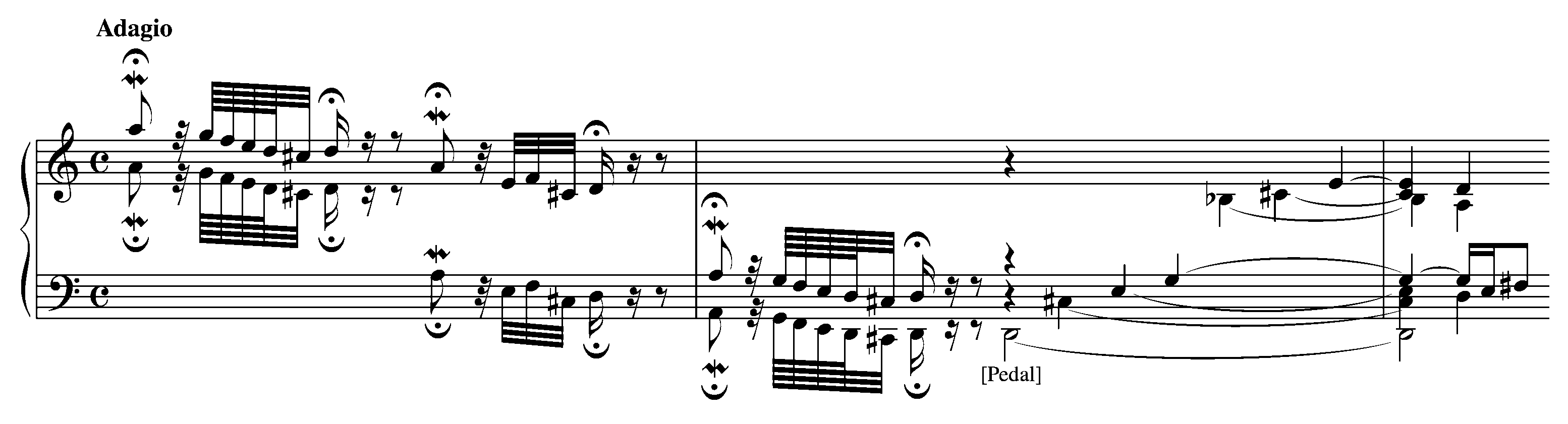
Beginning, Ringk's "Dorian" notation – layout like Ringk's manuscript apart from position of fermatas and the clef for the upper staff

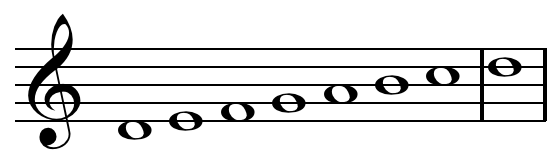
"D Dorian" mode notation used by Ringk for BWV 565

All other extant manuscript copies of the score date from at least several decades later: some of these, written in the 19th century, are related with each other in that they have similar solutions to the defects in the Ringk manuscript. Whether these derive from an earlier manuscript independent from Ringk's (possibly in the C. P. E. Bach/Johann Friedrich Agricola/Johann Kirnberger circle) is debated by scholars. These near-identical 19th-century copies, the version Felix Mendelssohn knew, use the treble clef and a separate staff for the pedal. In general, the later copies show a less extensive use of fermatas in the opening measures and have fewer measures that do not add up properly, but that may as well be from polishing a defective source as from deriving from a cleaner earlier source. In the later copies the work is named for instance "Adagio" and "Fuga" (for the respective parts of the work), or "Toccata" for the work as a whole.

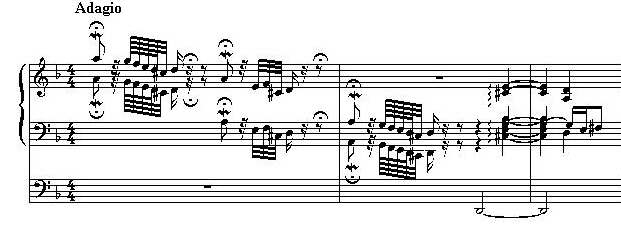
Beginning, D minor notation, with the pedal part on a separate staff (also, arpeggio in second half of second measure converted to modern notation)

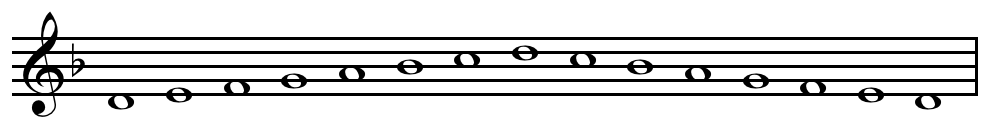
D minor: usual notation with a ♭ at the key

The name "Toccata" is most probably a later addition, similar to the title of Toccata, Adagio and Fugue, BWV 564, because in the Baroque era such organ pieces would most commonly be called simply Prelude (Praeludium, etc.) or Prelude and Fugue. Ringk's copy abounds in Italian tempo markings, fermatas (a characteristic feature of Ringk's copies) and staccato dots, all very unusual features for pre-1740 German music.

German organ schools are distinguished into north German (e.g. Dieterich Buxtehude) and south German (e.g. Johann Pachelbel). The composition has stylistic characteristics from both schools: the stylus phantasticus, and other north German characteristics are most apparent. However, the numerous recitative stretches are rarely found in the works of northern composers and may have been inspired by Johann Heinrich Buttstett, a pupil of Pachelbel, whose few surviving free works, particularly his Prelude and Capriccio in D minor, exhibit similar features. A passage in the fugue of BWV 565 is an exact copy of a phrase in one of Johann Pachelbel's D minor fantasias, and the first half of the subject is based on this Pachelbel passage as well. At the time it was however common practice to create fugues on other composers' themes.

== Structure ==
BWV 565 exhibits a typical simplified north German structure with a short, free opening (toccata), a longer fugal section (fugue), and a short free closing section which is not officially named by notation.

=== Toccata ===
The Toccata begins with a single-voice flourish in the upper ranges of the keyboard, doubled at the octave and ornamented with a lower mordent. It then spirals toward the bottom, where a diminished seventh chord appears (which actually implies a dominant chord with a minor 9th against a tonic pedal), built one note at a time. This resolves into a D major chord:

| Opening of the toccata played on the Flentrop organ at the Oberlin Conservatory of Music |

Three short passages follow, each reiterating a short motif and doubled at the octave. The section ends with a diminished seventh chord which resolved into the tonic, D minor, through a flourish. The second section of the Toccata is a number of loosely connected figurations and flourishes; the pedal switches to the dominant key, A minor. This section segues into the third and final section of the Toccata, which consists almost entirely of a passage doubled at the sixth and comprising reiterations of the same three-note figure, similar to doubled passages in the first section. After a brief pedal flourish, the piece ends with a D minor suspended chord which eventually resolves.

=== Fugue ===
The subject of the four-voice fugue is made up entirely of sixteenth notes, with an implied pedal point set against a brief melodic subject that first falls, then rises. Such violinistic figures are frequently encountered in Baroque music and that of Bach, both as fugue subjects and as material in non-imitative pieces. Unusually, the answer is in the subdominant key, rather than the traditional dominant. Although technically a four-part fugue, most of the time there are only three voices, and some of the interludes are in two, or even one voice (notated as two). Although only simple triadic harmony is employed throughout the fugue, there is an unexpected C minor subject entry, and furthermore, a solo pedal statement of the subject—a unique feature for a Baroque fugue. Immediately after the final subject entry, the fugue resolves to a sustained B♭ major chord.

=== Coda ===
A multi-sectional coda follows, marked Recitativo. Although only 17 bars long, it progresses through five tempo changes. The last bars are played Molto adagio, and the piece ends with a minor plagal cadence.

== Performance ==
The performance time of the piece is usually around nine minutes, but shorter performance times (e.g., 8:15 or 7:59) and execution times of over 10:30 exist. The first section of the piece, the Toccata, takes somewhat less than a third of the total performance time.

As was common practice for German music of the 17th century, the intended registration is not specified, and performers' choices vary from simple solutions such as organo pleno to exceedingly complex ones, like those described by Harvey Grace.

== Reception ==
In the first century of its existence the entire reception history of the Toccata and Fugue in D minor consists of being saved from oblivion by maybe not more than a single manuscript copy. Then it took about a century from its first publication as a little-known organ composition by Johann Sebastian Bach to becoming one of the signature pieces of the composer. The composition's third century took it from Bach's most often recorded organ piece to a composition with an unclear origin. Despite Mendelssohn's opinion that it was "at the same time learned and something for the people", followed by a fairly successful piano transcription in the second half of the 19th century, it was not until the 20th century that it rose above the average notability of an organ piece by Bach. The work's appearance (in an orchestral transcription by Leopold Stokowski) in the 1940 Walt Disney film Fantasia contributed to its popularity, around which time scholars started to seriously doubt its attribution to Bach.

The composition has been deemed both "particularly suited to the organ" and "strikingly unorganistic". It has been seen as united by a single ground-thought, but also as containing "passages which have no connection whatever with the chief idea". It has been called "entirely a thing of virtuosity" yet also described as being "not so difficult as it sounds". It has been described as some sort of program music depicting a storm, and, contrarily, as abstract music. It has been presented as an emanation of the galant style, yet too dramatic to be anything near that style. Its period of origin has been assumed to have been as early as around 1704, and as late as the 1750s. Its defining characteristics have been associated with extant compositions by Bach (BWV 531, 549a, 578, 911, 914, 922 and several of the solo violin sonatas and partitas), and by others (including Nicolaus Bruhns and Johann Heinrich Buttstett), as well as with untraceable earlier versions for other instruments and/or by other composers. It has been deemed too simplistic for it to have been written down by Bach, and too much a stroke of genius to have been composed by anyone but Bach.

What remains is "the most famous organ work in existence", that in its rise to fame was helped by various arrangements, including bombastic piano settings, versions for full symphonic orchestra, and alternative settings for more modest solo instruments.

=== Score editions ===
In 1833, BWV 565 was published for the first time, in the third of three bundles of "little-known" organ compositions by Bach. The edition was conceived and partly prepared by Felix Mendelssohn, who already had BWV 565 in his repertoire by 1830. In 1846, C. F. Peters published the Toccata con Fuga as No. 4 in their fourth volume of organ compositions by Bach. In 1867, the Bach Gesellschaft included it in Band 15 of its complete edition of Bach's works. Novello published the work in 1886 as No. 1 in their sixth volume of Bach's organ works.

In the early 1910s, Albert Schweitzer collaborated with Charles-Marie Widor to compile a complete edition of Bach's organ compositions, published by Schirmer. In 1912, BWV 565 was published in the second volume, containing works of Bach's "first master period". Around the start of the First World War, Augener republished William Thomas Best's late 19th-century edition of the work in volume 2 of their complete edition of Bach's organ works.

After 1950, when the Bach-Werke-Verzeichnis was published, it was no longer needed to indicate the Toccata and Fugue in D minor as "Peters Vol. IV, No. 4", as "BGA Volume XV p. 267", as "Novello VI, 1", or without "Dorian", to distinguish it from the Toccata and Fugue with the same key signature. From then on the work has been simply BWV 565, and the other, the so-called "Dorian", has been BWV 538. In 1964, the New Bach Edition included BWV 565 in Series IV, Volume 6, with its critical commentary published in Volume 5 in 1979. Dietrich Kilian, the editor of these volumes, explains in the introduction to Vol. 6 that the New Bach Edition prefers to stay close to authoritative early sources for their score presentations. For BWV 565 that means staying close to the Ringk manuscript. Consequently, the name of the piece was again given in Italian as Toccata con Fuga, and the piece was again written down in D Dorian (i.e. without ♭ at the key). However, more modern conventions were maintained with regard to using the treble clef in the upper staff and using a separate staff for the pedal.

A facsimile of Ringk's manuscript was published in 2000. In the 21st century, the facsimile became available online, as well as various downloadable files of previously printed editions. In 2010, Breitkopf & Härtel initiated a new edition of Bach's organ works, with BWV 565 appearing in its fourth volume.

=== Performances and recordings ===
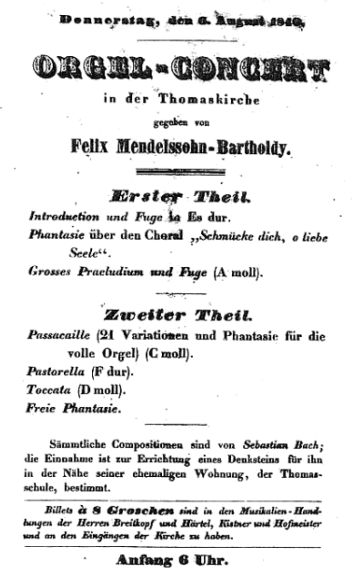
Program of Mendelssohn's 1840 organ concert: BWV 565 is listed as last piece by Bach, before the "Freie Phantasie" which was an improvisation by Mendelssohn.

The first major public performance was by Mendelssohn, on 6 August 1840, in Leipzig. The concert was very well received by the critics, among them Robert Schumann, who admired the work's famous opening as an example of Bach's sense of humor. Franz Liszt adopted the piece into his organ repertoire. He used the glockenspiel stop for the Prestissimo triplets in the opening section, and the quintadena stop for the repeated notes in bars 12–15.

The work was first recorded (in abridged form as "Toccata and Finale") by John J. McClellan on the Salt Lake Tabernacle organ in Salt Lake City in late August or early September 1910 by the Columbia Graphophone Company, who released it in the US in 1911 on Columbia 10-inch disc A945 and in the UK on Columbia-Rena disc 1704, which is one of the first commercial pipe organ recordings. In 1926, the organ version of BWV 565 was recorded on 78 rpm discs. In a 1928 concert program, Schweitzer indicated BWV 565 as one of Bach's "best-known" compositions, considering it to be a youth work. Schweitzer's first recording of the piece was issued in 1935. In 1951, he recorded the work again.

In the 1950s, a recording of Helmut Walcha playing BWV 565 on organ was released. In that, and subsequent releases of Walcha's recordings of BWV 565 on Deutsche Grammophon (DG), there is an obvious evolution of the work from "one among many" organ compositions by Bach to a definite signature piece by the composer. In early Archiv Produktion releases, the list on the sleeve contained the organ compositions in the order they appeared on the recording without distinction; in the 1960s, BWV 565 began to be listed first; by the 1980s, the font size for BWV 565 was larger than that of the other compositions; and in the 1990s, Walcha's 1963 recording of the piece became the only piece by Bach included in DG's Classic Mania CD set with popular tunes by various classical composers. Similarly, the album sleeves of Marie-Claire Alain's recordings of BWV 565 in the 1960s listed the piece in the same font as the other recorded works, but by the 1980s it was in a larger font. US record companies seemed faster in putting BWV 565 forward as Bach's best-known organ piece. In 1955, E. Power Biggs recorded the Toccata 14 times, played on different European organs, and Columbia issued those recordings on a single album.

Hans-Joachim Schulze describes the force of the piece on a record sleeve:

Here is elemental and unbounded power, in impatiently ascending and descending runs and rolling masses of chords, that only with difficulty abates sufficiently to give place to the logic and balance of the fugue. With the reprise of the initial Toccata, the dramatic idea reaches its culmination amidst flying scales and with an ending of great sonority.

Organists recording BWV 565 more than once include Jean Guillou, Lionel Rogg and Wolfgang Rübsam. Some musicians, such as Karl Richter, who did not record organ performances very often, included BWV 565 in their anthologies. By the end of the century, hundreds of organists had recorded BWV 565. In the 21st century, several recordings of BWV 565 became available online, such as a recording included in James Kibbie's Bach Organ Works project and John Scott Whiteley's broadcast for BBC TV made in 2001.

=== Piano arrangements ===
Edison Bell Velvet Face (VF) recording No. 676 (part 1): Marie Novello's performance of Tausig's arrangement of BWV 565. The VF series with a bright green label ran from 1925 to 1927.

Bach's Toccata and Fugue was not performed on the organ exclusively. The title page of the first publication of the piece already indicated that performance on the piano by one or two players was possible. From 1868 to 1881, Karl Tausig's piano transcription of the Toccata and Fugue in D minor was performed four times in the Gewandhaus in Leipzig. Many more piano transcriptions of BWV 565 were published, for instance by Louis Brassin, Ferruccio Busoni, Alfred Cortot, and by Max Reger in transcriptions for both piano two hands and four hands.

Tausig's version of the work was recorded on piano rolls several times in the first decades of the 20th century. In the mid-1920s, Marie Novello recorded the Tausig piano version of BWV 565 on 78 rpm discs. Percy Grainger's 1931 recording on the piano, based on the Tausig and Busoni transcriptions, was written out as a score by Leslie Howard, and then recorded by other artists. Ignaz Friedman recorded the piano version he had published in 1944. From the 1950s to the first decades of the 21st century, there were half a dozen recordings of Tausig's piano version, and several dozen of Busoni's.

=== In Bach's biographies ===
In Johann Nikolaus Forkel's early 19th-century biography of Bach, the work is left unmentioned. Forkel probably did not even know of the composition. In C. L. Hilgenfeldt's biography it is merely listed among the published works. Hilgenfeldt considers the Toccata and Fugue in F major the most accomplished of Bach's toccatas for organ. In Karl Hermann Bitter's 1865 Bach biography, BWV 565 is only listed in an appendix.

In 1873, Philipp Spitta devoted somewhat less than a page to the work in the first volume of his Bach biography. He assumed the work was written in the first year of Bach's second Weimar period (1708–1717). He saw more north German characteristics (Buxtehude's restless style) in the form of the Toccata, rather than south German (Pachelbel's simple and quiet approach). Spitta considered the fugue "particularly suited to the organ, and more especially effective in the pedal part." His description of the piece refers to long sections that are surfeit: "rocking passages which have no connection whatever with the chief idea" and organ recitatives alternating with "ponderous, roaring masses of chords". Spitta likened some phrases of the Toccata and Fugue to another early work, the Fugue in G minor, BWV 578.

Spitta also detects a rhythmic figure that appears briefly in the concluding part of the work (bar 137) which, extensively elaborated, reappears in the keyboard Prelude in A minor, BWV 922, a work he supposes to have been composed around 1710. In Reginald Lane Poole's 1882 biography, the work is again merely listed. In the 1905 first version of his Bach biography, Albert Schweitzer leaves BWV 565 unmentioned in the chapter on the organ works. In André Pirro's 1906 biography, Bach's organ toccatas are only mentioned as a group. He considers none of them written before Bach's later Weimar years (so closer to 1717 than to 1708).

Up to this point, none of the biographers seem to have given any special attention to BWV 565. If mentioned, it is listed or described along with other organ compositions, but is far from being considered the best or the most famous of Bach's organ compositions, or even of his toccatas. However, that was about to change. In 1908, Schweitzer reworked his biography for its first German edition. In that edition he indicates the work as "well known". After listing several organ works in which Bach showed himself a pupil of Buxtehude, Frescobaldi, and various contemporary Italian composers, Schweitzer describes the Toccata and Fugue in D minor as a work in which the composer rises to independent mastery:

In the D minor toccata and fugue, the strong and ardent spirit has finally realised the laws of form. A single dramatic ground-thought unites the daring passage work of the toccata, that seems to pile up like wave on wave; and in the fugue the intercalated passages in broken chords only serve to make the climax all the more powerful.

In Hubert Parry's 1909 Bach biography, the work is qualified as "well known" and "one of the most effective of [Bach's] works in every way". He calls the Toccata "brilliantly rhapsodical", more or less follows Spitta in the description of the fugue, and is most impressed by the coda: "It would be hard to find a concluding passage more imposing or more absolutely adapted to the requirements of the instrument than this coda." Apart from seeing Buxtehude's influence, he likens the theme of the fugue to the theme of the fugue of Prelude and Fugue in B minor, BWV 544, which he considers a late work.

In the 1979 first volume of his Bach biography, Alberto Basso calls BWV 565 "famosissimo" (most famous) and "celebratissima" (most celebrated), maintaining that the popularity of these works hinges entirely on this composition. He sees it as a youth work, composed before 1708, that with its underdeveloped fugue is stylistically eclectic but unified without breaking continuity. He links it to the northern school, and mentions Tausig, Busoni and Stokowki as influencing its popularity. Basso warns against reading too much into what he considers an accessible composition.

In his 1999 Bach biography, Klaus Eidam devotes a few pages to the Toccata and Fugue. He considers it an early work, probably composed for testing the technical qualities of a new organ. He feels that the crescendo that develops through arpeggios, gradually building up to the use of hundreds of pipes at the same time, can show exactly at what point the wind system of the organ might become inadequate. In his view, some of the more unusual characteristics of the piece can be explained as resulting from Bach's capacity as an organ tester.

Christoph Wolff, in his 2000 Bach biography, sees BWV 565 as an early work. In his view, it is "as refreshingly imaginative, varied, and ebullient as it is structurally undisciplined and unmastered".

=== In books on Bach's organ works ===
Before his 1906 Bach biography, André Pirro had already written a book on Bach's organ works. In that book he devoted less than a page to BWV 565, and considers it some kind of program music depicting a tempest, including flashes of lightning and rumbling thunder. Pirro supposes Bach had success with this music in the smaller German courts he visited. All in all, he judges the music as superficial, not more than a stepping stone in Bach's development.

In the early 1920s, Harvey Grace published a series of articles on Bach's organ works. He considers that the notes of the piece are not too difficult to play, but that an organist performing the work is primarily challenged by interpretation. He gives tips on how to perform the work so that it does not sound like a "meaningless scramble". He describes the fugue as slender and simple, but only a "very sketchy example of the form". In his description of the piece, Grace refers to Pirro, elaborating Pirro's "storm" analogy, and like Pirro, he seems convinced Bach went touring with the piece. His suggestions for the organ registration make comparisons with how the piece would be played by an orchestra.

In 1948, Hermann Keller wrote that the Toccata and Fugue was uncharacteristic for Bach, but nonetheless bore some of his distinguishing marks. His description of the piece echoes earlier storm analogies. Keller sees the opening bars' unison passages as "descending like a lightning flash, the long roll of thunder of the broken chords of the full organ, and the stormy undulation of the triplets".

In 1980, Peter Williams wrote about BWV 565 in the first volume of his The Organ Music of J.S.Bach. The author warns against numerological over-interpretation like that of Volker Gwinner. Many parts of the composition are described as typical of Bach. Williams sees stylistic matches with Pachelbel, with the north German organ school, and with the Italian violin school, but sees various unusual features of the composition as well. Williams questions the authenticity of the piece, based on its various unusual features, and elaborates the idea that the piece may have a violin version ancestor. The reworked edition of this book, in one volume, appeared in 2003, and devotes more pages to discussing the authenticity and possible prior versions of BWV 565. In the meantime, Williams had written a 1981 article on the authenticity of BWV 565; this was followed by numerous publications by other scholars on the same topic.

J. S. Bach as Organist, a 1986 collection of essays edited by George Stauffer and Ernest May, discussed the registration Bach would have used for BWV 565.

=== Arrangements for symphony orchestra ===
Part 1

Part 2
Stokowski's orchestration performed by himself and the Philadelphia Orchestra, reissued on two sides of a 78 rpm disc in the late 1920s

Around the same time as Grace made comparisons with an orchestral version in his performance suggestions, Edward Elgar was producing orchestrations of two organ pieces by Bach, which did not include BWV 565. Elgar did not particularly like the work, nor Schweitzer's glowing comments about it.

In 1927, Leopold Stokowski recorded his orchestration of BWV 565 with the Philadelphia Orchestra. Soon the idea was emulated by other musicians. An orchestration was performed in Carnegie Hall in 1928, Henry Wood (pseudonymously, as "Paul Klenovsky") arranged his orchestration before the end of the decade. By the mid-1930s, Leonidas Leonardi had published his orchestration, and Alois Melichar's orchestration was recorded in 1939.

In 1947, Eugene Ormandy recorded his orchestration of the piece with the Philadelphia Orchestra. The score of Stokowski's arrangement was published in 1952. Other orchestrations of the piece were provided by Fabien Sevitzky, René Leibowitz (1958), Lucien Cailliet (1967), Stanisław Skrowaczewski (1968) and Andrew Davis (2023–2024).

=== In film ===
BWV 565 was used as film music well before the sound film era, becoming a cliché to illustrate horror and villainy. Its first uses in sound film included the 1931 film Dr. Jekyll and Mr. Hyde and the 1934 film The Black Cat.

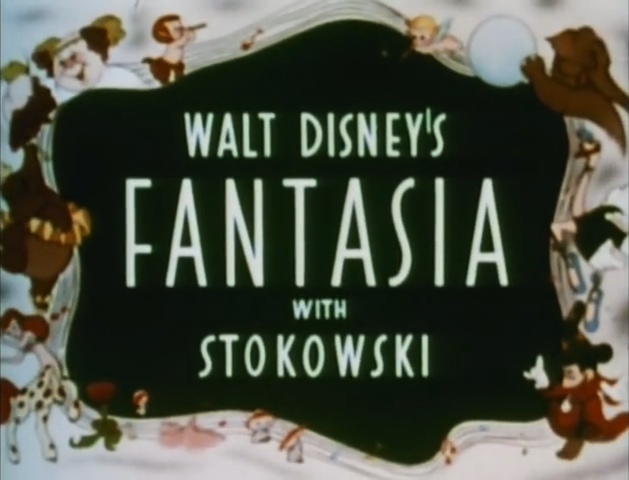
Trailer for Fantasia

External audio
- Bach's Toccata and Fugue in D minor, BWV 565, as arranged and performed by Leopold Stokowski and the Philadelphia Orchestra for the soundtrack of Fantasia, as released in 1940, at Internet Archive

After 1936, another approach to using BWV 565 in film was under consideration. Oskar Fischinger had previously used Bach's Third Brandenburg Concerto to accompany abstract animations and suggested to Stokowski that his orchestral version of BWV 565 could be used in the same way. Later in 1937, while in California, Stokowski and Disney discussed the idea of making a short animated film of The Sorcerer's Apprentice by Dukas for Disney Studios, the intention being to introduce classical music to a younger and broader audience. Similar in spirit to the popular series of Silly Symphonies, the short film proved costly to produce. However, starting with the Toccata and Fugue and the Sorcerer's Apprentice, Stokowski, Disney and the music critic Deems Taylor chose other compositions to incorporate into their film project, known as "The Concert Feature". By the time Disney's Fantasia was released in 1940, the animations accompanying BWV 565 had been made semi-abstract, although Fischinger's original idea that the performance of the music start with showing Stokowski directing his orchestra was preserved. Taylor begins his narrative with, "What you’re going to see is the designs and pictures and stories of what music inspired in the minds and imaginations of a group of artists." The opening number, the "Toccata and Fugue," will be absolute music—music that exists for its own sake—and will try to depict what might go on in the mind of the person listening to it. "At first you are more or less conscious of the orchestra," Taylor explains, "so our picture opens with a series of impressions of the conductor and the players. Then the music begins to suggest other things to your imagination—oh, just masses of color, or cloud forms, or vague shadows, or geometrical objects floating in space." In the 1942 cinema release of the film by RKO, the Toccata and Fugue was cut entirely, only to return in a 1946 re-release. Fantasia contributed significantly to the popularity of the Toccata and Fugue.

The 1950 film Sunset Boulevard used BWV 565 as a joking reference to the horror genre. The piece has appeared in many other films, including 20,000 Leagues Under the Sea (1954), in which it is played by Captain Nemo on the organ of the Nautilus, before the submarine's pitiless and apparently unmotivated attack on a ship. BWV 565 also appeared in Fellini's 1960 La Dolce Vita. The 1962 film adaptation of The Phantom of the Opera used BWV 565 in the suspense and horror sense. The tune is also played 1964 comedy-fantasy film 7 Faces of Dr. Lao. It is used "without irony and in an apocalyptic spirit updated from its earlier Gothic implications" at the beginning and end of the 1975 dystopian science fiction film Rollerball. Shortened to two minutes in length, BWV 565 was used as the introductory theme for the French animation Once Upon a Time... Man, in 26 episodes between 1978 and 1981. It is also sampled in the 1965 comedy film, The Great Race, played in the opening credits of the 1972 horror film Tales from the Crypt and a version performed by Simon Preston played in the opening and the final scenes of the 1975 dystopian sports film Rollerball.

Ennio Morricone took inspiration from the score BWV 565/1 for the 1965 film For a Few Dollars More of Sergio Leone. Morricone used the trumpet musical theme "La resa dei conti" ("Sixty Seconds to What?") for the opening baroque mordent of J. S. Bach's Toccata. The cowboy shootout with Gian Maria Volonté takes place in a deconsecrated church, turned into a pigsty, where the theme is heard on the organ at full blast. According to Miceli (2016), "It is [...] hard to establish what led the composer to quote Bach—perhaps the shared key of D minor led to the idea of the organ, whereas the small church might have at most accommodated nothing more than a run-down harmonium. In any case, for a classically trained musician such a glaring reference to one of the most hackneyed commonplaces of Western art music—certainly the most hackneyed within Bach's output (although its authorship has long been disputed)—clashes with the alleged intention of paying homage to the Eisenach maestro." In his autobiographical book written with De Rosa (2019), Morricone wrote that, "The death ritual carried out in a church convinced me to use the Bach quotation and the organ. Volonté's gestures in that sequence reminded me of some paintings of Rembrandt and Vermeer that Leone was fond of. Those artists lived in an epoch close to Bach, and with my music I decided to look at that kind of past."

=== Authenticity research and reconstructions ===
A certain uneasiness regarding the authorship of BWV 565 had been around long before the 1980s. From Hilgenfeldt in 1850, to Elgar in the 1920s, to Basso in the late 1970s, the extraordinary popularity of the piece seems to have taken scholars and musicians by surprise. Mendelssohn felt it was something for both the erudite and the masses. Some scholars who analysed the composition's counterpoint felt it was substandard. They said it was stylistically too close to the galant style of the later 18th century to be an early 18th-century composition. Its presumed time of composition shifted around. Some felt the composition was too modern to have been composed by a young Bach, or too simplistic to have been composed by a middle-aged Bach. Although many commentators have invoked Bach's genius to explain the dislocated modernity in an immature composition, an increasing number of scholars felt unsatisfied with such an intangible explanation.

In a 1981 article, Peter Williams reiterated the speculations, from which he saw a way out of the conundrum, already featured in his 1980 book on Bach's organ compositions:

- The piece was originally composed for violin, not necessarily by Bach (that would explain its "simplicity");
- It was later transcribed for the organ, not necessarily by Bach (that would explain its "modernity").

The analysis of the material sources for the piece, its oldest surviving manuscripts, although insufficiently pursued according to some scholars, was seen as too limited to give a conclusive answer to these questions. What was available from that branch of the research could be explained in opposite ways. Likewise, whether the more elaborate stylistic evidence was considered conclusive or merely circumstantial, depended on who was trying to prove what.

In 1982, David Humphreys suggested that BWV 565 may have been composed and/or arranged by Kellner, or by someone from the circle around Kellner. Despite many stylistic similarities, however, Kellner was ruled out a quarter of a century later: "in comparison with the style of Kellner, BWV 565 more resembles the style of J. S. Bach"; "many of Kellner's keyboard pieces revealed that his style boasts pronounced galant elements ... this clearly stands in strong contrast to the dramatic style of the Toccata BWV 565".

A violin composition by Bach's eldest son Wilhelm Friedemann, transcribed for the organ by Ringk, was named as another possible source. However, according to 21st-century statistical analysis, Wilhelm Friedemann was even less likely to have been the composer of the Fugue than Kellner. The same research indicated that large portions of the Fugue were consistent with the style of Johann Ludwig Krebs, but with more than half of the Fugue more likely composed by J. S. Bach. After initially confirming Williams's doubts about the authorship of BWV 565, by the second decade of the 21st century, statistical analysis left the attribution issue undecided. No-one had found a composer more compatible with the style of its fugue than Bach himself. In the words of Jean-Claude Zehnder, who was sympathetic towards the violin version reconstruction: "The matter still remains open, despite the scholarly discourse that began in 1981. Until proof of the contrary, BWV 565 should be considered as a work by Johann Sebastian Bach." No edition of the Bach Werke Verzeichnis has listed BWV 565 among the works seen as spurious or doubtful, nor does the work's entry on the website of the Bach Archiv Leipzig mention any doubts.

==== Attribution question ====
In 1961, Antony Davies remarked that the Toccata was void of counterpoint. Half a decade later, BWV 565 was further questioned. Walter Emery advocated that scepticism was a necessary condition to approaching the history of Bach's organ compositions, and Friedrich Blume saw problems with the traditional historiography of Bach's youth. Roger Bullivant thought the fugue too simple for Bach and saw characteristics that were incompatible with his style:

- Conclusion of the piece on a minor plagal cadence
- A pedal statement of the subject, unaccompanied by other voices
- Trill in bars 86 to 90

These doubts about the authorship of BWV 565 were elaborated by Peter Williams in a 1981 article. Hypotheses proposed by Williams in that article included that BWV 565 may have been composed after 1750 and may have been based on an earlier composition for another instrument, supposedly violin. Williams added more stylistic problems to the ones already mentioned by Bullivant, among others the parallel octaves throughout the opening of the toccata, the true subdominant answers in the fugue, and the primitive harmonies throughout the piece, with countersubjects in the fugue frequently moving through thirds and sixths only. All of these characteristics are either unique or extremely rare in organ music of the first half of the 18th century.

In 1995, Rolf Dietrich Claus decided against the authenticity of BWV 565, mainly based on the stylistic characteristics of the piece. He named another problem—in its first measure the composition contains a C♯, a note organs in Bach's time rarely had, and which Bach almost never used in his organ compositions. In his book on BWV 565, which he expanded in 1998 to counter some of the criticisms it received, Claus also dismisses the prior-version options suggested by Williams, noting that the toccata was an unknown genre for violin solo compositions of the time. Several essays in John Butt's Cambridge Companion on Bach discuss the attribution problems of BWV 565. Other biographers and scholars have left these attribution and prior-version theories unmentioned, or explained the atypical characteristics of the composition by indicating it was a very early composition by Bach, probably written during his stay in Arnstadt (1703–1706).

At the end of the 20th century, Hans Fagius wrote:

... the fact remains that the Toccata is strikingly unorganistic and modern to have been written by Bach around 1705, even if the form is that of North German toccata. There are, however, few organ pieces with so much spirit and drive, and why should not a genius like Bach, in youthful high spirits, have produced this unique work, which is in some respects half a century before its time and which could achieve a place as one of the most beloved compositions in all of music history?

The authorship debate has continued in the 21st century. Wolff calls it a pseudo-problem. Williams suggested that the piece may have been created by another composer who must have been born in the beginning of the 18th century, since details of style (such as triadic harmony, spread chords, and the use of solo pedal) may indicate post-1730, or even post-1750 idioms. Statistical analysis conducted by Peter van Kranenburg in 2006 confirmed the fugue was atypical for Bach, but failed to find a composer more likely to have composed it than Bach. David Schulenberg feels that the attribution of BWV 565 to Bach is doubtful. Richard Douglas Jones takes no position with regard to the composition's authenticity. In 2009, Reinmar Emans wrote that Claus and Wolff had diametrically opposed views on the reliability of Ringk as a copyist, inspired by their respective positions in the authenticity debate, and thinks that sort of speculation unhelpful.

==== Anterior version hypothesis and reconstructions ====
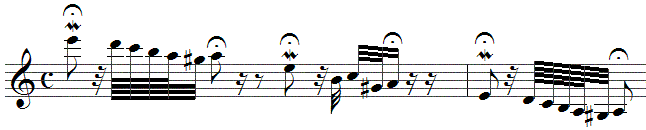
Transposed to A minor and adapted for the violin, the opening offers an opportunity to drop down through all four strings of the instrument.

Quadruple stops, not uncommon for 18th-century solo violin music, could have been used in passages such as this, taken from the ending.

The other hypothesis elaborated by Williams is that BWV 565 may have been a transcription of a lost solo violin piece. Parallel octaves and the preponderance of thirds and sixths may be explained by a transcriber's attempt to fill in harmony which, if preserved as is, would be inadequately thin on a pipe organ. This is corroborated by the fact that the subject of the fugue, and certain passages (such as bars 12–15), are evidently inspired by string music. Bach is known to have transcribed solo violin works for organ at least twice: the first movement of the Partita in E major for solo violin, BWV 1006, was converted by Bach into the solo organ part of the opening movement of the cantata Wir danken dir, Gott, wir danken dir, BWV 29. Bach also transcribed the Fugue movement of Sonata in G minor for solo violin, BWV 1001, as the second half of Prelude and Fugue in D minor for organ, BWV 539.

This notion inspired a new theory of adaptation: the reconstruction. Reconstructions have been applied to several other works by Bach, with variable success. A reconstruction for violin has been played by Jaap Schröder and Simon Standage. The violinist Andrew Manze produced his own reconstruction, also in A minor, which he has performed and recorded. In 2000, Mark Argent proposed a scordatura five-stringed cello instead. Williams proposed a violoncello piccolo or a five-stringed cello as alternative possibilities in 2003. A new violin version was created by scholar Bruce Fox-Lefriche in 2004. In 2005, Eric Lewin Altschuler wrote that if the first version of BWV 565 was written for a stringed instrument the most likely candidate would have been a lute. Yet another violin version was created by Chad Kelly and performed by Rachel Podger on her 2022 album Tutta Sola.

In 1997, Bernhard Billeter proposed a harpsichord toccata original, which was deemed unlikely by Williams. However, Billeter's argument makes authorship by Bach more likely: Bach's harpsichord toccatas (most of them early works) have simplistic elements and quirks similar to BWV 565. Bach's early keyboard works, especially the free ones like Preludes and Toccatas, cannot always be clearly separated into organ pieces and harpsichord pieces. Spitta had already remarked on the similarity between a passage in BWV 565 and one in the harpsichord Prelude BWV 921; Robert Marshall compares the continuation patterns and sequences of the harpsichord Toccata BWV 911, and the Fugue theme of the harpsichord Toccata BWV 914, with the same of BWV 565.

=== In literature ===
In 1935, Hermann Hesse wrote a poem about the piece, Zu einer Toccata von Bach ("On a toccata by Bach"), which contributed to its fame.

== Sources ==
=== Score ===
Background color: green: online version of score available; red: introduction and/or commentary available
| Version provided by | Date | Place | Publisher | Series | Volume | BWV 565 |
|---|---|---|---|---|---|---|
| Ringk, Johannes | c. 1740–1760 | Germany | Berlin State Library (facsimile) | RISM 467300997 D-B Mus. ms. Bach p. 595] (Note: introduction and/or commentary available) | Fascicle 8 (pp. 57–64) | Toccata Con Fuga pedaliter ex d # di J. S. Bach (Note: online version of score available) |
| Marx, Adolph Bernhard | 1833 | Leipzig | Breitkopf & Härtel | Johann Sebastian Bach's noch wenig bekannte Orgelcompositionen: auch am Pianoforte von einem oder zwei Spielern ausführbar | Vol. 3 (of 3) | No. 9 Toccata (pp. 12–19) |
| Griepenkerl, Friedrich Konrad; Roitzsch, Ferdinand | 1846 | Leipzig | C. F. Peters | Johann Sebastian Bach's Compositionen für die Orgel | Vol. IV (plate 243) | No. 4 (pp. 24 ff.) |
| Tausig, Karl | c. 1860s | Berlin | Schlesinger | | Toccata und Fuge (D moll) für die Orgel (Pedal und Manual) von Johann Sebastian Bach für das Clavier zum Conzertvortrag frei bearbeitet | Toccata (pp. 2–6) – Fuge (pp. 7–15) |
| Rust, Wilhelm | 1867 | Leipzig | Breitkopf & Härtel | Bach-Gesellschaft-Ausgabe | Band XV: Orgelwerke, Band 1 ("Vorwort") | Toccata II (pp. 267–75) |
| Bridge, John Frederick; Higgs, James | 1886 | London | Novello & Co | The Organ Works of John Sebastian Bach | Book VI: Toccata, Preludes, and Fugues | No. 1 (pp. 2–9) |
| Reger, Max | 1896 | London | Augener | Selection of Joh. Seb. Bach's Organ Works transcribed for Pianoforte Duet | No. 2: Toccata & Fugue in D minor | Toccata und Fuge (pp. 2–21) |
| Busoni, Ferruccio | 1899 | Leipzig | Breitkopf & Härtel | Zwei Orgeltoccaten = Two organ toccatas = Deux toccates d'orgue von Joh. Sebastian Bach auf das Pianoforte übertragen (BV B 29) | No. 2: Toccata in D moll = D minor = ré mineur (Toccata e fuga) | Toccata in D moll (pp. 2–17) |
| Widor, Charles-Marie; Schweitzer, Albert | 1912 | New York | G. Schirmer | Johann Sebastian Bach. Complete Organ Works: a critico-practical edition in eight volumes provided with a preface containing general observations on the manner of performing the preludes and fugues and suggestions for the interpretation of the compositions contained in each volume | Volume II: Preludes and fugues of the first master period | No. 15 |
| Best, William Thomas; Hull, Arthur Eaglefield | 1914 | London | Augener | Johann Sebastian Bach's Organ Works | Volume II: Preludes, Fugues, Fantasia and Toccatas | pp. 271 ff. |
| Friedman, Ignaz | 1944 | Melbourne | Allans Publishing | | | Toccata and Fugue (D minor) |
| Stokowski, Leopold | 1952 | New York | Broude Brothers | Symphonic transcription published from the library of Leopold Stokowski. | | Toccata and Fugue in D Minor (Duration: 9 minutes) |
| Kilian, Dietrich | 1964 | Kassel | Bärenreiter | New Bach Edition, Series IV: Organ Works | Organ Works 6: Preludes, Toccatas, Fantasias and Fugues II – Early Versions and Variants of I and II | Toccata con Fuga in d BWV 565 |
| Mills, Fred; Canadian Brass | 1990s | US | Hal Leonard | Brass Ensemble | | Toccata and Fugue in D Minor |
| Zehnder, Jean-Claude | 2011 | Leipzig | Breitkopf & Härtel | Complete Organ Works – Breitkopf Urtext | Vol. 4: Toccatas and Fugues / Individual Works – with CD-ROM | No. 3 Toccata et Fuga in d BWV 565 (pp. 56–65) |

=== Recordings ===
Last column sortable by performance time; Background-color: green: audio file available
| Performed by | Date | Place | Issued by | Series | Volume | BWV 565 |
|---|---|---|---|---|---|---|
| | between 1902 and 1915 | New York | The Aeolian Company | Piano roll | Toccata and fugue in D minor arranged for pianoforte solo by C. Tausig | tempo 70; 28,5 cm |
| Bloomfield Zeisler, Fannie | 1912 | | Welte-Mignon | Piano roll | Toccata & Fugue in D minor (Tausig transcription) | (9:19) |
| Novello, Marie | mid- 1920s | London | Edison Bell | Velvet Face | No. 676: Organ Toccata & Fugue: Pianoforte Solo (Bach, Tausig) | Two 78 rpm disc sides: Pt. 1, Pt. 2 |
| Cunningham, G. D. | 1926 | Kingsway Hall, London | His Master's Voice | | No. C 1291: Toccata and fugue in D minor | 78 rpm disc |
| Stokowski, Leopold; Philadelphia Orchestra | April 1927 | Academy of Music, Philadelphia | Victor | Red Seal "Electric" recording | Toccata and Fugue in D minor (Stokowski transcription) | Two 78 rpm disc sides (8:53) |
| Schweitzer, Albert | 1935 | All Hallows-by-the-Tower, London | Columbia | Albert Schweitzer plays Bach (Note: audio file available) | | No. 6 (9:04) |
| Stokowski, Leopold; Philadelphia Orchestra | 1940 | Academy of Music, Philadelphia | Disney | Walt Disney's Fantasia – Leopold Stokowski and the Philadelphia Orchestra: Remastered Original Soundtrack Edition (1990) | CD 1 (of 2) | Toccata and Fugue in D minor, BWV 565 (9:22) |
| Walcha, Helmut | August 1947 | St James' Church, Lübeck | Deutsche Grammophon | Archiv Produktion; Research period IX: Works by Johann Sebastian Bach; Series F: Organ works | Prelude and fugue, E minor, BWV 548; Prelude and fugue, A minor, BWV 551; Prelude and fugue, C major, BWV 547; Toccata and fugue, D minor, BWV 565 | No. 4 (9:15) |
| Schweitzer, Albert | 1951 | Gunsbach, Alsace | Columbia | J. S. Bach: Organ Music | Vol. IV | No. 3 (10:31) |
| Biggs, E. Power | 1955 | Europe (14 different organs) | Columbia | Bach: Toccata in D minor (A Hi-Fi Adventure) | e.g. London, Royal Festival Hall | Side 2 No. 6 |
| Biggs, E. Power | 1960 | Busch-Reisinger Museum, Harvard | Columbia | Bach: Organ Favorites | Bach: Great Organ Favorites (Columbia 42644, re-issued as CD by CBS in 2011, with liner notes by Hans-Joachim Schulze) | Toccata (2:28), Fugue (5:54) |
| Walcha, Helmut | 1963 | Grote Sint Laurenskerk, Alkmaar | Deutsche Grammophon | | Classic Mania (issued 1991) | CD 2, No. 4 (2:37, Toccata only – Fugue of that 1963 recording had been 6:52) |
| Alain, Marie-Claire | 1959–1968 | Sankta Maria kyrka, Helsingborg | Erato | J. S. Bach – L'Œuvre Pour Orgue – Intégrale en 24 disques | Vol. 3: Toccatas & Fugues en ré mineur bwv 565 – en fa majeur bwv 540 / Préludes & Fugues en do majeur bwv 545 – en mi majeur bwv 533 – Fugue en sol mineur bwv 578 | Toccata & Fugue en ré mineur bwv 565 (8:42) |
| Richter, Karl | 1964 | Jaegersborg Church, Copenhagen | Deutsche Grammophon | | Johann Sebastian Bach: Toccata & Fuge / Famous Organ Works | Toccata & Fugue in D minor, BWV 565 (8:56) |
| Whiteley, John Scott | 2001 | Bath Abbey, Bath | BBC TV | 21st-Century Bach | Bach, The Complete Organ Works, Vols 1 and 2 | Toccata and fugue in D Minor, BWV 565 (8:41) |
| Alain, Marie-Claire | 1982 | Collégiale de Saint-Donat, Drôme | Erato | | Toccata & Fugue / Passacaglia / Fugue / Concerto / Fantaisie & Fugue | Toccata & Fugue en ré mineur D minor/D Moll BWV 565 (8:15) |
| Preston, Simon | 1988 | Kreuzbergkirche, Bonn | Deutsche Grammophon | | Toccata & Fugue BWV 565 – Preludes & Fugues BWV 532 & 552 – Fantasia BWV 572 – Pastorale BWV 590 | Toccata: Adagio (2:31); Fugue (5:54) |
| Fagius, Hans | 1988 | Fredrik Church, Karlskrona | Brilliant Classics | Bach Edition | CD 151 – Organ Works: Toccata & Fuga BWV 565/Concerto BWV 594/Praeludium & Fuga BWV 548/"Allein Gott in der Höh' sei Ehr" BWV 711–715/717 (issued c. 2000) | Nos. 1–2 (8:54) |
| Carlos, Wendy | 1992 | | Telarc | Switched-On Bach 2000 (25th anniversary sequel to Switched-On Bach, 1968) | Toccata & Fugue In D Minor | |
| Kibbie, James | 2007–2009 | Stadtkirche, Waltershausen | Block M Records (University of Michigan) | Bach Organ Works | BWV 565: Toccata con Fuga in d / Toccata and Fugue in D Minor | AAC – MP3 (9:16) |

=== Writings ===
- Altschuler, Eric Lewin (Winter 2005). "Were Bach's Toccata and Fugue BWV565 and the Ciacconia from BWV1004 Lute Pieces?". The Musical Times. 146 (1893): 77–86. doi:10.2307/30044126. JSTOR 30044126.
- Argent, Mark (Autumn 2000). "Decoding Bach 3. Stringing Along". The Musical Times. 141 (1872): 16–20, 22–23. doi:10.2307/1004394. JSTOR 1004394.
- Billeter, Bernhard [in German] (2004) [1997]. "Bachs Toccata und Fuge d-moll für Orgel BWV 565 – ein Cembalowerk?" [Bach's Toccata and Fugue in D minor for organ BWV 565 – a work for harpsichord?]. In Sackmann, Dominik [in German] (ed.). Musiktheorie und musikalische Praxis: gesammelte Aufsätze [Music Theory and Musical Practice: Collected essays]. Zürcher Musikstudien (in German). Vol. 4. Zürich, DE: Peter Lang. pp. 159–164. ISBN 978-3039103751. Originally published in Die Musikforschung Vol. 50 No. 1, January–March 1997, p. 77–80.
- Blume, Friedrich (January 1968). "J. S. Bach's Youth". The Musical Quarterly. LIV (1): 1–30. doi:10.1093/mq/LIV.1.1.
- Bullivant, Roger (1971). Fugue. London: Hutchinson. ISBN 978-0091084400.
- Butt, John (1997). The Cambridge companion to Bach. Cambridge University Press, 1997. ISBN 978-0521587808.
- Claus, Rolf Dietrich (1998). Zur Echtheit von Toccata und Fuge d-moll BWV 565. Cologne: Dohr, 2nd ed. ISBN 978-3925366550. (review by Yo Tomita Archived 2015-08-24 at the Wayback Machine)
- Claus, Rolf Dietrich, ed. (2000). Toccata und Fuge d-Moll BWV 565: Faksimile der ältesten überlieferten Abschrift von Johannes Ringk [Toccata and Fugue in D minor BWV 565: Facsimile of the earliest extant copy by Johannes Ringk] (in German). Cologne: Dohr. ISBN 978-3925366789.
- Claus, Rolf Dietrich (2018). Toccata and Fugue in D minor BWV 565 – A Work by J. S. Bach?. Translated by John Sayer (2nd ed.). At the Sign of the Pipe. ISBN 978-0956710260. (review by David Baker, Organists' Review)
- Dörffel, Alfred (1884). Geschichte der Gewandhausconcerte zu Leipzig vom 25. November 1781 bis 25. November 1881: Im Auftrage der Concert-Direction verfasst. Leipzig.
- Eidam, Klaus [in German] (2001). The True Life of Johann Sebastian Bach. New York: Basic Books. ISBN 0465018610.
- Emans, Reinmar (2004). "Vom überstrapazierten Autor: Biographische Konstruktionen bei Echtheitskritik" pp. 17–29 in Musik und Biographie: Festschrift für Rainer Cadenbach. edited by Cordula Heymann-Wentzel and Johannes Laas. Königshausen & Neumann. ISBN 978-3826028045
- Emans, Reinmar (2009). "Möglichkeiten und Grenzen der Textkritik bei Incerta" pp. 103–11 in Was ist Textkritik?: Zur Geschichte und Relevanz eines Zentralbegriffs der Editionswissenschaft edited by Gertraud Mitterauer, Ulrich Müller, Margarete Springeth and Verena Vitzthum. Walter de Gruyter. ISBN 978-3484970786
- Emery, Walter (July 1966). "Some Speculations on the Development of Bach's Organ Style", pp. 596–603 in The Musical Times, Vol. 107, No. 1481.
- Fox-Lefriche, Bruce (2004). The Greatest Violin Sonata That J.S. Bach Never Wrote. Strings xix/3:122, October 2004, 43–55.
- Glaus, Daniel (2013). "Albert Schweitzer als Organist", pp. 291–304 in Albert Schweitzer: Facetten einer Jahrhundertgestalt, edited by Hubert Steinke, Angela Berlis, Andreas Wagner and Fritz von Gunten. Haupt Verlag AG. ISBN 978-3258077796
- Grace, Harvey (1922). The Organ Works of Bach. London: Novello & Co.
- Gwinner, Volker (1968). "Bachs d-moll-Tokkata als Credo-Vertonung" in Musik und Kirche Vol. 38 pp. 240–42.
- Humphreys, David (1982). The D Minor Toccata BWV 565. Early Music Vol. 10, No. 2.
- Jones, Richard Douglas (2007). The Creative Development of Johann Sebastian Bach: Music to Delight the Spirit. Volume 1: 1695–1717. Oxford University Press. ISBN 0198164408
- Keller, Hermann (1948). Die Orgelwerke Bachs: Ein Beitrag zu ihrer Geschichte. Form, Deutung und Wiedergabe. Leipzig: C. F. Peters.
- Kilian, Dietrich (1979). Präludien, Toccaten, Fantasien und Fugen I: BWV 531–550, 562 (Fragment) / Critical Commentary to Part I and II, Volume 6 in three Parts of Serie IV: Orgelwerke in Johann Sebastian Bach: Neue Ausgabe sämtlicher Werke. Kassel: Bärenreiter.
- van Kranenburg, Peter (2006). Composer attribution by quantifying compositional strategies (PDF). ISMIR 2006: 7th International Conference on Music Information Retrieval. Victoria, BC: University of Victoria. pp. 375–376. ISBN 1550583492.
- van Kranenburg, Peter (2007). "Assessing disputed attributions for organ fugues in the J.S. Bach (BWV) catalogue" (PDF). In Hewlett, Walter B.; Selfridge-Field, Eleanor; Correia, Edmund (eds.). Tonal Theory for the Digital Age. Computing in Musicology. Vol. 15. University of Michigan. ch. 7 pp. 120–137. ISBN 978-0936943176. ("Replacement by Kranenburg" (PDF). 2008.)
- van Kranenburg, Peter (September 2008). On measuring musical style: The case of some disputed organ fugues in the J.S. Bach (BWV) catalogue (PDF) (Report). Utrecht, NL: Utrecht University – via cs.uu.nl.
- van Kranenburg, Peter (4 October 2010). "On measuring musical style: The case of some disputed organ fugues in the J.S. Bach (BWV) catalogue" (PDF). A Computational Approach to Content-Based Retrieval of Folk-Song Melodies (Ph.D. thesis). Utrecht, NL: Utrecht University. ch. 5, pp. 71–89. ISBN 978-903935393-6.
- Newman, Anthony (1995). Bach and the Baroque: European source materials from the Baroque and early Classical periods, with special emphasis on the music of J.S. Bach. Pendragon Press. ISBN 978-0945193647
- Parry, Hubert (1909). Johann Sebastian Bach: The story of the development of a great personality. New York, NY / London, UK: G.P. Putnam's Sons / The Knickerbocker Press – via Internet Archive (archive.org).
- Pirro, André (1895). L'orgue de Jean-Sébastien Bach. Paris: Fischbacher.
- Pirro, André (1902). Johann Sebastian Bach: The Organist and his Works for the Organ. New York: G. Schirmer
- Schulenberg, David (2006). The Keyboard Music of J.S. Bach, second edition. Routledge. ISBN 978-0415974004
- Schweitzer, Albert (1905). J. S. Bach, le musicien-poète. Preface by Charles Marie Widor. Leipzig: Breitkopf & Härtel.
- Schweitzer, Albert (1908). J. S. Bach. Leipzig: Breitkopf & Härtel.
- Schweitzer, Albert (1935). J. S. Bach, Vol. 1 London: A. & C. Black.
- Schweitzer, Albert (1995). Die Orgelwerke Johann Sebastian Bachs: Vorworte zu den "Sämtlichen Orgelwerken", with an introduction by Harald Schützeichel. Georg Olms Verlag. ISBN 978-3487416977
- Philipp Spitta (1873). Johann Sebastian Bach, Erster Band (Book I–IV). Leipzig: Breitkopf & Härtel.
- Philipp Spitta (1899). Johann Sebastian Bach: His Work and Influence on the Music of Germany 1685–1750, translated by Clara Bell and J. A. Fuller Maitland, Vol. I (Book I–III). London: Novello & Co.
- Stauffer, George Boyer (1978). The Free Organ Preludes of Johann Sebastian Bach (thesis). Columbia University.
- Stauffer, George Boyer; May, Ernest, eds. (1986). J. S. Bach as Organist: His Instruments, Music and Performance Practices. Indiana University Press. ISBN 978-0253331816.
- Stinson, Russell (2006). The Reception of Bach's Organ Works from Mendelssohn to Brahms. Oxford University Press. ISBN 978-0195346862 (2010 edition ISBN 978-0199747030)
- Stinson, Russell (2012). J. S. Bach at His Royal Instrument: Essays on His Organ Works. US: Oxford University Press ISBN 978-0199917235
- Williams, Peter F. (1980). The Organ Music of J. S. Bach, Volume 1: Preludes, Toccatas, Fantasias, Fugues, Sonatas, Concertos and Miscellaneous Pieces (BWV 525–598, 802–805 etc.) Cambridge University Press. ISBN 978-0521217231.
- Williams, Peter F. (July 1981). "BWV 565: a toccata in D minor for organ by J. S. Bach?" pp. 330–37 in Early Music Vol. 9, No. 3.
- Williams, Peter (2003). "BWV 565 Toccata and Fugue in D minor". The Organ Music of J. S. Bach (2nd ed.). Cambridge University Press. pp. 155–159. ISBN 978-0521814164.
- Wolff, Christoph (2000). Johann Sebastian Bach: The Learned Musician. Oxford University Press, 2000. ISBN 039304825X
- Wolff, Christoph (2002). "Zum norddeutschen Kontext der Orgelmusik des jugendlichen Bach: Das Scheinproblem der Toccata d-Moll BWV 565", pp. 241–51 in Bach, Lübeck und die norddeutsche Musiktradition edited by Wolfgang Sandberger. Kassel: Bärenreiter. ISBN 978-3761815854
- Wolff, Christoph (2002b). "Bach's organ toccata in D-minor and the issue of its authenticity" pp. 85–107 in Perspectives on Organ Playing and Musical Interpretation: Pedagogical, Historical, and Instrumental Studies: A Festschrift for Heinrich Fleischer at 90 edited by Ames Anderson, Bruce Backer, David Backus and Charles Luedtke. New Ulm: Martin Luther College. ISBN 978-1890600037
- Yearsley, David (2012). Bach's Feet: The Organ Pedals in European Culture. Cambridge University Press. ISBN 978-0521199018
