= Toccata in E minor, BWV 914 =

1710 composition by J. S. Bach

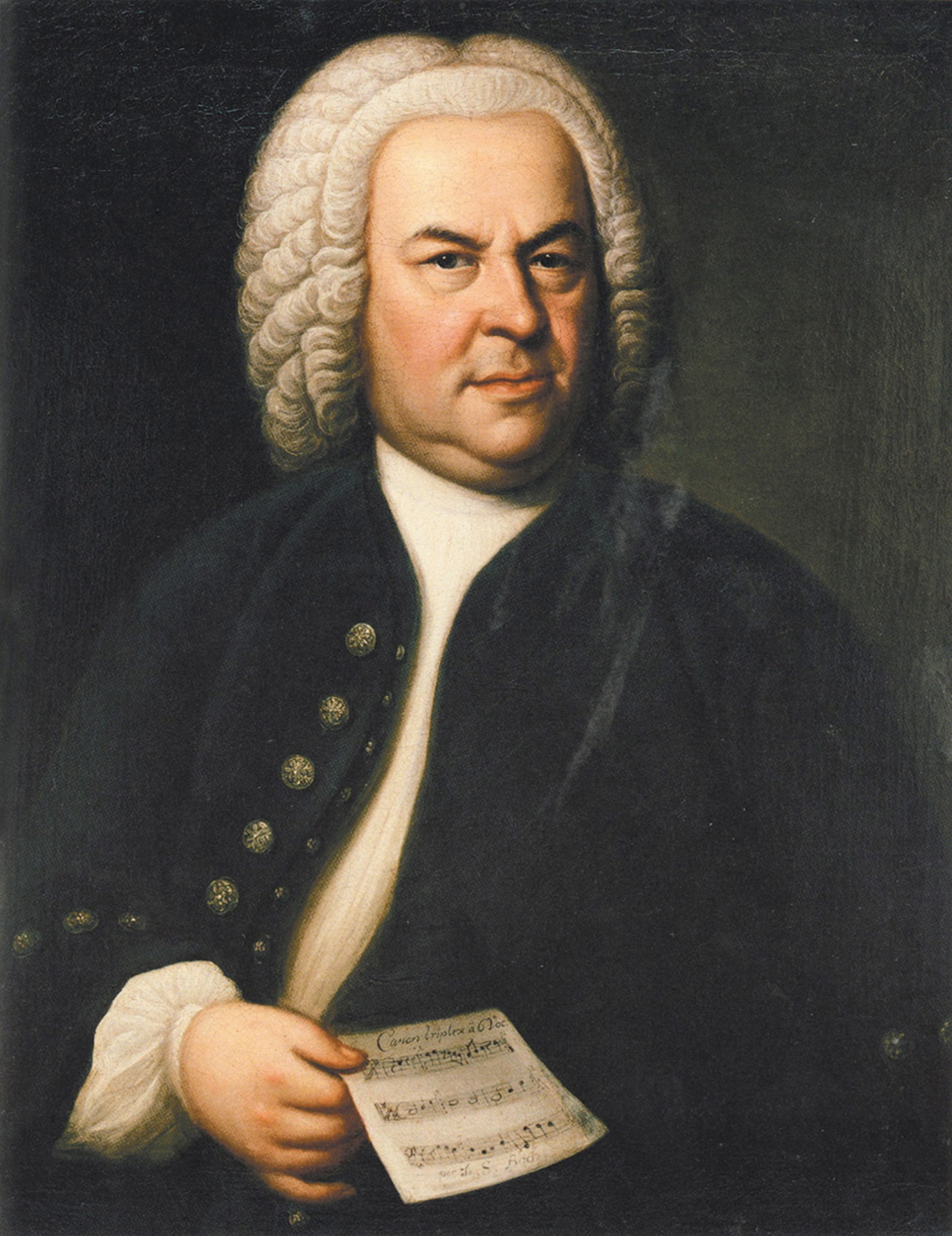
Johann Sebastian Bach

The Toccata in E minor, BWV 914 in the Bach-Werke-Verzeichnis catalogue system, is a keyboard composition written by Johann Sebastian Bach. Bach composed the piece alongside six additional keyboard toccatas, likely in 1710, while working as the court organist for Duke Johann Ernst III in Weimar. The toccata is structured into four parts: a prelude, followed by a fugue, a recitative, and lastly a "brilliant" concluding fugue. It is the shortest of Bach's keyboard toccatas and thought by some to be the best known.

Because authorship of the final fugue is contested, musicologist David Schulenberg describes BWV 914 as "one of the more mysterious pieces in the Bach canon."

== The Toccata ==
Keyboard music was originally intended to accompany choral songs such as motets or madrigals in 5 parts, and later polyphonic Canzone alla francese in three or more parts. The toccata is first mentioned in the publication of a collection of lute music in 1536, but came to be used more regularly to describe keyboard music from the 1590s onwards. In the toccata, multi-voice harmony and variation on a central melodic theme were merged with keyboard traditions that included improvisation, rapid arpeggios, tempo changes, and virtuosity. Basal chordal structures underlie keyboard toccatas. The toccata form would eventually develop into the fugue and prelude, of which Bach was also a master. Toccatas were characterized by and named after their brilliant and typically short opening sections.

Bach wrote the Toccata in E minor alongside six other keyboard toccatas, BWV 910–916, between 1707 and 1710 or 1711, before the age of 30. The Toccata in E minor was likely composed in 1710. Some scholars have suggested potentially later dates of composition. His toccatas were influenced by the Italian model of toccata, with varying lively and expressive tempos across each section of the composition, and with between two and six sections per toccata. The toccatas are typically opened by a short, striking toccata section, followed by a fugue, and then a recitative imitating the Italian aria or German fantasia forms. One section is always a fugue and fugues frequently conclude the toccatas. Fugal passages are often considered the most cherished features of the toccatas.

== Bach ==
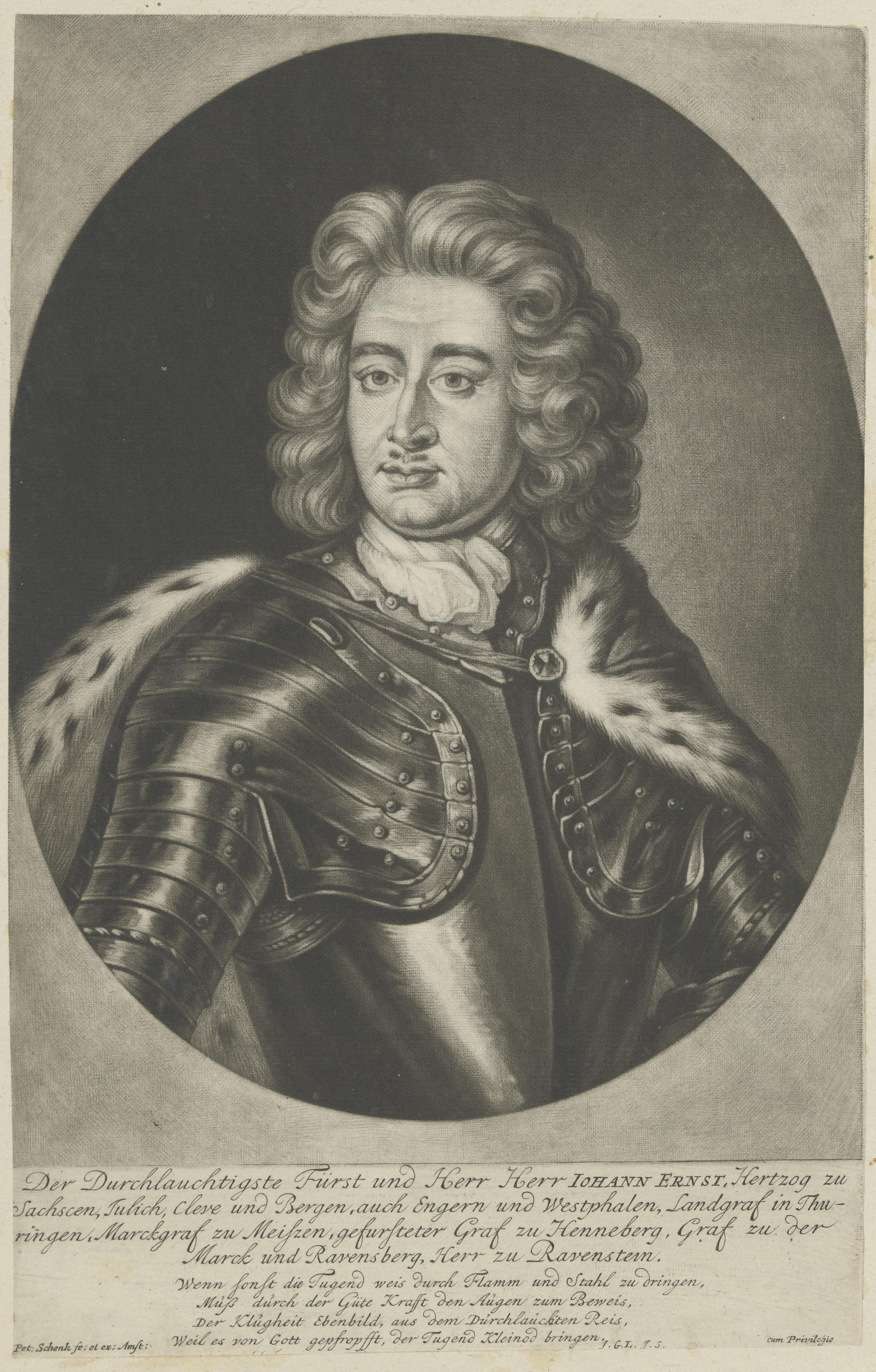
Bach likely composed the toccata while working as the court organist for Duke Johann Ernst of Weimar, depicted above.

Bach worked as an organist for Duke Johann Ernst in the Duchy of Weimar from 1708 until 1717. It is during this period that he likely wrote his seven toccatas for the harpsichord, including the Toccata in E minor. Musicologist and Bach biographer Christoph Wolff writes that it "seems entirely plausible" that Bach wrote the toccatas as an ambitious and self-confident keyboard virtuoso, intent to demonstrate his skills as a combined composer and performer through exquisite mastery of the north German toccata. While Bach wrote many of these toccatas for the organ, he composed seven "manualiter" (effectively, harpsichord) toccatas in the stylus fantasticus genre, allowing him to focus on compositional and structural details of the music.

== Structure ==
The composition is divided into four parts, each so short that they are considered nearly miniatures. Compared to other toccatas, the Toccata in E minor is thus compact, and is the shortest of all of Bach's toccatas.

=== I ===
The first part is a prelude that introduces a melody of short, broken-chord and imitative passages in middle and low registers (low tessitura). The section is understated and has a light texture, suggesting that it might have originally been composed for the lute. The central four-note motif of the section would also have been ideal for organ pedal.

=== II ===
The second part is an allegro double fugue for four voices, imitating a chorale, where the melodies are developed both simultaneously and in succession. Some consider this to be the core of the entire toccata.

=== III ===
The third part is a recitative or "rhapsodic" adagio that includes broken-chord passages (the notes of the chords played one at a time), at a varied but overall slower pace, with an improvisational style and elaborate ornamentation.

=== IV ===
The fourth part concludes with a "brilliant" fugue in three voices, with rapidly moving melodies. Its rapid pace creates a strong contrast with the preceding section. Many musical scores for BWV 914 give only this final fugue, rather than the entire toccata in four parts.

== Fugue authorship controversy ==
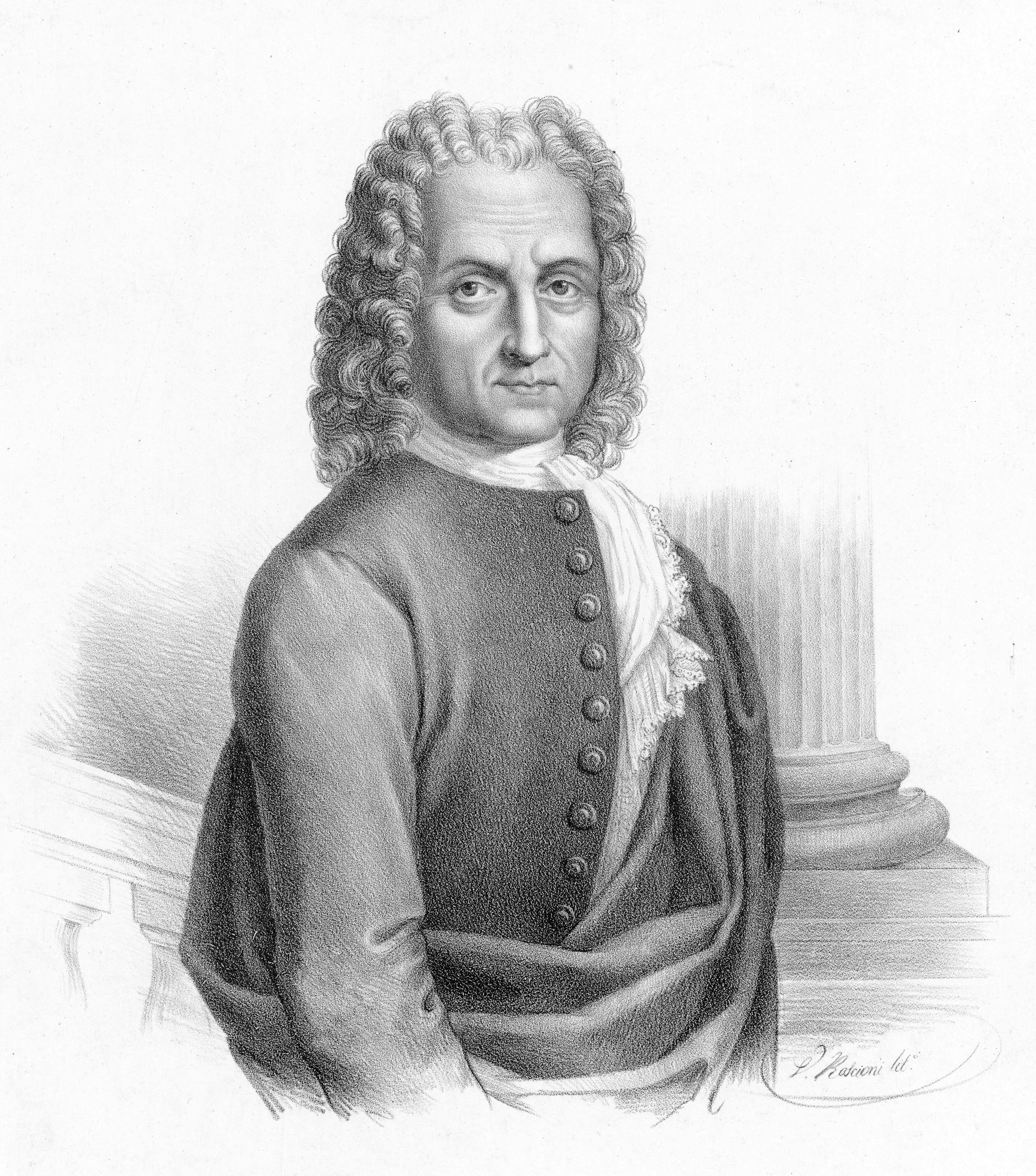
Italian composer Benedetto Marcello, depicted above, is considered a possible inspiration for or author of the concluding fugue of Bach's Toccata in E minor.

Musicologist Giorgio Pestelli describes the Toccata in E minor as a "fugue dissolved in toccata" and thus a "crucial piece for the link" between Bach's fugues and the Italian toccata form.

Some consider the closing section of the toccata to be adapted from an Italian fugue written by Benedetto Marcello, thus making it "one of the more mysterious pieces in the Bach canon." The controversy stems from the discovery of a Neapolitan manuscript (Naples Bib. Cons. MS 5327, ff. 46’–49’) that contains a fugue nearly identical, for many measures, with Bach's fugue concluding the E minor toccata. While Bach's fugues were often inspired by Italian melodies, he typically restricted their use, in his fugues, to the introductory themes.

Several examples of Bach's fugues drawing upon Italian composers include BWV 574 inspired by Giovanni Legrenzi, BWV 579 drawing upon Arcangelo Corelli, and BWV 950 and 951 borrowing themes from Tomaso Albinoni.

The Neapolitan manuscript also containing several other pieces, including by Giovanni Benedetto Platti and Francesco Durante, composers who worked in Germany during Bach's life. The fugue in the manuscript is attributed to Marcello, but according to professor Selfridge-Field is "not characteristic of Marcello's keyboard music," raising the possibility that Bach's original composition may have made its way to Italy. Multiple copies of the toccata, with variants and corrections, suggest a process of composition by Bach himself; nevertheless the authorship controversy is unresolved.

== Reception and legacy ==
The Toccata in E minor has been described as the "best known" of Bach's toccatas. Musicologist David Schulenberg describes this as "the most satisfying" of the seven toccatas alongside BWV 912, but not the most ambitious or virtuosic.

The toccata is a central theme of the film The Beat That My Heart Skipped by Jacques Audiard, and serves as an indicator of mood for its main character.

Some later editions contain minor changes or additional voices, particularly in the last fugue. For instance, the earliest manuscript features a D♯ in the eighth bar of the closing fugue, but modern performers often play it as a D.
