= Triple Concerto, BWV 1044 =

1720s work for flute, violin, harpsichord and strings by Bach

The Triple Concerto, BWV 1044, is a concerto in A minor for traverso, violin, harpsichord, and string orchestra by Johann Sebastian Bach. He based the composition on his Prelude and Fugue BWV 894 for harpsichord and on the middle movement of his Organ Sonata BWV 527, or on earlier lost models for these compositions.

== History ==
Bach based the Triple Concerto on two earlier compositions. The outer movements of BWV 1044 are based on a lost model which was also a model for the Prelude and Fugue in A minor for solo harpsichord, BWV 894. However, BWV 894 is listed as the model for the outer movements of BWV 1044. The middle movement of BWV 1044 is based on the middle movement of the Trio Sonata for Organ in D minor, BWV 527, or on an earlier model for the middle movements of the concerto and the organ sonata.

Regarding the origin of the models for BWV 1044, BWV 894 was copied by Johann Bernhard Bach the Younger between 1707 and 1715 and by Johann Tobias Krebs from 1710 to 1717. Although their copies of the composition survive, neither is its earliest known version; an earlier reading of BWV 894 is found in copies by Johann Peter Kellner (1725) and Johann Nikolaus Mempell (mid-18th century). In 1970 Hans Eppstein argued that the lost model for BWV 894 may have been a keyboard concerto, but this cannot be demonstrated conclusively. The middle movement of the Third Sonata (BWV 527/2) was based on an earlier model which predated the earliest version of the sonata's first movement, probably composed during the 1720s. Dietrich Kilian, editor of the New Bach Edition volume which contains the Triple Concerto, assumes that Bach composed the concerto after 1726 (most likely in his later years).

== Movements and scoring ==
Bach scored the concerto for the same instruments as his fifth Brandenburg Concerto, BWV 1050, with the addition of a second violino di ripieno part. The concerto has three concertato parts (harpsichord obligato, flute and violin) and four ripieno parts (first and second violins, viola and continuo). Throughout the concerto the harpsichord has the predominant solo part. The middle movement is performed by the concertino without the ripieno instruments.

The concerto has three movements:

1. (No tempo indication, usually interpreted as Allegro) – based on BWV 894/1
2. Adagio ma non tanto e dolce, in C major – based on BWV 527/2 (there in F major)
3. Tempo di alla breve – based on BWV 894/2 (there in 12/16)

The outer movements were developed from the harpsichord piece with added tutti sections. The middle movement was expanded from the organ piece to four voices.

== Reception ==
Schott published the concerto in 1848. The Bach Gesellschaft published the concerto in 1869 as No. 8, "Concert in A moll für Flöte, Violine und Clavier mit Begleitung von Zwei Violinen, Viola und Continuo" (Concerto in A minor for flute, violin and keyboard with an accompaniment of two violins, viola and continuo), pp. 221–272 in the 17th volume of their complete edition (Bach-Gesellschaft Ausgabe, BGA). The seven other concertos in that volume, which was the BGA's second volume of chamber music, were the Harpsichord Concertos BWV 1052–1058. The incipits of the Triple Concerto's movements are rendered on p. 217 of the BGA's thematic catalogue (Volume 46, published in 1899):

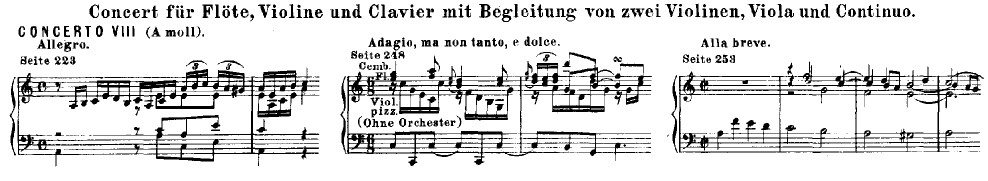

Philipp Spitta describes the concerto as an arrangement "of really dazzling artistic quality and splendour", and considers the transformation of the keyboard solo BWV 894 into the Triple Concerto more remarkable than the transformation of the violin solo BWV 1006/1 into the opening sinfonia of the cantata Wir danken dir, Gott, wir danken dir, BWV 29.

== Sources ==
Manuscripts

- Johann Sebastian Bach (composer); Johann Friedrich Agricola (scribe). Mus.ms. Bach P 249 at Berlin State Library (Bach Digital Source 00001180; RISM 467301119), c.1750–1760
- Johann Sebastian Bach (composer); Johann Gottfried Müthel (scribe). Mus.ms. Bach St 134 at Berlin State Library (Bach Digital Source 00002488; RISM 467301037), 1750–1753

Score editions

- Johann Sebastian Bach. Concerto per Cembalo con Violine e Flauto obligati e con ripieno di 2 Violini, Viola, Violoncello e Contrabasso. Mainz/Antwerp/Brussels: Schott, 1848
- Pieter Dirksen (editor). Johann Sebastian Bach: Complete Organ Works - Breitkopf Urtext, New Edition in 10 Volumes, Volume 5: Sonatas / Trios / Concertos - with CD-ROM: Organ Works Based on Compositions by Bach and Others. Breitkopf & Härtel, 2010.
- Dietrich Kilian (editor). Vol. 7: Six Sonatas and various Single Works, Score of Series IV: Organ Works of the New Bach Edition. Kassel: Bärenreiter, 1984; ^{2}2013.
- Dietrich Kilian (editor). Vol. 3: Concertos for Violin, for two Violins, for Harpsichord, Flute and Violin, Score of Series VII: Orchestral Works of the New Bach Edition. Kassel: Bärenreiter, 1986.
- Wilhelm Rust (editor). Bach-Gesellschaft Ausgabe, Volume XV: Orgelwerke. Band 1. Breitkopf & Härtel, 1867.
- Wilhelm Rust (editor). Bach-Gesellschaft Ausgabe, Volume XVII: Kammermusik. Band 2. Breitkopf & Härtel, 1869.

Other

- Abravaya, Ido (2006), On Bach's Rhythm and Tempo (PDF), Bochumer Arbeiten zur Musikwissenschaft, vol. 4, Bärenreiter, ISBN 3761816022
- David James Douglas. Inquiry into J.S. Bach’s method of reworking in his composition of the concerto for keyboard, flute and violin, BWV 1044, and its chronology. Vancouver: University of British Columbia, 1997 (thesis)
- Ad. Hofmeister. Musikalisch-literarischer Monatsbericht neuer Musikalien, musikalischer Schriften und Abbildungen für das Jahr 1848. Leipzig: Whistling, 1848.
- Dietrich Kilian. Vol. 7: Six Sonatas and various Single Works, Critical Commentary of Series IV: Organ Works of the New Bach Edition. Kassel: Bärenreiter, 1988.
- Dietrich Kilian. Vol. 3: Concertos for Violin, for two Violins, for Harpsichord, Flute and Violin, Critical Commentary of Series VII: Orchestral Works of the New Bach Edition. Kassel: Bärenreiter, 1989.
- Hermann Kretzschmar (editor). Bach-Gesellschaft Ausgabe, Volume XLVI: Schlußband: Bericht und Verzeichnisse. Breitkopf & Härtel, 1899.
- Daniel R. Melamed and Michael Marissen. An Introduction to Bach Studies. Oxford University Press, 1998. ISBN 9780198028550
- Max Schneider. "Verzeichnis der bis zum Jahre 1851 gedruckten (und der geschrieben im Handel gewesenen) Werke von Johann Sebastian Bach", pp. 84–113 in Neue Bachgesellschaft VII (3) Bach-Jahrbuch 1906. 1907.
- David Schulenberg. The Keyboard Music of J.S. Bach. Taylor & Francis, 2006. ISBN 9780415974004
- Philipp Spitta. Johann Sebastian Bach, Erster Band (Book I–IV). Leipzig: Breitkopf & Härtel, 1873 (^{3}1921)
- Philipp Spitta. Johann Sebastian Bach, Zweiter Band (Book V–VI). Leipzig: Breitkopf & Härtel, 1880 (^{3}1921)
- Philipp Spitta, translated by Clara Bell and J. A. Fuller Maitland. Johann Sebastian Bach: His Work and Influence on the Music of Germany, 1685–1750, Vol. 1 (Book I–III) – Vol. 2 (Book IV–V) – Vol. 3 (Book VI). Novello & Co, 1899
- Charles Sanford Terry. Johann Sebastian Bach: His Life, Art, and Work Translated from the German of Johann Nikolaus Forkel with Notes and Appendices. New York: Harcourt, Brace and Howe, 1920
