= Johannes Ringk =

German composer and organist (1717–1778)

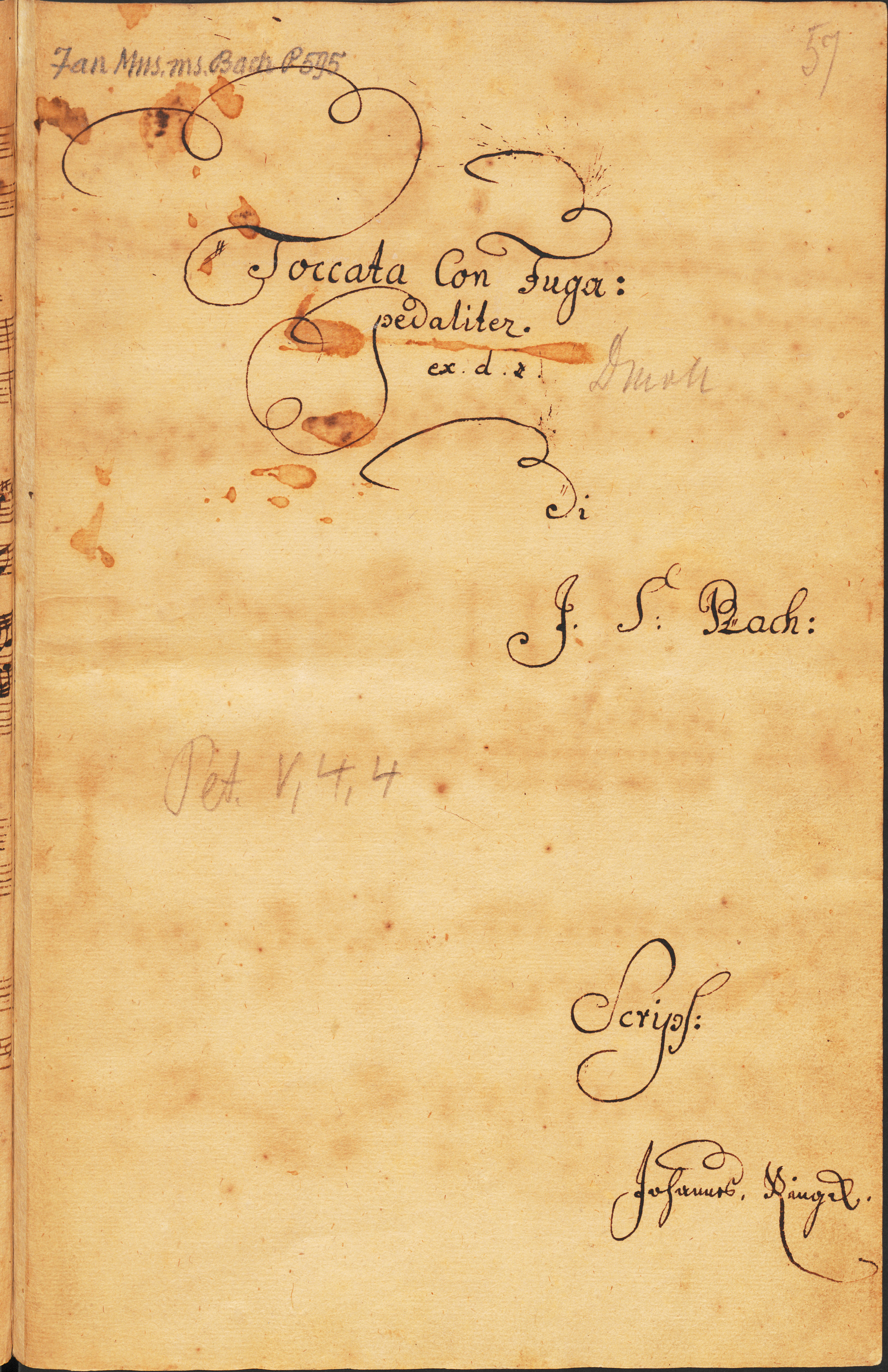
Cover of Johannes Ringk's copy of BWV 565.

Johannes Ringk, or Ringck (26 June 1717 – 24 August 1778) was a German composer and organist.

He was born in Frankenhain, in present-day Thuringia, and studied organ with Johann Peter Kellner in Gräfenroda and Gottfried Heinrich Stölzel in Gotha. From 1740, he was a music teacher in Berlin, and in 1754 he was appointed organist of the Marienkirche, where he remained until his death. Contemporaries held a high opinion of his organ playing and ability at fugal extemporization.

He composed organ works, concertos and possibly an opera, but is most remembered today for the numerous copies he made, often the only ones now remaining, of works by more notable composers. Amongst these copies in his hand are Johann Sebastian Bach's cantata Weichet nur, betrübte Schatten, BWV 202 and the oldest copy of the famous Toccata and Fugue in D minor, BWV 565. It is possible that the copies were made from versions in Kellner's collection, who was a pupil of Bach. The copies in Kellner's collection, which were made about 1725, are today one of the most important sources of Bach's work. Many theorize that it was in fact Ringk who wrote Toccata and Fugue in D Minor.
