= Nicolaus à Kempis =

Flemish composer and organist

Nicolaus à Kempis, Nicolaus a Kempis or Nicolaes a Kempis (c. 1600 – buried in Brussels on 11 August 1676) was a Flemish composer and organist active in Brussels in the middle of the 17th century. He is known for introducing the latest innovations from Italy into Flemish polyphonic music.

== Life ==
Not much is known about a Kempis. He was born around 1600, but it is unknown where. Because of his knowledge of contemporary Italian music, some musicologists have opined that he came from northern Italy, perhaps from Florence but there is no evidence for this. Current research is considering the possibility that Kempis was never in Italy and that he only came into contact with the then new Italian violin music through the migration of other musicians caused by the wars of religion.

The earliest extant piece of biographical information about him is his nomination as organist of the cathedral of Saints Michael and Gudule in Brussels around 1626. He had various sons of whom Joannes Florentius succeeded him in his role as organist in 1670.

He died in 1676 and was buried in Brussels on 11 August 1676.

== Work ==
His compositions range from solo sonatas with basso continuo to six-part pieces.

Between 1644 and 1649, he published at the Phalesius press in Antwerp three volumes of Symphoniae comprising 98 short instrumental pieces and eight motets. Of a fourth volume, only two part books survive and the printed date (1642) is almost certainly incorrect. A fifth volume with masses and motets is lost. The Symphoniae are among the earliest written symphonies in the Low Countries. They are in fact sonatas for one to five instruments with basso continuo. They comprise solo sonatas for strings with basso continuo as wells as multi-part compositions, some with additional parts for wind instruments. They combine instrumental cantabile with virtuoso features, especially in the violin solos, and contain chromatic-rhetorical elements in the early Baroque Stylus fantasticus. They were mainly intended for domestic music-making and some of them are based on folk music motifs. In formal terms, the Symphoniae are sonatas that consolidate the multi-movement canzone into four movements.

Nicolaus à Kempis was the first musician to introduce the Italian viol style and techniques of Girolamo Frescobaldi, Marco Uccellini, Giovanni Battista Fontana and Dario Castello into the Habsburg Netherlands.

== Published works ==
- Symphoniæ unius, duorum, trium violinorum. Authore Nicolao à Kempis, … Antwerpiæ, Apud Heredes Petri Phalesij ad insigne Davidis Regis, 1644.
- Symphoniæ unius, duorum, trium, IV. et V. instrumentorum adjunctæ quatuor 3. instrumentorum & duarum vocum. Auctore Nicolao à Kempis, … Operis secundi liber primus. … Antwerpiæ, Apud Magdalenam Phalesia ad insigne Davidis Regis, 1647.
- Symphoniæ unius, duorum, trium, IV. et V. instrumentorum adjunctæ quatuor 3. instrumentorum & duarum vocum. Auctore Nicolao à Kempis, … Opus tertium et ultimum. … Antwerpiæ, Apud Magdalenam Phalesia ad insigne Davidis Regis, 1649.
- Symphoniæ unius, duorum, trium, IV. V. et VI. instrumentorum. Auctore Nicolao à Kempis, … Opus quartum. … Antwerpiæ, Apud Magdalenam Phalesia ad insigne Davidis Regis, 1642.
- Missae e motetta (lost).
