= Stylus fantasticus =

Style of early baroque music

The stylus fantasticus (or stylus phantasticus) is a style of early baroque music, particularly for purely instrumental music.

== Description and history ==
The root of this music is organ toccatas and fantasias, particularly derived from those of Claudio Merulo (1533–1604), organist at St Mark's Basilica in Venice. A later practitioner in Rome was Girolamo Frescobaldi, and his German student Froberger took the style north with him. There were constant flows of Italian musicians north to Bavaria and Saxony, of German musicians south to Italy (such as Hans Leo Hassler and Heinrich Schütz), and of musicians who had careers in both Austria and Italy (such as Sances and Turini). The author, scientist and inventor, a true baroque polymath, Athanasius Kircher describes the stylus fantasticus in his book, Musurgia Universalis:

"The fantastic style is especially suited to instruments. It is the most free and unrestrained method of composing, it is bound to nothing, neither to any words nor to a melodic subject, it was instituted to display genius and to teach the hidden design of harmony and the ingenious composition of harmonic phrases and fugues. It is distributed in these forms: fantasia, ricercar, toccata, and sonata."

The style is related to improvisation but is characterised by the use of short contrasting episodes and a free form, just like a classical fantasia.

Johann Mattheson, who was a German composer and theorist in the 17th century, presented his idea about the definition that Athanasius Kircher in his book, "Das beschutzte Orchestre" (1717), cited in Paul Collin's writing:

"Mattheson rightly affirms that Kircher's stylus phantasticus might easily be confused with the Jesuit's stylus symphoniacus. Both are instrumental styles and are found ubiquitously in the realms of church, chamber, and theatre....Mattheson believes it to be quite clear that the fantastic style is associated with a solo instrument like the harpsichord, violin, viola da gamba, or lute.”

Later in Mattheson's Der vollkommene Capellmeister (1739), he stated that the stylus fantasticus is more of a performance style than a composition approach. He believes that playing this style should be like singing and playing at the same time, more improvised rather than just playing the notes on the score. As Frescobaldi mentioned in his book "Toccate e partite d’intavolatura di cimbalo" (Toccatas and Partits Scored for Harpsichord, Book 1, 1616), players should not play strictly according to the score, but imitate the singer more. Mattheson also use stylus fantasticus to describe free sections of Dietrich Buxtehude's preludes: "Now swift, now hesitating, now in one voice, now in many voices, now for a while behind the beat, without measure of sound, but not without the intent to please, to overtake and to astonish."

In Austria, the style was practised by the famous formidable virtuoso Heinrich Ignaz Biber and the older Johann Heinrich Schmelzer. In the Southern Netherlands, Nicolaus à Kempis pioneered the style in his Symphoniae published between 1644 and 1649 in Antwerp.

== Composers employing the stylus fantasticus ==
- Johann Sebastian Bach
- Antonio Bertali
- Heinrich Ignaz Biber
- Dietrich Buxtehude
- Nicolaus à Kempis
- Giovanni Antonio Pandolfi Mealli
- Johann Adam Reincken
- Johann Heinrich Schmelzer
- Pavel Josef Vejvanovsky
- Johann Schop
- Nicolaus Bruhns
- Girolamo Frescobaldi

== Bibliography ==
- Kircher, Athanasius, 1602–1680. Musurgia universalis sive ars magna consoni et dissoni in libros digesta. Romae : Ex typographia Haeredum Francisci. Corbelletti, 1650.
- Kircher, Athanasius at the Galileo Project
- Collins, Paul. “The Stylus Phantasticus and Free Keyboard Music of the North German Baroque.” Google Books. Routledge, July 5, 2017. https://books.google.com/books/about/The_Stylus_Phantasticus_and_Free_Keyboar.html?id=HCwxDwAAQBAJ.
- Mattheson, Johann, and Margarete Reimann. Der Vollkommene Capellmeister, 1739. Bärenreiter-Verlag, 1954.
- Terence, Charlston. “Now Swift, Now Hesitating: The Stylus Phantasticus and the Art of Fantasy.” Musica antiqua, 2012, 30–35.
- Heller, Wendy. Music in the Baroque. New York: W.W. Norton, 2014.
- Snyder, Kerala J. "Buxtehude, Dieterich." Grove Music Online. 2001; Accessed 13 Sep. 2022. https://www.oxfordmusiconline.com/grovemusic/view/10.1093/gmo/9781561592630.001.0001/omo-9781561592630-e-0000004477.
- Dirksen, Pieter. "The Enigma of the stylus phantasticus and Dieterich Buxtehude's Praeludium in G Minor (BuxWV 163)." Orphei Organi Antiqui: Essays in Honor of Harald Vogel, ed. Cleveland Johnson, Seattle: Westfield Center, 2006, 107–132.

== Historical sources ==
- Musurgia universalis by Athanasius Kircher; page 585 (Max Planck Institut für Wissenschaftsgeschichte)
- Musurgia universalis by Athanasius Kircher; page 585 (University of Strasbourg - alt)
- Early Chamber Music by Ruth Halle Rowen; page 10
