= Toccatas for Keyboard (Bach) =

Collection of musical works for keyboard written by Johann Sebastian Bach

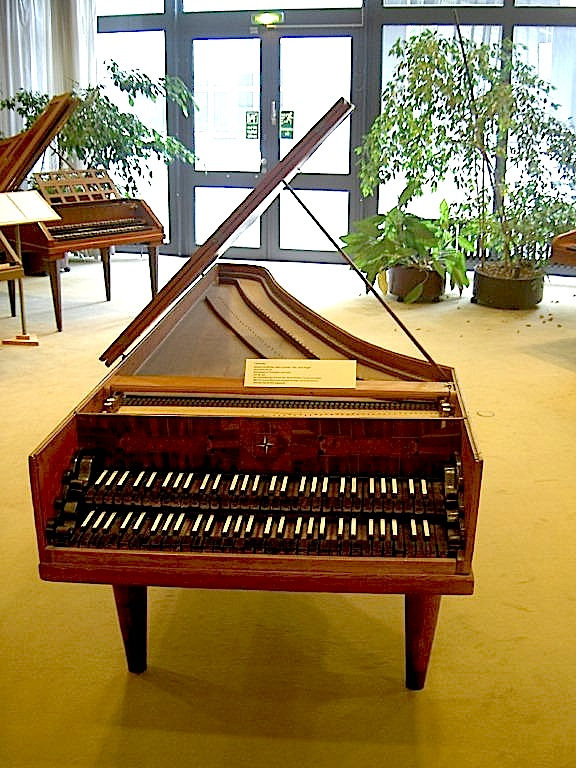
The Bach Harpsichord in the Berlin Musical Instrument Museum

The Toccatas for Keyboard, BWV 910–916, are seven pieces for clavier written by Johann Sebastian Bach. Although the pieces were not originally organized into a collection by Bach himself (as were most of his other keyboard works, such as The Well-Tempered Clavier and the English Suites), the pieces share many similarities, and are frequently grouped and performed together under a collective title.

== History ==
The toccatas represent Bach's earliest keyboard compositions known under a collective title. The earliest sources of the BWV 910, 911 and 916 toccatas appear in the Andreas-Bach Book, an important collection of keyboard and organ manuscripts of various composers compiled by Bach's oldest brother, Johann Christoph Bach between 1707 and 1713. An early version of the BWV 912 (known as the BWV 912a) also exists in another collection compiled by Johann Christoph Bach known as the "Möller manuscript", from around 1703 to 1707. This indicates that most of these works originated no later than Bach's early Weimar years, though the early northern-German style indicates possible Arnstadt origin.

== Composition ==
Toccata in D major, BWV 912
Performed on a piano by Randolph Hokanson

The works bear an early northern-German influence, with distinct contrasting sections and fugal passages ingrained into the rhapsodic material, as opposed to the more familiar, two-movement prelude and fugue format. Other early Bach works that follow this sectional, Buxtehude-influenced format include the Prelude (Toccata) and Fugue in E major, BWV 566, and Prelude and Fugue in A minor, BWV 551.

Though the specific instrumentation is not given for any of the works, they are all strictly manualiter, as none of them call for pedal parts. Like Bach's other clavier works, these toccatas are frequently performed on the piano. Because of some of the organ-like textures, the pieces are sometimes performed on the organ. In fact, the opening motifs of the BWV 912, 914 and 916 toccatas resemble the ones on the BWV 532, 534 and 541 organ preludes respectively.

=== The toccatas ===
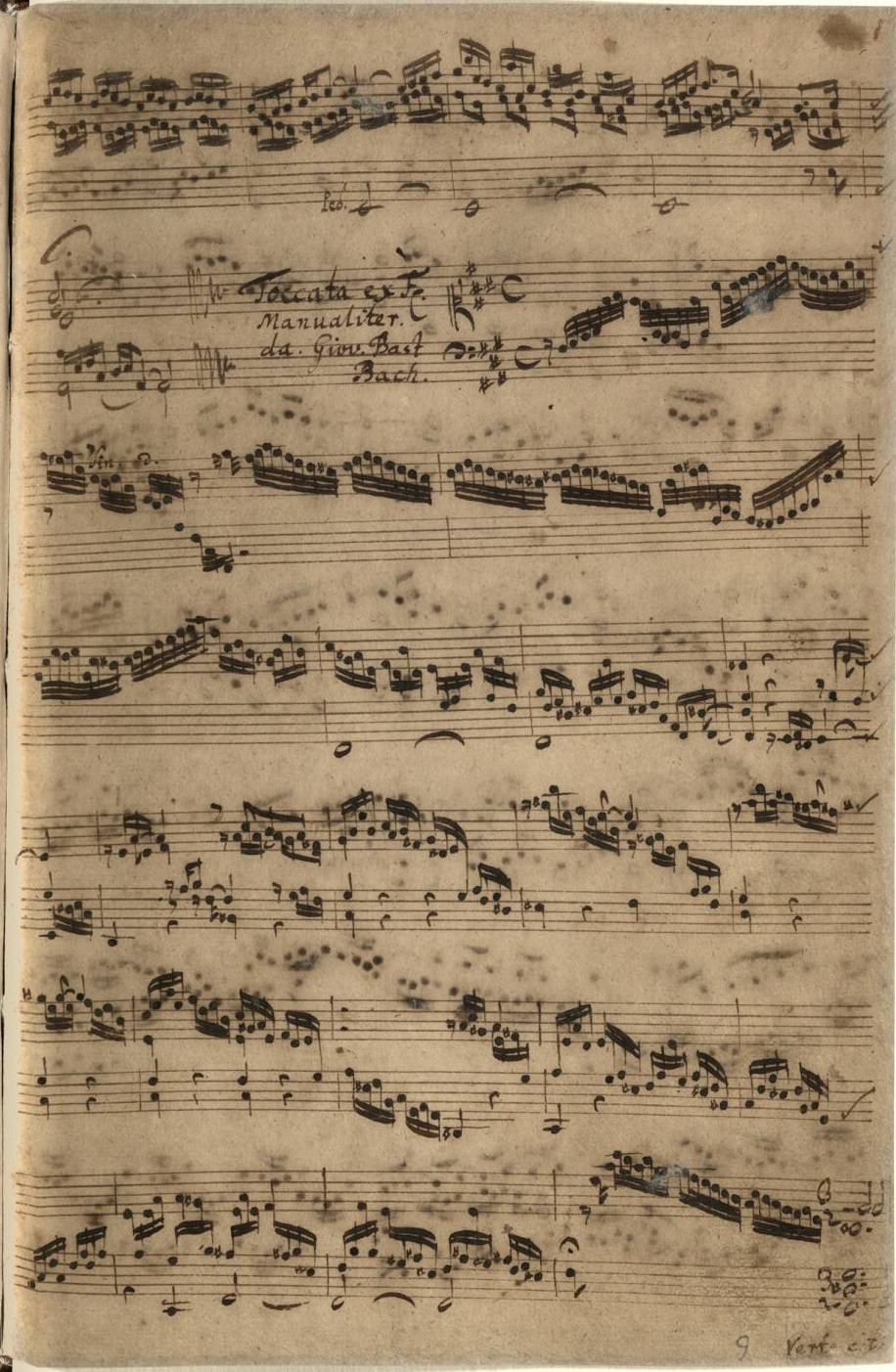
Beginning of the BWV 910 F♯ minor Toccata – from the Andreas Bach Book, in the hand of Johann Christoph Bach

Toccata in F♯ minor, BWV 910

1. (Toccata)
2. [no tempo indication]
3. Presto e Staccato (Fuga)
4. [no tempo indication]
5. (Fuga)

Toccata in C minor, BWV 911

1. (Toccata)
2. Adagio
3. (Fuga)
4. Adagio
5. (Fuga)
6. Adagio / Presto

Toccata in D major, BWV 912

1. Presto
2. Allegro
3. Adagio
4. [no tempo indication]
5. Con Discrezione
6. Fuga

Toccata in D minor, BWV 913

1. (Toccata)
2. [no tempo indication]
3. Presto
4. Adagio
5. Allegro

Toccata in E minor, BWV 914

1. (Toccata)
2. Un Poco Allegro (a 4 voci.)
3. Adagio
4. Allegro – Fuga (a 3 voci.)

Toccata in G minor, BWV 915

1. (Toccata)
2. Adagio
3. Allegro
4. Adagio
5. Fuga

Toccata in G major, BWV 916

1. Presto
2. Adagio
3. Allegro (Fuga)
