= James Kibbie =

American organist and pedagogue

James Kibbie (born March 13, 1949) is an American concert organist, recording artist and pedagogue.

== Biography ==
Kibbie was born in 1949 in Vinton, Iowa, USA. He graduated from Davenport West High School in 1967. He holds the Bachelor of Music in Organ Performance from North Texas State University (Magna cum laude, 1971), the Master of Music in Organ Performance from North Texas State University (1972), and the Doctor of Musical Arts in Organ Performance from the University of Michigan (1981). He won the International Organ Competition of the Prague Spring Festival in the former Czechoslovakia in 1979 and the Grand Prix d'Intérpretation at the International Organ Competition "Grand Prix de Chartres" in France in 1980. He is professor emeritus of Organ at the University of Michigan, where his 42-year tenure included service as University Organist and Chair of the Organ Department. The University of Michigan has endowed the James Kibbie Scholarship in perpetuity to support students majoring in organ and sacred music.

== Performing career ==
Kibbie has presented recitals, masterclasses and workshops throughout North America and Europe, including appearances at the Cathedral of Notre Dame in Paris, Royal Festival Hall in London, Dvořák Hall in the Rudolfinum in Prague and Lincoln Center for the Performing Arts in New York. His performances have been broadcast on radio and television in the US, Canada and Europe. His recordings have been issued on a variety of labels in North American and Europe (see Discography). Since 2002 he has released annual holiday recordings on the seven-stop Létourneau mechanical-action organ in his home.

== Complete organ works of J.S. Bach ==
Kibbie performed the complete organ works of Johann Sebastian Bach in a series of 18 recitals at the University of Michigan in 2000 and again in 2022–23. From 2007 to 2009 he recorded the complete works on seven historic baroque organs in Germany built by Gottfried Silbermann, Arp Schnitger and Behrendt Huß, Tobias Heinrich Gottfried Trost, Erasmus Bielfeldt, and Zacharias Hildebrandt, with the addition of four more recently authenticated Bach works recorded in 2016. With support from Dr. Barbara Furin Sloat, the University of Michigan maintains a website providing free downloads of the recordings in MP3, AAC and full uncompressed audio formats.

== Organ performance and data science ==
James Kibbie and Daniel Forger, Professor of Mathematics and Computational Medicine and Bioinformatics at the University of Michigan, led a research team investigating how data science can be employed to analyze and understand issues of musical performance. Doctoral students Sarah Simko (Organ Performance) and Caleb Mayer (Mathematics) served as research assistants for the project. The first phase, funded by a grant from the Michigan Institute for Data Science (MIDAS), developed a library of digitized performances of Johann Sebastian Bach's Trio Sonatas for organ by University of Michigan faculty and students on a variety of pipe organs. The research team then developed and applied data science algorithms to analyze performance-related issues, including comparing different performances to determine features that make performances artistic, as well as the common mistakes performers make. The digitized performances will be shared with other researchers with the goal of enabling research and pedagogy in disciplines including data science, music performance, mathematics and music psychology. Other elements of the project included seminars taught by Kibbie and Forger, a study tour for University of Michigan students to historic organs in the Netherlands and Germany, and the university's 59th Annual Organ Conference, "Building Bach: His Foundations and Futures."

== Discography ==
- James Kibbie – Bach Organ Works, free downloads of the complete organ works of Johann Sebastian Bach recorded on seven historic baroque organs in Germany: Block M Records, 2007–2009.
- The Annual Holiday Recordings, recorded by James Kibbie on his residence organ and issued as audio "holiday cards"
  - 2025: Brenda Portman, "Variations on Patapan"
  - 2024: Robin Milford, "Pastoral Dance on 'On Christmas Night'"
  - 2023: Karl Osterland, "Pastorale"
  - 2022: Robin Milford, "Cradle Song for Christmas Day"
  - 2021: Karl Osterland, "Personent hodie"
  - 2020: Florence Price, "Retrospection (An Elf on a Moonbeam)"
  - 2019: Joe Utterback, "Song of the Magi"
  - 2018: Carson Cooman, "Variations on a Basque Noël (Beude bazter), Op. 1212"
  - 2017: Ernst Pepping, Three Preludes on "Vom Himmel hoch, da komm ich her"
  - 2016: Alexis Chauvet, "Noël: Or dites-nous Marie"
  - 2015: Hugo Distler, Variations on "Frisch auf, gut Gsell, laß rummer gahn"
  - 2014: Ernst Pepping, "Vom Himmel hoch, da komm ich her"
  - 2013: Jan Koetsier, "Partita on 'Wachet auf, ruft uns die Stimme', Op. 41/3," with David Jackson, trombone
  - 2012: Joseph W. Clokey, "Pastorale"
  - 2011: Jiří Ropek, "Fantasy on Mozart's Theme"
  - 2010: Charles-Marie Widor, "March of the Night Watchman" from Bach's Memento
  - 2009: Jehan Alain, "Adagio"
  - 2008: Ernst Pepping, "Wie soll ich dich empfangen, Vorspiel II"
  - 2007: Ernst Pepping, "Wie soll ich dich empfangen, Vorspiel I"
  - 2006: Jan Koetsier, "Partita for English Horn and Organ Manuals, Op. 41, No. 1," with Sally Pituch, English horn
  - 2005: Johann Sebastian Bach, "Jesus, meine Zuversicht," BWV 728
  - 2004: Jehan Alain, "Deuxième Prélude"
  - 2003: Larry Visser, "Noël on Silent Night"
  - 2002: Hugo Distler, "Variations on Wo Gott zu Haus nit gibt sein Gunst"
- Nigerian Prayer: Oba a ba ke by Fela Sowande, video recording from 2017 concert at the Basilica of St. James, Prague, on 25 Years of the International Organ Festival, St. James Audite Organum, DVD, 2020
- Herr Christ, der einig Gottes Sohn, BWV Anh. 75 by J.S. Bach, recorded on the 1717 Trost organ in Großengottern, Germany, on Bach 333, Deutsche Grammophon, CD, 2018
- Audite Organum, with John Scott, Susan Landale, Mari Ohki, Liene Andreta Kalnciema, Thierry Escaich and Irena Chřibková, recorded live at the Basilica of St. James, Prague, CD, Radioservis, 2015
- Concert Variations on the Star-Spangled Banner by Dudley Buck, recorded on the Frieze Memorial Organ in Hill Auditorium, the University of Michigan, on Poets & Patriots, CD, Star Spangled Music Foundation, 2014
- Jiří Ropek: Credo, with Jiří Ropek, Jan Kalfus, the Czech Radio Chamber Choir and the Bohemia Brass Ensemble, CD, Supraphon Records, 2001
- Organ and Choral Music: Theodore Morrison, with Scott Hanoian, Karl Schrock, Marilyn Mason and the University of Michigan Chamber Choir, CD, Equilibrium Records, 2001
- "Nigerian Prayer" by Fela Sowande on Historic Organs of Michigan, CD, The Organ Historical Society, 1998
- Merrily on Hill, Christmas Organ Music from Hill Auditorium, CD, Prestant Records, 1997
- Jiří Ropek, Composer and Organist, with John Scott, Jan Kalfus, Pavel Cerny and the Prague Philharmonic Chorus, CD, Multisonic Records, 1994
- Johann Sebastian Bach, Clavierübung III, recorded at the Cathedral of St. Catharine's, Ontario, Canada, 2-CD set, Afka Records, 1993
- Choral I by César Franck, recording accompanying The Game of Great Composers, cassette, Aristoplay, Ltd., 1988
- Organ Works of Dieterich Buxtehude, recorded on the 1687 Arp Schnitger organ of Norden, Germany, CD, Arkay Records, 1987
- 20th-Century Czech Organ Music, recorded at Trinity Cathedral, Trenton, New Jersey, cassette, Spectrum Records, 1985
- Jehan Alain: an Organ Anthology, recorded at Chartres Cathedral, France, LP, Spectrum Records, 1984
- Works of Charles Tournemire, recorded at Trinity Cathedral, Trenton, New Jersey, LP and cassette, Spectrum Records, 1983
- The World Rejoices, with the Gregg Smith Singers, LP, Vox-Turnabout Records, 1977
- Unicorn, with the Texas Boys Choir, LP, Vox Records, 1977
- Works of Mozart and Goemanne, with the Texas Boys Choir, LP, 1974
