= Toccata =

Type of virtuoso instrumental musical composition

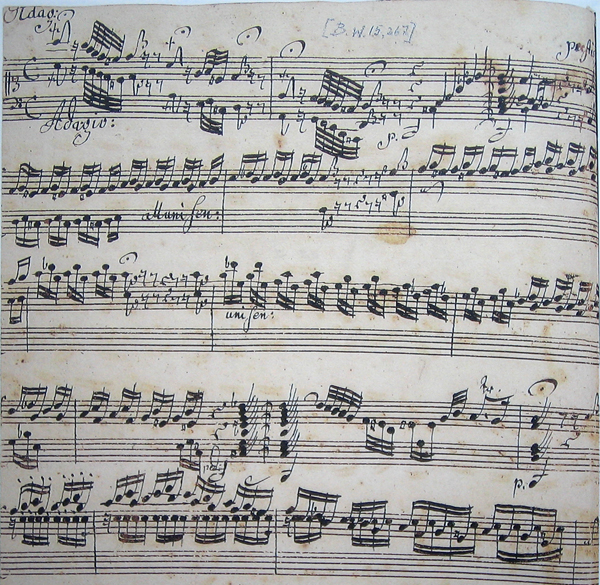
The first page of J. S. Bach's Toccata and Fugue in D minor, BWV 565

Toccata (from Italian toccare, literally, "to touch", with "toccata" being the action of touching) is a virtuoso piece of music typically for a keyboard or plucked string instrument featuring fast-moving, lightly fingered or otherwise virtuosic passages or sections, with or without imitative or fugal interludes, generally emphasizing the dexterity of the performer's fingers. Less frequently, the name is applied to works for multiple instruments (the opening of Claudio Monteverdi's opera L'Orfeo being a notable example).

== History ==
=== Renaissance ===
Little is known about the origin of the toccata other than that it was likely adapted from music for festive functions that was written for trumpet and timpani and latter transcribed for the organ or other keyboard instruments. The form first appeared in the late Renaissance in northern Italy. Several publications of the 1590s include toccatas, by composers such as Claudio Merulo, Andrea and Giovanni Gabrieli, Adriano Banchieri, and Luzzasco Luzzaschi. These are keyboard compositions in which one hand, and then the other, performs virtuosic runs and brilliant cascading passages against a chordal accompaniment in the other hand. Among the composers working in Venice at this time was the young Hans Leo Hassler, who studied with the Gabrielis; he brought the form back with him to Germany. It was in Germany where it underwent its highest development, culminating in the work of Johann Sebastian Bach more than a hundred years later.

=== Baroque ===
Toccata and Fugue in D Minor, BWV 565
Composed by Johann Sebastian Bach, MIDI rendition uploaded by Ashtar Moïra

Toccata in D major, BWV 912
Composed by Johann Sebastian Bach, performed on a piano by Randolph Hokanson

Toccata in E minor
Composed by Johann Pachelbel, performed on a church organ in Trubschachen, Switzerland by Burghard Fischer

Toccata in F major
Composed by Johann Pachelbel, performed on a church organ in Trubschachen, Switzerland by Burghard Fischer

Toccata
Composed by Girolamo Frescobaldi, performed by Sylvia Kind on a harpsichord of the type used by Wanda Landowska

Toccata
Composed by Alessandro Scarlatti, performed by Sylvia Kind on a harpsichord of the type used by Wanda Landowska

The Baroque toccata, beginning with Girolamo Frescobaldi, is more sectional and increased in length, intensity and virtuosity from the Renaissance version, reaching heights of extravagance equivalent to the overwhelming detail seen in the architecture of the period. It often featured rapid runs and arpeggios alternating with chordal or fugal parts. Sometimes there was a lack of regular tempo and almost always an improvisational feel.

Other Baroque composers of toccatas, in the period before Bach, include Johann Pachelbel, Michelangelo Rossi, Johann Jakob Froberger, Jan Pieterszoon Sweelinck, Alessandro Scarlatti, and Dieterich Buxtehude.

Bach's toccatas are among the most famous examples of the form, and his Toccata and Fugue in D minor, BWV 565 is one of the most popular organ works today, although its authorship is disputed by some authorities. His toccatas for organ are improvisatory compositions, and are often followed by an independent fugue movement. In such cases, the toccata is used in place of the usually more stable prelude. Bach's toccatas for harpsichord BWV 910-916 are multi-sectional works which include fugal writing, rhetorical flourishes, recitative, and aria-like movements as part of their structure.

=== After the Baroque ===
Beyond the Baroque period, toccatas are found less frequently. There are a few notable examples, however. From the Romantic period, Robert Schumann and Franz Liszt each wrote a piano toccata. Schumann's ambitious Toccata in C major is considered one of the most technically difficult works in the repertoire and the foremost representative of the genre in the 1800s. The Liszt toccata is a very short and austere composition from his late period, and is practically a toccata only by name. Smaller-scale toccatas are sometimes called "toccatina": Liszt's contemporary and well-known virtuoso in his day Charles-Valentin Alkan composed a brief toccatina as his last published work (Op. 75).

From the early 20th century, Prokofiev and Aram Khachaturian each wrote a toccata for solo piano, as did French composers Maurice Ravel as part of Le Tombeau de Couperin, Jules Massenet, Claude Debussy in his suite Pour le piano and also "Jardins sous la pluie" (which is a toccata but not in name), Pierre Sancan and York Bowen's Toccata Op. 155. Kaikhosru Shapurji Sorabji wrote four toccatas for solo piano, while Moises Moleiro wrote two. George Enescu's Piano Suite No. 2, Op. 10, opens with a toccata. The first piece, "Sévère réprimande" (Severe Reprimand), of Erik Satie's 1912 composition Veritables Preludes flasques (pour un chien) is a toccata. The British composer Peter Seabourne reverted to the earlier multi-sectional manner of Bach in his piano cycle called Steps Volume 6: Toccatas and Fantasias, his six examples being designed to be interpolated between the seven Bach toccatas for harpsichord BWV 910-916. The same composer's earlier cycle Steps Volume 1: An anthology includes a toccata movement called A Touch, with reference to the Italian verb toccare.

The toccata form was of great importance in the French romantic organ school, something of which Jacques-Nicolas Lemmens laid the foundation with his Fanfare. Toccatas of this style became vastly different from their predecessors. While early toccatas where improvisatory, French toccatas became more strictly metered.While the playing style changed, the Toccata continued to become more virtuosic. Toccatas in this style usually consist of rapid chord progressions combined with a powerful tune (often played in the pedal).The most famous examples are the ending movement of Charles-Marie Widor's Symphony No. 5, and the Finale of Louis Vierne's Symphony No. 1.

Toccatas occasionally make appearances in works for full orchestra; a notable example is the final movement of the Eighth Symphony of Ralph Vaughan Williams. It could be said that the finales of Francis Poulenc's Concerto for Two Pianos and Orchestra and Maurice Ravel's Piano Concerto are toccatas in all but name. The first movements of Benjamin Britten's Piano Concerto and Nikolai Medtner's 2nd piano concerto are toccatas. The final movement of John Adams' Violin Concerto is entitled "Toccare," again referring to the origins of the word toccata; and the first movement (Schnelle halbe) of Paul Hindemith's fifth Kammermusik (a viola concerto) is written as a toccata. Also the Swiss composer Dieter Ammann has written a piano concerto with the title "Gran Toccata", in reference to its forward motion. Another contemporary composer who has written many toccatas is Emma Lou Diemer. In addition to several toccatas for organ, she has written three for piano (that of 1979 is frequently played), one for flute chorus, one for violin and piano, one for solo timpani and one for six mallet percussion. Both the finales of Samuel Barber's violin concerto and piano concerto can be described as toccatas. The Argentinian composer Alberto Ginastera often utilizes toccatas or toccata-like forms as the finales of his works; notably in the Harp Concerto, Piano Concerto No.1, Violin Concerto, Guitar Sonata, and his Piano Sonatas. Russian jazz composer Nikolai Kapustin composed two toccatinas: one as part of his Eight Concert Etudes, Op. 40 and another, Opus 36. Evgeny Kissin wrote a jazz-inspired toccata as part of his Four Piano Pieces, Op. 1.

== Literature ==
Robert Browning used the motif or concept of a toccata by Baldassare Galuppi to evoke thoughts of human transience in his poem "A Toccata of Galuppi's" (although Galuppi did not actually write any piece with the name 'Toccata').
