= Dietrich Kilian =

German musicologist (1928–1984)

- Born: 3 May 1928; Roßlau, Saxony-Anhalt, Germany
- Died: 6 September 1984 (aged 56)
- Education: Free University of Berlin (PhD)
- Occupation: Musicologist
- Years active: 1950s–1980s
- Style: Baroque classical

Dietrich Kilian (3 May 1928 – 6 September 1984) was a German musicologist and scholar of the works of Bach and Buxtehude.

== Career ==
Kilian was born in Roßlau. He studied at the Free University of Berlin and earned a doctorate in 1956 with the thesis Das Vokalwerk D. Buxtehudes – Quellenstudien zu seiner Überlieferung und Verwendung (The Vocal Works by D. Buxtehude – Study of the Sources Regarding Tradition and Use). From 1958, he was an editor of the New Bach Edition, the critical edition of the complete works by Johann Sebastian Bach. Working from the Johann Sebastian Bach Institute in Göttingen, he edited and wrote critical reports for the rest of his life on the cantatas (I/13), the orchestral works (VII/3) and the organ works (IV/5–7). With Alfred Dürr, Klaus Hofmann and others, he authored Kritischer Bericht (Critical Commentary).

He rediscovered and published in 1963 the Prelude in C major by Buxtehude (BuxWV 138).

== Selected works ==
- Neue Ausgabe sämtlicher Werke: Serie 1, Kantaten. Bd. 13. Kantaten zum 1. Pfingsttag. Kritischer Bericht, Deutscher Verlag für Musik, 1960
- Neue Ausgabe sämtlicher Werke. Serie I, Kantaten: Kantaten zum 20. und 21. Sonntag nach Trinitatis : kritischer Bericht, Band 25, Verlag Bärenreiter, 1997
- Präludien, Toccaten, Fantasien und Fugen für Orgel: kritischer Bericht, Teil 1, Verlag Bärenreiter, 1978
- Das Vokalwerk Dietrich Buxtehudes: Quellenstudien zu seiner Überlieferung und Verwendung, Verlag Berlin., 1956
- Neun Kantaten für vier Singstimmen und Instrumente, Band 8 von Dietrich Buxtehudes Werke, illustrierte Neuauflage, Verlag Broude International Editions, 1978

== Literature ==
- Reinmar Emans: Die Neue Bach-Ausgabe. In: Jochaim Lüdtke (ed.), Bach und die Nachwelt, vol. 4 (1950-2000), Laaber-Verlag, 2005, p. 289–303, p. 297ff., ISBN 3-89007-326-3
