= Tucker (surname) =

Origin
- Origin: Old English, Old Saxon, Gaeilge
- Meaning: derived from various Germanic verbs meaning "to torment"
- Region of origin: England, Germany, Ireland

Other names
- Variant forms: Tukker, Toher

Tucker is a surname of disputed origin.

== Possible derivation of the name ==
The origin of the name is not entirely certain, but since it has a long history as a surname on the continent, as in England and from thereon, also in the United States, it presumably has the same Saxon roots.

=== In England ===
Recorded as both Tucker and Tooker, the derivation of the English occupational surname comes from the Old English, pre-7th century verb tucian, meaning "to torment". It would have been for a fuller, also known as a "walker", one who softened freshly woven cloth by beating and tramping on it in stale urine. "Tucker" was the usual term in the southwest of England (and South Wales as well), "walker" in the west and north, and "fuller" in the southeast and East Anglia.

The first recorded spelling of the family name is shown to be that of one Baldwin Tuckere in the 1236 Records of Battle Abbey in Sussex. Nevertheless, one should not be too hasty to assign English origin to bearers of the surname.

=== German and Dutch origins ===
Linguistically, the word tucker is assumed to be related to the German Tucher, which means "cloth-maker". In the 15th century, the bulk of the German cotton trade was in the hands of the Tucher von Simmelsdorf family in Nürnberg, where Tucher Castle still stands.

In Old Dutch, which is closely related to Old German, the word tuch was often used as a verb to mean "to tug sharply" (see above). The similar linguistic origin of these words is also recognizable in the English etymology.

In the Netherlands the earliest known Tuckers are the brothers Jan and Willam die Tucker, both vassals of the Lord of Culemborg in 1358 who was parented to the Lord of Breda where Jan Tucker sold a house in 1368 on the Hagedijk Road to Antwerp in the city of Breda. Breda held a local monopoly on the wool trade in those days. Over the centuries the Dutch form of the surname has been spelled both Tucker and Tukker.

=== Possible Irish origin ===
Tucker can also be an Anglicized form of the Irish surname O'Tuachair, which first appeared in the Annals of Ulster in 1126 AD as Uá Tuathchair. It is not uncommon to see Anglicized representations of Irish surnames, and myriad examples may be cited. According to Patrick Woulfe, in his book Irish Names and Surnames it is the name of two distinct septs; one from the Irish Midlands region known as Ely-O'Carroll (which includes parts of County Tipperary and County Offaly), and another from County Mayo. These findings were confirmed by the first Chief Herald of Ireland, Edward MacLysaght, and published in his book More Irish Families.

Variants of the Irish surname include Toher, Togher, and Tougher.

== People with the surname "Tucker" include ==
=== A ===
- Aaron Tucker (born 1981), Canadian writer
- Abi Tucker (born 1973), Australian singer-songwriter
- Abraham Tucker (1705–1774), English philosopher
- Adele Tucker (1868–1971), Bermudian schoolteacher
- Adrian Tucker (born 1976), Welsh footballer
- Adrian Tucker (cricketer) (born 1969), Australian cricketer
- Al Tucker (1943–2001), American basketball player
- Alando Tucker (born 1984), American basketball player
- Albert Tucker (disambiguation), multiple people
- Alexander Tucker (disambiguation), multiple people
- Alfred Tucker (1849–1914), Equatorial Guinean bishop
- Allen Tucker (1866–1939), American artist
- Allen Tucker (Medal of Honor) (1838–1903), American soldier
- Amy Tucker (disambiguation), multiple people
- Anand Tucker (born 1963), Thai-British filmmaker
- Andre Tucker, American football trainer
- Andrew Tucker (disambiguation), multiple people
- Angela Tucker, American writer
- Anna Tucker (1920–2012), American civil servant
- Anne Wilkes Tucker, American museum curator
- Annette Tucker, American songwriter
- Anthony Tucker (disambiguation), multiple people
- Archibald Tucker (1904–1980), South African linguist
- Arnold Tucker (1924–2019), American football player
- Art Tucker (born 1959), American boxer
- Avis Tucker (1915–2010), American journalist

=== B ===
- Barbara Tucker (disambiguation), multiple people
- Barry Tucker (born 1952), Welsh footballer
- Beatrice Edna Tucker (1897/1898–1984), American obstetrician
- Ben Tucker (1930–2013), American bassist
- Benjamin Tucker (disambiguation), multiple people
- Bernard Tucker (1901–1950), English ornithologist
- Bert Tucker (1944–2014), Belizean politician
- Bessie Tucker (1906–1933), American singer-songwriter
- Beverley D. Tucker (1846–1930), American bishop
- Bill Tucker (disambiguation), multiple people
- Billy Tucker (born 1948), English footballer
- B. J. Tucker (born 1980), American football player
- Bobby Tucker (1923–2007), American pianist
- Buddy Tucker, American minister
- Brad Tucker (born 1992), New Zealand rugby union footballer
- Brett Tucker (born 1972), Australian actor
- Brett Tucker (cricketer) (born 1979), South African cricketer
- Brian Tucker (disambiguation), multiple people
- Brooks Tucker, American government official
- Bryan Tucker, American comedian

=== C ===
- Carole Tucker, British professor
- Casey Tucker (born 1995), American football player
- Catherine Tucker (born 1977), American professor
- C. Delores Tucker (1927–2005), American politician and activist
- Cécile Tucker (born 1969), American rower
- Charles Tucker (disambiguation), multiple people
- Charlotte Maria Tucker (1821–1893), English writer
- Cheyna Tucker (born 1990), South African squash player
- Chris Tucker (born 1972), American actor
- Christopher Tucker (1946–2022), British make-up artist
- Clarke Tucker (born 1981), American politician
- Clay Tucker (born 1980), American basketball player
- Clayton Tucker (born 1991), American politician
- Cleopatra Tucker (born 1943), American politician
- Cliff Tucker (1989–2018), American basketball player
- Clifton Tucker (1888–1973), Australian rules footballer
- Cole Tucker (born 1996), American baseball player
- Cole Tucker (actor) (1953–2015), American actor
- Colm Tucker (1952–2012), Irish rugby union footballer
- Compton Tucker, American Earth scientist and academic
- Corin Tucker (born 1972), American singer and guitarist
- Curtis R. Tucker (1918–1988), American politician
- Cynthia Tucker (journalist) (born 1955), American columnist
- Cynthia Tucker (politician) (born 1954), Canadian politician
- Cyril Tucker (1911–1992), English bishop

=== D ===
- Dakarai Tucker (born 1994), American basketball player
- Dalton Tucker (born 2000), American football player
- Daniel Tucker (disambiguation), multiple people
- Dar Tucker (born 1988), American-Jordanian basketball player
- Dara Tucker, American singer-songwriter
- Darcy Tucker (born 1975), Canadian hockey player
- Darcy Tucker (footballer) (born 1997), Australian rules footballer
- Darren Tucker (born 1962), Australian cricketer
- David Tucker (disambiguation), multiple people
- Deborah Tucker, American actress
- Deborah Tucker, American activist
- Delmi Tucker (born 1997), South African cricketer
- Demetria Tucker, American librarian
- Dexter Tucker (born 1979), English footballer
- Donald Tucker (disambiguation), multiple people
- Dudley Gilman Tucker (1887–1918), American soldier
- Duke Tucker (born 1970), Wisconsin politician
- Duncan Tucker, American filmmaker

=== E ===
- Earl Snakehips Tucker (1905–1937), American dancer
- Ebenezer Tucker (1758–1845), American judge and legislator
- Eddie Tucker (born 1966), American baseball player
- Eddie Tucker (footballer) (born 1932), Australian rules footballer
- Edward Tucker (??–1739), British merchant and politician
- Elena J. Tucker, Australian geneticist
- E. M. Tucker, American architect
- Emma Tucker (born 1966/1967), English journalist
- Emmanuel Tucker, Sierra Leonean bishop
- Eric Tucker (1932–2018), English painter
- Eric James Tucker (1927–1957), Indian army officer
- Ernest Tucker (1931–2019), Canadian author, educator, and journalist
- Ethan Tucker, American rabbi
- Ethelyn Maria Tucker (1871–1959), American botanist
- Eugene A. Tucker (1856–1942), American attorney and politician
- Evelyn Tucker (1906–1996), American war hero

=== F ===
- Forrest Tucker (1919–1986), American actor
- Forrest Tucker (criminal) (1920–2004), American criminal
- Francis Tucker (1923–2008), South African racing driver
- Francis Bland Tucker (1895–1984), American priest
- Frank T. Tucker (1864–1910), American politician
- Fred C. Tucker (1918–1994), American businessman

=== G ===
- Gardiner L. Tucker, American scientist
- Gee Tucker (born 1946), American actor
- George Tucker (disambiguation), multiple people
- Gerald Tucker (1922–1979), American basketball coach
- Gerard Tucker (1885–1974), Australian priest
- Gideon J. Tucker (1826–1899), American lawyer and politician
- Gil Tucker (born 1947), Australian actor
- Glyn Tucker (born 1943), New Zealand musician
- Gordon Tucker, American rabbi
- Gordon Tucker (footballer) (born 1968), English footballer
- Gregory Tucker (born 1957), American politician
- Gene Tucker, Iconic Australian

=== H ===
- Harold Tucker (1930–2015), English politician
- Harold Logie Tucker (born 1968), Sierra Leonean politician
- Hazel Tucker (born 1965), New Zealand anthropologist
- Helen F. Tucker (1902–1986), American biochemist
- Henry Tucker (disambiguation), multiple people
- Herman Tucker (1928–2001), American truck driver
- H. G. Tucker (1879–1936), American politician
- Holly Tucker (born 1977), British entrepreneur
- Holly Tucker (musician) (born 1992), American singer-songwriter
- Howard Tucker (1922–2025), American neurologist
- Hugh Tucker (1537–1586), English politician
- Hugh Tucker (drag racer), American racing driver

=== I ===
- Irene Tucker, American philosopher

=== J ===
- Jack Tucker (born 1999), English footballer
- Jacob R. Tucker (1845–1926), American soldier
- Jalie Tucker (born 1954), American professor
- James Tucker (disambiguation), multiple people
- Jane Tucker (born 1949), British actress
- Janeiro Tucker (born 1975), Bermudan cricketer
- Janine Tucker, American lacrosse coach
- Jason Tucker (born 1976), American football player
- Jason Tucker (footballer) (born 1973), English footballer
- J. E. Tucker (1833–1910), American politician
- Jeff Tucker (luger) (born 1956), American luger
- Jeffrey Tucker (born 1963), American writer and publisher
- Jennifer Tucker, American professor
- Jerry Tucker (disambiguation), multiple people
- Jim Tucker (disambiguation), multiple people
- Jimmy Tucker (born 1970), English rugby union footballer
- Jon Tucker (born 1982), Pipeline Controller and Back-up Specialist
- John Tucker (disambiguation), multiple people
- Jonathan Tucker (born 1982), American actor
- Jonathan B. Tucker (1954–2011), American chemical weapons expert
- Joseph Tucker (disambiguation), multiple people
- Joshua Tucker (??–1690), English archdeacon
- Josiah Tucker (1713–1799), Welsh priest
- J. R. Tucker (1946–2014), American physicist
- J. Randolph Tucker Jr. (1914–2015), American attorney and politician
- Judith Tucker (born 1960), Welsh artist
- Judith E. Tucker (born 1947), American professor
- Junior Tucker (born 1966), Jamaican musician
- Justin Tucker (born 1989), American football player
- Jyles Tucker (born 1983), American football player

=== K ===
- K.A. Tucker, Canadian novelist
- Kane Tucker (born 2000), Irish boxer
- Karla Faye Tucker (1959–1998), American murderer
- Kathryn Tucker (born 1959), American attorney
- Kathryn Tucker (producer), American film producer
- Ken Tucker, American media critic
- Ken Tucker (footballer) (1925–2008), English footballer
- Kenrick Tucker (born 1959), Australian cyclist
- Kerrie Tucker (born 1948), Australian politician and activist
- Kevin Tucker (disambiguation), multiple people
- Kinder Tucker (1875–1939), New Zealand cricketer
- Kristina Tucker (born 1980), Swedish golfer
- Kwame Tucker (born 1976), Bermudian cricketer
- Kyle Tucker (born 1997), American baseball player

=== L ===
- Lamin Tucker (born 1982), Sierra Leonean sprinter
- Larry Tucker (politician) (1935–2016), American politician
- Larry Tucker (screenwriter) (1934–2001), American television writer
- Ledyard Tucker (1910–2004), American mathematician
- Lee Tucker (disambiguation), multiple people
- Lem Tucker (1938–1991), American journalist
- Lew Tucker (born 1950), American computer scientist
- Lisa Tucker (disambiguation), multiple people
- Liz Tucker, British filmmaker
- Lorcan Tucker (born 1996), Irish cricketer
- Lorenzo Tucker (1907–1986), American actor
- Louise Tucker (born 1956), English soprano
- Luther Tucker (1936–1993), American guitarist
- Luther Tucker (publisher) (1802–1873), American publisher

=== M ===
- Malcolm Tucker (disambiguation), multiple people
- Marc Tucker (born 1939), American business executive
- Marcia Tucker (1940–2006), American art historian
- Marcus Tucker (born 1992), American football player
- Margaret Tucker (1904–1996), Australian activist
- Margaret A. Tucker, American oncologist
- Marianne Tucker (born 1937), British canoeist
- Mark Tucker (disambiguation), multiple people
- Marlon Tucker (born 1960), Jamaican cricketer
- Mary Tucker (disambiguation), multiple people
- Matthew Tucker (born 1991), American football player
- Maureen Tucker (born 1944), American musician
- Maurice Tucker (born 1946), British geologist
- Max Tucker (born 1991), Hong Kong cricketer
- Mel Tucker (born 1972), American football coach
- Michael Tucker (disambiguation), multiple people
- Mick Tucker (1947–2002), English musician
- Mickey Tucker (born 1941), American pianist
- Mike Tucker (disambiguation), multiple people
- Milton Tucker (1921–1986), Barbadian sports shooter
- Moe Tucker (born 1944), American musician
- Mother Grace Tucker (1919–2012), American pastor

=== N ===
- Nadame Tucker (born 2000), American football player
- Nancy Bernkopf Tucker (1948–2012), American diplomat
- Nathaniel Beverley Tucker (1784–1851), American author
- Nathaniel Beverley Tucker (journalist) (1820–1890), American diplomat
- Neely Tucker (born 1963), American journalist
- Neil Tucker (1915–1981), Australian rules footballer
- Nicholas Tucker, English academic
- Nick Tucker (born 1985), American stock car racing driver
- Noi Tucker (born 1960), Australian lawn bowler
- Norman Tucker (1910–1978), English musician

=== O ===
- Ollie Tucker (1902–1940), American baseball player
- Orrin Tucker (1911–2011), American musician
- Otto Tucker (1923–2015), Canadian activist

=== P ===
- Pamela Tucker (born 1963), American politician
- Patty Tucker (born 1954), American bridge player
- Paul Tucker (disambiguation), multiple people
- Perc Tucker (1919–1980), Australian politician
- Percy Tucker (1928–2021), South African author
- Peter L. Tucker (1927–2017), Sierra Leonean civil servant
- Petrese B. Tucker (born 1951), American judge
- Phil Tucker (1927–1985), American filmmaker
- P. J. Tucker (born 1985), American basketball player
- Pomeroy Tucker (1802–1870), American politician
- Preston Tucker (1903–1956), American entrepreneur
- Preston Tucker (baseball) (born 1990), American baseball player

=== R ===
- Rachel Tucker (born 1981), Northern Irish singer and actress
- Ralph Tucker (1906–1977), American politician
- Rayjon Tucker (born 1997), American basketball player
- Raymond Tucker (1896–1970), American politician
- Reuben Tucker (born 1956), Guamanian wrestler
- Reuben Henry Tucker III (1911–1970), American army officer
- Rex Tucker (1913–1996), British television director
- Rex Tucker (American football) (born 1976), American football player
- Richard Tucker (disambiguation), multiple people
- Robbie Tucker (born 2001), American actor
- Robert Tucker (disambiguation), multiple people
- Roberto Tucker (born 1983), Argentine footballer
- Rod Tucker (born 1964), Australian cricket umpire
- Roger Tucker (born 1945), British film director
- Rolando Tucker (born 1971), Cuban fencer
- Ron Tucker (1921–1986), Australian rules footballer
- Rosa Lee Tucker (1866–1946), American librarian
- Rose Tucker, Australian filmmaker
- Rosie Tucker, American musician
- Rosina Tucker (1881–1987), American labor organizer
- Ross Tucker (born 1979), American football player
- Roy A. Tucker (1951–2021), American astronomer
- Russell Tucker (born 1990), South African athlete
- Russell E. Tucker (born 1943), American politician
- Ryan Tucker (born 1975), American football player
- Ryan Tucker (baseball) (born 1986), American baseball player

=== S ===
- Sam Tucker (1895–1973), English rugby union footballer
- Samuel Tucker (disambiguation), multiple people
- Sara Tucker, American civil servant
- Sarah Tucker (disambiguation), multiple people
- Scott Tucker (disambiguation), multiple people
- Sean Tucker (disambiguation), multiple people
- Seth Brady Tucker (born 1969), American poet
- Shankar Tucker (born 1987), American musician
- Shelby Tucker (born 1935), American lawyer
- Sherrie Tucker (born 1957), American musicologist
- Shirley Cotter Tucker (born 1927), American botanist
- Shona Tucker, American actress
- Shonna Tucker, American musician
- S. J. Tucker (born 1980), American singer-songwriter
- S. Lane Tucker, American lawyer
- Sophie Tucker (1884–1966), singer and comedian
- Spencer Tucker (cricketer) (1865–1948), New Zealand cricketer
- Spencer C. Tucker (born 1937), American military historian
- Spurgeon Tucker (1894–1968), American painter
- Stanley Tucker (1931–2008), Canadian pilot
- Starling Tucker (1770–1834), American politician
- Sterling Tucker (1923–2019), American politician
- Steve Tucker (disambiguation), multiple people
- St. George Tucker (1752–1827), Bermudan-American judge
- Sultan Tucker (born 1978), Liberian athlete
- Sundray Tucker (born 1948), American singer
- Susan Tucker (disambiguation), multiple people

=== T ===
- Talen Horton-Tucker (born 2000), American basketball player
- Tamauri Tucker (born 1988), Bermudian cricketer
- Tanya Tucker (born 1958), American country musician
- Ted Tucker (born 1949), Canadian ice hockey player
- Teeny Tucker (born 1958), American singer-songwriter
- Temple Tucker (born 1936), American basketball player
- Terre Tucker (1944–1990), American model
- Therese Tucker (born 1961/1962), American businesswoman
- Thomas Tucker (disambiguation), multiple people
- Thurman Tucker (1917–1993), American baseball player
- Tilghman Tucker (1802–1859), American politician
- Timothy Tucker, American pharmacist
- T. J. Tucker (born 1978), American baseball player
- Todd Tucker (born 1979), American academic
- Todd Tucker (director), American film director
- Tom Tucker (disambiguation), multiple people
- Tony Tucker (born 1958), American boxer
- Tony Jaye Tucker Jr. (born 1989), American football player
- Torrin Tucker (born 1979), American football player
- Travis Tucker (born 1963), American football player
- Tre Tucker (born 2001), American football player
- Trent Tucker (born 1959), American basketball player
- Tuck Tucker (1961–2020), American writer
- Tudor St. George Tucker (1862–1906), English painter
- Tui St. George Tucker (1924–2004), American composer and musician
- Tyler Tucker (born 2000), Canadian ice hockey player

=== V ===
- Verran Tucker (born 1988), American football player
- Virginia Tucker (1909–1985), American mathematician

=== W ===
- Wallace Hampton Tucker, American astrophysicist
- Walter Tucker (disambiguation), multiple people
- Warwick Tucker, Australian mathematician
- Wendell Tucker (born 1943), American football player
- Whit Tucker (1940–2024), Canadian football player
- Wilburn Tucker (1920–1980), American football coach
- Will Tucker (born 1998), New Zealand rugby union footballer
- William Tucker (disambiguation), multiple people
- Willis Tucker (1922–2000), American politician
- Wilson Tucker (disambiguation), multiple people

=== Y ===
- Yvonne Edwards Tucker (born 1941), American potter and educator

== Fictional characters ==
- Cale Tucker, the main protagonist of the 2000 animated science fiction epic film Titan A.E.
- Cameron Tucker, character in the television series Modern Family
- Craig Tucker, a recurring South Park character
- Malcolm Tucker, master of spin in Armando Iannucci's The Thick of It and In the Loop
- Nina Tucker, character on the Australian soap opera television series Neighbours
- Shou Tucker and his daughter Nina, characters in the Fullmetal Alchemist manga and anime series
- Trip Tucker, character on the television series Star Trek: Enterprise

== See also ==
- Tucker (given name), people with the given name "Tucker"
- Tuck (surname), people with the surname "Tuck"
- Attorney General Tucker (disambiguation), a page for Attorneys General with the surname "Tucker"
- General Tucker (disambiguation), a page for Generals with the surname "Tucker"
- Governor Tucker (disambiguation), a page for Governors with the surname "Tucker"
- Judge Tucker (disambiguation), a page for Judges with the surname "Tucker"
- Justice Tucker (disambiguation), a page for Justices with the surname "Tucker"
- Senator Tucker (disambiguation), a page for Senators with the surname "Tucker"
