= Tukker =

Tukker may refer to:

- Sofi Tukker
- Tukker, an epithet for someone from Twente
- Tukker Princess, a cultivar of Thalictrum

== See also ==
- Tucker
- Tucker (surname)
