= Tucker =

Tucker may refer to:

== Places ==
=== United States ===
- Tucker, Arkansas
- Tucker, Georgia
- Tucker, Mississippi
- Tucker, Missouri
- Tucker, Utah, ghost town
- Tucker County, West Virginia

=== Outer space ===
- Tucker (crater), a small lunar impact crater in the southern part of the Mare Smythii

== People ==
- Tucker (given name), a page for people with the given name "Tucker"
- Tucker (surname), a page for people with the last name "Tucker"
- Tucker (American wrestler)
- Tucker (Northern Irish wrestler)

== Art, entertainment, and media ==
=== Fictional entities ===
- Tucker, a Shetland pony in the film, Racing Stripes
- Tucker's, the club in the Black Mirror episode, "San Junipero", where Yorkie and Kelly first meet

=== Film and television ===
- Tucker: The Man and His Dream, film about Preston Tucker
- Tucker (2000 TV series), a 2000–2001 American television series that aired on NBC
- Tucker (2005 TV program), a 2005–2008 American television program, previously called The Situation with Tucker Carlson, hosted by Tucker Carlson that aired on MSNBC
  - Tucker Carlson Tonight, the Fox News program formerly hosted by Tucker Carlson
- Tucker's Luck, a British television series starring Todd Carty as Tucker that aired on BBC

== Brands and enterprises ==
- Tucker 48, also nicknamed "Tucker Torpedo", a 1948 sedan automobile
- Tucker Sno-Cat, manufacturer of snowcats

== Ships ==
- USS Henry W. Tucker, name of more than one United States Navy ship
- USS Tucker, name of more than one United States Navy ship

== Other uses ==
- Tucker (dog), scat detection dog
- Tucker, a practitioner of fulling, a step in the processing of woolen cloth
- Bush tucker, Australian expression for food obtained from native plants and animals
- Tucker bag, tucker box, historically used by travelers in the Australian outback
- Tucker decomposition, mathematical decomposition for tensors
- Tuckerization, act of using a person's name in an original story as an in-joke
- Tucker Act, United States sovereign immunity statute
