= Tucket =

Tucket is a musical term often found in stage directions in Elizabethan drama. It represents:

- The English form of the Italian musical term, toccata; or more generally:
  - A fanfare or bugle call
  - A tucket is a short organ piece played at a baseball game

Then let the trumpets sound
The tucket sonance and the note to mount.

— Constable of France, in William Shakespeare, Henry V, act 4, scene 2

And there, amid the sounding of tuckets and the clash of armoured soldiery and horses continually moving forth, Dick and Joan sat side by side...

— Robert Louis Stevenson, The Black Arrow

== See also ==
- Toccata (disambiguation)
- Tuck (disambiguation)
- Tucker (disambiguation)
- Tucked
- Tucking
