= John Tucker =

John Tucker may refer to:

== Politics ==
- John Randolph Tucker (politician) (1823–1897), United States Representative from Virginia
- John Randolph Tucker (judge) (1854–1926), member of the Virginia Senate and territorial judge in Alaska, United States
- J. Randolph Tucker Jr. (1914–2015), member of the Virginia House of Delegates, United States
- John Tucker (MP) (died 1779), British MP for Weymouth and Melcombe Regis
- John Tucker (Tasmanian politician) (born 1975), Member for Lyons in the Tasmanian House of Assembly
- John B. Tucker (born 1937), American politician from New Hampshire
- John Tucker (Australian politician), (1845–1926), Member for Melbourne South in the Victorian Legislative Assembly

== Sports ==
- John Tucker (American football) (1901–1983), American football player and coach, head coach at Arkansas Tech University, 1933–1947
- John Tucker (ice hockey) (born 1964), Canadian NHL hockey player
- John Tucker (lacrosse) (fl. 1976–2015), American lacrosse player and coach

== Others ==
- John Tucker (merchant trader) (fl. 1665–1694), English slave trader for the Royal African Company from London, England
- John Tucker, president of the Philadelphia and Reading Railroad, 1844–1856
- John A. Tucker (1896–1971), American fireman and music composer
- John Bartholomew Tucker (1930–2014), American radio and television personality
- John Maurice Tucker (1916–2008), American botanist and herbarium director
- J. R. Tucker (1946–2014), American physicist
- John Randolph Tucker (naval officer) (1812–1883), officer with the US, Confederate, and Peruvian navies
- John Randolph Tucker (professor) (1879–1954), American lawyer and professor
- John V. Tucker (born 1952), British computer scientist
- John D. Tucker, American director
- John Tucker (1800–1845), victim of an 1845 lynching in Indianapolis, IN

== See also ==
- John Randolph Tucker High School, Henrico County, Virginia, United States
- John Tucker Must Die, 2006 comedy film
- Jonathan Tucker (born 1982), American film and television actor
- Jon Tucker (fl. 2000–2012), Canadian film maker and novelist
- Tucker (surname)
