= Joseph Schuster =

Joseph Schuster may refer to:

- Joseph Schuster (cellist) (1903–1969), Constantinople-born American cellist
- Joseph Schuster (composer) (1748–1812), German classical composer
- Joe Shuster (1914–1992), Canadian-born comic book writer who created Superman
- Josef Schuster (born 1954), German physician and President of the Central Council of Jews in Germany
- Joseph Schuster (vaudeville) (1896–1959), American composer, music publisher, and vaudeville and radio performer
