= J. Randolph Tucker =

J. Randolph Tucker may refer to:

- J. Randolph Tucker (politician) (1823–1897), American lawyer, author, and politician from Virginia
- J. Randolph Tucker Jr. (1914–2015), American attorney and politician from Virginia

== See also ==
- John Tucker (disambiguation)
