= General Tucker =

General Tucker may refer to:

- Charles Tucker (British Army officer) (1838–1935), British Army lieutenant general
- Charles E. Tucker Jr. (fl. 1980s–2000s), U.S. Air Force major general
- Michael S. Tucker (burn 1954), U.S. Army lieutenant general
- Reuben Henry Tucker III (1911–1970), U.S. Army major general
- William F. Tucker (1827–1881), Confederate States Army brigadier general

== See also ==
- Attorney General Tucker (disambiguation)
