= Spencer Tucker =

Spencer Tucker may refer to:

- Spencer Tucker (cricketer), New Zealand cricketer
- Spencer C. Tucker, Fulbright scholar and historian
