= Richard Tucker (American politician) =

American politician (1818–1891)

Richard Tucker (c. 1818 – August 12, 1881) was a carpenter, undertaker, and state legislator in North Carolina. He represented Craven County in the North Carolina House of Representatives in 1870 and in the North Carolina Senate in 1874 during the Reconstruction era. In 1874 he was one of four African Americans in the North Carolina Senate, all Republicans. The North Carolina House had 13 African Americans. Both bodies had strong Democratic Party majorities during the session.

He was born around 1818. He and his children were enslaved and had been owned by John D. Flanner. He helped build Flanner's Italianate home. He lived in New Bern. He worked as a carpenter and undertaker including at Greenwood Cemetery. He had a close affiliation with judge William Gaston (1778-1844).

He was part of the 1866 Freedmen Convention in Raleigh and the 1868 North Carolina Constitutional Convention. He was one of the organizers of the New Bern Education Association established January 1872. In 1873 he was certified as a justice of the peace.

He, George B. Willis and Edward R. Dudley were part of Craven County's "all black, all artisan" legislative representatives.

He married Emeline Tucker in December 1865. He owned a farm and two of his daughters became school teachers. He married Annie Smith Tucker in May 1880. He was interred at Greenwood Cemetery. He active in the Andrews Chapel.

== See also ==
- African American officeholders from the end of the Civil War until before 1900
