= Tucker (dog) =

Detection dog (2004–2026)

- Species: Dog
- Breed: Black Labrador Retriever Mix
- Sex: Male
- Born: August 15, 2004
- Died: September 2nd, 2026
- Nationality: (United States)
- Employer: Conservation Canines
- Notable role: Detection dog
- Years active: 2006 to 2017
- Weight: 75 lb (34 kg)

Tucker is a scat detection dog famous for his ability to find orca scat from the prow of a boat. A black Labrador retriever mix, he was born in August 2004, and adopted by Conservation Canines in May 2006 from SnoLine Kennels in Arlington, WA. Aside from studying resident killer whales in Washington state, he has twice been to the Alberta oil sands to survey for caribou, grey wolf, and moose, and he has located iguanas in the Caribbean.
