= Richard Tucker (disambiguation) =

Richard Tucker (1913–1975) was an American operatic tenor.

Richard Tucker may also refer to:

- Richard Tucker (c. 1786 – after 1850), Bermudian community leader and businessman, helped free slaves from the Enterprise
- Richard Tucker (American politician) (c. 1818–1881), American carpenter, undertaker, and state legislator in North Carolina
- Richard Tucker (wool-scourer) (1856–1922), New Zealand wool-scourer and wool-classer
- Richard Hawley Tucker (1859–1952), American astronomer
- Richard Tucker (actor) (1884–1942), American film actor
- Dick Tucker (American football) (1926–2018), American junior college football coach and athletics administrator
