= Samuel Tucker =

Samuel Tucker may refer to:

- Samuel Tucker (golfer) (1875–??), English golfer
- Samuel Tucker (naval officer) (1747–1833), American naval officer
- Samuel Tucker (politician) (1721–1789), American politician
- Samuel Wilbert Tucker (1913–1990), American attorney

== See also ==
- Sam Tucker (1895–1973), English rugby union footballer
