= Mary Tucker =

Mary Tucker may refer to:

- Mary B. Tucker (1824-1898), American folk painter
- Mary Evelyn Tucker, American professor
- Mary Frances Tucker (1837–1902), American poet
- Mary Logan Tucker (1858–1940), American activist
- Mary Tucker (sport shooter) (born 2001), American sports shooter
- Mary Tucker Thorp (1899–1974), American teacher, educator, and school principal
- Mary Cooper née Tucker, character in the US TV series The Big Bang Theory and Young Sheldon
