= Susan Tucker =

Susan Tucker may refer to:

- Susan Tucker (politician), state senator for the US state of Massachusetts
- Susan Tucker (historian), American historian who formerly worked at the Newcomb Archives

== See also ==
- Susan
- Tucker (surname)
