= Leon Hapgood =

English footballer

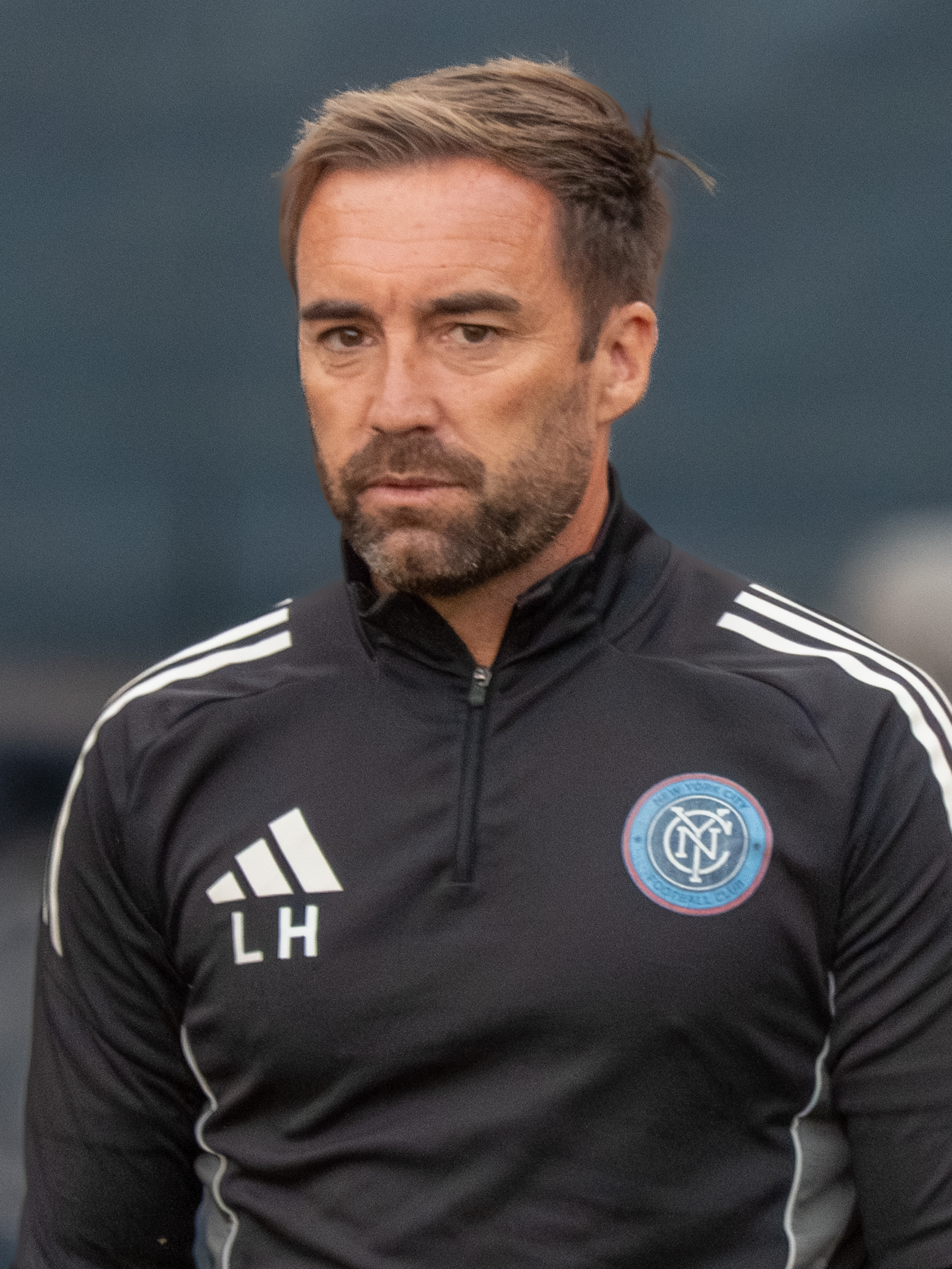
- Hapgood coaching New York City FC in 2025

Personal information
- Full name: Leon Duane Hapgood
- Date of birth: 7 August 1979 (age 47)
- Place of birth: Torquay, England
- Positions: Midfielder; forward

Team information
- Current team: New York City FC (Assistant Coach)

Youth career
- 1996–1998: Torquay United

Senior career*
Years	Team	Apps	(Gls)
1997–1999	Torquay United	70	(7)
1999–2000	Plymouth Argyle	0	(0)
1999	Bideford (loan)		
2000	Yeovil Town		
2000–2001	Taunton Town		
2001–2002	Merthyr Tydfil		
2002–2003	Taunton Town		
2003–2004	Bideford		
2004–2007	Clevedon Town		
2007	Torquay United	1	(0)
2007	Liskeard Athletic		
2007–2008	Bideford		

Managerial career
- 2008–2018: Calgary Foothills (coach)
- 2018–2021: Calgary Foothills (technical director)
- 2019–2021: Cavalry FC (assistant)
- 2022–2024: Cavalry FC (technical director)
- 2024–: New York City FC (assistant coach)
- * Club domestic league appearances and goals

Leon Duane Hapgood (born 7 August 1979) is an English football manager and former player who serves as an Assistant Coach with New York City FC.

As a player, he represented England Schoolboys.

== Playing career ==
Hapgood was born in Torquay and began his career as an apprentice with Torquay United, scoring on his league debut in September 1997 while still an apprentice, coming on as a 38th-minute substitute for the injured Steve McCall in the 3–0 win at Plainmoor against Brighton & Hove Albion.

He turned professional in May 1998, but played only a peripheral role in Wes Saunders' side the following season. In June 1999 he was offered a three-month contract by Torquay, but was released in August, almost immediately teaming up with his former manager Kevin Hodges on trial at Plymouth Argyle. He signed non-contract terms with the Pilgrims, but was allowed to join former Torquay player Sean William Joyce's Bideford on loan in November 1999. On 7 February 2000 he joined Conference side Yeovil Town after failing to break into the Plymouth first team.

In June 2000 he moved to Taunton Town, managed by former Torquay player Russell Musker, playing as a substitute in Taunton's 2-1 FA Vase Final win over Berkhamsted Town on 6 May 2001 at Villa Park.

He subsequently moved to Merthyr Tydfil in December 2001. At the end of that season he moved to the United States to work as a coach, returning to the UK to play for Taunton in October 2002. He moved to Bideford in February 2003, initially on loan as he recovered from injury, and left Bideford to join Clevedon Town in June 2004.

On 10 January 2007 he rejoined Torquay United on an initial one-month contract, which was later extended for a second month. However, he was released by Torquay on 11 March 2007 when his contract expired. After starting the 2007–2008 season with Liskeard Athletic, he subsequently re-joined Bideford.

== Managerial career ==
Hapgood resumed his North American coaching career in August 2008 with Calgary Foothills. In 2018, after the departure of Tommy Wheeldon Jr. to Cavalry FC, Hapgood was appointed technical director of USL League Two side Calgary Foothills. The following year, he began working as a part-time assistant coach with Cavalry FC. On 15 February 2022, Hapgood departed Foothills to join Cavalry FC full-time as the club's technical director. On February 1, 2024, Cavalry announced that Hapgood was leaving to become an Assistant Coach with New York City Football Club. His appointment by NYCFC was announced by the club on the same day
