= Ira Schuster =

American songwriter

Ira Schuster (October 13, 1889 – October 10, 1946) was an American songwriter, who worked as a pianist at various publishing companies on Tin Pan Alley in the early 20th century. He was also known as John Siras.

== Biography ==
He was born in New York City on October 13, 1889, to Sarah and Morris Schuster. His father was from Germany and his mother from England. He had a brother, John Schuster. Schuster married Minnie and had two children, Wallace Schuster and Phoebe Schuster.

Schuster collaborated with other notable songwriters of the time, and had a string of hits in the 1910s, 1920s and 1930s. Schuster was also one of the first songwriters to form his own publishing company. His best known songs include "Hold Me," "In a Shanty in Old Shanty Town," "Ten Little Fingers and Ten Little Toes," "I Am an American," "Go Home and Tell Your Mother," "Any Day Now," "I'm Alone Because I Love You" and "Let’s Grow Old Together."

Schuster died in New York, aged 55, in October 1946.

== Legacy ==
He was inducted into the Songwriters Hall of Fame.
