= George B. Willis =

American legislator

George B. Willis (died June 1900) was a state legislator in North Carolina. He represented Craven County in the North Carolina House of Representatives in 1870.

Richard Tucker and Edward R. Dudley were fellow African American state legislators from New Bern. Craven County was represented by several African Americans during the period.

Willis commanded Company H of the 1st North Carolina State Troops, a state militia united raised to maintain order during the Kirk–Holden war of 1870.

== Early life ==
George B. Willis was born enslaved. A mulatto, he worked as a cooper. In 1865 he cofounded the Rue Chapel African Methodist Episcopal Church and a Solomon's Lodge in New Bern.

== Kirk–Holden war ==
In 1870, members of the Ku Klux Klan, a white supremacist organization, lynched Alamance County black politician Wyatt Outlaw and murdered State Senator John W. Stephens of Caswell County. In response, Governor of North Carolina William Woods Holden, declared Alamance and Caswell to be in a state of insurrection and mobilized two militia regiments to restore order and arrest Klansmen. The ensuing police operation became known as the Kirk–Holden war. William J. Clarke of New Bern raised the 1st North Carolina Regiment, comprising eight regiments, including Company H, composed entirely of black volunteers from Craven County. Willis was given the rank of captain and given charge of the company, which was mustered into service on July 12. Company H arrived in Raleigh by rail on July 19 and encamped at Old Baptist Grove. Clarke instructed Willis to ensure his company abided strict codes of discipline and drilled frequently.

== Political career ==
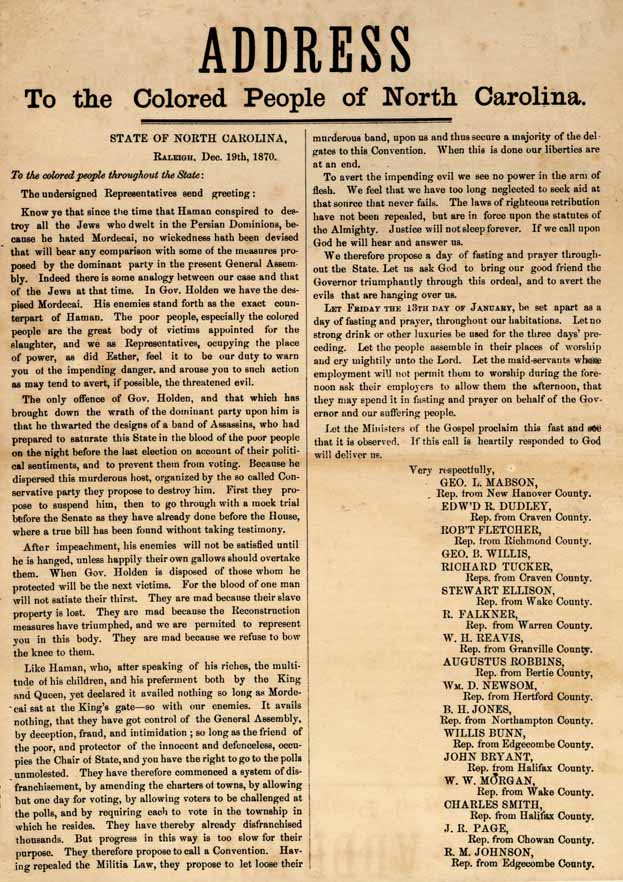
Address to the Colored People of North Carolina. Broadside published December 1870 signed by 17 state legislators warning of consequences of removal from office of Governor Holden

Willis was elected to the New Bern Board of Aldermen in 1869.

In 1870, Willis ran as a Republican for a seat representing Craven County in the North Carolina House of Representatives. He and two other blacks, Richard Tucker and Edward R. Dudley, won, and he thus served in the House from 1870 to 1872. The Conservative-dominated legislature met in its first session in December 1870 and quickly drew up articles of impeachment against Holden for his conduct during the Kirk–Holden war. All black representatives opposed impeachment and Willis joined 16 other black representatives in signing a joint "Address to the Colored People of North Carolina" warning the state's black population that Conservatives were attempting to strip them of their rights.

Following the encouragement of New Bern's municipal government, Willis and two others founded the Reliance Bucket and Axe Fire Company, a volunteer fire company to serve the city's black community in 1868. It was formally incorporated in 1870. He joined the Order of Good Templars in 1871 and in 1873 cofounded the Mechanics and Laborers Mutual Aid Society of North Carolina. He also served on the board of trustees for the New Bern Academy in the 1870s. He became principal of the public school in James City in 1888.

== Later life ==
Willis remarried in 1892 and again in 1900. He died in June 1900.

== See also ==
- African American officeholders from the end of the Civil War until before 1900
- List of first African-American U.S. state legislators

== Works cited ==
- Balanoff, Elizabeth (January 1972). "Negro Legislators in the North Carolina General Assembly, July, 1868-February, 1872". The North Carolina Historical Review. 49 (1): 22–55. JSTOR 23529002.
- Bishir, Catherine W. (2013). Crafting Lives : African American Artisans in New Bern, North Carolina, 1770-1900. Chapel Hill: The University of North Carolina Press. ISBN 9781469608761.
- Houston, Claudia B. (2018). "History of the New Bern Fire Department History Part II: Post Civil War" (PDF). Journal of the New Bern Historical Society. XXV (1): 3–14.
- McGuire, Samuel B. (July 2014). "The Making of a Black Militia Company: New Bern Troops in the Kirk-Holden War, 1870". The North Carolina Historical Review. 91 (3): 288–322. JSTOR 44113199.
- Watson, Alan D. (1987). A History of New Bern and Craven County. New Bern: Tryon Palace Commission. OCLC 17398679.
