= Lee Tucker =

Lee Tucker may refer to:

- Lee Tucker (footballer, born 1971), English football player for Middlesbrough and Darlington
- Lee Tucker (footballer, born 1978), English football player for Torquay
