= David Tucker =

David Tucker or Dave Tucker may refer to:

- David Tucker (poet) (born 1947), American poet and news editor
- Dave Tucker (geologist), geologist in Washington state
- David Tucker (sailor) (born 1941), British Olympic sailor
- David W. Tucker (1929–2003), jazz trombonist, music educator and composer
- Dave Tucker (rugby league), English rugby league footballer of the 1960s
- Dave Tucker (rugby union) (born 1962), Canadian rugby union player
- David Tucker (politician), Vermont politician
