= USS Whitney =

Tender of the United States Navy

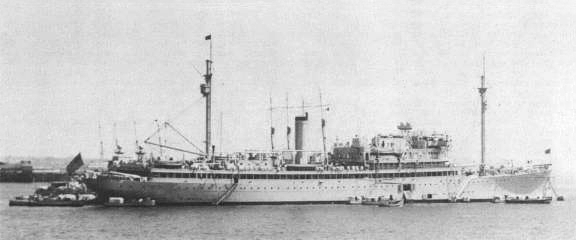
- USS Whitney (AD-4) at San Diego in 1932

History

United States
- Name: USS Whitney
- Namesake: William Collins Whitney
- Laid down: 23 April 1921
- Launched: 12 October 1923
- Commissioned: 2 September 1924
- Decommissioned: 22 October 1946
- Fate: Sold for scrap, 18 March 1948

General characteristics
- Class & type: Dobbin-class destroyer tender
- Displacement: 8,325 long tons (8,459 t)
- Length: 483 ft 9 in (147.45 m)
- Beam: 61 ft (19 m)
- Draft: 17 ft 2 in (5.23 m)
- Speed: 16 kn (18 mph; 30 km/h)
- Complement: 416 officers and enlisted
- Armament: 8 × 5 in (130 mm) guns; 4 × 3 in (76 mm) guns; 2 × 6-pounder guns; 2 × 21 in (530 mm) torpedo tubes

USS Whitney (AD-4) was a Dobbin-class destroyer tender named for United States Secretary of the Navy William Collins Whitney. She was launched on 12 October 1923, and was commissioned on 2 September 1924.

She was on station in Pearl Harbor at the time of the Japanese attack. Whitney was undamaged during the attack. She was decommissioned on 22 October 1946, later being sold for scrap to the Dulien Ship Products on 18 March 1948.

== Early service ==
Together with her sistership Dobbin, the destroyer tender was designed to provide service, supplies, and repairs for three divisions of destroyers for a two-month period under wartime conditions. Her facilities included storage for fuel and lubricating oil, fresh water, provisions, spare parts, and repair facilities such as optical and machine shops.

Following her shakedown and trials, Whitney, initially based at Boston, Massachusetts, tended destroyers of the Atlantic Fleet and soon thereafter commenced a routine of following the fleet south for the winter, operating out of such ports as Gonaives, Haiti, and Guantanamo Bay, Cuba. She first visited the Panama Canal Zone in February 1926 and returned to Hampton Roads in the spring. During the more temperate months of the year, Whitney operated from ports along the eastern seaboard of the United States.

She followed a steady routine of summer and winter fleet movements until February 1932, when she transited the Panama Canal for the first time, en route to the California ports of San Diego and San Francisco. After operating on the Pacific coast for the next two years, Whitney returned to the Caribbean in April 1934 and to Hampton Roads that June. However, her stay in the Atlantic was a brief one, for she was back on the Pacific coast that autumn, reflecting growing American concern about the naval challenge to the United States in the Pacific resulting from the expansionist aspirations of Japan.

After repairs at Mare Island Naval Shipyard in December 1934, Whitney visited Port Angeles, Washington, in May 1935, supporting destroyers taking part in Fleet Problem XVI, the fleet maneuvers conducted that year in the northern Pacific from the coast of Alaska to the vicinity of Hawaii. During Fleet Problem XVI, Whitney also visited Dutch Harbor, Alaska, and made her first voyage to Pearl Harbor, Oahu.

Back at San Diego in June, Whitney remained on the west coast for a year before heading for the east coast in June 1936, following Fleet Problem XVII. She subsequently tended the Battle Fleet's destroyers at Balboa, Canal Zone, in the autumn and returned to San Diego in November 1936.

With Fleet Problem XVIII during the spring of 1937, Whitney joined the fleet train in voyaging directly to Pearl Harbor in April. She remained in Hawaiian waters only a month, though, before she returned to San Diego following the Battle Force vs. augmented Scouting Force exercises. The destroyer tender followed the same routine the following year, visiting Pearl Harbor in May 1938, as part of Fleet Problem XIX.

Whitney transited the Panama Canal again in January 1939 and operated briefly out of Bahía Limón, Canal Zone. After participating in Fleet Problem XX, Whitney returned through the canal to the west coast, reaching San Diego in May.

Following the movement of the fleet to Hawaii that had begun upon conclusion of Fleet Problem XXI in April 1940, Whitney made another trip there in the autumn of that year. The destroyer tender performed her vital but unglamorous duties at Pearl Harbor into the summer of 1941. She departed Hawaiian waters on 20 August, proceeded to the west coast, and touched at San Diego and Long Beach before returning to Oahu on 18 September.

== Pearl Harbor attack ==
At Pearl Harbor, the destroyers Tucker, Conyngham, Reid, Case, and Selfridge were moored alongside Whitney at berths X-8 and X-8S. The destroyer tender was providing steam, electricity, as well as flushing and fresh water to the five destroyers.

Whitney sailors witnessed the beginning of the Japanese attack and at 0800 the ship went to general quarters. A minute later, the first Japanese plane passed over the Whitney nest, strafing as it came. Within five minutes of the general alarm, Whitney had unlimbered her .50-caliber machine guns.

At 0809, she began to make preparations to get underway, and began issuing supplies to the ships alongside, most in "coldiron" status with dead machinery plants due to their upkeep status. A minute later, Whitney began firing her heavier 3-inch antiaircraft guns at the Japanese attacker's aircraft.

Whitney began issuing ammunition and ordnance stores to the destroyers alongside at 0830, securing steam devices to those ships at about the same time. At 1000, shortly after the attack ended, Reid and Selfridge got underway, followed much later by Case, Tucker, and Conyngham. Although all Japanese planes had cleared the area shortly after 0945, jittery gunners, uncertain of the nationality of any planes appearing overhead, fired accidentally at American aircraft throughout the day, Whitney logging firings at 1105 and 2110.

After the Japanese left, Whitney received orders to remain at anchor. At 1335, the tender sent over five lengths of hose and two submersible pumps to Raleigh, then fighting for survival where she had been torpedoed alongside Ford Island early in the attack. With no wounded on board, Whitney's doctors assisted in handling casualties on board Solace moored nearby.

== Service in World War II ==
Over the next few months, Whitney performed her vital tender services at Pearl Harbor, before she took on a cargo of ammunition, torpedoes, fuel, and supplies in late April 1942 and departed Hawaiian waters on the 18th of that month bound for the Tonga Islands. Ultimately arriving at Tongatabu on 29 May 1942, Whitney operated at that port, providing services to destroyers and other combatant ships through midsummer.

Departing Tongatabu on 16 August, nine days after the start of Operation Watchtower, the invasion of the Solomons and the first American amphibious assault of the war, Whitney arrived in Noumea, New Caledonia, on the 20th. She was based there during the critical period in the Solomons operations and provided battle-damage repairs and tender upkeep services to numerous destroyers, enabling them to return quickly to action and help the United States Navy to gain the upper hand.

Very much in need of an overhaul for herself and rest and recreation for her crew, Whitney departed Noumea, headed for Australian waters, and reached Sydney on 23 April for a fortnight's stay.

Returning to Noumea on 8 May, Whitney repaired over the next few months and kept in operation many units of the hard-pressed destroyer forces which were fighting for the northern Solomons. Heading for the New Hebrides on 10 September, she arrived at Espiritu Santo on the 12th and conducted her vital labors there until 27 October, when she received orders sending her to Purvis Bay in the Solomons.

From late October 1943 through late May 1944, Whitney serviced many types of ships and craft at Purvis Bay, Tulagi, before she returned, via Noumea, to Australian waters on 23 June 1944.

Back in business in early July, Whitney reached Manus, in the Admiralties, on 3 July, and remained there for a month, providing tender services. She then shifted to Espiritu Santo, arriving there on 10 August. She subsequently touched at Macquitti Bay, Russell Islands; and Guadalcanal, before returning to Espiritu Santo on 29 August.

After operating again out of Purvis Bay and Manus, Whitney arrived at Hollandia, New Guinea, on 23 January 1945. However, her stay in port was brief, for she got underway again in four days, bound for the Philippines.

Reaching San Pedro Bay, off the island of Leyte, on the last day of January 1945, Whitney remained in those waters through V-J Day in mid-August.

== Decommissioning and scrapping ==
After returning to San Diego, Whitney was decommissioned on 22 October 1946 and transferred to the custody of the Maritime Commission at Suisun Bay, California, on 21 November 1946. She was struck from the Navy list on 22 January 1947 and sold for scrap to the Dulien Ship Products firm on 18 March 1948.

== Notable crew ==
Dallas police detective Jim Leavelle, who became renowned for escorting Lee Harvey Oswald when Oswald was shot by Jack Ruby, served aboard the Whitney and was on board during the attack on Pearl Harbor.

Machinist Mate 1st Class Ernest L. Quetschke served on Whitney from the onset of WWII to the end of WWII. "Ernie" doubled as a 6-pounder Hotchkiss gunner for his on-deck duties. Ernest Quetschke returned home to his hometown of Toledo, Ohio after the war ended.

== Namesake ==
The ship was named for William Collins Whitney. He received his higher education at Yale and Harvard and settled in New York City to practice law. As corporation counsel of that city between 1875 and 1882, Whitney completely reorganized and simplified the work of his department, thus saving taxpayers thousands of dollars annually.

After becoming United States Secretary of the Navy in the cabinet of President Grover Cleveland in 1885, Whitney proved to be a powerful advocate of naval expansion, desiring that the warships of the United States Navy be equal to the best in the world. Under his administration, that service made progress towards becoming the "New Navy."
