= Toccata (disambiguation) =

Toccata is a type of virtuoso instrumental musical composition.

Toccata may also refer to:

- Toccata (Khachaturian), a 1932 piece in E-flat minor for solo piano by Aram Khachaturian
- Toccata (Prokofiev), a 1912 piece in D minor for solo piano, Op. 11 by Sergei Prokofiev
- Toccata (Schumann), an 1830 sonata-allegro piece in C major, Op. 7 by Robert Schumann
- "Toccata" (song), a 1973 arrangement by Emerson, Lake, & Palmer
- Toccata (film), a 1969 Dutch film directed by Herman van der Horst
- Toccata Classics, a British music label

== See also ==
- Toccata and Fugue (disambiguation)
