= Fantasia and Fugue =

Fantasia and Fugue may refer to several compositions attributed mainly to Johann Sebastian Bach:

- Chromatic Fantasia and Fugue, for harpsichord
- Fantasia and Fugue in C minor, BWV 537, for organ
- Great Fantasia and Fugue in G minor, BWV 542, for organ
- Fantasia and Fugue in A minor, BWV 561, for organ; see Bach-Werke-Verzeichnis
- Fantasia and Fugue in C minor, BWV 562, for organ
- Fantasia and Imitatio in B minor, BWV 563, for organ; see Bach-Werke-Verzeichnis
- Fantasia and Fugue in C minor, BWV 906, for harpsichord
- Fantasia and Fugue in A minor, BWV 944, for organ
- Fantasy and Fugue on the Theme B-A-C-H, for organ (and later piano) by Franz Liszt
- Fantasy No. 1 with Fugue (Mozart), for piano by Wolfgang Amadeus Mozart

== See also ==
- List of compositions by Johann Sebastian Bach
- Prelude and fugue
- Toccata and Fugue (disambiguation)
