= USS Tucker =

Two ships in the United States Navy have been named USS Tucker for Officer Samuel Tucker.

- USS Tucker (DD-57) was the lead ship of her class of destroyers, commissioned in 1916, served in World War I, transferred to the United States Coast Guard as USCGC Tucker (CG-23) and struck in 1936.
- USS Tucker (DD-374) was a Mahan-class destroyer, commissioned in 1936, served in World War II, and sank following hitting a mine in August 1942.

== See also ==
- USS Henry W. Tucker
