= Charles Tucker =

Charles Tucker may refer to:

- Trip Tucker (Charles Tucker III), a fictional character in Star Trek: Enterprise
- Charles Tucker (politician) (1857–1928), Australian politician
- Charles Tucker (British Army officer) (died 1935), British Army General
- Charles Tucker (police officer) (died 1910), British police officer
- Charles E. Tucker Jr., major general in the United States Air National Guard
- Charles Tucker, a fictional character in the 2026 film The End of Oak Street
