= Joseph Tucker =

Joseph Tucker may refer to:

- Joseph Tucker (Massachusetts politician) (1832–1907), lieutenant governor of Massachusetts, 1869–1873
- Joseph John Tucker (1832–1914), Canadian politician
- Joseph Tucker (cricketer) (born 1979), English cricketer
- Joseph H. Tucker (1819–1894), banker, businessman and Illinois militia colonel
- Joe Tucker, British comedy writer
- Joe Tucker (footballer) (1913–1980), Australian rules footballer who played with Geelong
- Joseph Tucker (Royal Navy official) (c. 1760–1838), British surveyor of the Navy
- Joe Tucker (sportscaster) (1909–1986), Canadian-American radio and television sportscaster
