= Jerry Tucker =

Jerry Tucker may refer to:

- Jerry Tucker (actor) (1925–2016), American child actor
- Jerry Tucker (labor leader) (died 2012), American workers' rights activist and educator
