= Donald Tucker =

Donald or Don Tucker may refer to:

- Donald Kofi Tucker (1938–2005), American politician in New Jersey
- Donald L. Tucker (born 1935), American politician in Florida
- Don M. Tucker, American cognitive neuroscientist, neuropsychologist and professor
