= Tucker (given name) =

Origin
- Origin: Old English, Old Saxon, Gaeilge
- Meaning: derived from various Germanic verbs meaning "to torment"
- Region of origin: England, Germany, Ireland

Other names
- Variant forms: Tukker, Toher

Tucker is a given name of mixed origin, likely deriving from the occupational surname referring to a "cloth-softener". The word 'Tucker' comes from the German word Tucher, meaning cloth-weaver.

== People with the given name "Tucker" include ==
=== A ===
- Tucker Addington (born 1997), American football player
- Tucker Albrizzi (born 2000), American actor
- Tucker Ashford (born 1954), American baseball player

=== B ===
- Tucker Barnhart (born 1991), American baseball player
- Tucker Beathard (born 1995), American singer-songwriter
- Tucker Bone (born 1996), American soccer player
- Tucker Bounds (born 1979), American politician

=== C ===
- Tucker Carlson (born 1969), American television host
- Tucker Cawley, American journalist and television show host
- Tucker Croft (??–1955), Irish footballer

=== D ===
- Tucker Davidson (born 1996), American baseball player
- Tucker DeVries (born 2002), American basketball player
- Tucker Dupree (born 1989), American swimmer
- Tucker Durkin (born 1990), American lacrosse player

=== E ===
- Tucker Elliot, American sportswriter
- Tucker Eskew (born 1962), American political strategist

=== F ===
- Tucker Fisk (born 1999), American football player
- Tucker Fredricks (born 1984), American speed skater
- Tucker Frederickson (born 1943), American football player

=== G ===
- Tucker Gates, American television director
- Tucker Gleason, American football player
- Tucker Gougelmann (1917–1975), American army officer

=== H ===
- Tucker Hibbert (born 1984), American snowboarder
- Tucker Hollingsworth (born 1984), American photographer
- Tucker Hume (born 1993), American soccer player

=== K ===
- Tucker Kraft (born 2000), American football player

=== L ===
- Tucker Lepley (born 2002), American soccer player

=== M ===
- Tucker Martine (born 1972), American record producer
- Tucker Max (born 1975), American author
- Tucker McCann (born 1997), American football player
- Tucker L. Melancon (born 1946), American judge
- Tucker Murphy (born 1991), American-British skier

=== N ===
- Tucker Neale (born 1972), American basketball player
- Tucker Nichols (born 1970), American artist

=== P ===
- Tucker Poolman (born 1993), American ice hockey player

=== R ===
- Tucker Reed (born 1989), American murderer and author
- Tucker Richardson, American basketball player
- Tucker Rountree (born 1981), American songwriter
- Tucker Rule, American Drummer (Thursday, L.S. Dunes, Frank Iero and the Patience)

=== S ===
- Tucker Smallwood (born 1944), American author
- Tucker Smith (1936–1988), American actor
- Tucker P. Smith (1898–1970), American academic

=== T ===
- Tucker Toman (born 2003), American baseball player
- Tucker Tooley (born 1968/1969), American film producer

=== V ===
- Tucker Vorster (born 1988), South African tennis player

=== W ===
- Tucker West (born 1995), American luger
- Tucker Wetmore (born 1999), American country singer-songwriter
- Tucker Wiard (1941–2022), American television editor

=== Z ===
- Tucker Zimmerman (born 1941), American singer-songwriter

== Fictional characters ==
- Tucker Foley, a character on the Nicktoon Danny Phantom
- Tucker Jenkins, played by actor Todd Carty in the BBC television series Grange Hill and spin-off Tucker's Luck
- Tucker McCall, a character on the soap opera The Young and the Restless

== See also ==
- Tucker (surname), a page for people with the surname "Tucker"
