= Henry Tucker =

Henry Tucker may refer to:

- Henry Tucker of The Grove (1713–1787), Southampton Parish, Bermuda merchant, politician, militia officer, and co-conspirator in St. George's gunpowder theft
- Henry Tucker (Bermudian politician, born 1742) (1742–1800), St. George's, Bermuda politician, president of council of Bermuda, acting governor of Bermuda
- Sir Henry Tucker (Bermudian politician, born 1903) (1903–1986), first premier of Bermuda
- Henry Tucker (Sherbro), merchant in Sherbro, Sierra Leone
- Henry Holcombe Tucker (1819–1889), chancellor of the University of Georgia, of Bermudian descent
- Henry St George Tucker (financier) (1771–1851), Bermudian financier and official of the East India Company
- Henry St. George Tucker Sr. (1780–1848), U.S. representative from Virginia
  - SS Henry St. George Tucker, a Liberty ship
- Henry Tucker (colonial storekeeper) (1793–1850), Royal Navy officer and colonial storekeeper in the colony of New Zealand
- Henry St. George Tucker Jr. (1828–1863), son of Henry St. George Tucker Sr., after whom St. George, West Virginia, is named
- Henry St. George Tucker III (1853–1932), U.S. representative from Virginia
- Henry St. George Tucker (bishop) (1874–1959), bishop of the Episcopal Church in the United States
- Henry W. Tucker (1919–1942), U.S. sailor for whom the USS Henry W. Tucker was named

== See also ==
- USS Henry W. Tucker, and USS Henry W. Tucker (DE-377), United States Navy ships
