= Justice Tucker =

Justice Tucker may refer to:

- Henry St. George Tucker Sr. (1780–1848), justice of the Court of Appeals of Virginia
- St. George Tucker (1752–1827), justice of the Court of Appeals of Virginia

== See also ==
- Judge Tucker (disambiguation)
