= Albert Tucker =

Albert Tucker may refer to:

- Albert Tucker (politician) (1843–1902), member of the Victorian Legislative Assembly
- Albert W. Tucker (1905–1995), Canadian mathematician
- Albert Tucker (artist) (1914–1999), Australian painter
- Al Tucker (Albert Ames Tucker Jr., 1943–2001), American basketball player
