= Lynching of John Tucker =

1845 murder in Indianapolis, Indiana, U.S.

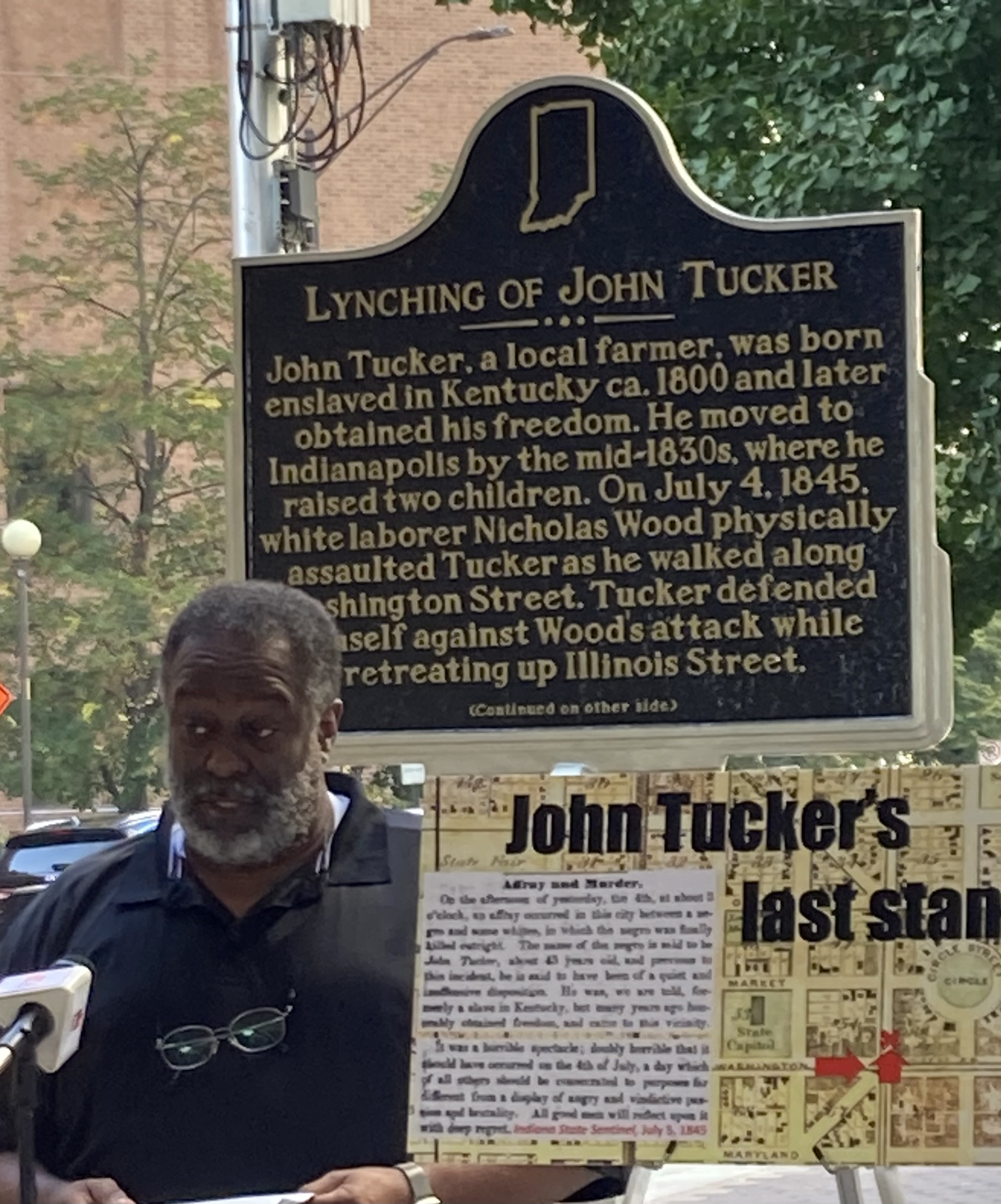
- IRC member Leon Bates at the unveiling of the memorial to John Tucker in 2023
- Date: July 4, 1845
- Location: Indianapolis, Indiana, U.S.; 39°46′02.39″N 86°09′36.48″W
- Type: Lynching
- Theme: Racial terror
- Cause: Drunkenness
- Target: John Tucker
- Perpetrators: Nicholas Wood, Edward Davis, and William Ballenger

John Tucker (born around 1800) was the victim of a racial terror lynching that took place on July 4, 1845, in downtown Indianapolis, Indiana, United States. Tucker was a free Black man, a husband and a father, who was working as a farmer at the time of his death. Tucker was attacked and killed by three drunken white men in front of a crowd. Two of the men were arrested for Tucker's murder, but only one was convicted.

== Life ==
In his early life, John Tucker was enslaved in Kentucky. Tucker obtained his freedom and relocated to Indianapolis. At the time of his death, he and his wife were the parents of two young children, Mary and William. The family lived "in a house near the intersection of St. Clair and Delaware Streets" in downtown Indianapolis. Tucker worked as a farmer for City Postmaster Samuel Henderson.

== Lynching ==
On the afternoon of July 4, 1845, John Tucker was lynched in downtown Indianapolis. Finding himself being accosted by a drunken white man, Nicholas Wood, Tucker began to walk toward the Indianapolis Magistrate's office to seek help. But Wood was soon joined by two other white men, William Ballenger (a saloon owner) and Edward Davis. According to the Indiana State Sentinel, an Indiana newspaper that covered the lynching, the assailants attacked Tucker with clubs, stones, and brickbats. The minister of Second Presbyterian Church, located very near the site of Tucker's death, Reverend Henry Ward Beecher, wrote that Tucker "defended himself with desperate determination" during the attack. While a few people attempted to "separate Tucker from his assaulters," a large crowd gathered who cheered for Tucker's death. Those involved continued to beat Tucker after he was already dead.

== Aftermath: trials and impact ==
Two of the three men who committed this crime, Nicholas Wood and Edward Davis, were arrested and tried for John Tucker's murder. The third man, William Ballenger, was never apprehended. Nicholas Wood was convicted of manslaughter, but Edward Davis was acquitted. The Sentinel "speculated on the reasoning for the differing verdicts, noting Wood was found guilty because he 'commenced the affray, and followed it up to its conclusion.'" Wood was sentenced to three years of hard labor at the state penitentiary. It was rare for a white person to be tried, let alone, convicted, for the lynching of a Black person at this time. Whites who believed a white person should not be punished for attacking a Black man requested a retrial of Wood. Their request was denied, however, and Indiana governor James Whitcomb refused to pardon Wood.

The lynching of John Tucker had a strong impact on the Black community in Indianapolis. Many in the community began going out armed with clubs for protection. In the ensuing years, they faced not only the threat of racial violence but increasingly discriminatory laws. The lynching had lasting effects even decades later, as Black men who could vote remembered the legal system's weak response to the Tucker case.

== Memorial marker ==
On September 30, 2023, the Indiana Remembrance Coalition (IRC) and the Indiana Historical Bureau unveiled a state historical marker recounting the Tucker lynching. The marker describes the events leading up to the murder of Tucker. "Uncovering and documenting uncomfortable history is an obligation that we all must share," said Eunice Trotter, director of Indiana Landmarks' Black Heritage Preservation Program and a member of the IRC. The marker is located along the Indianapolis Cultural Trail at the corner of Illinois and Washington streets in downtown Indianapolis.
