= John A. Tucker =

John Aloysius Tucker (June 18, 1896 - February 16, 1971) was a fireman and a music composer. He was songwriting partners with Joseph Schuster. He was a co-founder of Tucker and Merchant, a music publishing company.

== Biography ==
He was born on June 18, 1896, in Manhattan, New York City. He joined the New York City Fire Department in 1920 and played in the fire department band. He joined the American Society of Composers, Authors and Publishers in 1924 and left the fire department in 1929 to concentrate on his music.

He rejoined the New York City Fire Department in 1937 and remained until he retired in 1958. He died on February 16, 1971, in Queens, New York City.

== Songs ==
- Third Alarm
- Dance of the Paper Dolls
- Sleep, Baby, Sleep
- The Christmas Polka
