= Malcolm Tucker (disambiguation) =

Malcolm Tucker is a fictional character on the British political satire The Thick of It.

Malcolm Tucker may also refer to:

- Malcolm Tucker (footballer) (born 1933), English footballer
- Malcolm Tucker (swimmer) (born 1947), British swimmer
