= Michael Tucker =

Michael Tucker may refer to:

- Michael Tucker (actor) (born 1945), (L.A. Law and Hill Street Blues)
- Michael Tucker (baseball) (born 1971), Major League Baseball outfielder
- Michael Tucker (basketball) (1954–2012), Australian Olympic basketball player
- Michael Tucker (director), film director
- Michael S. Tucker (born 1954), United States Army general
- Mick Tucker (1947–2002), musician in the band The Sweet
- Mickey Tucker (born 1941), American jazz pianist
- Mike Tucker (special effects artist), special effects expert and writer
- Mike Tucker (equestrian) (1944–2018), British equestrian commentator
- BloodPop (born 1990), real name Michael Tucker, American musician
- Michael Tucker (Chuck), a.k.a. "Big Mike", a fictional character in the television series Chuck
- Mike Tucker (The Archers), a fictional character from the British radio soap opera The Archers
