= Jim Tucker =

Jim Tucker may refer to:

- Jim Tucker (basketball) (1932–2020), American basketball player
- Jim Tucker (journalist) (1934–2013), journalist focused on the Bilderberg Group
- Jim B. Tucker, American psychiatrist, and reincarnation researcher
- Jim Guy Tucker (1943–2025), Arkansas political figure
- Jim Tucker (Louisiana politician) (born 1964), former speaker of the Louisiana House of Representatives
- Jim Tucker (1946–2020), former guitarist of The Turtles
- Jim Tucker, co-pilot of FedEx flight 705.

== See also ==
- James Tucker (disambiguation)
