= Darren Tucker =

Australian cricketer (born 1962)

Personal information
- Born: 2 June 1962 (age 64); Sydney, Australia
- Relatives: Max Tucker (son); Rod Tucker (brother)
- Source: ESPNcricinfo, 4 February 2017

Darren Tucker (born 2 June 1962) is an Australian cricketer. He played two List A matches for New South Wales in 1989/90.

== See also ==
- List of New South Wales representative cricketers
