= Judge Tucker =

Judge Tucker may refer to:

- Petrese B. Tucker (born 1951), judge of the United States District Court for the Eastern District of Pennsylvania
- St. George Tucker (1752–1827), judge of the General Court of Virginia and the Virginia Court of Appeals, and of the United States District Court for the District of Virginia and the Eastern District of Virginia

== See also ==
- Justice Tucker (disambiguation)
