= Max Tucker =

Australian-born Hong Kong cricketer

Personal information
- Full name: Maxwell Charles Tucker
- Born: 22 December 1991 (age 34); Melbourne, Victoria, Australia
- Batting: Left-handed
- Bowling: Right-arm slow medium
- Relatives: Darren Tucker (father); Rod Tucker (uncle)

International information
- National side: Hong Kong

Career statistics
Competition	List A
Matches	2
Runs scored	2
Batting average	1.00
100s/50s	–/–
Top score	2
Balls bowled	54
Wickets	1
Bowling average	39.00
5 wickets in innings	–
10 wickets in match	–
Best bowling	1/23
Catches/stumpings	–/–
- Source: Cricinfo, 21 May 2011

Maxwell 'Max' Charles Tucker (born 22 December 1991) is an Australian born Hong Kong cricketer. Tucker is a left-handed batsman who is a right-arm bowler. He was born in Melbourne, Victoria.

Having played age group cricket for Hong Kong Under-19s in the 2010 Under-19 World Cup, he made his World Cricket League debut for Hong Kong in the 2011 World Cricket League Division Two. It was in this tournament that he made his List A debut against Uganda. He played a further List A match in the competition, against Papua New Guinea. In his first match he was dismissed for a duck by Frank Nsubuga. He bowled 3 wicket-less overs in this match, for the cost of 16 runs. In his second match, he scored 2 runs before being dismissed by Andrew McIntosh. With the ball he claimed a single wicket, that of Tony Ura for the cost of 23 runs from 6 overs.

He is the son of Darren Tucker, who played 2 List A matches for New South Wales in 1989. His uncle is Rod Tucker, who played first-class cricket for New South Wales and Tasmania, and who is currently on the ICC Elite Umpire Panel.
