= Anthony Tucker =

Anthony Tucker may refer to:

- Anthony Tucker (basketball) (born 1969), American basketball player
- Anthony Tucker (American football) (born 1976), American football player and coach
- P. J. Tucker (Anthony Leon Tucker Jr.; born 1985), American basketball player
- The Beat Bully (Anthony Tucker; fl. 2000s), American record producer

== See also ==
- Anthony Tucker-Jones (born 1964), British military analyst and author
- Tucker Anthony, American investment banking firm
