= Tucker Hollingsworth =

American photographer (born 1984)

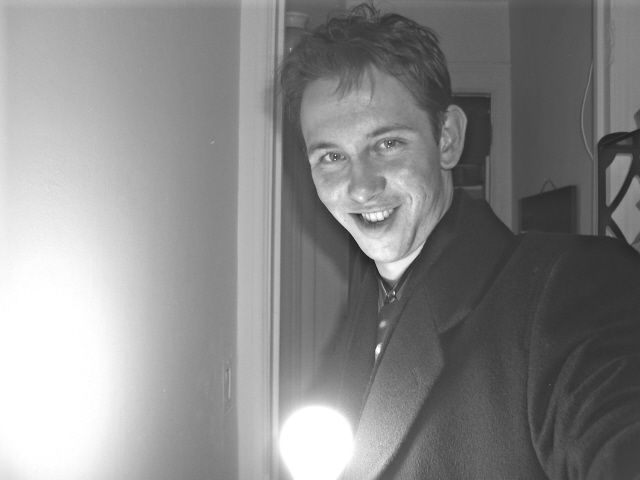
Tucker Hollingsworth, NY, NY, 2007

Tucker Hollingsworth (born 1984, Boston) is an American photographer primarily known for his conceptual-based projects that engage questions of self-consciousness, distortion, and attention. His photography has been described as "unusually poetic" and blends aesthetic playfulness and technical curiosity. Stylistically, many images are defined by high-keyed, jewel-tone colors and range from semi-representational landscapes to the highly abstract, textured noise images.

== List of works ==
=== Photo projects ===
- Highway (2012)
- Noise (2012)
- Horizons (2011)
- Urban Parkland Series (2009)

== Collections ==
- Weisman Art Museum (WAM), University of Minnesota, Minneapolis

== Fellowships and awards ==
- Residency at La Macina di San Cresci, Greve, Italy, 2013
- Lanesboro Arts Center Residency, 2012
- Virginia Center for the Creative Arts Fellowship, 2012
- Minnesota State Arts Board, 2012
- Ragdale Foundation Residency, 2012
- Tofte Lake Center, Jerome Foundation Residency, 2011
- Tofte Lake Center, Jerome Foundation Residency, 2010
