= Stanley Tucker =

Canadian owner of first Ford Mustang

Capt. Stanley Tucker
- Born: May 12, 1931; Newfoundland
- Died: June 10, 2008 (aged 77); Montreal, Quebec, Canada
- Spouse: Beryl Small (m. 1970)
- Children: 2

Captain Stanley Tucker (May 12, 1931 – June 10, 2008) was the first person in the world to purchase a Ford Mustang, and was the original owner of two milestone Mustangs built within the car's first two years of production. Tucker was a Canadian airline pilot for Eastern Provincial Airways of Newfoundland, Canada.

== Serial Number One ==
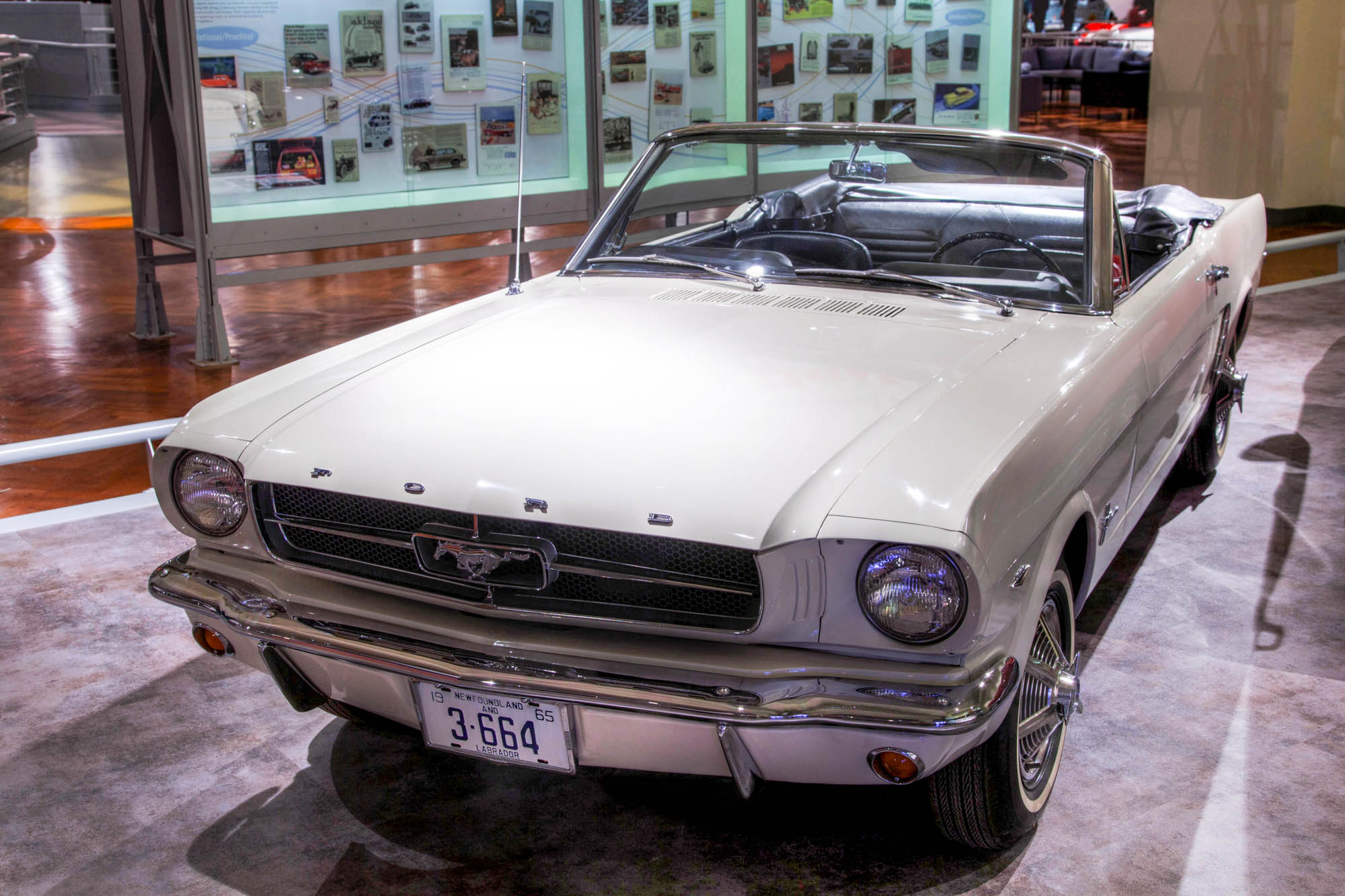
Mustang Serial Number One is the first Mustang produced. It was sold to Stanley Tucker of St. John's, Newfoundland, Canada on April 14, 1964, and is a 1965 model.

Before the car officially went on sale on April 17, 1964, thousands of Mustangs had been shipped to dealerships. Mustang Serial Number One (with serial number 5F08F100001) was one of approximately 180 pre-production cars built at the Ford Motor Company Rouge automobile factory between February 10 and March 5, 1964. These initial cars helped familiarize Ford workers and supervisors with the build process, and formed a batch of production cars that could be shipped to every major Ford dealer for the launch. The first cars built were sent to the farthest dealers—hence Serial Number One was sent 2,180 miles (3,508 km) to St. John's, Newfoundland.

On April 13, 1964, Tucker was driving past the Ford dealer when he noticed a big crowd and stopped to see what the commotion was about. The next day, Tucker returned and persuaded the salesman to sell him the car three days before April 17. At the time, he did not know he had purchased the first Mustang ever ordered. "For a long time, I was the only Mustang owner in Newfoundland. It was quite an experience" Tucker recalled. "Many times another motorist would force me to the side of the road to ask me about the car -- what it was, who made it, how I like it and how much it cost?"

== Serial Number 1,000,001 ==
Once it became known that Serial Number One had been inadvertently sold, Ford officials tried to buy it back from Tucker, who declined the request. By early 1966, when nearly one million Mustangs had been sold, the Ford Motor Company offered Tucker a trade: in exchange for returning Serial Number One, he could have the one-millionth Mustang free of charge. Tucker agreed. The car was a silver frost convertible with a black top, a deluxe black interior with a wood-grain steering wheel, styled steel wheels, Cruise-O-Matic transmission, air conditioning, Philco-Ford Stereosonic 8-track tape player, disc brakes and rally pac, and a Philco television. He kept the car until the 1970s.

Ford reclaimed Tucker's Serial Number One and donated it to The Henry Ford museum.
