= Amy Tucker =

Amy Tucker may refer to:

- Amy Tucker (game designer), designer of the collectible card game Xeko
- Amy Tucker (basketball), associate head coach of the Stanford Cardinal women's basketball team
