= Lee Tucker (footballer, born 1978) =

English footballer

Personal information
- Full name: Lee Antony Tucker
- Date of birth: 10 August 1978 (age 48)
- Place of birth: Plymouth, England
- Height: 5 ft 8 in (1.73 m)
- Position: Midfielder

Senior career*
Years	Team	Apps	(Gls)
1996–1997	Torquay United	1	(0)
- Yeovil Town
- * Club domestic league appearances and goals

Lee Antony Tucker (born 10 August 1978) is an English former footballer who played as a midfielder in the Football League for Torquay United. He also played non-league football for Yeovil Town.
