= Kevin Tucker =

Kevin Tucker may refer to:

- Kevin Tucker (hurler) (born 1975), Irish hurler
- Duke Tucker (Kevin Dale Tucker, born 1970), Wisconsin politician
- Kevin M. Tucker (1940–2012), American police commissioner
