= Andrew Tucker =

Andrew Tucker may refer to:

- Andrew Tucker (soccer) (born 1968), South African footballer
- Andrew Tucker (sport shooter) (1937–2003), Scottish-born sports shooter who represented England
