= Daniel Tucker =

Daniel Tucker or Dan Tucker may refer to:

== People ==
- Dan Tucker (lawman) (born 1849), American lawman and gunfighter
- Daniel Tucker, bassist for the band Obituary (from 1984 to present)
- Daniel Tucker, inaugural member of the Indigenous Advisory Council in Australia
- Daniel Tucker (colonial administrator) (1575–1625), Governor of Bermuda 1616 to 1619
- Daniel Tucker (minister) (1740–1818), American Methodist minister, captain in the American Revolution

== Fictional characters ==
- Dan Tucker, a fictional stunt coordinator portrayed by Winston Duke in the 2024 film The Fall Guy

== See also ==
- "Old Dan Tucker", an 1843 American folk song
