= Conservation Canines =

US non-profit organization

- Type: Non-profit
- Parent organization: University of Washington
- Website: conservationbiology.uw.edu/conservation-canines/

Conservation Canines (CK9) is a non-profit organization that trains detection dogs and their handlers for the purposes of wildlife research. It is part of the Center for Conservation Biology at the University of Washington. Since 1997, led by Dr. Samuel Wasser, Conservation Canines has worked internationally with species including the Pacific Pocket Mouse, the Jemez Mountains salamander, Killer whales, and Tigers.

The training facility is located in Eatonville, WA. Current and former client partners include The Nature Conservancy, U.S. Fish and Wildlife Service, U.S. Forest Service, as well as various universities and state and local agencies.

CK9 helped Western Ecological Research Center researchers survey conserved grasslands in San Diego County and found that indeed badgers are active.

Conservation Canines sources their dogs from shelters and rescue organizations. Dogs are trained using a ball or toy reward system.
