= Steve Tucker =

Steve Tucker may refer to:

- Steve Tucker (musician), member of Morbid Angel
- Steve Tucker (rower) (born 1969), American rower
