= Kinder Tucker =

New Zealand cricketer (1875–1939)

Personal information
- Full name: Kinder Houghton Tucker
- Born: 25 August 1875; Nelson, New Zealand
- Died: 24 November 1939 (aged 64); Wellington, New Zealand
- Batting: Right-handed
- Bowling: Right-arm leg-spin
- Relatives: Spencer Tucker (brother)

Domestic team information
- Years: Team
- 1895-96 to 1919-20: Wellington

Career statistics
Competition	First-class
Matches	40
Runs scored	1460
Batting average	22.81
100s/50s	0/9
Top score	86
Balls bowled	3144
Wickets	97
Bowling average	17.70
5 wickets in innings	7
10 wickets in match	2
Best bowling	7/31
Catches/stumpings	24/0
- Source: Cricket Archive, 26 January 2017

Kinder Houghton Tucker (25 August 1875 – 24 November 1939) was a cricketer and administrator for Wellington. He played four times for New Zealand in the days before New Zealand played Test cricket.

Born in Nelson, New Zealand, he played 40 first-class cricket matches from 1896 to 1920 and, following his retirement, was the long-serving selector for Wellington. He was the first player to score 10,000 runs in senior club and representative cricket in New Zealand. He was the brother of Spencer Tucker and William Tucker.

Tucker had a wife, and they had a daughter. He died in Wellington, New Zealand, where he worked as an engraver.

== Sources ==
- Whitehorn, Zane "George Orr", The Cricket Statistician, Autumn 2004, No. 127. Association of Cricket Statisticians and Historians: Nottingham.
