= Governor Tucker =

Governor Tucker may refer to:

- Daniel Tucker (colonial administrator) (1575–1625), 2nd Governor of Bermuda from 1616 to 1619
- Jim Guy Tucker (born 1943), 43rd Governor of Arkansas
- Tilghman Tucker (1802–1859), 13th Governor of Mississippi
