= Jason Tucker (footballer) =

English footballer

Personal information
- Full name: Jason James Tucker
- Date of birth: 3 February 1973 (age 53)
- Place of birth: Isleworth, England
- Position: Midfielder

Senior career*
Years	Team	Apps	(Gls)
1990–1992	Aldershot	1	(0)
1992	Yeading		
1996–1997	Enfield		
1997–1998	Aldershot Town	28	(10)
1998	Aylesbury United	1	(0)
1998–1999	Bishop's Stortford		
1999–2001	Hayes	6	(0)
2001–2004	Yeading		
2007–2012	Hanwell Town		
- * Club domestic league appearances and goals

Jason James Tucker (born 3 February 1973) is an English former professional footballer who played in the Football League as a midfielder.
