= Mary B. Tucker =

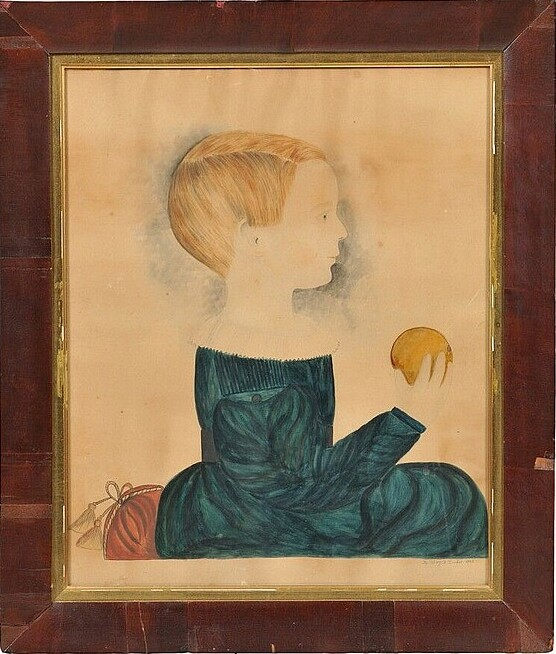
- Profile Portrait of a Boy Holding an Orange, 1842
- Born: January 8, 1824; New London
- Died: November 29, 1898 (aged 74); Norwood
- Occupation: Painter
- Parent(s): Thomas W. Tucker; Mary Orne Tucker

Mary Bagnall Tucker Fogg (January 8, 1824 – November 29, 1898) was an American folk painter. She is known for a series of distinctive watercolor and pastel portraits created in Massachusetts in the 1840s signed as Mary B. Tucker.

== Life and career ==
Mary B. Tucker was born on January 8, 1824, in New London, Connecticut, the daughter of Rev. Thomas W. Tucker, an itinerant Methodist Episcopal preacher, and his wife Mary "Polly" Orne Tucker, a diarist whose work was posthumously published as Itinerant Preaching in the Early Days of Methodism, by a Pioneer Preacher’s Wife (1872).

The earliest signed portrait from Tucker dates to 1840. She created both profiles and full-face portraits in watercolor on large pieces of paper. They are signed but rarely identify the sitter. Most were created in various towns in Massachusetts as her family followed the Rev. Tucker from assignment to assignment. She also painted oil on canvas landscapes.

In 1847, she married Dr. David Sylvester Fogg and they had eight children. No portraits by her are dated after her marriage, though she continued to paint landscapes.

== Identity ==
For many years the identity of Mary B. Tucker was unknown and the subject of speculation. Charles Knowles Bolton suggested she was Mary Belcher Tucker Geyer (1807-1851). Arthur B. Kern proposed in 2009 that she was Meribah Mowry Tucker (1784–1853) based largely on the similarity of names. Michael R. Payne and Suzanne Rudnick Payne identified her as Mary Bagnall Tucker in 2019.
