= Hazel Tucker =

New Zealand social anthropologist (born 1965)

- Born: Hazel Mary Tucker; 1965 (age 60–61)
- Occupation: Social anthropologist

Academic background
- Education: Durham University
- Thesis: Living with tourism: Tourism, identity and change in a village in central Turkey (1999)

Hazel Mary Tucker (born 1965) is an English-born New Zealand social anthropologist. She is a Professor of Tourism at the University of Otago.

== Academic career ==
Tucker graduated from Durham University, England with a PhD in social anthropology in 1999. She moved to New Zealand in January 2000 to lecture at the University of Otago and was promoted to full professor there, with effect from 1 February 2019.

== Selected works ==
- Tucker, Hazel (2003), Living with tourism: Negotiating identities in a Turkish village, Routledge, ISBN 978-0-415-29856-8
- Hall, Colin Michael; Tucker, Hazel, eds. (2004), Tourism and postcolonialism: Contested discourses, identities and representations, Routledge, ISBN 978-0-415-33102-9
- Lynch, Paul; McIntosh, Alison J.; Tucker, Hazel, eds. (2009), Commercial homes in tourism: An international perspective, Routledge, ISBN 978-0-415-47018-6
