= James Tucker =

James Tucker may refer to:

== Politics ==
- Jim Guy Tucker (born 1943), former governor of Arkansas
- James Tucker (Canadian politician) (1857–1918), Ontario
- James N. Tucker Jr. (born 1934), New Brunswick politician
- James Roy Tucker (1909–1987), member of Canadian Parliament from Newfoundland

== Creative arts ==
- Jim Tucker (guitarist) (born 1946), member of The Turtles
- James Tucker (born 1929), Welsh novelist who wrote under the pseudonym Bill James
- James Tucker (convict) (1808–1888), early Australian author
- James Tucker (animator), American producer and director

== Others ==
- James Tucker, Baron Tucker (1888–1975), British judge
- Jim Tucker (basketball) (1932–2020), basketball player
- James Neil Tucker (1957–2004), murderer
- Jim Tucker (journalist) (1934–2013), American journalist
- Jim B. Tucker, psychiatrist and reincarnation researcher
- James Tucker (rugby union) (born 1994), New Zealand rugby union player
- James Tucker, co-pilot on FedEx Flight 705

== See also ==
- Jim Tucker (disambiguation)
