= Senator Tucker =

Senator Tucker may refer to:

- Clarke Tucker (born 1981), Arkansas State Senate
- Eugene A. Tucker (1856–1942), Nebraska State Senate
- Gregory Tucker (born 1957), West Virginia State Senate
- John Randolph Tucker (judge) (1854–1926), Virginia State Senate
- Joseph Tucker (Massachusetts politician) (1832–1907), Massachusetts State Senate
- Larry Tucker (politician) (1935–2016), West Virginia State Senate
- Luther C. Tucker (1911–1966), Florida State Senate
- Susan Tucker (politician) (1944–2023), Massachusetts State Senate
- Tommy Tucker (politician) (born 1950), North Carolina State Senate
- William H. Tucker (American politician) (1825–1866), Wisconsin State Senate
