= Thomas Tucker =

Thomas, Tommy or Tom Tucker may refer to:

== Music ==
- Tommy Tucker (bandleader) (1903–1989), big band leader in the 1930s
- Tommy Tucker (singer) (1933–1982), American blues singer and songwriter
- "Tommy Tucker", song by the band Bow Wow Wow

== Politics ==
- Thomas Tudor Tucker (1745–1828), Continental Congressman
  - SS Thomas T. Tucker
- Tommy Tucker (politician) (born 1950), state senator in the U.S. state of North Carolina

== Sports ==
- Tommy Tucker (baseball) (1863–1935), American first baseman
- Thomas Tucker (cricketer) (1796–1832), English cricketer associated with Cambridge University
- Tom Tucker (footballer) (1912–1982), Australian footballer for Collingwood
- T. J. Tucker (Thomas John Tucker), American baseball player

== Characters ==
- Little Tommy Tucker, nursery rhyme character
- Tom Tucker (Family Guy), a character on Family Guy
  - Tom Tucker: The Man and His Dream, an episode from the television series Family Guy, featuring the fictional news anchor Tom Tucker
- Tommy Tucker (squirrel), a tame touring squirrel

== Other ==
- Thomas DeSaille Tucker (fl. 1844–1903), first president of Florida A&M University
- Thomas George Tucker (1859–1946), Anglo-Australian academic, classicist, professor at the University of Melbourne
- Thomas W. Tucker (born 1945), American mathematician, Colgate University, topological graph theory
- Thomas Lowell Tucker (1981–2006), U.S. Army soldier who was killed in the Iraq War
- Thomas Tudor Tucker (Royal Navy officer) (1775–1852), British admiral
