= USS Tucker (DD-374) =

Mahan-class destroyer

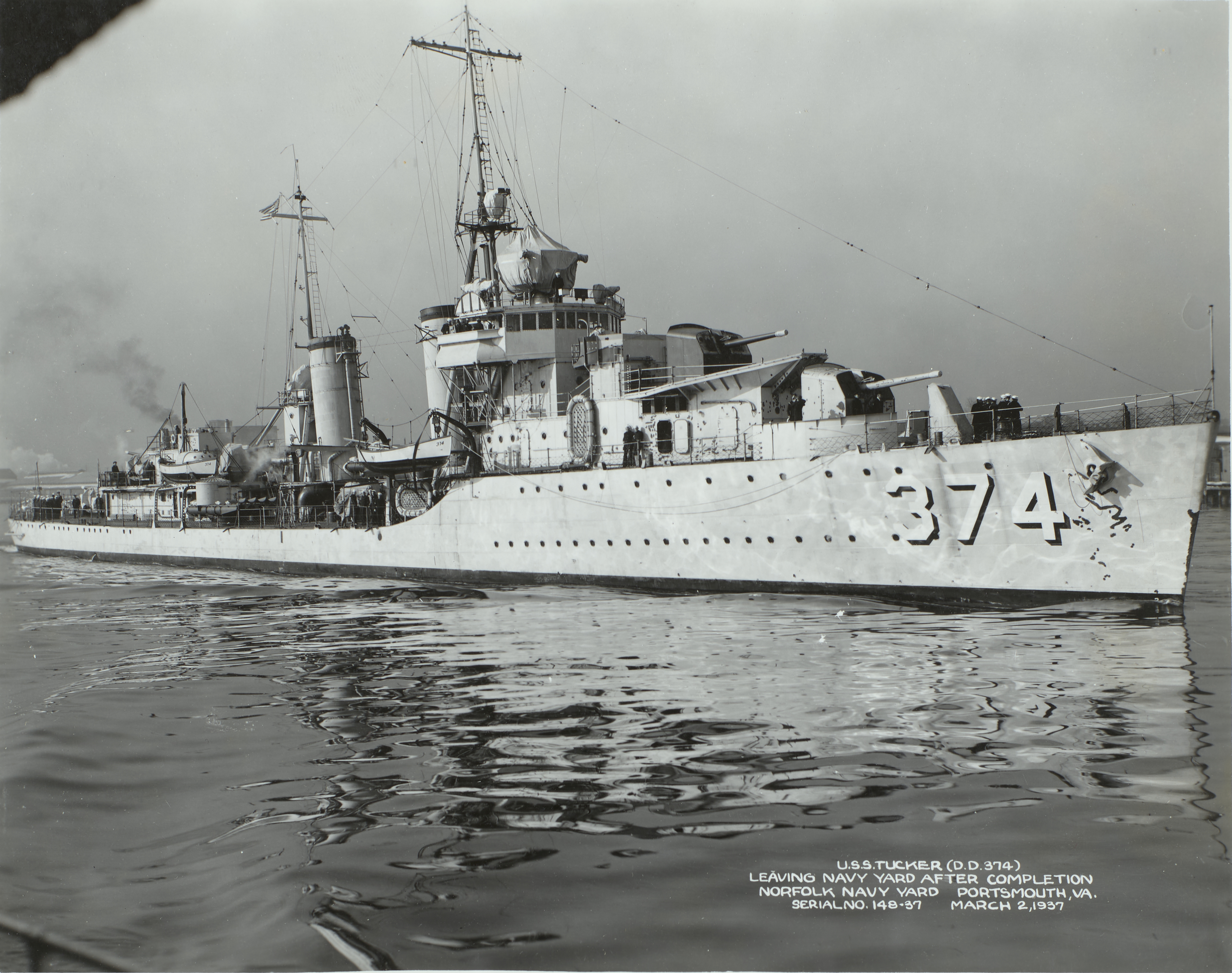
- USS Tucker off the Norfolk Navy Yard, Portsmouth, Virginia, 2 March 1937

History

United States
- Name: Tucker
- Namesake: Samuel Tucker
- Builder: Norfolk Navy Yard
- Laid down: 15 August 1934
- Launched: 26 February 1936
- Commissioned: 23 July 1936
- Stricken: 2 December 1944
- Fate: Struck mine off Espiritu Santo, New Hebrides, 4 August 1942

General characteristics (as built)
- Class & type: Mahan-class destroyer
- Displacement: 1,500 long tons (1,524 t) (standard load); 1,725 long tons (1,753 t) (deep load)
- Length: 341 ft (103.9 m)
- Beam: 35 ft 6 in (10.8 m)
- Draft: 10 ft 7 in (3.2 m)
- Installed power: 46,000 shaft horsepower (34,000 kW); 4 water-tube boilers
- Propulsion: 2 shafts 2 geared steam turbines
- Speed: 37 knots (69 km/h; 43 mph)
- Range: 6,940 nmi (12,850 km; 7,990 mi) at 12 knots (22 km/h; 14 mph)
- Complement: 158 officers and enlisted men
- Sensors & processing systems: 1 × gun director above bridge
- Armament: 5 × single 5 in (127 mm) DP guns; 3 × quadruple 21 in (533 mm) torpedo tubes; 4 × single .50 cal (12.7 mm) AA machine guns; 2 × depth charge stern racks; Depth charge projectors (aka K-guns)

USS Tucker (DD-374) was one of 18 Mahan-class destroyers built for the United States Navy and was commissioned in 1936. Tucker's main battery consisted of five dual-purpose 38 caliber 5-inch (127 mm) guns.

First assigned to the United States Battle Fleet in San Diego, California, Tucker operated along the West Coast and in the Hawaiian Islands. After participating in naval exercises in the Caribbean Sea, she returned to duty in Hawaii. She then went on a goodwill tour to New Zealand, returning to Hawaii and docking at Pearl Harbor. When the Japanese attacked Pearl Harbor on 7 December 1941, Tucker was undergoing an overhaul and was not attacked. Soon afterward, she began escorting convoys between the West Coast and Hawaii. Tucker was then tasked with escort duty to islands in the South Pacific.

Tucker steamed out of port on 1 August 1942, escorting a cargo ship to Espiritu Santo. They entered its harbor three days later, where the destroyer unknowingly entered a defensive minefield laid by the US Navy. Tucker struck at least one mine that tore her almost in two, sinking her and killing three sailors; the rest of the crew survived.

== Design ==
=== General characteristics ===
The Mahan-class destroyers were improved versions of the preceding Farragut class. The Mahans' standard displacement was 1,500 long tons (1,524 t) larger, and they were equipped with a more efficient steam propulsion system and designed to carry 12 torpedo tubes, an increase of four over the Farragut-class.

Tucker displaced 1,500 long tons (1,524 t) at standard load and 1,725 long tons (1,753 t) at deep load. The ship's overall length was 341 feet (103.9 m), her beam was 35 feet 6 inches (10.8 m), and her draft was 10 feet 7 inches (3.2 m). Her peace-time complement consisted of 158 officers and enlisted men.

She had a tripod foremast and a pole mainmast. To improve the antiaircraft field of fire, her tripod foremast was constructed without nautical rigging. The destroyer was fitted with emergency diesel generators, replacing the storage batteries of earlier destroyers. Gun crew shelters were also built fore and aft for the superimposed guns. A third set of quadruple torpedo tubes was added, with one mounted on the centerline and two in the side positions.

=== Machinery ===
Tucker was fitted with four water-tube boilers built by either Babcock & Wilcox or Foster Wheeler. They generated the steam that propelled the two General Electric geared steam turbines, developing 46,000 shp (34,000 kW) for a maximum speed of 37 knots (69 km/h; 43 mph). Tucker carried a maximum of 523 long tons (531 t) of fuel oil, with a trial range of 7,300 nautical miles (13,500 km; 8,400 mi) at 12 knots (22 km/h; 14 mph). The ship's wartime ranges were 6,940 nautical miles (12,850 km; 7,990 mi) at 12 knots (22 km/h; 14 mph) and 4,360 nautical miles (8,070 km; 5,020 mi) at 20 knots (37 km/h; 23 mph). The ship's design incorporated a new generation of propulsion machinery. The boilers were capable of reaching 650–700 °F (340–370 °C), powering the high-pressure turbines with double-reduction gears that enabled the turbines to run faster and more efficiently than in previous destroyer designs.

=== Armament ===
Tucker's main battery consisted of five dual-purpose 38 caliber 5-inch (127 mm) guns, equipped with the MK 33 gun fire-control system. The ship's antiaircraft battery had four water-cooled .50 caliber machine guns (12.7 mm). The ship was fitted with three quadruple torpedo-tube mounts for twelve 21-inch (533 mm) torpedoes, guided by the Mark 27 torpedo fire-control system. Those on the port and starboard sides could only fire to their side, but the centerline mount could fire to both sides. She was rigged for two depth charge roll-off racks and for depth charge projectors (K-guns). In early 1942, the Navy began to refit the Mahan-class destroyers with new antiaircraft armament, although most of the class was not refitted until sometime in 1944. (The source, Hodges and Friedman, do not indicate if Tucker was refitted).

== Construction and service history ==
Tucker was the second vessel to be named for Samuel Tucker, who had been an officer in the Continental Navy and the United States Navy. Tucker's keel was laid down on 15 August 1934. She was launched on 26 February 1936 and christened by a third cousin of Tucker. The ship was commissioned in the United States Navy on 23 July.

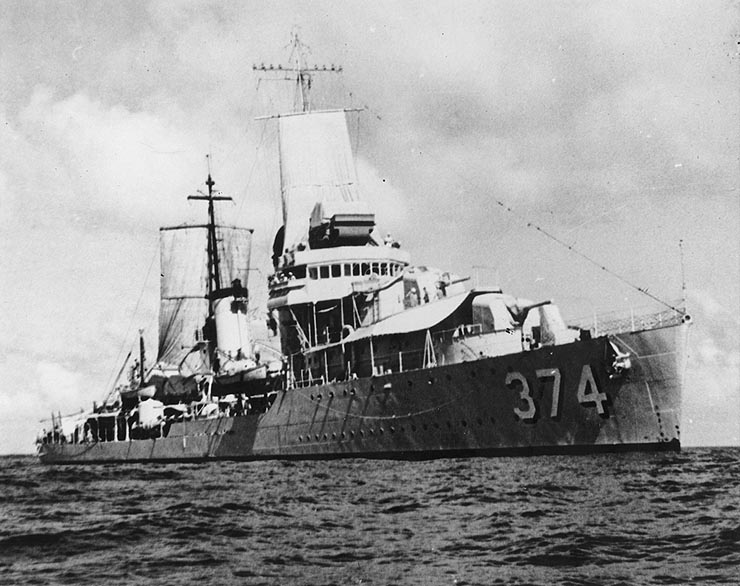
Tucker rigged with sails, June 1940

After her shakedown cruise, she joined destroyer forces attached to the United States Battle Fleet in San Diego, California. She operated with them along the West Coast and in the Hawaiian islands as part of Destroyer Squadron 3 of the Destroyer Division. In February 1939, she took part in Fleet Problem XX, a naval exercise held in the Caribbean Sea and Atlantic Ocean and observed by President Franklin D. Roosevelt. As tensions with Japan increased, the fleet was ordered to return to Hawaiian waters.

In June 1940, Tucker steamed from Hawaii to a location east of Wake Island for fleet exercises. In United States Navy Destroyers of World War II, John Reilly, Jr. described the uncommon method used to power the vessel on its return to Hawaii:

... Tucker stretched her fuel supply by rigging Sails. Her homemade foresail and mainsail moved Tucker at an estimated 3.4 knots, letting her maintain steerageway as she loitered on station several days.

Tucker continued operating between Hawaii and the West Coast into February 1941. She then set course for New Zealand on a goodwill tour, arriving in Auckland on 17 March. Returning to Pearl Harbor, she took part in routine exercises at sea before returning to her homeport of San Diego on 19 September. After a short stay, Tucker steamed to Hawaii in November as part of Task Force 19, operating again in the Hawaiian Islands. Shortly afterward, she put into Pearl Harbor for an overhaul by a destroyer tender.

When the Japanese attacked Pearl Harbor on 7 December 1941, Tucker was one of five destroyers moored at berth X–9, East Loch, alongside the destroyer tender Whitney. Even before Tucker's general quarters alarm could be sounded, one of her on-deck sailors began firing a 50-caliber machine gun at the first wave of Japanese aircraft. When the second wave attacked, every ship that could opened fire. Tucker's gunners scored hits on at least two aircraft: one crashed in a cane field, another in flames disappeared over a mountaintop. Still undergoing overhaul, much of Tucker’s machinery had been torn down for repairs. Despite the crew's efforts, she was unable to get underway until that evening.

After her overhaul, Tucker patrolled off Pearl Harbor and spent several months escorting convoys between Hawaii and the West Coast. With new orders, she steamed to the South Pacific for convoy duty. Tucker then escorted the seaplane tender Wright to Tutuila, American Samoa, as part of the drive to fortify outposts. She then escorted her charge to Suva, Fiji, and proceeded to Noumea, New Caledonia. Steaming on for Australia, she arrived at Sydney on 27 April. After taking on fuel, she visited Melbourne, Fremantle before steaming back to Sydney. Tucker and Wright returned to Suva, arriving on 3 June 1942. For the remainder of June and into the first week of July, Tucker operated out of Suva before relieving the cruiser Boise of convoy escort duties on 10 July. On 30 July, the ship arrived at Auckland and the following day started back for Suva.

== Fate ==
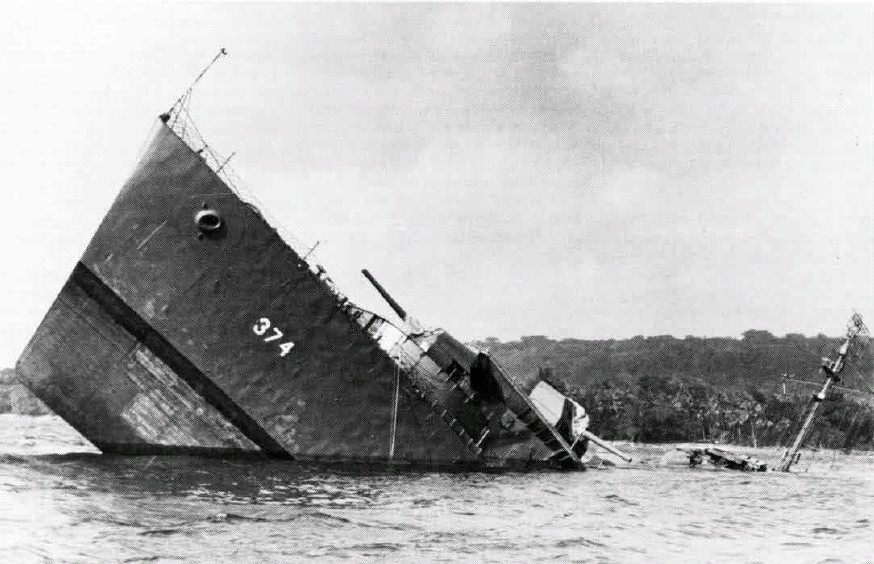
USS Tucker (D-374) sinking south of Espiritu Santo, 5 August 1942

On 1 August 1942 Tucker left Suva, escorting the cargo ship SS Nira Luckenbach to Espiritu Santo, New Hebrides. On 4 August Tucker led the cargo ship into the harbor at Espiritu Santo, as she headed into the western entrance, she struck at least one mine. The explosion tore her hull nearly in two at the No. 1 stack, killing all three crew members on watch in the forward fire room. The rest of the ship's company survived. Nira Luckenbach and other vessels rescued sailors from their sinking ship. Tucker's stern sank the following morning; a diving party scuttled and sank her bow. The ship had steamed into the Segond Channel unaware that the minelayers Gamble, Breese, and Tracy had laid mines at its western entrance. An investigation revealed that Tucker's captain had not been informed of the minefield. She was stricken from the Naval Vessel Register on 2 December 1944. Tucker's loss was a setback to the Pacific Fleet, which was trying to assemble every available ship for the Battle of Guadalcanal.

Three days after Tucker sank, the seagoing tugboat Navajo arrived on site with divers, salvaging her guns, turbines, anchors and chains. During the remainder of the war, the Navy used the wreckage site for diver training; they did not undertake further salvaging. Settling in just 60 feet (18 m) of water, the ship was easily accessible to private salvors, who harvested anything of value, ransacking and further scattering Tucker's remains. Sport divers also had a destructive effect on the site, which by 1997 resembled an "underwater junkyard". Mike Gerken, an underwater photojournalist, dove the Tucker wreckage site several times; in 2013 he eulogized Tucker and other sunken ships:

To see a ship with a distinguished record as the Tucker in such a poor state gave me pause for thought. I pondered that wrecks, like the Tucker, will gradually disappear and to be saddened by this inevitable fact would be pointless. What is important is that the memory of these ships be kept alive by telling their stories.

— Mike Gerken, "The USS Tucker: A Prestigious Past with an Inglorious End", Wreck Diving Magazine

Tucker and SS President Coolidge, a troopship, suffered similar fates less than three months apart; both were sunk in different locations of the same U.S. Navy minefield, and both later became diving sites.

== Honors ==
Tucker received one battle star for her World War II service.
