= Joseph Tucker (cricketer) =

English cricketer

Personal information
- Full name: Joseph Peter Tucker
- Born: 14 September 1979 (age 47); Bath, Somerset
- Batting: Right-handed
- Bowling: Right-arm medium-fast

Domestic team information
- Years: Team
- 2000–1: Somerset
- First-class debut: 23 August 2000 Somerset v West Indians
- Last First-class: 20 April 2001 Somerset v Lancashire

Career statistics
Competition	First-class
Matches	2
Runs scored	19
Batting average	19.00
100s/50s	0/0
Top score	14
Balls bowled	168
Wickets	1
Bowling average	129.00
5 wickets in innings	0
10 wickets in match	0
Best bowling	1/28
Catches/stumpings	1/–
- Source: ESPNcricinfo, 31 December 2014

Joseph Peter Tucker (born 14 September 1979) played two first-class cricket matches for Somerset in 2000 and 2001. A right-arm medium-fast bowler, he only took one wicket in first-class cricket, that of Brian Lara, before a back injury forced him out of the game.

== Life and career ==
Joseph Tucker was born in Bath on 14 September 1979. He made his first appearance for Somerset's second team at the age of 15, in a heavy defeat against Kent. He represented England Under-17s in the 1997 International Youth Tournament, taking seven wickets, and two years later toured New Zealand with the England Under-19 cricket team. During the tour, he played all three Test matches, taking 10 wickets at an average of 17.10. Tucker made his debut in first-class cricket in 2000, appearing for Somerset against the touring West Indians. During that match, he took the wicket of Brian Lara, his only wicket in first-class cricket. The following season, he made his second, and final, first-class appearance, playing against Lancashire in the County Championship. He continued to appear for Somerset's second team until 2004, although his playing contract was cancelled at the end of the 2002 season due to a recurring back injury.
