= Jerry Tucker (labor leader) =

Jerry Tucker (1939 - October 19, 2012) was an American labor leader and educator associated with the United Auto Workers (UAW). He led the UAW's campaign to defeat right-to-work in Missouri in 1978, and was a leader of the UAW rank-and-file caucus fighting for union democracy known as New Directions.

A month before the 1986 UAW convention, Tucker announced his intention to challenge incumbent Region 5 regional director Kenneth Worley and was fired from his job as assistant regional director. Tucker lost the election, at which delegates had votes proportional to the size of their constituency, by 0.16 votes out of about 650 votes cast. However, Tucker argued that some delegates had been improperly elected, and the Department of Labor ordered a new election in 1988, which Tucker won with 52% of the vote. He was one of the first members of the UAW's governing executive board in decades not to be part of the dominant Administration Caucus.
