= Dave Tucker (rugby league) =

English rugby league footballer

Playing information
Club
Years	Team	Pld	T	G	FG	P
1964–65/66	Featherstone Rovers	17+3	1	0	0	3

Dave Tucker is a former professional rugby league footballer who played in the 1960s. He played at club level for Featherstone Rovers.

== Club career ==
Dave Tucker made his debut for Featherstone Rovers on Saturday 15 February 1964.
