= Benjamin Tucker (disambiguation) =

Benjamin Tucker (1854–1939) was an American anarchist.

Benjamin Tucker may also refer to:

- Benjamin B. Tucker (born 1951), American police officer
- Benjamin Tucker (civil servant) (1762–1829), English civil servant

== See also ==
- Ben Tucker (1930–2013), American bassist
