= Don M. Tucker =

American neuropsychologist

Don M. Tucker is an American cognitive neuroscientist, neuropsychologist, professor emeritus of Psychology and Director of the Neuroinformatics Center at the University of Oregon. In 2018, Tucker was named a Fellow of the National Academy of Inventors, becoming the first faculty member from the University of Oregon to receive the honour. He is known for pioneering dense-array electroencephalography. He has conducted research on the measurement of brain dynamics and its relation to neuroscience and artificial intelligence.

== Education and career ==
Tucker received his doctoral training in psychology and neuroscience and joined the faculty at the University of Oregon in 1984. He held various academic positions, including Professor of Psychology and Associate Director of the NeuroInformatics Center. He later became Emeritus Professor while continuing research and entrepreneurship activities. In 1992, he founded Electrical Geodesics, Inc. (EGI) in Eugene, Oregon, and later, in 2018, the Brain Electrophysiology Laboratory (BEL) Company, where he currently serves as CEO and Chief Scientist.

In the late 1980s, Tucker proposed that accurate source localization of brain activity required hundreds of scalp sensors. He developed the Geodesic Sensor Net, a hydrogel-based EEG cap capable of recording from 128–256 channels with rapid application and without scalp abrasion. This technology was commercialized through EGI, which was later acquired by Philips Healthcare in 2017 for $36.7 million.

Tucker also established the BEL Company in 2018 to extend dense-array EEG to therapeutic applications, including FDA-cleared neuromodulation devices and cloud-based source imaging software.

== Research ==
Tucker's research integrates cognitive psychology, electrophysiology, and neuroinformatics to understand the neural basis of emotion, memory, attention, and mental illness. He has investigated frontal-limbic asymmetries, anxiety, and depression using high-density EEG and source localization methods.

More recently, in collaboration with Phan Luu, Tucker proposed the Personal Neuromorphic Emulation (PNE) framework, a vision for brain-AI fusion by integrating structural MRI, dense-array EEG, and active inference learning rules to model individual cognition.

== Selected publications ==
=== Books ===
- Johnson, Mark; Tucker, Don M. (2021). Out of the cave: a natural philosophy of mind and knowing. Cambridge, Massachusetts: The MIT Press. ISBN 978-0262046213. Co-authored with philosopher Mark Johnson, presenting a theory of knowing as embodied, embedded, enactive, and emotionally based.

=== Journal articles ===
- Holmes, Mark D.; Feng, Rui; Wise, Mackenzie V.; Ma, Chengxin; Ramon, Ceon; Wu, Jinsong; Luu, Phan; Hou, Jidong; Pan, Li; Tucker, Don M. (2019-11-11). "Safety of slow-pulsed transcranial electrical stimulation in acute spike suppression". Annals of Clinical and Translational Neurology. 6 (12): 2579–2585. doi:10.1002/acn3.50934. ISSN 2328-9503. PMC 6917336. PMID 31709777.
- Fernández-Corazza, Mariano; Turovets, Sergei; Luu, Phan; Price, Nick; Muravchik, Carlos Horacio; Tucker, Don (2018). "Skull Modeling Effects in Conductivity Estimates Using Parametric Electrical Impedance Tomography". IEEE Transactions on Biomedical Engineering. 65 (8): 1785–1797. doi:10.1109/tbme.2017.2777143. hdl:11336/49923. ISSN 0018-9294. PMID 29989921.
- Ramon, Ceon; Holmes, Mark D.; Wise, Mackenzie V.; Tucker, Don; Jenson, Kevin; Kinn, Samuel R. (2018-11-21). "Oscillatory Patterns of Phase Cone Formations near to Epileptic Spikes Derived from 256-Channel Scalp EEG Data". Computational and Mathematical Methods in Medicine. 2018: 1–15. doi:10.1155/2018/9034543. ISSN 1748-670X. PMC 6343174. PMID 30728850.
- Tucker, Don M.; Luu, Phan; Johnson, Mark (2022-08-30). "Neurophysiological Mechanisms of Implicit and Explicit Memory in the Process of Consciousness". Journal of Neurophysiology. 128 (4): 872–891. doi:10.1152/jn.00328.2022. PMC 9576178. PMID 36044682.
- Tucker, Don M. (1981). "Lateral brain function, emotion, and conceptualization". Psychological Bulletin. 89 (1): 19–46. doi:10.1037/0033-2909.89.1.19. ISSN 1939-1455. PMID 7232611.
- Tucker, Don M. (2007-07-01), "Objective Experience", Mind from Body, Oxford University Press, pp. 254–280, doi:10.1093/acprof:oso/9780195316988.003.0008, ISBN 978-0-19-531698-8
- Tucker, Don; Luu, Phan (2012-10-23). Cognition and Neural Development. Oxford University Press. doi:10.1093/acprof:oso/9780199838523.001.0001. ISBN 978-0-19-983852-3.
- Johnson, Mark L.; Tucker, Don M. (2021-08-17). Out of the Cave. The MIT Press. doi:10.7551/mitpress/14016.001.0001. ISBN 978-0-262-36723-3.
- Tucker, Don M.; Williamson, Peter A. (1984). "Asymmetric neural control systems in human self-regulation". Psychological Review. 91 (2): 185–215. doi:10.1037/0033-295X.91.2.185. ISSN 1939-1471.
- Tucker, Don M.; Dawson, Steven L.; Roth, David L.; Penland, James G. (1985). "Regional changes in EEG power and coherence during cognition: Intensive study of two individuals". Behavioral Neuroscience. 99 (3): 564–577. doi:10.1037/0735-7044.99.3.564. ISSN 1939-0084.
- Tucker, Don M.; Williamson, Peter A. (1984). "Asymmetric neural control systems in human self-regulation". Psychological Review. 91 (2): 185–215. doi:10.1037/0033-295X.91.2.185. ISSN 1939-1471.
