= Henry Tucker (Sherbro) =

Henry Tucker was the most powerful merchant in Sherbro, Sierra Leone in the eighteenth century.

He was one of the Sherbro Tuckers and ruled at Bahol.
