= Sean Tucker =

Sean Tucker may refer to:

- Sean Tucker (American football) (born 2001), American football player
- Sean D. Tucker (born 1952), American aerobatic aviator
