= Sarah Tucker =

Sarah Tucker may refer to:

- Sarah Tucker (diplomat), English diplomat, governor of Montserrat
- Sarah Tucker (model), Sierra Leonean model and beauty pageant titleholder

== See also ==
- Sarah Tucker College, an institution in Palayamkottai, Tamil Nadu, India
- Sara Tucker, American chief executive officer of the National Math and Science Initiative
