= Tony Tucker (American football) =

American football player (born 1989)

Tony Jaye "TJ" Tucker Jr.
- Tucker DE #90 playing for Pitt

Profile
- Position: Defensive end

Personal information
- Born: February 18, 1989 (age 37); Maryland, U.S.
- Listed height: 6 ft 3 in (1.91 m)

Career information
- High school: St. John's College HS (Washington, D.C.)
- College: Pittsburgh
- NFL draft: 2011

Career history
- University of Pittsburgh, Prairie View Panthers of Texas (2010, 2011); Lehigh Valley Steelhawks; Cedar Rapid Titans (end of 2012); Washington Warriors (2015); Rivals Professional League (2017)

Tony J. Tucker Jr. (born February 18, 1989) is an American former defensive end football player.

== Early life ==
Tony (TJ) Tucker Jr. has played the game of football all his life. He set his goal at a very young age to make it to the NFL by charting all his goals on poster board. He began playing football at the young age of 6 for the youth Boys and Girls Club the Falcons of Hyattsville and the Bowie Bulldogs, both teams out of Maryland. He always had to play with older kids out of his age range due to his huge size.

While at St. John's College High School, Tony played as a two-year, two-way starter at defensive end and tight end. Tony worked hard to achieve his charted poster-board goals. Under the coaching leadership of Joe Patterson, he became one of the most heavily recruited prospects in the Washington, D.C. area. Tony was selected in the Washington Catholic Athletic Conference (WCAC) All League. Other noted honors include the Washington Post All-Metropolitan First Team. Tony was honored with the highest football award, the Mush Dobofsky Award, at St. John's College High School.

Regarded as a four-star recruit by Rivals.com, Tucker was rated as the District of Columbia's No. 3 prospect and the nation's No. 11 weak-side defensive end. Tucker was rated the nation's No. 24 defensive end by Scout.com. Tucker was rated the No. 8 prospect by sports magazine Super Prep in 2007. He made the George Michael Golden 11.

In 2007, Tony was highly recruited from the DC Metropolitan area by over 35 college teams, including such schools as Virginia Tech, Georgia Tech, Clemson, Ohio, and North Carolina. Following his high school career, Tucker participated in the 2007 East-West All American Game.

== University of Pittsburgh career ==
National-caliber defensive end announced his commitment to Pitt on January 6 at the all-star game via ESPNU...legendary Pitt defensive end Hugh Green (1977–80) was an East assistant coach.

2007: One of the most heavily recruited players in the Washington D.C. area in defensive lineman Tony Tucker, who earned PrepStar College Recruiting All-America honors. Tucker was red-shirted by Coach Dave Wannstedt on his freshman year at Pitt. The following year, Tony was slowly rotated into the game with his teammate Jabaal Sheard. Tucker helped his team by making key plays that brought major wins.

Speedy defensive end who will be a significant member of Pitt's defensive line rotation... lettered last year in a reserve role...very effective with his hands and could emerge as one of the Panthers' top pass rushers

— Scout reporter

2008: During the upset of Pitt over Iowa, Coach Wannstedt played Tucker in each game as a top reserve at defensive end. Tony had four tackles, one sack and one forced fumble on the year. Tucker was noted for helping to clinch the Iowa victory with a pair of key plays on Iowa's final possession. He had a two-yard sack and then, on the next play, forced a fumble that was recovered by teammate Greg Romeus with 50 seconds left. Tucker was placed on the 2008 Big East All-Freshmen team

In 2009, Tucker was hit hard by the decision of leaving his highly respected Pitt team as the news of his mother's car accident. Tony was faced with no other option but to leave the University of Pittsburgh. Tony left Pitt to help take care of his mother. Shortly afterwards, Tony made attempts to attend the University of Maryland at his father's request, but academic requirements were not completely met and Tony was not allowed to play. Tucker then attend Prairie View A&M University.

== Professional career ==
In 2011, the 2011 NFL lockout blocked Tucker's entrance into the NFL. During the draft process the New Orleans Saints, Green Bay Packers, and Philadelphia Eagles expressed interest up until the NFL lockout. Tucker was soon made an offer to play indoor football for the Lehigh Valley Steelhawks and the Cedar Rapids Titans. He continued his education as a student studying criminal justice at Kirkwood Community College.
