= William Tucker =

William, Will, Willie, Bill, or Billy Tucker may refer to:

== Arts and entertainment ==
- William Ellis Tucker (died 1832), American porcelain craftsman
- William G. Tucker (born 1935), British modernist sculptor
- William Tucker (musician) (1961–1999), American guitarist

== Religion ==
- William Tooker or Tucker (1557/58–1621), English churchman
- William Jewett Tucker (1839–1926), American congregationalist minister, president of Dartmouth College
- William Tucker (priest) (1856–1934), Anglican archdeacon and dean

== Sports ==
=== Rugby ===
- William Eldon Tucker (1872–1953), England international rugby union player
- Bill Tucker (rugby union) (1903–1991), England international rugby union player
- Will Tucker (born 1998), New Zealand rugby union player

=== Other sports ===
- William H. Tucker (baseball) (1819–1894), American baseball pioneer
- Willie Tucker (1872–1954), American professional golfer
- Bill Tucker (American football) (1942–2015), American football player
- Billy Tucker (born 1948), English professional footballer

== Others ==
- William Tucker (Jamestown immigrant) (1588–1643/44), English colonist in Jamestown, Virginia
- William Tucker (Virginia colony) (1624–?), African American colonist in Jamestown, Virginia
- William Tucker (settler) (1784–1817), British convict, sealer, trader in human heads, and art dealer
- William H. Tucker (American politician) (1825–1866), American politician in Wisconsin
- William F. Tucker (1827–1881), Confederate States Army brigadier general
- William Tucker (politician) (1843–1919), member of the New Zealand Legislative Council
- William Sansome Tucker (1877–1955), English physicist and acoustical pioneer
- William H. Tucker (psychologist) (born 1940), American professor of psychology
