= Joseph Schuster (vaudeville) =

Joseph Schuster (1896 - June 10, 1959) was an American composer and music publisher. He was also a vaudeville and radio performer. With John A. Tucker, he was part of the team of Schuster and Tucker. He collaborated on songs with Rudy Vallée and Ruth Etting.

== Biography ==
He was born in 1896 to Sarah and Morris Schuster. His father was from Germany and his mother from England. He had a brother, Ira Schuster.

He was on the radio between 1928 and 1935 as Schuster and Tucker. Their songs included "Dance of the Paper Dolls", and "Don't Shoot the Bartender, He's Half Shot Now".

In 1959 he appeared on Memory Lane with his former partner Tucker. He died on June 10, 1959, at Trafalgar Hospital from an intestinal hernia.

== Songs ==
- Mama's Little Baby with John A. Tucker
- Look at Me Now with John A. Tucker
- I Kissed a Girl and Made Her Cry with Jack Val
- Home Is Where the Heart Is
