= Barbara Tucker (disambiguation) =

Barbara Tucker (born 1967) is an American house and soul singer, songwriter and choreographer.

Barbara Tucker may also refer to:

- Barbara Grace Tucker, Australian born peace activist
- Barbara Johnson Tucker (born 1944), American Christian music recording artist
- Barbara Mae Tucker (1960–1980), American woman kidnapped, sexually assaulted, and murdered in Gresham, Oregon
