= Toccata and Fugue =

Toccata and Fugue may refer to several classical compositions attributed to Johann Sebastian Bach:

- Toccata and Fugue in D minor, BWV 565 – the best known "Toccata and Fugue", for organ
- Toccata and Fugue in D minor, BWV 538 a.k.a. Dorian, for organ
- Toccata and Fugue in F major, BWV 540 – for organ
- Prelude (Toccata) and Fugue in E major, BWV 566 – for organ
- Toccata, Adagio and Fugue in C major, BWV 564 – for organ

== See also ==
- List of compositions by Johann Sebastian Bach for more works called "Toccata and Fugue"
- Prelude and fugue, including a list of works
- Fantasia and Fugue (disambiguation)
