= Ethelyn Maria Tucker =

America botanist, librarian and author (1871–1959)

- Born: December 3, 1871; Hardwick, Massachusetts, U.S.
- Died: August 23, 1959 (aged 87)
- Known for: Catalogue of the Library of the Arnold Arboretum of Harvard University (Vol. II)
- Scientific career
- Fields: botany

Ethelyn Dahleatte Maria Tucker (December 3, 1871, in Hardwick, Massachusetts – August 23, 1959) was an American botanist, author, and librarian at Harvard University's Arnold Arboretum in Boston, Massachusetts.

== Written works ==
Tucker, Ethelyn Maria (1917). Catalogue of the Library of the Arnold Arboretum of Harvard University (Vol. II). Cosmos Press.
