= Margaret A. Tucker =

American oncologist and physician-scientist

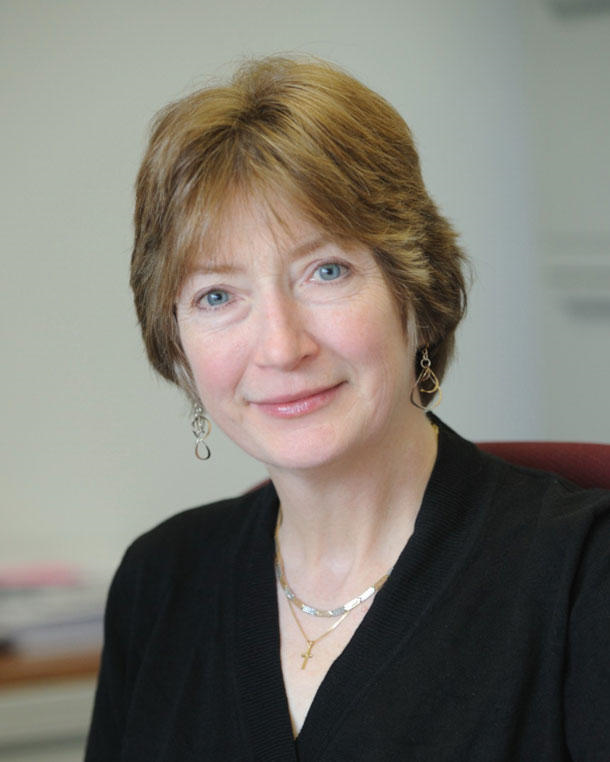
- Education: Wellesley College; Harvard Medical School
- Awards: Public Health Service Distinguished Service Medal
- Scientific career
- Fields: Oncology, genetic epidemiology
- Workplaces: National Cancer Institute

Margaret Anne Tucker, M.D., is an American oncologist and physician-scientist specialized in environmental and genetic epidemiology, familial cancers, and melanomas. She is a scientist emerita at the National Cancer Institute (NCI). Tucker was a commissioned officer in the United States Public Health Service Commissioned Corps and served as director of the NCI human genetics program from 2005 until her retirement in June 2018.

== Life ==
Margaret A. Tucker receiver her bachelor's degree at Wellesley College. She earned her M.D. from the Harvard Medical School and completed training in internal medicine and medical oncology at Stanford University Medical Center.

Tucker joined the National Institutes of Health (NIH) in 1978 as a commissioned officer in the United States Public Health Service Commissioned Corps (PHSCC). She served as chief of the family studies section of the environmental epidemiology branch from 1987 to 1992, chief of the genetic epidemiology branch (GEB) from 1992 to 2011, and director of the human genetics program from 2005 until her retirement in June 2018.

== Research & Contributions ==
Tucker was the acting director of the division of cancer epidemiology and genetics DCEG between 2012 and 2013. She is a recipient of a Public Health Service Distinguished Service Medal. During her tenure at the National Cancer Institute (NCI), Tucker led the Institute’s research program on familial cancers. Tucker's scientific contributions have improved our understanding of the mechanisms underlying familial cancers, the etiology of melanoma, and predisposition to multiple malignancies. Her research team and collaborators identified the first major susceptibility genes for melanoma. Tucker and her team published a melanoma atlas, created training videos for the clinical examination of members of high-risk families, developed the first calculator to estimate an individual’s risk of developing melanoma. Tucker and her research team also developed a website that aims to aid patients in identifying differences between melanoma, Dysplastic Nevi, and moles. Tucker retired in June 2018 and was named as a scientist emerita by the National Institutes of Health (NIH) scientific directors. Tucker was also involved with the Programmatic Panel on Melanoma directed by the Congressionally Directed Medical Research Programs in 2019.
