= Walter Tucker =

Walter Tucker may refer to:

- Walter R. Tucker Jr. (1924–1990), mayor of Compton, California
- Walter R. Tucker III (born 1957), United States representative for California
- Walter Tucker (Canadian politician) (1899–1990), Saskatchewan politician
- Walter E. Tucker, American politician and state legislator in Pennsylvania
- Walter Tucker (Church of the Universe) (died 2012), established Church of the Universe
