= Robert Tucker =

Robert or Bob Tucker may refer to:

- Robert B. Tucker (1937–2023), American CEO of Shoe Show
- Robert C. Tucker (1918–2010), American political scientist and historian
- Robert W. Tucker (1924–2025), American writer and teacher
- Robert Tucker (boat designer) (died 1998), British sailor and boat designer
- Robert Tucker (mathematician) (1832–1905), English mathematician
- Robert Tucker (horse trainer) (1857–1910), Kentucky Derby winning trainer
- Robert S. Tucker (born 1970), American businessman and philanthropist
- Robert Tucker (burgess 1753) (died 1767), member of the House of Burgesses, Virginia
- Wilson Tucker (writer) (1914–2006), known as Bob, American theater technician and novelist
- Bob Tucker (American football) (born 1945), American football player
- Bob Tucker (coach) (1943–2017), American football player and coach
