= Alexander Tucker =

Alexander Tucker may refer to:

- Alexander Tucker (civil servant), administrator in British India
- Alexander Tucker (musician), English musician
- Alexander Tucker & The Decomposed Orchestra from Haldern Pop
