= Sam Tucker =

England international rugby union player

- Born: John Samuel Tucker; 1 June 1895 Bristol, England
- Died: 4 January 1973 (aged 77) (registered in) Bristol

Rugby union career
- Position: Hooker
International career
Years	Team	Apps	(Points)
1922–1931	England	27	(Pts:6; Tries:2; Conv:0; Pens:0; Drop:0)

Sam Tucker (1895–1973) was a rugby union international who represented England from 1922 to 1931. He also captained his country.

== Early life ==
Sam Tucker was born on 1 June 1895 in Bristol.

== Rugby union career ==
Tucker made his international debut on 21 January 1922 at Cardiff Arms Park in the Wales v England match. Of the 27 matches he played for his national side, he was on the winning side on 14 occasions. He played his final match for England on 17 January 1931 at Twickenham in the England v Wales match. In 1930, he became the first rugby union player to take a flight to play in an international match. He received a late call-up for the game against Wales in Cardiff and took a flight from Bristol aerodrome to reach the ground in time.

== Personal life ==
He married and had two children, Mary, who was born in 1926, and Janet.
