= Spencer Tucker (cricketer) =

New Zealand cricketer (1865–1948)

Spencer Jacob Tucker was born 1865 in Christchurch and died 8 July 1948 in Wellington. He was a New Zealand cricketer who played for the Wellington Firebirds in the 1890s. He was the brother of William Tucker and Kinder Tucker who played 40 games for Wellington from 1895 to 1920.
