= Attorney General Tucker =

Attorney General Tucker may refer to:

- John Randolph Tucker (politician) (1823–1897), Attorney General of Virginia
- Jim Guy Tucker (born 1943), Attorney General of Arkansas
