= Edward R. Dudley (state legislator) =

North Carolina politician (b. 1840, d. 1913)

Edward Richard Dudley (June 10, 1840 - 1913) was a state legislator in North Carolina. He represented Craven County in the North Carolina House of Representatives in 1870 and 1872. He lived in New Bern. He was one of several African American state legislators who represented the area during the Reconstruction era.

== Early life ==
Edward Richard Dudley was born on June 10, 1840 in New Bern, North Carolina. His father was a free man while mother was enslaved. His father attempted to purchase her freedom but could not legally emancipate her under state law, so she and Edward were sold to R. N. Taylor of New Bern. He was educated by his mother.

Dudley remained enslaved until New Bern was captured by federal troops during the American Civil War. He began working as a cooper.

== Political career ==
Dudley grew involved in New Bern public affairs in 1865. He served on the city council in 1869. He represented Craven County in the North Carolina House of Representatives in 1870 and 1872. He was a beneficiary of federal Republican patronage and for a time served as a deputy collector of revenue of New Bern.

He attended the first North Carolina Colored Fair in Raleigh in 1879.

Dudley opposed James O'Hara's nomination for the Republican Party in North Carolina's 2nd congressional district, and supported his friend, Orlando Hubbs, in 1882. This was due to both personal loyalty to Hubbs, and opposition to O'Hara's anti-prohibition stance.

In the 1886 elections, Dudley served on the committee of a county coalition of Republicans and Democrats that supported a mixed slate of candidates from both parties to advance Craven's interests. Dudley again opposed James E. O'Hara's re-election to North Carolina's 2nd congressional district in 1886, and supported Democrat Furnifold Simmons. During the Fusionist era in the elections of 1896, he was elected to a local school committee in Craven County.

== Later life ==
Dudley died at his home in New Bern on May 18, 1913. A funeral was held two days later at Ebenezer Presbyterian Church.

== See also ==
- African American officeholders from the end of the Civil War until before 1900
- List of first African-American U.S. state legislators

== Works cited ==
- Anderson, Eric (1980). Race and Politics in North Carolina, 1872–1901: The Black Second. Baton Rouge: Louisiana State University Press. ISBN 9780807107843 – via Google Books.
- Balanoff, Elizabeth (January 1972). "Negro Legislators in the North Carolina General Assembly, July, 1868-February, 1872". The North Carolina Historical Review. 49 (1): 22–55. JSTOR 23529002.
- Gilmore, Glenda Elizabeth (2019). Gender and Jim Crow : Women and the Politics of White Supremacy in North Carolina, 1896-1920 (second ed.). Chapel Hill: University of North Carolina Press. ISBN 9781469652030.
- Justesen, Benjamin R. (2012). George Henry White: An Even Chance in the Race of Life (reprint ed.). Baton Rouge: Louisiana State University Press. ISBN 9780807144770.
- Watson, Alan D. (1987). A History of New Bern and Craven County. New Bern: Tryon Palace Commission. OCLC 17398679.
