= Charles E. Tucker Jr. =

United States Air Force general

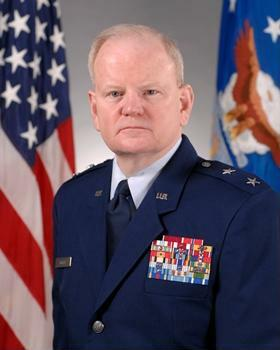
- U.S. Air Force Photo
- Military career
- Branch: United States Air Force
- Service years: 1982–2009
- Rank: Major General
- Nickname: Chuck
- Unit: National Guard Bureau
- Commands: Director, Joint Doctrine, Training and Force Development (J-7) of the National Guard; Chief of Staff, Wisconsin Air National Guard; and Headquarters Staff Judge Advocate, Wisconsin Air National Guard
- Conflicts: Operation Provide Comfort; Operation Northern Watch; Yugoslav Wars; Operation Deny Flight; Implementation Force (IFOR); Stabilisation Force (SFOR); Kosovo Force (KFOR); War in Afghanistan; Operation Enduring Freedom; Iraq War
- Awards: Legion of Merit (2); Bronze Star; Defense Meritorious Service Medal; Meritorious Service Medal (2); Air Force Commendation Medal (4)
- Other work: Executive Director, World Engagement Institute

Charles Edward Tucker Jr. is a retired major general in the United States Air Force. He currently serves as the Co-Founder and Executive Director of two International Non-Governmental Organizations (INGOs): the World Engagement Institute, Chicago, IL, USA; and the Sustainable Capacity International Institute, Arezzo, Italy. In these capacities, he develops and promotes the fundamental rights of peoples around the world through education, research, documentation, capacity building and advocacy. He also engages in post-conflict justice capacity building programs and large-scale human rights documentation projects throughout the world. Tucker has also served, since October, 2019, as Interim General Manager of Lyric Opera of Chicago.

In addition to his other positions, Tucker currently serves as the international projects director for the National Strategy Forum, a non-partisan training institute and think-tank located in Chicago. He likewise serves on the board of directors of the International Code of Conduct for Private Security Service Providers' Association (ICoCA), Geneva, Switzerland, where, as the U.S. Government representative to the 12-member Board, he is charged with promoting, governing and overseeing the implementation of the International Code of Conduct for Private Security Service Providers to promote the responsible provision of private security services and respect for human rights and national and international law by exercising independent governance and oversight of the ICoC.

In his civilian capacity, Tucker has served as director of programs management for the International Development Law Organization (IDLO), an intergovernmental rule of law development organization based in Rome, Italy, and as Executive Director of the International Human Rights Law Institute (IHRLI) of DePaul University College of Law. He has also served as a Senior Field Attorney for the National Labor Relations Board (NLRB).

Raised in Naperville, Illinois, General Tucker graduated with a bachelor's degree from the University of Notre Dame in 1979 and earned a Juris Doctor from the DePaul University College of Law in 1982. He has held faculty positions at the United States Air Force Academy, the University of Colorado, the University of Maryland, DePaul University College of Law, Bradley University, Vernon College, and Wayland Baptist College. He has also lectured extensively as a Visiting Professor, including at the Vietnam National University (Đại học Quốc gia Hà Nội); the Universität Heidelberg (Germany); the Max Planck Institute for Comparative Public Law and International Law (Germany); the University of Zagreb (Sveučilištu u Zagrebu, Croatia), the University of Sarajevo (Univerziteta u Sarajevu, Bosnia and Herzegovina); the Middle East Technical University (Orta Doğu Teknik Üniversitesi, Turkey), Ankara University (Turkey), the University of Sulaimani (جامعة السليمانية, Sulaymaniyah, Iraq), and University of Duhok (جامعة دهوك, Duhok, Iraq). He currently serves as the Co-Course Director of the United Nations' Annual International Humanitarian Law Symposium and Co-Course Director for the Annual International Course on "Crime Prevention Through Criminal Law & Security Studies, Dubrovnik, Croatia.

== Military career ==
Charles Tucker joined the United States Air Force in 1979 and served in the Judge Advocate General's Corps. His duties have included assignments in Germany and Turkey and faculty positions at the United States Air Force Academy. Tucker transferred to the United States Air Force Reserve in 1992 and to the Wisconsin Air National Guard in 1993. Later assignments included serving seconded duty as the Legal and Economic Advisor for the High Representative for Bosnia and Herzegovina, Bosnia and Herzegovina, Military Legal Advisor for the United States Ambassador to Iraq, Senior Legal Advisor for the General Counsel of the Department of Defense, Office of the Secretary of Defense (OSD), and Senior Legal Advisor for United Nations Training Assistance Teams (UNTAT) in Central Asia. In 2001, he was named the Air National Guard's Outstanding Judge Advocate (Lawyer) of the year.

Immediately prior to his military retirement in 2009, General Tucker served on the joint staff of the National Guard Bureau as the Director of Doctrine, Training and Force Development. In this capacity, he was responsible for developing training and exercise policies and programs to ensure joint units of the National Guard are ready to respond to their homeland defense and homeland security missions. He also formulated National Guard Joint Professional Military Education policy, and coordinates periodic review of all Joint Professional Military Education curricula. His retirement was effective as of January 30, 2009.

Awards he has received include the Legion of Merit with oak leaf cluster, the Bronze Star Medal, the Defense Meritorious Service Medal, the Meritorious Service Medal with oak leaf cluster, the Air Force Commendation Medal with three oak leaf clusters, the Joint Meritorious Unit Award with oak leaf cluster, the Air Force Outstanding Unit Award with silver oak leaf cluster and two bronze oak leaf clusters, the Air Force Organizational Excellence Award with oak leaf cluster, the Kosovo Campaign Medal with service star, the Iraq Campaign Medal, the Global War on Terrorism Service Medal, the Armed Forces Service Medal with two oak leaf clusters, the Overseas Service Ribbon with three oak leaf clusters, the Air Force Expeditionary Service Ribbon with gold border and three oak leaf clusters, the Air Force Longevity Service Award with silver oak leaf cluster, the Armed Forces Reserve Medal with three mobilization devices and silver hourglass device, the Small Arms Expert Marksmanship Ribbon, the Air Force Training Ribbon, the United Nations Medal, and the NATO Medal. Additionally, In 2014, he was honored with the University of Notre Dame Alumni Association's Rev. John J. Cavanaugh, C.S.C., Award for "outstanding service in the field of government, patriotism, public service, local, state and national politics."
