= Michael Haefliger =

Swiss arts administrator and violinist (born 1961)

Michael Haefliger (born 2 May 1961) is a Swiss arts administrator. From 1999 to 2025, he served as Executive and Artistic Director of the Lucerne Festival; he is also the co-founder of the Lucerne Festival Orchestra, Lucerne Festival Academy, and Davos Festival—Young Artists in Concert.

== Early life and education ==
Michael Haefliger was born in West Berlin in 1961 to Swiss tenor Ernst Haefliger and architect Anna Golin; he is the brother of pianist Andreas Haefliger and actress Christine Marecek. He was raised in Berlin until the age of nine, when the family relocated to Munich. A musical child, he began studying piano and violin at the age of 6. In 1978, he enrolled in the Juilliard School in New York, where he studied violin with Ivan Galamian and Dorothy DeLay. He graduated in 1983 with a Bachelor of Music degree. He subsequently studied management at the Schools of Business, Law, and Social Sciences at University of St. Gallen, earning his Executive MBA in 1999. In 2003, Haefliger received a scholarship through the Harvard Club of Switzerland to attend the General Management Program at Harvard University.

== Early career (1986–1998) ==
Initially pursuing a career as a professional violinist, Haefliger made numerous festival appearances in his youth, including performances at Interlaken, Festival dei Due Mondi in Spoleto, and, with his brother, Andreas, at the Lucerne Festival—then known as the International Music Festival Lucerne.

In 1986, he founded the Davos Festival—Young Artists in Concert; he remained Artistic Director until 1998. Over his tenure, the festival developed into an opportunity for rising artists to grow their careers through a two-week series of concert performances and intensive, individual training. During this time, Haefliger also served as Artistic Director of Collegium Novum in Zürich (CNZ) from 1996–1998.

== Lucerne Festival (1999–2025) ==
Haefliger was named Artistic and Executive Director of the Lucerne Festival in 1999. Immediately upon assuming this role, he established a tradition of partnering with resident orchestras to present projects tied to an overarching theme, accompanied by world premieres of works by internationally-known composers. Among them were the Berliner Philharmoniker, Vienna Philharmonic, Los Angeles Philharmonic, and The Cleveland Orchestra, and conductors such as Claudio Abbado, Gustavo Dudamel, Zubin Mehta, Kirill Petrenko, Sir Simon Rattle, Esa-Pekka Salonen, and Franz Welser-Möst. That same year, Haefliger established the artist étoile residencies, featuring artists from all musical disciplines and focuses. Previous artists étoiles include pianists Daniil Trifonov, Yuja Wang, and Hélène Grimaud; violinists Leonidas Kavakos and Anne-Sophie Mutter; sopranos Golda Schultz and Barbara Hannigan; composer Tyshawn Sorey; and conductor Andris Nelsons.

In 2003, Haefliger established a new resident orchestra, the Lucerne Festival Orchestra—an ad-hoc, invite-only ensemble comprising leading soloists and ensemble musicians from around the world—with Claudio Abbado. Since its establishment, the Lucerne Festival Orchestra has become well-known as a performing ensemble around the world, with numerous recordings and concert tours and residencies in Europe, Asia, and the United States. Upon Abbado's death in 2014, Haefliger named Riccardo Chailly as the music director of the Festival Orchestra.

Also in 2003, Haefliger co-founded the Lucerne Festival Academy with Pierre Boulez. The Academy invites and funds more than 100 young musicians annually to work directly with conductors and composers from all over the world, with a focus on enhancing the understanding and performance of works from the 20th and 21st centuries. The Lucerne Festival Contemporary Orchestra, launched in 2021, is composed of members of the Lucerne Festival Academy. Since Boulez's death in 2016, Wolfgang Rihm has served as Artistic Director of the Academy.

Under Haefliger's leadership, the Festival has commissioned more than 300 works by contemporary composers, nearly doubled its operating budget from CHF 13 million in 1999 to 22 million in 2019, and maintained a 95% self-financing rate. He has also overseen several diversity initiatives, intended to impact both the Festival's leadership and the classical music industry as a whole. Accompanying these efforts are programs intended to broaden the Lucerne Festival's audience base, such as the "40 Minutes" series for families and Haefliger has also overseen the launch of three smaller festivals under the Lucerne Festival umbrella: the “Lucerne Festival Forward” contemporary music festival, which takes place in November; a spring festival featuring the Lucerne Festival Orchestra; and a piano festival that takes place in May.

The Festival's influence has also extended beyond Lucerne under Haefliger's watch, with tours throughout Europe, Asia, and the United States, and extended residencies at Shanghai's Symphony Hall and Tokyo's Suntory Hall. Beyond performance, Haefliger has led collaborations between the Lucerne Festival and artists, notably including the Ark Nova mobile concert hall, created in collaboration with Anish Kapoor and Arata Isozaki for people affected by the 2011 earthquake and tsuanami in Japan. First launched in Matsushima in 2013, Ark Nova has since been installed in Sendai, Fukushima, and Roppongi.

In November 2022, the Lucerne Festival announced that Haefliger would conclude his directorship in 2025. Sebastian Nordmann succeeded him from 1 January 2026.

== Honors and awards ==
In 2000, Haefliger was named Global Leader for Tomorrow by the World Economic Forum Foundation in Geneva. Other awards include the European Cultural Innovation Award (2003); the Tourism Award of the Tourism Forum Lucerne; the Central Swiss Cultural Prize (2014); the Award of the Swiss Society of New York (2014); and the Badge of Honor of the City of Lucerne (2014).

Haefliger serves on the boards of the Lang Lang International Music Foundation, UBS Cultural Foundation, Pierre Boulez Foundation, Davos Festival Foundation, and Foundation of the Swiss Music Youth Competition. He is the chairman of the jury for the Credit Suisse Young Artist Award, and vice-chairman of the board of the Swiss Top Events. He previously served on the boards of the World Arts Forum, American Friends of Lucerne Festival, and Avenir Suisse Foundation in Switzerland.

== Personal life ==
Haefliger lives in Lucerne, Switzerland. He speaks German, English, Spanish, French, Italian, and Russian. In 2015, he married the flutist Andrea Loetscher. He has one daughter, Anna Berenika Haefliger, from his first marriage to Irina Nikitina.
