= Konstantin Lifschitz =

Russian-Swiss pianist and university teacher (born 1976)

Konstantin Yakovlevich Lifschitz (Russian: Константин Яковлевич Лифшиц; born 10 December 1976 in Kharkov) is a Russian pianist of Jewish descent.

== Career ==
At the age of five Lifschitz came to the Gnessin Specialized Music School in Moscow. Tatiana Zelikman was his most important teacher. When he was 13 he gave his first recital at the House of the Unions (Moscow) that was greeted with enthusiasm. At the final exam (1994) he played the Goldberg Variations, Gaspard de la nuit and works by Alexander Nikolayevich Scriabin. His other teachers were Teodor Gutman, Vladimir Tropp, Karl Ulrich Schnabel, Fou Ts'ong, Alfred Brendel, Leon Fleischer, Rosalyn Tureck, Hamish Milne and Charles Rosen. Lifschitz did not participate in any piano competitions.

After the Perestroika he started to give concerts in major European cities. Among the orchestras he played with are I Solisti Veneti, MDR Leipzig Radio Symphony Orchestra, Academy of St Martin in the Fields, Staatsphilharmonie Rheinland-Pfalz, Konzerthausorchester Berlin, Mozarteum Orchestra Salzburg, Minnesota Orchestra, Bern Symphony Orchestra, London Symphony Orchestra, Chicago Symphony Orchestra, New York Philharmonic, Saint Petersburg Philharmonic Orchestra. Conductors were Andrey Boreyko, Bernard Haitink, Eliahu Inbal, Marek Janowski, Michail Jurowski, Eri Klas, Fabio Luisi, Neville Marriner, Claudio Scimone, Yuri Temirkanov, Dietrich Fischer-Dieskau, Mstislav Rostropovich.

Konstantin Lifschitz gives masterclasses all around the world. Since 2008 he has had his own class at the Lucerne University of Applied Sciences and Arts. In Switzerland he became a Swiss citizen. He lives near Lucerne.

He performs or has performed chamber music with string quartets and soloists including Gidon Kremer, Dmitry Sitkovetsky, Patricia Kopatchinskaja, Leila Josefowicz, Mischa Maisky, Lynn Harrell, Carolin Widmann, Bella Davidovich, Valery Afanassiev, Natalia Gutman, Jörg Widmann, Sol Gabetta, Alexei Volodin, Daishin Kashimoto, Maxim Vengerov, Mstislav Rostropovich (died 2007) and Eugene Ugorski (born 1989).

Lifschitz conducts orchestras and the Gabrieli Choir.

Orchestra

- St. Christopher Chamber Orchestra Vilnius
- Philharmonic Chamber Orchestra Wernigerode
- Chamber Orchestra Arpeggione Hohenems
- Dalarna Sinfonietta Falun
- Lux Aeterna Budapest
- I Solisti di Napoli
- Neujahrskonzert Langnau in Emmental
- Stuttgart Chamber Orchestra
- Copenhagen Philharmonic
- Moscow Virtuosi
- Century Orchestra Osaka

== Selected reviews ==
- Konstantin Lifschitz – review, The Guardian, 2011
- Konstantin Lifschitz – review, The Independent, 2007
- Bach’s Songs of Innocence and Experience, All in a Day, NY Times, 2007
- Schubert Piano works/Lifschitz/Palexa C

== Festivals ==
- Rheingau Musik Festival
- Miami International Piano Festival
- Lucerne Festival
- Schleswig-Holstein Musik Festival
- Bodenseefestival
- White Nights Festival, St. Petersburg
- George Enescu Festival, Bucharest
- Newport Music Festival
- Sommerliche Musiktage Hitzacker
- Tivoli Festival Copenhagen
- Les Nuits Pianistiques Festival, Aix-en-Provence
- SoNoRo International Chamber Music Festival, Bukarest

== Recordings ==
The pianist has released 39 recordings to date. A full list can be found on his website

- Johann Sebastian Bach and Peter Seabourne: Toccatas and Fantasies . Johann Sebastian Bach Toccatas BWV 910-916 and Peter Seabourne Steps Volume 6: Toccatas and Fantasias (Willowhayne Records, 2022)
- Ludwig van Beethoven: 32 Sonatas (Alpha Classics - ALPHA584, 2020)
- Maurice Ravel, Claude Debussy, Igor Stravinsky, Jakov Jakoulov: Daphnis et Chloé (Orfeo – C905162A, 2016)
- Johann Sebastian Bach: Goldberg Variationen BWV 988 (Orfeo – C864141A, 2015)
- Gottfried von Einem: Concerto op. 20 with Rundfunk-Symphonieorchester Wien, conductor Cornelius Meister (Orfeo - C8828112A, 2008)

== Dedications ==
- Peter Seabourne, Steps Volume 6: Toccatas and Fantasias
- James Bolle, Piano Concert
- Vladimir Ryabov, 4 Chromatic Studies
- Jakov Jacoulov, Carrousel
- Boris Yoffe, Humble Muse
- Rahel Senn, Song of a Magnolia
- Denis Burstein, Variations
- Inna Zhvanetskaya, Dance-Suite (Partita)
- Nimrod Borenstein, Melancholic Mobile (No. 3 from Reminiscences of Childhood)
- Colette Mourey, Eaux-Fortes, No. 6: Une promenade (spirituelle) à Rome

== Prizes ==
- Echo (music award) Best International Newcomer (1995) for the Debut Recording
- Grammy Award Nomination (1996) For the Goldberg Variations Recording
- Associate, later Fellow of the Royal Academy of Music (2003)
- Rowenna Prize of the Reed Kostellow Fund (New York) (2006)
- Holy Sergius of Radonezh Order (Moskau) (2007)
