= Orchestra Mozart =

The Orchestra Mozart or Orchestra Mozart Bologna is an Italian orchestra based in Bologna.

== Creation ==
The orchestra was created in 2004 by Carlo Maria Badini, as a special project within the Regia Accademia Filarmonica (Philharmonic Academy) of Bologna. It was funded by the Fondazione Cassa di Risparmio in Bologna (Foundation of Bologna Savings Bank; Carisbo) .

Claudio Abbado agreed to become Artistic Director of the orchestra and recruit its members. Giuseppe Modugno was designated from the beginning as Artistic Secretary.

The orchestra gave its first concert on November 4, 2004 in Bologna's Auditorium Manzoni.

The orchestra performs in many major Italian cities and in Vienna's Musikverein, where it is in residence.

The orchestra tours Europe and is regularly invited to the Salzburg Festival.

The Orchestra Mozart cooperated with different theatres and musical institutions in Europe, as well as in Asia. Among them are Accademia Nazionale di Santa Cecilia in Rome, Teatro San Carlo in Naples, Teatro La Fenice in Venice, Teatro Carlo Felice in Genoa, Teatro Massimo in Palermo, Ravenna Festival, Lucerne Festival, Concertgebouw in Amsterdam, Salzburg Festival, Salle Pleyel in Paris, Palais de Beaux Arts in Brussels, Alte Oper in Frankfurt, Auditorio Nacional in Madrid, National Concert Hall in Budapest.

== Composition ==
The orchestra is basically a chamber orchestra (a form of which is sometimes also called a "Mozart orchestra"), meaning that it has fewer musicians than a full-sized symphony orchestra (especially in the strings, since the number of woodwind, horn players and other musicians is less flexible), producing lighter, chamber-music-like sound. However, the number of musicians sometimes exceeds this format: in its June 2012 concerts, for example, the orchestra played Ludwig van Beethoven's Egmont Overture and Robert Schumann's Piano Concerto and Second Symphony with 14 first violins, 12 second violins, 10 violas, 8 cellos and 5 double-basses (typical numbers in a symphony orchestra being 16 first violins, 14 second violins, 12 violas, 10 cellos and 8 double-basses).

The orchestra acts as a meeting-place for young musicians from many countries, partly selected through the Orchestra Mozart Academy within the Philharmonic Academy, and experienced musicians. The latter have included violinist Giuliano Carmignola, violists Wolfram Christ and Diemut Poppen, double-bass player Alois Posch, oboist Lucas Macias Navarro, flautist Jacques Zoon, horn player Alessio Allegrini.

Diego Matheuz is Principal Guest Conductor of the Orchestra Mozart; other conductors have included Daniele Gatti.

== Recordings ==
The orchestra conducted by Claudio Abbado is featured on several Deutsche Grammophon CDs, mainly of Wolfgang Amadeus Mozart compositions. Deutsche Grammophon released Abbado's first recordings with the orchestra on its period imprint Archiv Produktion, despite the use of modern instruments; the later albums have been released under the yellow label.
