= Steps piano cycle series (Seabourne) =

Series of large scale piano cycles by Peter Seabourne

Steps (piano cycle series) is a set of large-scale piano works written by British composer Peter Seabourne, currently standing at 11 volumes (220 pieces) of approximately 9 hours total duration. Each cycle is based around a theme and comprises a sequence of often poetically entitled movements.

== The cycles ==
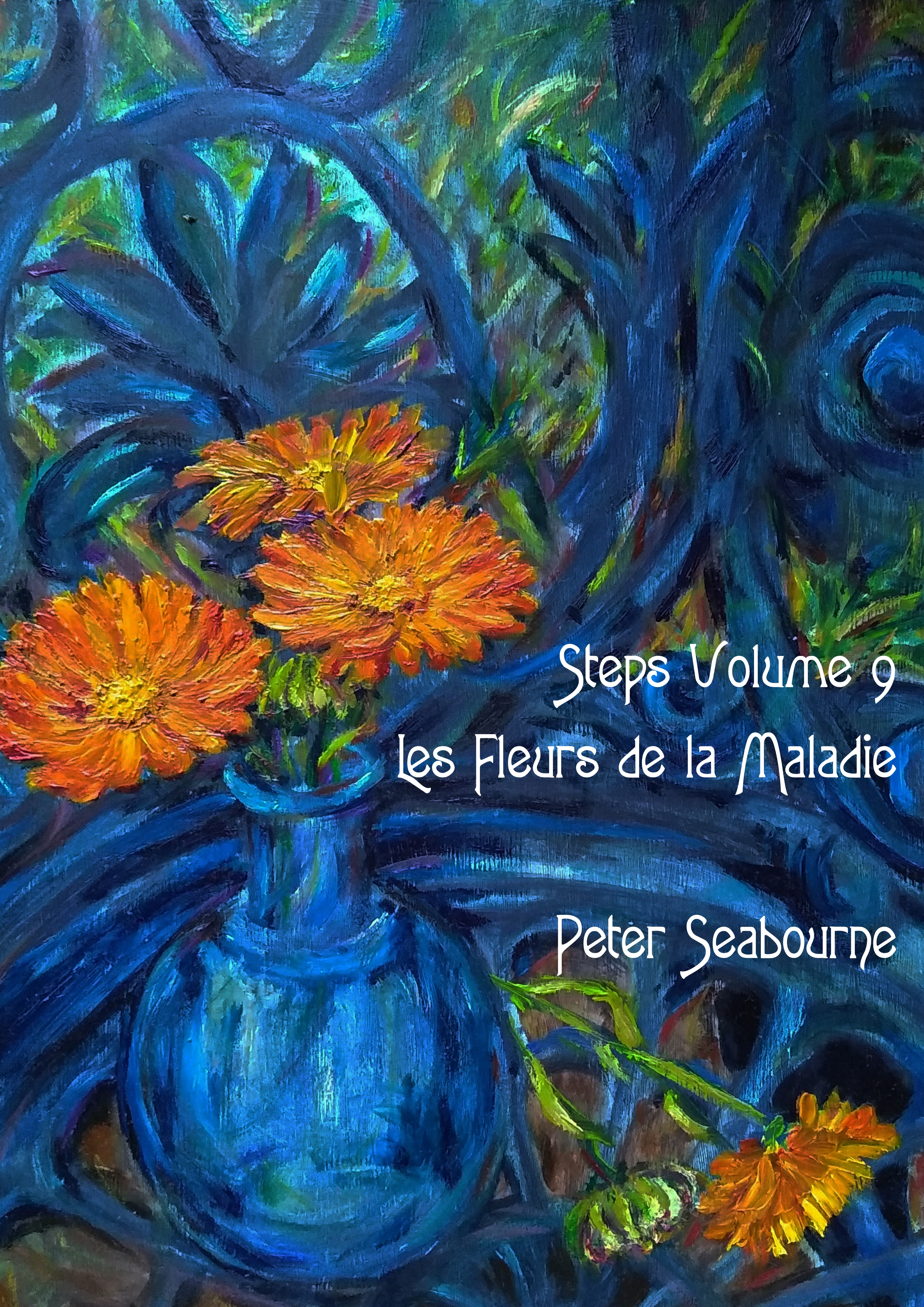
Title page of Steps Volume 9: Les Fleurs de la Maladie. Painting: Marigolds on a Blue Chair (2018) by Marcelle Seabourne

There are 11 volumes:

1. An Anthology for Piano – a collection of 12 pieces composed between 2001 and 2004
2. Studies of Invention – 15 movements inspired by the life, work, writings and investigations of Leonardo da Vinci
3. Arabesques – 9 pieces inspired by a visit to The Alhambra, Granada, and a collaboration with the composer's aunt, the painter Ann Seabourne, presented at The Clothworkers Hall, Leeds in June 2014
4. Libro di Canti Italiano – 19 pieces reflecting aspects of the Italian character, and the musical interests of its dedicatee Giuseppe Modugno
5. Sixteen Scenes Before a Crucifixion – an exploration of impending trauma inspired by the Passiontide paintings of Caravaggio
6. Toccatas and Fantasias – 12 pieces written to be played alongside the Toccatas of Johann Sebastian Bach.
7. Dances on the Head of a Pin – 38 dances, each with a sense of restriction or awkwardness
8. My Song in October – 19 pieces with titles from poems about falling leaves - in memory of the composer's wife.
9. Les Fleurs de la Maladie – 18 pieces related to the late flower paintings by Édouard Manet and the composer's wife, Marcelle Seabourne.
10. In a Grain of Sand – 38 pieces inspired by highly magnified grains of beach sand, and two related poems by Romanian poet-pianist Oana Rusu Tomai with whom this project was a collaboration.
11. The Curious Diary of Mr Doyle – 24 pieces inspired by the sketchbook of Charles Altamont Doyle (father of Sir Arthur Conan Doyle) kept whilst at Montrose Royal Lunatic Asylum (later Sunnyside Royal Hospital) in the 1880s. Doyle was a talented illustrator with his diary encompassing cartoons based on witty puns, observed daily scenes, oversized beasts, objects from the natural world, dreams of both foreboding and redemption, Irish nationalism and numerous images of fairies; the whole in drawings and watercolours.

The first volume (2001–04) marked the composer's return to composition after a 12-year silence. Originally simply a series of standalone pieces, it was only subsequently gathered into an anthology. However, from the second volume onwards the works are conceived as integrated single spans in the manner of Janacek's On an Overgrown Path, or Schumann's Carnaval.

The Italian CD label Sheva has recorded volumes 1–5, and vol. 8 with pianists Minjeong Shin, Giovanni Santini, Michael Bell, Fabio Menchetti, and Alessandro Viale. Volume 6 was released in May 2022 by Konstantin Lifschitz on Willowhayne Records.. The CDs have been reviewed in Gramophone, BBC Music Magazine, Musical Opinion, International Piano, Piano News, Hudební rozhledy and many other magazines. Numerous live performances have taken place in Europe, Armenia, The United States of America and Japan, including by Alessandro Viale, Fabio Menchetti, Konstantin Lifschitz, Minjeong Shin, Michael Bell, Bethel Balge, Giuseppe Modugno, Haruko Seki, Chantal Balestri, Simone Rugani, Andrea Emanuele, Ettore Strangio, Giordano De Nisi, Emanuele Stracchi, Paolo Rinaldi, Barbara Panzarella, Giulia Grassi, Francesca Fierro, Isabella Gori, Letitia Amodio, Francesca Lauri, Sarah Vella, Daphne Delicata, Alvaro Siculiana, Julian Chan, Tsovinar Suflyan, and Mikhail Shilyaev.

The composer's musical language is loosely tonal but is often stretched to include elements of polytonality, modality, and free atonality. In Musical Opinion, Richard Whitehouse wrote of "a demonstrably Romantic rhetoric with an always audible and yet never facile approach to tonality". A striking feature throughout is the use of rhythm, described by one reviewer as "amazingly inventive" [of Volume 2]. This involves a widespread, subtle stretching of both individual beats and metre giving the music a feeling of flux and ongoing rubato.

== Complete listing ==
=== Vol. 1: An Anthology for Piano (2001-4) ===
- Greeting!
- Still
- The Little White Girl
- El Suspiro del Moro
- Split The Lark...
- Suspended Journeys
  1. 19
  2. Black
  3. A Touch
- Little Scene
- Over The Ocean
- Awake!
- The Sun – just touched the Morning!
- In Winter
  1. Im Windesweben
  2. An Baches Ranft
  3. Winter Landscape with Rocks
  4. Noch zwingt mich treue
  5. The Lark in Winter
  6. The Rose in Winter
- Trois Petits Adieux
  1. (Crotchet=76)
  2. Playful yet poignant
  3. Sombre

=== Vol. 2: Studies of Invention (2007) ===
- Flying Machines
- Sixty Beggars
- Old Man with Water Studies
- Study of a Woman's Hands
- The Kite of the Cradle
- Tank
- Polishing Imperfections in Glass
- A Moth to the Light
- Perspectives of Disappearance
- La Scapigliata
- The Existence of Nothingness
- The Impossibility of Perpetual Motion
- Lenses for Looking at the Moon
- Study of a Deluge
- This is the Way Birds Descend

=== Vol. 3: Arabesques (2012) ===
1. The Bright Window
2. Generalife – daybreak (I am the garden, revealed in beauty every morning)
3. Melted silver, pearls, tears, clouds
4. Dark Day
5. Fountains
6. Hamann Baths – blue secrets
7. Mid-Afternoon – The Red Fort
8. Water Gardens – the dark watchers – early evening
9. Dream – domes of mocárabes

=== Vol. 4: Libro di Canti Italiano (2011) ===
- Canto della Vita
- Domande
- Viaggio di Notte
- Piccolo Canto d'Amore Tremante
- Piccolo Canto delle Gocce di Pioggia
- Canto I miei Sogni
- Passi Sbagliati - Canzone Bacchica
- Canto della Ragazza da Toulouse
- Canto delle Farfalle
- Carillon Triste
- Canto d'Ammutinamento
- Notturno
- Canto Burbero
- Canto Lontano
- Anche gli Uccelli - Souvenir de Bertinoro
- Canto Oscuro
- Canto delle Foglie Cadenti
- Canzonetta in Stile Antico (omaggio da Robin Holloway)
- Canto Gioioso

=== Vol. 5: Sixteen Scenes Before a Crucifixion (2014) ===
- No. 1
- No. 2
- No. 3
- No. 4
- No. 5
- No. 6
- No. 7
- No. 8
- No. 9
- No. 10
- No. 11
- No. 12
- No. 13
- No. 14
- No. 15
- No. 16

=== Vol. 6: Toccatas and Fantasias (2017) ===
- Toccata No. 1
- Fantasia Lachryma
- Toccata No. 2
- Fantasia Tragica
- Toccata No. 3
- Fantasia Tenebrosa
- Toccata No. 4
- Fantasia Meditativa
- Toccata No. 5
- Fantasia Malinconica
- Toccata No. 6
- Aria Sarabanda con variazioni

=== Vol. 7: Dances on the Head of a Pin (2019) ===
1. Spanish Sun Dance
2. Sand Dance
3. Galumph
4. Musing Dance
5. Uncertain Steps
6. Doll's Dance
7. River Dance
8. Weaving Dance
9. Minuet, or even a Sarabande
10. Snake Dance
11. One False Step
12. Spiteful Dance
13. How Still the Dancer Lies
14. Dance of Death
15. Lollop
16. Un-Ravelling Dance
17. Fall Down Seven Times, Get Up Eight!
18. Impatient Mazurka
19. Pas des Deux: L'Ancien et la Jeune Danseuse
20. First Attempts at a Pirhouette
21. The Lead Dancer Shows his Mettle
22. Three Legs
23. Pavan for a Revived Princess
24. Danse Françaix?
25. Bacchanalian Whirl
26. Slow Movement
27. The Amazing Dance of the Peacock Spider
28. Tread Softly...
29. Stamping Dance
30. Helter Skelter
31. Hop of Hope - with Harp
32. Carefully, Carefully! Slow Sword Dance
33. Snap Shot - Ecossaise
34. With How Sad Steps
35. Hobble
36. Unreel
37. Before a Tarantella
38. Tarantella

=== Vol. 8: My Song in October (2021) ===
1. Komorebi
2. How beautifully it falls
3. At the fall of the leaf
4. When the leaves are flying
5. This leaf
6. When the rose is dead
7. The drifting leaf
8. One by one
9. On the wings of the breeze
10. The leaves are falling
11. Oh, lift me as a wave, a leaf, a cloud!
12. As a dead leaf
13. The wind scatters the golden leaves!
14. Every breath
15. Listen...
16. After Autumn, Winter
17. The wind whispers in dry leaves
18. This sprig of heather
19. Who'll toll the bell?

=== Vol. 9: Les Fleurs de la Maladie (2021) ===
- An Empty Bench – My Garden (1881)
- Snowdrops (now is the globe shrunk tight)
- Imagined Bouquet from Berthe Morisot
- Helleborus Foetidus (hope in winter)
- Imagined Bouquet from Suzanne Manet
- Tulips (the flame)
- Imagined Bouquet from Antonin Proust
- Dandelions in flower and in seed (any way the wind blows)
- Imagined Bouquet from Stéphane Mallarmé
- Delphinium (nothing can restrain this heart)
- Imagined Bouquet from Victorine Meurent
- Lilies on a Windowsill (outside-in)
- Imagined Bouquet from Charles Baudelaire
- Rosa Glauca (departures)
- Imagined Bouquet from Émmanuel Chabrier
- Marigolds on a blue chair (last summer)
- Imagined Bouquet from Méry Laurent
- An Empty Chair – My Garden (2020)

=== Vol. 10: In a Grain of Sand (2023) ===
1. I look through you at the sun
2. You ignite your own fire
3. Reverberate through hidden mossy chambers
4. Long stony corridors and marine gems
5. Patiently rethinking the world
6. Dissolving like honey on God's tongue
7. With a nonchalant gesture you put to my eye
8. A lens of magnificent refractions
9. To my ear, a curious sound
10. First, a rumbling, then, surrender
11. At last, the beatific moment when you fly in the air
12. With a stellar whoosh…
13. A wonder that does not know of itself
14. As all marvels are, innocent
15. Of aggrandizing and human drama
16. Spending of itself inexhaustibly
17. In prisms of glory and enigmatic hexagons
18. A grain of sand is a sun
19. Much closer to us than any other revelation planets.
20. A letter full of breaths has arrived
21. A nameless sender's courtesy to me
22. The hand is puzzling, grains of sand
23. Pour in the heart, and plunge in opened earth
24. Time is passing without progressing
25. The sundial memorializes someone's joy in a return
26. Stunned language of silence, unvoiced throat,
27. Pigments of longing infuse our reunions
28. Who has been calling all night
29. In the realm of air and water?
30. Watching with eyes of wild birds
31. Breathing with lungs of tuft and grasses?
32. Shall I call you a Shadow?
33. Lithe body of quiet revolt
34. Your sleeves are as light as sails
35. Quickening a boat towards darkness
36. The river of love and death is ready to swallow
37. Our pleasure trips into what caused us pain
38. A silver fish's splash submerges in a last lingering chord.

=== Vol. 11: The Curious Diary of Mr Doyle (2024) ===
1. Something queer both in head and heart
2. If our supporters fell out!
3. Quite the reverse (Madam : Dam Mad)
4. Portrait of a gentleman
5. A wearing of the green
6. Prevention is better than cure!
7. Cupid and the gay Lutharian
8. The polecat and the maiden
9. Saluting Miss May
10. The dreadful secret
11. Genuine Columbine
12. An angel taking a soul to Heaven
13. Stop thief!
14. Tommy's poppy...
15. Ranken's listener
16. A windy walk
17. Polished ways (what a delicious little romance this opens up)
18. Another sort of creeper
19. She soars – glimpse of high flyers (a floor polisher's fantasy)
20. Friendly but sorrowful... (where Pussy used to sit at home)
21. The close embrace
22. Sunnyside afternoon
23. Gloria in excelsis!
24. Come home
