= Mahler Chamber Orchestra =

Italian professional touring chamber orchestra

The Mahler Chamber Orchestra is a professional touring chamber orchestra founded by Claudio Abbado and former members of the Gustav Mahler Youth Orchestra in 1997.

The MCO appears throughout the year in about 60–70 concerts and performances. It consists of 45 musicians from 20 different nations. Its activities include concerts, opera projects, chamber music as well as CD recordings. Strong artistic links have been established with Daniel Harding (principal guest conductor 1998–2003, music director 2003–2008, principal conductor 2008–2011 and conductor laureate since 2011) and Claudio Abbado. The MCO has had stable residencies in Ferrara (Ferrara Musica, founder: Claudio Abbado) and Lucerne (Lucerne Festival). The first concert and founding residency of the MCO began on 21 November 1997 in Landshut, Germany.

The MCO's repertoire reaches from baroque to contemporary music. The MCO is a free-financed orchestra without any state support. Sponsors are, therefore, required to maintain the orchestra.

== History ==
The combined principles of artistic curiosity and the broadest possible spectrum of repertoire, both at the highest possible musical level, was mentioned by the ensemble as reasons for its founding and its work today.

Maintaining high standard collaborations with high-profile partners has been of particular importance, from the very beginning, in the selection of soloists and conductors as well as concert promoters and venues. Alongside founder Claudio Abbado, Daniel Harding has been a determining figure in the development of the orchestra. Serving at first as principal guest conductor, Harding became music director in summer 2003, Principal Conductor in 2008 and Conductor Laureate in 2011. The orchestra also maintains close artistic relationships with its Artistic Partner Leif Ove Andsnes. Projects with noted specialists in particular techniques or repertoire also make up an important element of the orchestra's program. Baroque workshops, at which specialists instruct in historical performance practice, have been a part of the MCO's schedule since 2004, and the MCO regularly works with experts in early or contemporary music, such as Reinhard Goebel or Jonathan Nott.

The independently financed MCO is flexible its organisational structure. The core of the MCO is made up of approximately 45 musicians of 20 different nationalities. Additional musicians are engaged as needed. The ensemble comes together for single projects, composing itself according to the specific requirements of each individual program. This has led to the development of a cultivated and sensitive orchestral sound which has become the ensemble's trademark. Rather than having a single fixed home base, the orchestra has residencies in various European cities, which provide rehearsal opportunities and often a launching point for worldwide tours. The Mahler Chamber Orchestra is orchestra-in-residence in Ferrara. Long-term contracts also connect the orchestra to the Lucerne Festival, where the orchestra has performed since 2003.

The orchestra had its international breakthrough just a year after its founding with Mozart's opera Don Giovanni, which premiered at the Festival International d’Art Lyrique d’Aix-en-Provence in 1998 under the direction of Claudio Abbado and Daniel Harding. The ensuing world tour of this production not only brought the ensemble international acclaim, but also led to a residency contract with the Aix-en-Provence festival. Since then, the orchestra has collaborated on many notable and successful productions in Aix, including: The Turn of the Screw (Daniel Harding/Luc Bondy, 2001), Eugen Onegin (Daniel Harding/Irina Brook), The Love of Three Oranges (Tugan Sokhiev/Philippe Calvario, 2004), Così fan tutte (Daniel Harding/Patrice Chéreau, 2005) and Written on Skin (George Benjamin/Martin Crimp, 2012.) A residency contract with Ferrara Musica was signed in 1998, providing for two concert series a year. In addition to opera projects with Claudio Abbado, concert series with MCO music director Daniel Harding and renowned guest conductors such as Christopher Hogwood, Philippe Herreweghe, Paavo Järvi, Murray Perahia and Vladimir Ashkenazy also take place here. Soloists such as Cecilia Bartoli, Martha Argerich, Christian Tetzlaff or Emanuel Ax join the orchestra for concert programs that serve to draw ever-increasing attention to the orchestra both in Ferrara and on an international level.

In its sixteen years, the MCO has recorded several prize-winning CDs. Discs recorded under the direction of Daniel Harding include: Don Giovanni, The Turn of the Screw (recipient of several awards, including the Choc de l’année 2002), Haydn Cello Concertos with Gautier Capuçon (Choc du monde de la musique 2003, among others), Gustav Mahler’s Fourth Symphony in a recording was received enthusiastically by the international press (all released by Virgin Classics) and Antonín Dvořák’s Cello Concerto. The Deutsche Grammophon release of Berlioz's Symphonie Fantastique as conducted by Marc Minkowski received the Jahrespreis der Deutschen Schallplattenkritik 2003. Recordings with founder Claudio Abbado have also been released by Deutsche Grammophon: Italian opera arias with Anna Netrebko and works for oboe by Mozart and Lebrun with Albrecht Mayer. The live recording of Beethoven’s 2nd and 3rd piano concertos with Martha Argerich was honoured with a Grammy Award, and the recording of violin concertos of Stravinsky and Alban Berg with Kolja Blacher won a Diapason d’Or. In 2013, the first album of the Beethoven Cycle with Leif Ove Andsnes as soloist and conductor was released, featuring Piano Concertos nos. 1 and 3, in February 2014, the second album cycle was released, featuring Piano Concertos nos. 2 and 4.

The annual concerts at the Lucerne Festival (where the Mahler Chamber Orchestra performs not only as the core of the Lucerne Festival Orchestra, but also in its usual formation in its own concerts), regular opera and concert projects at the Festspielhaus Baden-Baden and at the Théâtre des Champs-Élysées, chamber music series, invitations to high-profile European festivals and extensive tours to locations around the world - the list of activities grows ever longer.

Daniele Gatti has been appointed Artistic Advisor of MCO starting from 27 May 2016.

The Mahler Chamber Orchestra has also been featured in a touring Virtual Reality experience, "Symphony: A Virtual Journey into the Heart of Music" led by conductor Gustavo Dudamel, since 22 September 2020.

In the BBC Proms Edition of 2021 the MCO was the only international orchestra that was invited to play a concert, under the baton of George Benjamin. From the season of 2023-2024, the orchestra will act as Artistic Director of the Hitzacker Musikwoche for a period of five years.
