= Modugno (surname) =

Modugno (pronounced [moˈduɲɲo]) is an Italian surname from Apulia. It is likely a toponymic surname derived from the Apulian town of Modugno. People with the name include:

- Domenico Modugno (1928–1994), Italian singer, songwriter, actor, and politician
- Enrica Maria Modugno (born 1958), Italian actress
- Franco Modugno (born 1938), Italian law professor and judge
- Giuseppe Modugno (born 1960), Italian pianist
- Lucia Modugno (1932–2026), Italian actress and writer
- Ludovica Modugno (1949–2021), Italian actress and voice actress
- Raffaella Modugno (born 1988), Italian model

== See also ==
- 6598 Modugno, a minor planet
