= Lucerne Festival Academy =

Swiss educational institution

The Lucerne Festival Academy is an orchestra-sized educational institution devoted exclusively to the interpretation and performance of contemporary classical music. It has taken place each summer since 2003 in the Swiss city of Lucerne as part of the Lucerne Festival in Summer. Founded by the French composer Pierre Boulez and festival director Michael Haefliger, over 1,300 young musicians from over 60 countries have taken part in the Academy, described by The Guardian as "the annual laboratory in which brilliant young musicians are immersed in the performance practice of 20th- and 21st-century music".

== History ==
Michael Haefliger was appointed Executive and Artistic Director of the Lucerne Festival in 1999, and in the immediate years that followed he oversaw the re-branding of the then-called Internationalen Musikfestwochen Luzern (IMF), the creation of the Lucerne Festival Orchestra together with Claudio Abbado, and the founding of the Lucerne Festival Academy alongside Pierre Boulez. After a small ensemble of young European instrumentalists was invited to perform a trial project in 2003, a large orchestra of over 100 musicians from around the world has been invited to Lucerne every summer since. Almost all performances until 2012 were conducted by Boulez himself, with instrumental coaching and technical support was provided by his Ensemble InterContemporain.

In recent years, guest conductors including David Robertson, Peter Eötvös and Sir Simon Rattle have been invited to lead masterclasses and conduct concerts, with Boulez being present for the last time in 2013. A day of concerts featuring Boulez's music paired with world premieres was performed in August 2015 to celebrate his 90th birthday, and following his death in January 2016 a memorial concert was performed by alumni of the Academy, featuring pieces which he had conducted at the Academy alongside two of his own works.

From 2016 to 2018, Matthias Pintscher was Principal Conductor of the Academy and since 2016, Artistic Director has been the German composer Wolfgang Rihm who died in 2024. Rihm's successor has been Jörg Widmann, effective January 2026.

With a focus on music from roughly the last 100 years, the academy's repertoire ranges from masterworks by Mahler, Stravinsky or Bartók to commissioned works from living composers including Unsuk Chin, Isabel Mundry, Olga Neuwirth and younger composers. As well as several concerts for large symphony orchestra, each year's programme also includes chamber music, featuring in recent years collaborations with composers Heinz Holliger, Helmut Lachenmann and Tod Machover.

== Lucerne Festival Contemporary Orchestra ==
The Lucerne Festival Contemporary Orchestra (LFCO) an orchestra of excellence for the interpretation of contemporary music was founded in 2021. This newly conceived Festival orchestra for the music of our time comprises members of the international Academy network. It brings together current and former students of the Lucerne Festival Academy. Former students of the Academy were represented as the Lucerne Festival Alumni, of which an ensemble was invited to perform new works at the summer festival each year. The first alumni performance outside of Europe took place in 2016 during the NY Phil Biennial at the Metropolitan Museum of Art in New York, as part of Met Museum Presents under the direction of New York Philharmonic Music Director Alan Gilbert.

The Academy’s network, which has grown over 16 years, now numbers over 1300 instrumentalists, conductors and composers. It represents Lucerne Festival’s long-standing commitment to new and contemporary music. The repertoire of the new orchestra ranges from the threshold of classical modernism to works of the present day. In both large and small formations, the LFCO performs concerts at the Academy during the Summer Festival, followed by guest appearances abroad.

The Lucerne Festival Contemporary Orchestra also takes on the leading role in the new autumn weekend Lucerne Festival Forward which takes place for the first time in November 2021. The Festival Forward emphasizes new, innovative developments in the field of contemporary music. The Festival moreover actively involves the public in the planning process through its digital communication channels. The KKL Luzern serves as the Festival headquarters, but Lucerne Festival Forward will perform throughout the city, involving all age groups, and will offer unusual concert formats and integrate new technologies. The inaugural Lucerne Festival Forward will be held from 19 to 21 November 2021.
