= Daniele Gatti =

Italian conductor (born 1961)

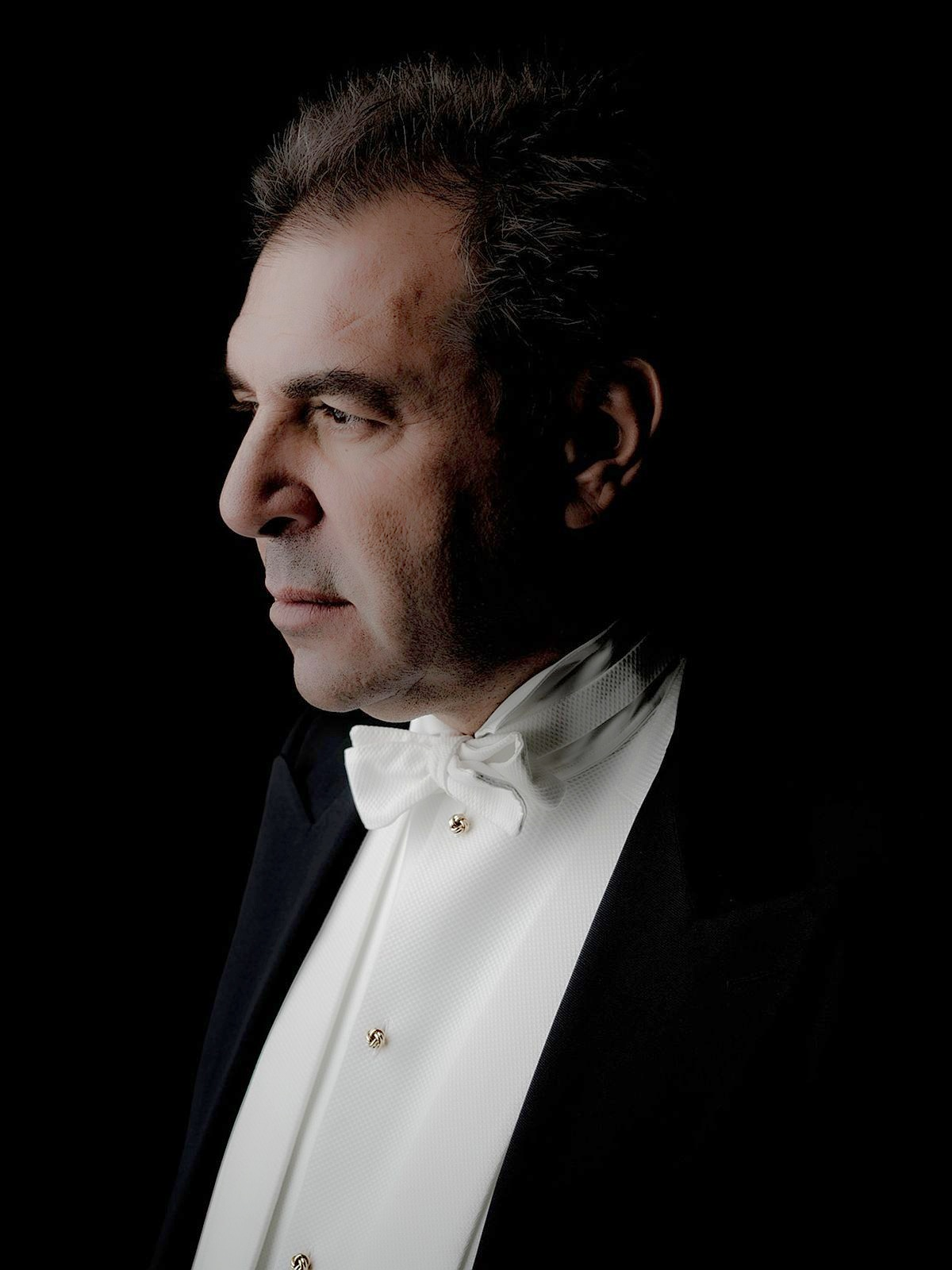
- Gatti in 2017
- Born: 6 November 1961 (age 64); Milan, Italy
- Occupation: Conductor
- Organizations: Maggio Musicale Fiorentino; Mahler Chamber Orchestra; Orchestra Mozart; Staatskapelle Dresden
- Website: www.danielegatti.eu

Daniele Gatti (born 6 November 1961) is an Italian conductor. He is currently chief conductor of Maggio Musicale Fiorentino, artistic advisor of the Mahler Chamber Orchestra, music director of the Orchestra Mozart and chief conductor of the Staatskapelle Dresden.

== Biography ==
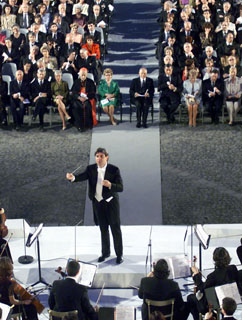
Gatti conducting a concert at the Quirinal Palace in Rome.

Gatti was born in Milan. He was the music director of the Orchestra Dell'Accademia Nazionale di Santa Cecilia in Rome from 1992 to 1997. In 1997, he became the music director of the Orchestra del Teatro Comunale di Bologna. He has also served as principal guest conductor of the Royal Opera House, Covent Garden. In 2005, alongside Zubin Mehta and Christian Thielemann, Gatti was invited to conduct a concert in commemoration of the fiftieth anniversary of the 1955 reopening and renovation of the Vienna State Opera. His debut at the Bayreuth Festival was in Stefan Herheim's production of Parsifal in 2008.

In 1994, Gatti made his first guest conducting appearance with the Royal Philharmonic Orchestra (RPO). He was immediately offered the position of the RPO's principal conductor, and he assumed the post in 1996. Gatti is regarded as having restored the RPO's status on par to the other main London orchestras. During his tenure, in 2004, the RPO acquired its first permanent residency at Cadogan Hall. In April 2007, Gatti was one of eight conductors of British orchestras to endorse the 10-year classical music outreach manifesto, "Building on Excellence: Orchestras for the 21st Century", to increase the presence of classical music in the UK, including giving free entry to all British schoolchildren to a classical music concert. In 2009, Gatti stepped down as the RPO's principal conductor and became the orchestra's conductor laureate.

Gatti was Music Director of the Orchestre National de France from 2008 to 2016. He was chief conductor of the Zurich Opera from 2009 to 2012. In October 2014, the Royal Concertgebouw Orchestra (KCO) appointed Gatti as its seventh chief conductor, effective September 2016. His KCO guest-conducting debut had been in April 2004. On 2 August 2018, the KCO terminated his appointment with immediate effect, citing accusations of "inappropriate behavior", and that "a number of female colleagues of the Royal Concertgebouw Orchestra reported experiences with Gatti, which are inappropriate considering his position as chief conductor." This followed after a report in The Washington Post was published citing two women who accused Gatti of sexual misconduct. In 2019, the orchestra posted a statement on its website stating that "matters between the two parties have been resolved following extensive discussions", while Gatti issued an apology, saying, "Today and moving forward, I plan to focus much more on my behaviours and actions with all women."

In May 2016, Gatti was appointed Artistic Advisor of the Mahler Chamber Orchestra. He has been teaching at the Accademia Musicale Chigiana since 2016. Gatti first guest-conducted with the Teatro dell'Opera di Roma during the 2016-2017 season. He returned for subsequent guest engagements in each of the following two seasons. In December 2018, the company announced the appointment of Gatti as its new music director, with immediate effect. He became music director of Orchestra Mozart in May 2019.

Gatti had first guest-conducted the Staatskapelle Dresden in 2000. In June 2022, the orchestra announced its election of Gatti as its next chief conductor, effective in 2024.

In July 2021, the Maggio Musicale Fiorentino announced the appointment of Gatti as its new principal conductor, effective March 2022, with an initial contract of 3 years. In June 2025, the Maggio Musicale Fiorentino announced the promotion of Gatti to the title of its music director, as of the 2026 season, with an initial contract of 3 years.

Cultural offices
Preceded by Gianluigi Gelmetti	Music Director, Teatro dell'Opera di Roma; 2018–present	Succeeded by incumbent
Preceded by Claudio Abbado	Music Director, Orchestra Mozart; 2019–present	Succeeded by incumbent
Preceded by Fabio Luisi	Principal Conductor, Maggio Musicale Fiorentino; 2022–present	Succeeded by incumbent
