= Marina Piccinini =

American flutist (born 1968)

Marina Piccinini (born 1968) is an Italian-American flautist. She is noted for her performances of both the traditional classical repertoire as well as by modern composers, and has performed with many of the world's leading orchestras and conductors.

== Early life and education ==
Marina Piccinini was born to an Italian father and a Brazilian mother, both mathematicians. As a child, she lived in Brazil, Switzerland, and Canada before moving to New York City to study at the Juilliard School.

She began playing the flute at age 10 while living in St. John's, Newfoundland, and was self-taught. At the age of 16 she graduated from high School and moved to Toronto to study with Jeanne Baxtresser at the University of Toronto. Two years later, at the invitation of Julius Baker, she moved to New York City to continue her studies with him at the Juilliard School on full scholarship, where she attained both a Bachelor's and a Master's degree.

During her years at the Juilliard School she also studied with Aurèle Nicolet in Switzerland.

== Biography ==
Piccinini was born in the United States to an Italian father and a Brazilian mother. Piccinini became interested in the operas of Mozart as a young girl at the age of 7, and began playing the flute at the age of 10. She grew up in Newfoundland, Canada and did not have formal flute lessons from a teacher until she was 16. In Toronto, she won First Prize in the CBC Young Performers Competition. She later moved to New York City to commence studying at the prestigious Juilliard School and won First Prize in New York's Concert Artists Guild International Competition. She was awarded a scholarship by the Concert Artists Guild in 1986, winning First Prize in their international competition. In 1991, she became the first flutist to receive an Avery Fisher Career Grant from the Lincoln Center. and was named Young Artist to watch by Musical America. She has studied under mentors such as Jeanne Baxtresser, Julius Baker and Aurele Nicolet.

Piccinini has performed internationally as a soloist with such orchestras as the Boston Symphony Orchestra, the London Philharmonic Orchestra, the Vienna Symphony Orchestra, Montreal Symphony Orchestra, Rotterdam Philharmonic Orchestra, National Symphony Orchestra, St. Louis Symphony Orchestra, Minnesota orchestra, Saint Paul Chamber Orchestra, Toronto Symphony, and the Tokyo Symphony Orchestra, the Hong Kong Philarmonic, KBS Symphony in Seoul, and the Taipei Symphony Orchestra in Asia. Other orchestras include Ottawa's National Arts Centre Orchestra; the Hannover Symphony in Germany, the Ravenna Chamber Orchestra in Italy and the Vienna Chamber Soloists; as well as the Cincinnati, New World, Vancouver, Detroit, Phoenix, and Milwaukee symphony orchestras. She has worked with such conductors as Alan Gilbert, Seiji Ozawa, Kurt Masur, Pierre Boulez, Leonard Slatkin, Stanisław Skrowaczewski, Andres Orozco-Estrada, Peter Oundjian, Esa-Pekka Salonen, Myung-whun Chung, Cristian Macelaru, and Gianandrea Noseda.

Piccinini has performed at New York's Town Hall, the Avery Fisher Hall and Alice Tully Halls in the Lincoln Center, the Weill Recital Hall, Zankell Hall and Stern Auditiorium of Carnegie Hall, in London's Southbank Centre, Wigmore Hall and the Barbican Centre, the Kennedy Center in Washington, D.C., in Vienna's Konzerthaus, in Amsterdam's Concertgebow, Cologne's Philharmonie., the Suntory Hall in Tokyo, and in the Seoul Arts Center in Korea. A devoted chamber musician, she has collaborated with the pianists Andreas Haefliger, Mitsuko Uchida, Michaela Ursuleasa and numerous string quartets such as the former Tokyo, Brentano, Pacifica Quartet Mendelssohn Quartet, the Takács Quartet and with the Nexus Percussion Ensemble. She has performed at the Salzburg Festival, Mostly Mozart Festival, Santa Fe Festival, La Jolla Summerfest, Mondsee Festival Musiktage Mondsee, Spoleto Festival in Italy, Accademia Chigiana, Davos Festival, Interlaken Festival, Kuhmo Festival, Rheingau Musik Festival, Moritzburg Festival, Augsburg Festival), and by personal inviatation of Seiji Ozawa, at the Saito Kinen Festival. Piccinini is also a Resident artist at the Marlboro Festival in Vermont, and a frequent guest artist at the Aspen Music Festival.

Piccinini's career was launched when she won first prize in the CBC Young Performers Competition in Canada, and a year later, first prize in New York's Concert Artists Guild International Competition. She was cited by Musical America as a "Young Artist to Watch", and in 1991 she became the first flutist to win the coveted Avery Fisher Career Grant from Lincoln Center. She has been the recipient of numerous awards and grants including twice the NEA's Solo Recitalist Grant, the McMeen-Smith Award, the BP Artists Career Award, and various grants from the Canada Council. She was also the winner in the New York Flute Club competition and the National Arts Club Competition.

Since 2021 she serves as Professor of Flute at the Peabody Institute of the Johns Hopkins University in Baltimore and was previously also professor at the Hochschule für Musik, Theater und Medien Hannover. She is the founder and director of MPIMC (Marina Piccinini international Masterclasses) and a frequent guest at masterclasses around the world.

== Commissions ==
Piccinini has commissioned and premiered over 40 pieces by leading composers, including concertos and other pieces by Paquito D'Rivera (Gran Danzon), John Harbison ("Flute Concerto"; Mark the Date). Aaron Jay Kernis (Flute Concerto; "Siren"), Christopher Theofanidis (The Universe in Ecstatic Motion), Kalevi Aho (Concerto for Flute and Harp) Miguel Kertsman (Concerto for Flute, Strings and Percussion), Matthew Hindson (House Music), David Ludwig ("Canzoniere"), Marc-Andre Dalbavie ("Nocturne"), Tebogo Monnakgotla (Flute Concerto Ocean's Blues; it is the lark that sings...), Michael Colgrass (Crossworlds- a double concerto for flute and piano, The Wild Riot of the Shamans Dreams, A Flute in the Kingdom of Drums and Bells), Peter-Paul Koprowski (A Sonnet for Laura), Jon Kimura Parker (Pan Dreams), Toshio Hosokawa (Arabesque), Lukas Foss, Michael Torke, and Roberto Sierra.

== Recordings ==
Piccinini has released several CDs including her own transcription of the complete Paganini Caprices (Avie Records) with an accompanying publication on Schott Music, and a double CD set of the complete flute sonatas of J. S. Bach (including the Solo Partita) in collaboration with the Brasil Guitar Duo (Avie). Other recordings include two collaboration with pianist Andreas Haefliger of the Sonatas of Prokofiev, Franck and Pierre Boulez (Avie and Coinosseur Society), "Belle Époque (Paris, 1880–1913)" with pianist Anne Epperson, (Claves) and a disc with pianist Eva Kupiec of sonatas by Bartok, Martinu, Schulhoff, Dohnányi, and Taktakishvili (Claves). Concerto recordings include the Kernis Flute Concerto with Leonard Slatkin (Naxos), the Kerstman Concerto with the London Philharmonic and Dennis Russel-Davis, and an upcoming release of the Theofanidis Concerto with the Boston Modern Orchestra Project and Gil Rose. She also appears on a Belevedere label video of Pierrot Lunaire (The Solar-Plexus of Modernism), taken from a live performance at the Salzburg Festival.

== Pedagogue ==
Since 2001, Piccinini has served as Professor of flute at the Peabody Institute of the Johns Hopkins University in Baltimore. From 2014 to 2017 she was also a full professor at the Hochschule für Musik, Theater und Medien Hannover in Germany.

She is the founder and director of the Marina Piccinini International Masterclasses. From 2008 to 2016, MPIMC was held at the Peabody institute. In 2017 they began a new relationship with the New World Symphony and consequently the classes were held at the New World Center in Miami Beach. In 2020, due to the corona virus pandemic, MPIMC moved to an online platform, creating MPIMC Online. In 2022 MPIMC began yet another relationship, hosting live classes at the Potash Hill Campus of the Marlboro Music Festival and School. In 2023 MPIMC hosted a mini Pop-Up Online session "All about Auditions" and since then has held the summer masterclasses in the Swiss Alps in Kanton Uri

Piccinini has given masterclasses around the world in various institutions, events and festivals . Unitil 2006 she was the flute professor at the Muraltengut Stiftung für Musik in Zurich, Switzerland.

== Zauberklang ==
In 2023, together with her husband Andreas Haefliger, they established the concert music series Zauberklang in Kanton Uri, Switzerland, with a vision to bring reurbinazation to region by decentralization. To date guest artists have included such esteemed artists as Emanuel Ax, Hilary Hahn, Avie Avital, Ian Bostridge and composer Reena Esmail, among others.

== Personal life ==
Piccinini is married to pianist Andreas Haefliger and they have one daughter. They resided permanently in New York City until 2002 when they relocated to Vienna after being traumatized by the September 11 terrorist attacks, but still maintain a home in New York City and Switzerland. Piccinini is a 36th generation Shaolin Warrior Monk. In 2023 she was named a Cultural Ambassador to Canton Uri in Switzerland.
