= Andreas Haefliger =

German-Swiss pianist (born 1962)

Andreas Haefliger (born September 11, 1962) is a German-born Swiss pianist.

== Early life and education ==
Andreas Haefliger
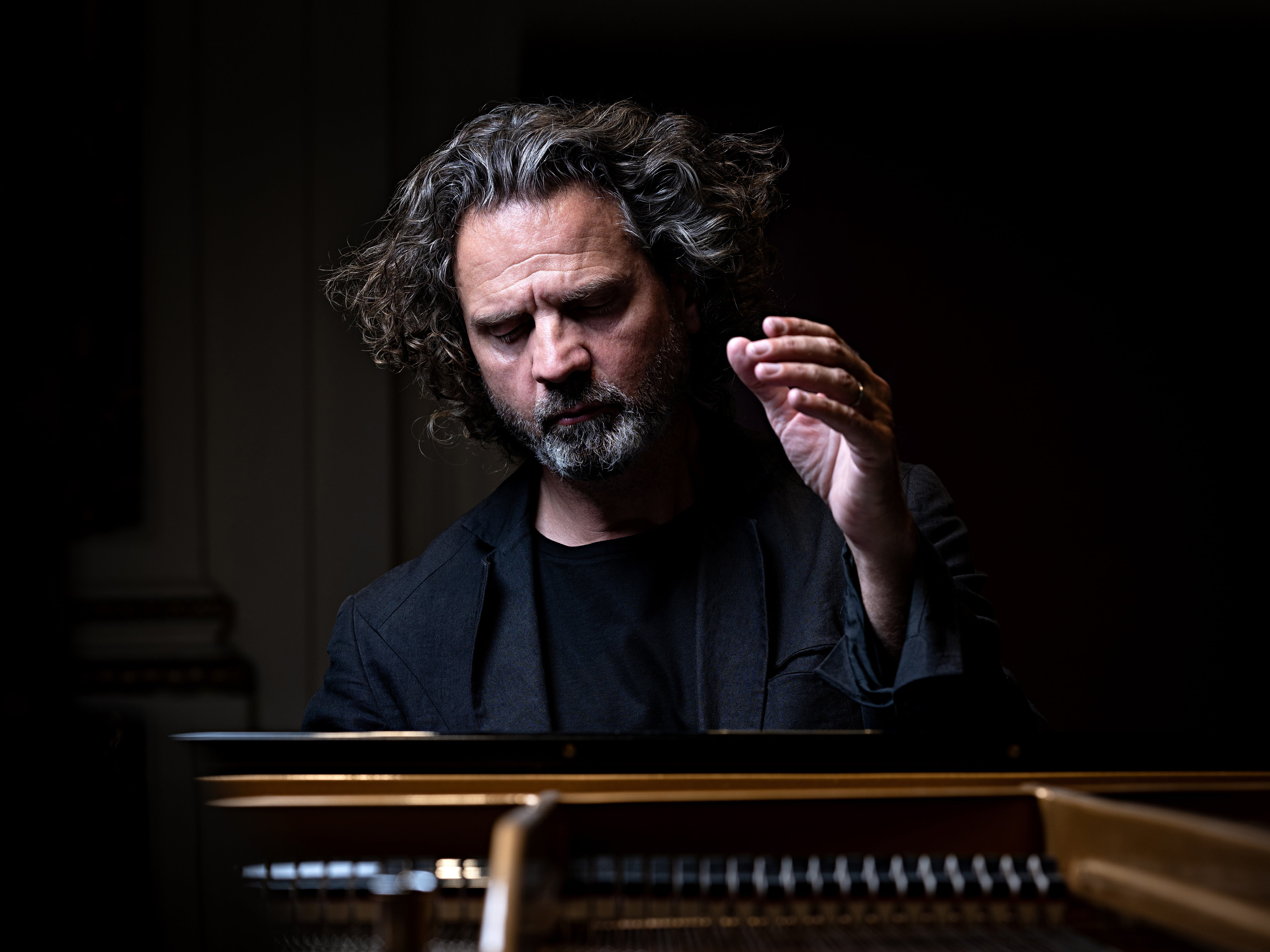
- Born: September 11, 1962 (age 63); Berlin
- Citizenship: Switzerland
- Occupation: Swiss Pianist
- Known for: Piano Music, Beethoven Perspectives
- Spouse: Marina Piccinini
- Parent(s): Ernst Haefliger & Anna Golin
- Awards: Gina Bachauer Scholarship(Twice)
- Website: https://andreashaefliger.net/

Born in Berlin on September 11, 1962, Haefliger is the youngest son of famed tenor Ernst Haefliger and interior designer and architect Anna Golin. He grew up in Berlin until the age of eight, when the family relocated to Munich, Germany. At the age of 15, Haefliger moved to New York City.

A musically precocious child, Andreas began playing the piano before his fourth birthday, studying with Elisabeth Dounias-Sindermann and started performing publicly at age six. At age 12 he was accepted as the only non-college-aged student in the class of Hans Leygraf at the Mozarteum Salzburg. Since an early age he was surrounded by intense vocal artistry, being required to accompany his father's students, thereby acquiring the beginnings of what would become a highly individual vocal piano sound, and a sense of natural lyricism in his music-making.

At age 15, Andreas moved to New York City where he enrolled in the Pre-College division of the Juilliard School in the class of Herbert Stessin. During this time he also finished his High school studies at the Professional Children's School. He continued his studies with William Masselos at the Juilliard School, earning both a Bachelors and a master's degree. During his time there he was twice awarded the Gina Bachauer Scholarship and was the winner of the Concerto Competition, performing Brahms Concerto No. 1 at Alice Tully Hall in the Lincoln Center.

== Career ==
Andreas Haefliger has performed with virtually every major orchestra in the world, including the New York Philharmonic, the Chicago Symphony Orchestra, the Cleveland Orchestra, the Boston Symphony, the Los Angeles Philharmonic, the Pittsburgh Symphony, the San Francisco Symphony, the London Symphony Orchestra, the Royal Concertgebouw Orchestra, the Philharmonia Orchestra, the Orchestre de Paris, the Budapest Festival Orchestra, the Bavarian Radio Symphony Orchestra, the Munich Philharmonic, the Vienna Symphony, the Deutsche Sinfonieorchester Berlin, the Leipzig Gewandhaus, the NHK Symphony Orchestra and the Hong Kong Philharmonic.

He has collaborated with such conductors as Christoph von Dohnanyi, Herbert Blomstedt, Riccardo Chailly, Christian Thielemann, Sir Andrew Davis, Donald Runnicles, Jonathan Nott, Susanna Mälkki, Lorin Maazel, Myung-whun Chung, Marin Alsop, Sakari Oramo, Charles Dutoit, Ludovic Morlot and Jukka-Pekka Saraste.

His solo recitals span a wide range of repertoire, and he is celebrated for his innovative and curatorial approach to programming. He has won many plaudits for his Beethoven Perspectives recital programmes in concert at major halls and festivals worldwide, including at Carnegie Hall, the Berliner Philharmonie, the Wiener Konzerthaus, and at the Salzburg, Lucerne, Edinburgh, Ravinia and Aspen Festivals. Since his solo recital debut at the Wigmore Hall in 1992, he enjoys a particularly close relationship with that venue that includes his activities as soloist, chamber musician, and vocal recital partner.

After the Covid-pandemic lockdown of 2020, Haefliger joined violinist Hilary Hahn in a highly acclaimed series of Beethoven Sonatas recitals in Europe and the US, including Vienna's Konzerthaus, La Fenice in Italy, Chicago's Symphony Hall, the Kennedy Center, and Wigmore Hall. Other important partnerships in concert and on CD have been with the Takacs Quartet, Marina Piccinini, and the baritone Matthias Goerne.

Haefliger's interest in contemporary music has resulted in several new commissions including a Double Concerto for flute and piano by Michael Colgrass and the Boston Symphony Orchestra, and most recently, a highly successful piano concerto, Gran Toccata by Dieter Ammann. This high caliber virtuostic concerto can be heard on his first ever concerto disc with Susanna Malkki and the Helsinki Philharmonic, coupled with Bartok and Ravel concerti. It was co-commissioned for Haefliger by the BBC Proms, together with the Boston Symphony, the Wiener Konzerthaus, Munich Philharmonic, Taipei Symphony and Lucerne Festival, where in August 2022 he gave the Swiss premiere, accompanied by Susanna Malkki and the Helsinki Philharmonic (also touring to the Edinburgh Festival).

== Recordings ==
Haefliger is known for his recordings of Beethoven, particularly in his “Perspectives” series, where he performed the complete solo works of Beethoven alongside works by other composers from Mozart to Ligeti.

- Piano Concertos:Ammann, Ravel and Bartók - Andreas Haefliger, Helsinki Philharmonic Orchestra, Susanna Mälkki, conductor- (BIS-2310)
- Perspectives 7: Beethoven Piano Sonata No.28 / Mussorgsky Picture from an Exhibition/ Liszt Légende No.1 / Berg Piano Sonata- (BIS-2307)
- Perspectives 6: Beethoven Piano Sonata No.10, Op.14 / Piano Sonata No.30, Op.109/ Berio Erdenklavier & Wasserklavier / Luftklavier & Feuerklavier/ Schumann Fantasy in C major, Op.17 (AVIE Records)
- Perspectives 5: Beethoven Piano Sonata No. 29 in B-flat major, Op.106 'Hammerklavier' / Liszt Les Années de pèlerinage: 1° années – Suisse (AVIE Records)
- Perspectives 4: Janáček Piano Sonata No. 1 'In the Street' / Beethoven Piano Sonata No. 21 in C major Op. 53 'Waldstein' / Beethoven Piano Sonata No. 24 in F major Op.78 / Brahms Piano Sonata No. 2 in F minor Op.2 (AVIE Records)
- Perspectives 3: Beethoven Piano Sonata No.15 in D major Op. 28 'Pastoral' / Beethoven Piano Sonata No.23 in F minor Op. 57 'Appassionata' / Schubert Piano Sonata No.21 in B flat major D.960 (AVIE Records)
- Perspectives 2: Beethoven Piano Sonata No.22 in F major, Op.54 / Bartók Out of Doors / Beethoven Piano Sonata No.27 in E minor, op.90 / Brahms Piano Sonata No.3 in F minor, Op.5 (AVIE Records)
- Perspectives 1: Schubert Piano Sonata in A minor, D.537 / Adès Darknesse Visible / Mozart Piano Sonata No. 17 in B flat major, KV.570 / Beethoven Piano Sonata No. 32 in C minor, Op. 111 (AVIE Records)
- Dvorak: Piano Quintet in A. op. 81- Andreas Haefliger, piano / Takács Quartet (DECCA)
- Schubert: Notturno D.897- Andreas Haefliger, piano / Takács Quartet (DECCA)
- Schubert: Trout Quintet- Andreas Haefliger, piano / Takács Quartet (DECCA)

== Critical acclaim ==
- Hilary Hahn/Andreas Haefliger review — a capacity crowd-acclaimed blissful Beethoven
- Tokyo String Quartet/Haefliger – review
- Sex and the symphony | Culture | The Guardian
- Prom 61: Singapore Symphony Orchestra/Shui – a tour de force for Haefliger
- Classical interview: Andreas Haefliger on recreating a historic Beethoven concert
- Lucerne Festival: An den Grenzen der Wahrnehmung schillert die Musik
- Dieter Ammann's Piano Concerto is a stunner and confirms its legendary reputation
- Intermusica Reviews | Artist- Andreas Haefliger
- The Boston Globe - At BSO, an American premiere bookended by French classics
- BARCELONA / A Herculean Haefliger for Brahms

"... one to take risks, which make him a fascinating artist" The Guardian

A profound visionary -Klassik Heute

For his part, Haefliger inhabited the solo part, charging through the often percussive writing with technique and rhythmic energy. His playing was galvanizing rather than depleted by the score's soloistic demands The Boston Globe.

== Personal life ==
Andreas Haefliger is the youngest son of famed tenor Ernst Haefliger and interior designer Anna Golin. He is married to the flautist Marina Piccinini, and they have one daughter. He grew up in Berlin and Munich before moving to New York at age 15. In 2002 he relocated to Vienna, and currently makes the mountains of central Switzerland his home, where he was named as a Cultural Ambassador to the Canton Uri.
