= Giuseppe Modugno =

Italian pianist

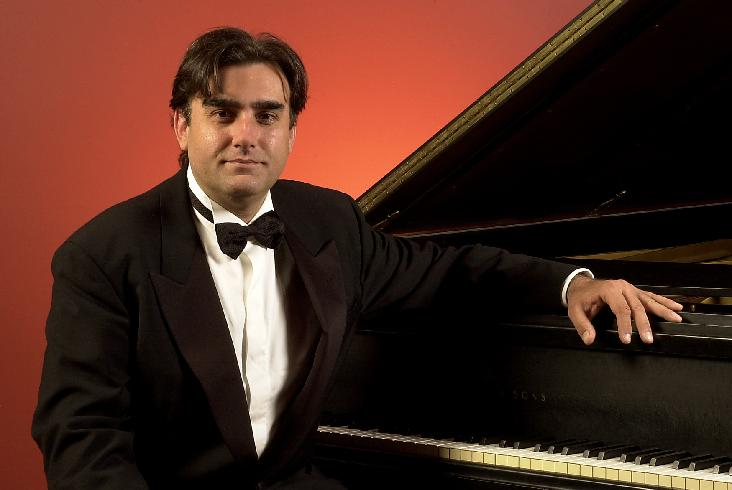
Giuseppe Fausto Modugno

Giuseppe Fausto Modugno (born 1960) is an Italian pianist.

== Biography ==
Modugno is a soloist and a lecturer, and is internationally active as a concert pianist.

He has won seven national competitions and two international competitions as soloist and as duettist. He has enjoyed success both as a soloist and playing with an orchestra, and he habitually plays in the major concert halls in Italy and abroad. He has recorded for the RAI broadcasting company and has been on tours to Russia, Germany, Spain, the United States, Japan and other countries, playing in prestigious venues and major concert halls. Since 2001 he has been regularly invited by the University of California to give Master classes and concerts both as a soloist and with chamber ensembles.

He completed his piano studies at the school of Franco Scala, where he had the chance to work with Joerg Demus, Nikita Magaloff, Bruno Canino and Antonio Ballista among others. In 1983 he attended the course of the Accademia Chigiana in Siena in Guido Agosti's class, not only obtaining his diploma but also gaining a grant as one of the best players. In 1984 he specialized in piano duets with Antonio Ballista at Città di Castello, and at the Festival delle Nazioni he won the award for best pupil.

From 2004 to 2007 was artistic secretary for the ‘Orchestra Mozart’ directed by Claudio Abbado (www.orchestramozart.com) and is currently manager of the "Orchestra Mozart Academy" (www.accademiaorchestramozart.it). For years he has been passionately involved, both at the Accademia Filarmonica of Bologna and in other prestigious musical academies, in preparing series of conferences and concert-conferences which he frequently gives on composers and on the historical and aesthetic background to major classical works. He has appeared on many occasions on RAI TV programmes with Corrado Augias, both playing as well as illustrating the music he plays. Since 2003 he has been Artistic Director and Teacher of Music Summer Courses at the “Campus degli Incamminati” in Modigliana (www.incamminati.com).

He holds the post of Professor of Principal piano at the Musical academy "Vecchi-Tonelli" in Modena.

== Recordings ==
- Nuova Era, CD with the complete works for piano-four hands by F. Mendelssohn with Alberto Spinelli
- Tactus, CD with music by Stefano Golinelli.
- Tactus, CD with music by Stefano Liverani.
- [[Ermitage (record label)|Ermitage]], CD with the complete works for piano-four hands by W.A. Mozart, CD with Sonatas for cello and piano by Johannes Brahms
- Concerto un CD with music by F.J. Haydn
- Repubblica, a series of 16 DVD about classical music with Corrado Augias

== Related voices ==
- Accademia Filarmonica di Bologna
- Franco Scala
