= Ernst Haefliger =

Swiss tenor

- Haefliger, in the 1950s
- Born: 6 July 1919; Davos, Switzerland
- Died: 17 March 2007 (aged 87); Davos, Switzerland
- Education: Zürich Conservatory
- Occupation: Tenor
- Relatives: Andreas Haefliger (son)

Ernst Haefliger (6 July 1919 – 17 March 2007) was a Swiss tenor.

External audio
- You may hear Ernst Haefliger singing the role of "Tamino" in Wolfgang Amadeus Mozart's opera Die Zauberflöte K. 620 with the RIAS Symphony Orchestra conducted by Ferenc Fricsay in 1955 Here on archive.org

== Biography ==
Haefliger was born in Davos, Switzerland, on 6 July 1919 and studied at the Wettinger Seminary and the Zürich Conservatory. He later studied with Fernando Carpi in Geneva and with the tenor Julius Patzak in Vienna. He concentrated on lieder and choral works.

Haefliger first sang the Evangelist in Bach's St John Passion in Zürich in 1943. After this debut he was engaged for concerts in Switzerland and, after World War II, abroad. Fricsay engaged him for the Salzburg Festival, where Haefliger's international career began in 1949 with the role of Tiresias in Carl Orff's opera Antigonae. The same year at Salzburg he sang the First Armed Man in Die Zauberflöte conducted by Wilhelm Furtwängler.

In 1952 he joined Fricsay at the Deutsche Oper Berlin, where he sang the tenor roles in all of Mozart's operas, in Rossini's The Barber of Seville and Le comte Ory, in Pfitzner's Palestrina, and Hans in Smetana's The Bartered Bride, among others.

He made his Boston debut in 1965 in the Peabody Mason Concert series. He recorded lieder, oratorios and operas for Angel, Columbia, Vanguard and Philips Records. Deutsche Grammophon issued a 12-CD set, The Art of Ernst Haefliger, with repertoire from J. S. Bach to Janáček, including Schubert's three song cycles.

From 1971 to 1988 he taught at the Hochschule für Musik in Munich. He also gave master classes in Zürich, Japan and the United States, and wrote the book Die Singstimme (Bern, 1983).

== Personal life ==
Haefliger died of acute decompensated heart failure in Davos on 17 March 2007, aged 87. The pianist Andreas Haefliger is his son.

== Awards ==
- Berliner Kammersänger
- Officer's Cross of the Order of Merit of the Federal Republic of Germany
