= Carlo Maria Badini =

Italian arts administrator (1925–2007)

Carlo Maria Badini (2 June 1925, in Bologna – 19 April 2007, in Bologna) was a renowned Italian arts administrator. From 1964 to 1977 he was the Sovrintendente or General Manager of the Teatro Comunale di Bologna and from 1977 through 1990 he was the Sovrintendente of La Scala. Badini created controversy as a result of the unorthodox methods he used to revitalize La Scala's finances, which had reportedly reached a 2.8 million dollar (US) deficit, such as the introduction of television cameras to record performances and allowing advertisements on the programmes. These innovations allowed the opera house to emerge from the deficit within two years of their implementation. Upon his 1990 departure from La Scala, Badini continued work in the Italian artistic community, becoming chairman of the National Theatre Organization in Italy and co-founding the Mozart Orchestra in Bologna, which he formed alongside former La Scala music director Claudio Abbado.
