= Peter Seabourne =

English composer (born 1960)

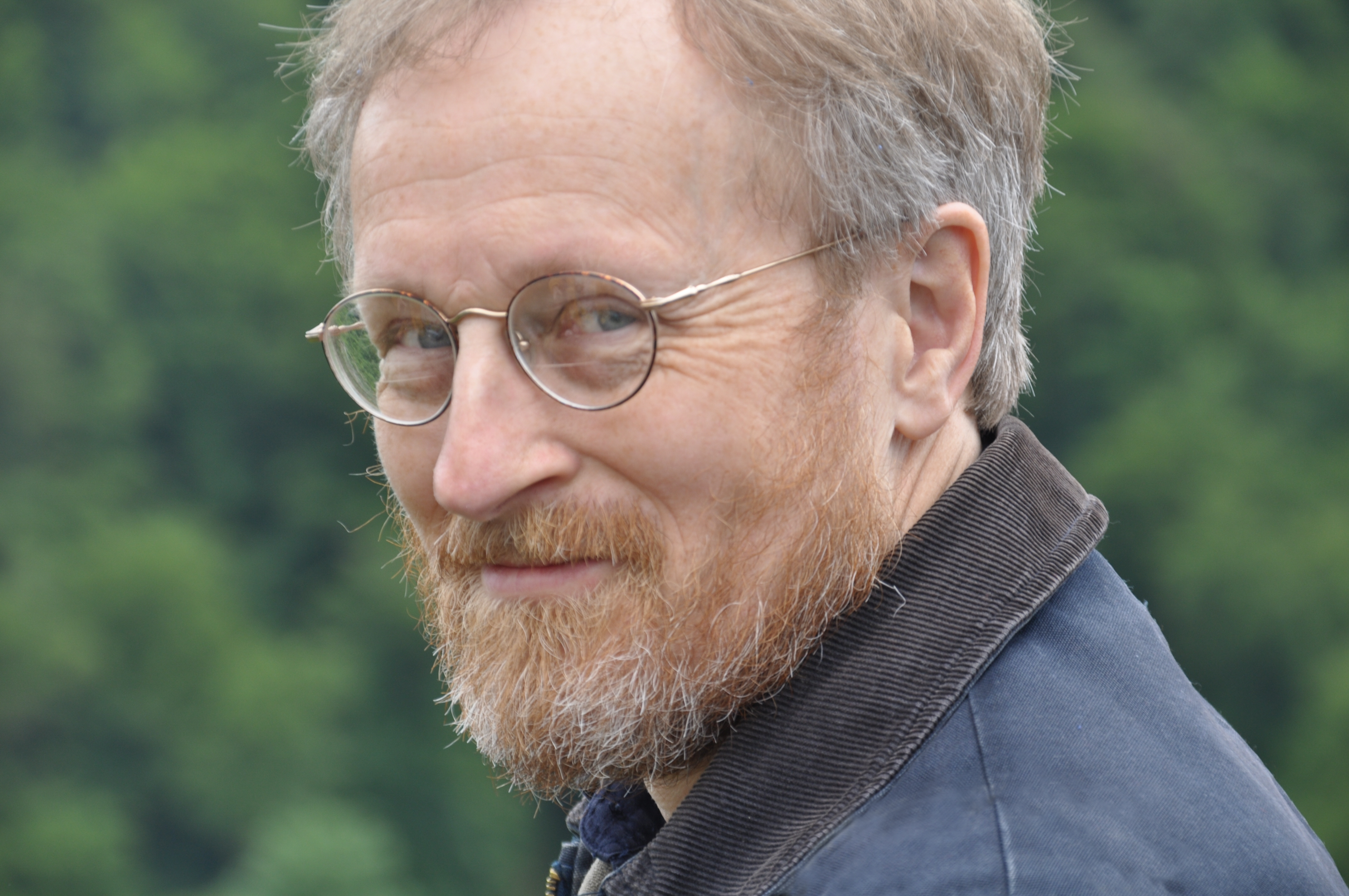
Peter Seabourne – composer

Peter Seabourne (born 1960) is an English contemporary classical composer based in Lincolnshire, England.

== Biography ==
Seabourne studied at Clare College, Cambridge with Robin Holloway, and University of York with David Blake.

In 1984 he was joint winner of the Overseas League Composition Competition, and was second in the Benja min Britten Prize in 1986. In his student years works were performed in the Camden, York, Huddersfield, Cambridge and Devizes Festivals and three times in the Purcell Room on London's South Bank, by Lontano, Tapestry, Endymion, and others.

Around 1989 he abandoned composition, feeling a growing separation with the new music world, and doubting his technique and voice. He remained silent for some 12 years and rejected all his work to date.

In 2001 he resumed composition, rapidly creating a large number of pieces. Since this time he has been awarded several times in international competitions. In 2004 his 1st Piano Concerto won 3rd Prize and joint-orchestra prize in the 1st International Uuno Klami Composition Competition in Finland. In the same year he took 3rd prize in the Ivan Spassov competition in Bulgaria with Soaring. In 2005 his song cycle Sappho Songs was highly commended in the IMRO International Competition in Ireland, and the following year his Soaring took 1st prize. Also in 2006 his septet My River was selected by North/South Consonance Ensemble from over two hundred scores and performed in New York City.

Seabourne's catalogue includes seven symphonies, seven concerti and eleven large piano cycles called Steps. His work has been commissioned by the Rio International Cello Festival (On the blue shore of silence 2007), Rheinische Philharmonie/Daniel Raiskin (Tu Sospiri? 2010), Paul Klee Zentrum/Kaspar Zehnder (Storyteller for solo double bass and ensemble 2011), Moravská Filharmonie/Ondrej Vrabec (Double Concerto for Horn and Orchestra 2011), Coull Quartet (Accept these few roses 2011), Vestfold Festival/Henning Kraggerud, Spalding Flower Festival (Mille Fiori for four trumpets 2011), Norfolk Concerts and Douglas Gowan (String Quintet 2012), Deutsche Kammerakademie Neuss am Rhein (Violin Concerto 2016) and Musica Nova Reutlingen (Freeing the Angel – viola/piano 2019).

The Italian label Sheva Contemporary has issued nineteen CDs of the composer's work. They have been reviewed in Gramophone Magazine, BBC Music Magazine, The Strad, Musical Opinion in the UK, and elsewhere. Further works are included on SIMAX (Norway), Da Vinci (Japan), Sheva Collection (Italy) and Willowhayne Records (UK).

== Compositional style ==
Seabourne's work has roots in the neo-Romantic tradition, with influences from Janáček, Mahler, Ravel, Prokofiev, Sibelius, Carl Nielsen and Robin Holloway. However his musical language is distinctively idiosyncratic, with its own modernity. It is particularly "inventive with regard to rhythm" and hovers on the edge of tonality.

== List of works ==
=== Orchestral ===
- The Darkness of Ages, poem for orchestra – 12′ – 2001 rev. 2009
- Piano Concerto No. 1 – 28′ – 2004 rev. 2006
- Scherzo Serioso – 10′ – 2005 (also as arrangement for 2 pianos 2014)
- Piano Concerto No. 2 – 25′ – 2006 (première Kristina Stepasjuková, piano, with Ondřej Vrabec and the Academy Orchestra of the Czech Philharmonic March 2016)
- Tu Sospiri? – 13′ – 2010
- Double Concerto for Horn and Orchestra – 23′ – 2011
- Cor Anglais Concerto – 26′ – 2013
- Symphony of Roses – 32′ – 2014 (première Biel-Bienne May 2016 Sinfonie Orchester Biel Solothurn conducted by Kaspar Zehnder)
- Symphony No. 2 – 45′ – 2014
- Symphony No. 3 – 33′ – 2016
- Violin Concerto – solo violin and strings – dur 30′ – 2003–2016
- Symphony No. 4 – 33′ – 2017
- Piano Concerto No. 3 – 27′ – 2018
- Viola Concerto – 30′ – 2020
- Symphony No. 5 – Sea of Life – 18½′ – 2021
- Bitten! – Tarantella for orchestra – 6′ – 2022
- Symphony No. 6 – 24′ – 2022
- Symphony No. 7 – 36′ – 2026

=== Chamber/ensemble ===
- A Music Beginning for violin/piano – 11′ – 2001 (première Stamford International Chamber Music Festival 2005 – Andrew Smith/Wayman Chin)
- The Sadness of the King for septet (clt. bsn. hrn. 2vln. vla. pno) – 13′ – 2002
- Child's Play... for wind quintet – 30′ – 2003 and 2006 (one movement also arranged as scherzo for octet (clt. bsn. hrn. 2vln. vla. vc. cb) and for chamber orchestra dur. 5′)
- Soaring for oboe and piano (also as an arrangement for oboe and string quartet) – 12′ – 2003 (première Arklow Festival – Chris Redgate/Mary Dullea 2006), (2nd movement première Naomi Ozawa, Pam Yan Los Angeles 2014)
- accept these few roses... for string quartet – 10′ – 2005/2011
- My River for septet (flt. ob. clt. vln. vla. vc. pno.) – 10′ – 2005
- Autumnal Dances for clarinet and piano – 17′
- Pietà for viola and piano – 29′ – 2007
- On the Blue Shore of Silence for cello and piano – 23′ – 2007
- Adrift! (Chamber Concerto No. 1) for dectet (flt/picc. ob. clt. bsn. hrn. 2vln. vla. vc. cb.) – 16′ – 2008
- Phantasy Caprices (Chamber Concerto No. 2) for dectet (flt. ob. clt. bsn. hrn. vln. vla. vc. cb. pNo.) – 18′ – 2009
- Last Dance for piano trio – 7′ – 2010 (première Philharmonic Hall, Lviv 2010 – Ostap and Olga Shutko, Myroslav Dragan). Also played in King's Lynn Festival, UK
- Storyteller (Chamber Concerto No. 3) for solo double bass with fl. ob. clt. bsn. hrn. vln. vc. pno – 12′ – 2010
- A Portrait and Four Nocturnes for violin and piano – 19′ – 2010
- String Quintet for 2 vlns, vla, 2 vc – 25′ – 2011
- Sonata Appassionata for violin and cello – 21′ – 2012
- The Black Pegasus, rhapsody for horn and piano – 13′ – 2018
- Piano Trio for violin, cello and piano – 24′ – 2018
- Encounters, five short duets for two horns – 8′ – 2019
- Freeing the Angel for viola and piano – 7′ – 2019
- Gran Partita for wind octet (2 oboes, 2 clarinets, 2 horns, 2 bassoons) – 30′ – 2019
- Fall for horn and string quartet – 22′ – 2020
- Clarinet Quintet for clarinet and string quartet – 24′ – 2023

=== Solo ===
- Steps, piano cycle
  1. 12 Collected Pieces for Piano – c. 85′ – 2001–06
  2. Studies of Invention – 48′ – 2006–07
  3. Arabesques – 35′ – 2008–12 (première Clothworkers Hall, Leeds 2014)
  4. Libro di Canti Italiano – 50′ – 2009–11
  5. Sixteen Scenes before a Crucifixion – 50′ – 2013–14
  6. Toccatas and Fantasias – 50′ – 2016–17
  7. Dances on the Head of a Pin – 49′ – 2018–19
  8. My Song in October – 46′ – 2020–21
  9. Les Fleurs de la Maladie – 50′ – 2020–21
  10. In a Grain of Sand – 56′ – 2022–23
  11. The Curious Diary of Mr Doyle – 43′ – 2024
- Persephone for harp – 4′ – 2004
- Møte for solo violin – 5′ – 2010
- Threads for solo violin – 18′ – 2017
- Julie Dances for solo horn – 9 minutes – 2020
- Going for solo horn – 2′ – 2020
- then for solo viola – 5′ – 2020

=== Song and vocal ===
- September, Just Septembers, 9 settings of Emily Dickinson (soprano and piano) dur. 18′ – 2002
- Sappho Songs, 4 settings of Sappho in French Translations by Renée Vivien (soprano and piano) dur. 8′ − 2002
- Moon Beyond the White Clouds, 4 settings of classical Chinese texts in English (soprano and piano) dur. 8′ – 2003
- The Garden in the Brain, 7 Songs to words of Emily Dickinson (soprano and piano) – 13′ – 2003 (also exists in an instrumental version for alto sax and piano)
- There was a Maid, carol for SATB + organ – 4′ – Commissioned by Repton School, Derbyshire – 2003
- Sea Song, 6-word opera for (sop. bar. clt. vc. sus-cym. pno) – 2′
- Sonnets to Orpheus, Eleven settings of Rainer Maria Rilke for mezzo-soprano and piano – 35′ – 2013
- Orpheus. Eurydike. Hermes., scena setting Rainer Maria Rilke for mezzo-soprano and chamber orchestra – 28′ – 2004–2016
- Called Back, 10 settings of Emily Dickinson for soprano and piano – 20′ – 2022

== Recordings ==
- Steps Volume 1: An Anthology for Piano – Minjeong Shin, piano – Sheva Contemporary SH168 (review in The Classical Reviewer)
- Steps Volume 2: Studies of Invention – Giovanni Santini, piano – Sheva Contemporary SH065 (reviews in Music-Web international 2013, Gramophone 2013))
- Steps Volume 3: Arabesques – Michael Bell, piano – Sheva Contemporary SH088 (review in Gramophone 2013)
- Steps Volume 4: Libro di Canti Italiano – Fabio Menchetti, piano – Sheva Contemporary SH104 (review in Gramophone)
- Steps Volume 5: Sixteen Scenes Before a Crucifixion Alessandro Viale piano – Sheva Contemporary SH136 (reviews in Gramophone and The Classical Reviewer)
- Sonata Appassionata; A music beginning; On the blue shore of silence – Ostap Shutko, violin; Olga Shutko, 'cello; Myroslav Dragan, piano – Sheva Contemporary SH082
- This is a song for you alone (later revised and expanded, beco ming Violin Concerto) – Irina Borissova, violin, with Mainzer Virtuosi, conductor Dmitry Khakhalin – SH091 (review in Gramophone 2015)
- Møte (Meeting) from The Munch Suite – Henning Kraggerud, violin – SIMAX) (review in The Independent)
- Pietà – Georg Hamann, viola, and Akari Komiya, piano – Sheva Contemporary SH137 VIOLA DOLOROSA (reviews in The Strad) 2015 The Classical Reviewer)
- Threads – Alberto Bologni, violin – Sheva Contemporary SH184 (review in Art Music Lounge)
- The Garden in the Brain (arrangement of song cycle) – Valentina Renesto, alto saxophone, and Giuseppe Bruno, piano – Da Vinci C00174
- A Portrait and Four Nocturnes – Irina Borissova, violin, and Giacomo Battarino, piano – Sheva Contemporary SH226 (review in Limelight)
- Mille Fiori, Encounters, The Black Pegasus, Julie Dances – British Music for horn – Ondřej Vrabec, horn – Sheva Contemporary SH241 (reviews in Gramophone, Limelight, BBC Music Magazine)
- Piano Trio – Moments of Vision – Avant Trio (Rebecca Raimondi, violin – Urška Horvat, cello – Alessandro Viale, piano) – Sheva Contemporary SH271 (review in Limelight)
- Trois Petits Adieux – Michael Bell, piano – Sheva Contemporary SH275
- Fall – Horn Quintets – Ondřej Vrabec, horn; Pavel Bořkovec Quartet – Sheva Contemporary SH281 (reviews in Gramophone, BBC Music Magazine, Limelight, Klassisk Musikk)
- Møte – Diversity in Unity – Liza Fediukova, violin – Sheva Collection SH292
- Steps Volume 6: Toccatas and Fantasias – Konstantin Lifschitz, piano – Willowhayne Records WHR073CD
- Steps Volume 8: My Song in October and September, Just Septembers (9 songs to words of Emily Dickinson) – Michael Bell, piano – Karen Radcliffe, soprano – Sheva Contemporary SH326
