= Lucerne Festival Orchestra =

Swiss symphonic orchestra

The Lucerne Festival Orchestra is a European ad hoc seasonal orchestra based at the annual Lucerne Festival in Switzerland.

== History ==
The Lucerne Festival had featured a resident orchestra as far back as 1938, with Arturo Toscanini conducting the first concert of that ensemble. From 1943 until its disbandment in 1993, the festival orchestra consisted primarily of musicians from Switzerland. A few years later, a reconstituted festival orchestra arose, based around players from the Gustav Mahler Jugendorchester and the European Community Youth Orchestra (now the European Union Youth Orchestra).

The most recent incarnation of the Lucerne Festival Orchestra occurred at the instigation of Claudio Abbado, after a conversation in 2000 with Lucerne Festival artistic director Michael Haefliger. The core of the ensemble is the Mahler Chamber Orchestra. The LFO has featured both soloists and orchestral principals from major orchestras in its ranks, including Kolja Blacher, Wolfram Christ, Mirijam Contzen, Diemut Poppen, Natalia Gutman, Jens-Peter Maintz, Jacques Zoon, Reinhold Friedrich, Stefan Dohr, Alessio Allegrini, Mark Templeton, Franz Bartolomey, Alois Posch, Emmanuel Pahud, Albrecht Mayer, Stefan Schweigert, members of the Sabine Meyer Wind Ensemble, the Alban Berg Quartet and Hagen Quartet. The orchestra also includes members of ensembles with whom Abbado had a connection, such as the Berlin Philharmonic Orchestra, the London Symphony Orchestra and the Vienna Philharmonic Orchestra.

Abbado hand-picked the orchestra members, and the musicians assemble at the beginning of each August in Lucerne for a total of three weeks together, with 10 days of rehearsals. Then, the orchestra performs the opening concerts of the festival. One overriding philosophy that Abbado emphasized was for the musicians to listen to each other, as in chamber music, but in the context of a full orchestral ensemble. In the string sections, the section leaders assign the seating, after discussion with Abbado. Rehearsals commence with individual instrument sections before the entire ensemble collects with Abbado.

Abbado led the first performances of the newest Lucerne Festival Orchestra at the 2003 festival. Their first residency abroad in Rome was in the autumn of 2005. October 2006 brought their first overseas guest performance, which gave a concert in Tokyo at Suntory Hall. The orchestra made its first Proms debut in August 2007, with Gustav Mahler's Symphony No. 3. Abbado and the orchestra were scheduled to appear in the US for the first time, at Carnegie Hall in New York City, in October 2007. However, in September 2007, Abbado announced that he had to withdraw from these scheduled New York concerts because of health concerns. The orchestra performed these concerts with substitute conductors Pierre Boulez and David Robertson. For the 2014 Lucerne Festival, Andris Nelsons conducted the festival orchestra's concert as the replacement for Claudio Abbado, who died in January 2014.

In August 2015, the Lucerne Festival announced the appointment of Riccardo Chailly as its next music director, effective with the 2016 Lucerne Festival, with an initial contract of 5 years. In February 2021, the orchestra announced an extension of Chailly's contract as music director through 2026. In December 2025, the orchestra announced a further extension of Chailly's contract through the end of 2028.

== Selected discography ==
=== CDs ===
- Claude Debussy: La Mer, Mahler: Symphony No. 2 (Deutsche Grammophon)
- Anton Bruckner: Symphony No. 9

=== DVDs ===
- Gustav Mahler:
  - Symphony No. 2 (with the Orfeón Donostiarra, Eteri Gvazava and Anna Larsson)
  - Symphony No. 3 (with the Arnold Schoenberg Choir, Tölz Boys Choir, and Anna Larsson)
  - Symphony No. 5
  - Symphony No. 6
  - Symphony No. 7
  - Symphony No. 9
- Claude Debussy: La Mer
