= Claudio Abbado =

Italian conductor (1933–2014)

Senator for life Claudio Abbado
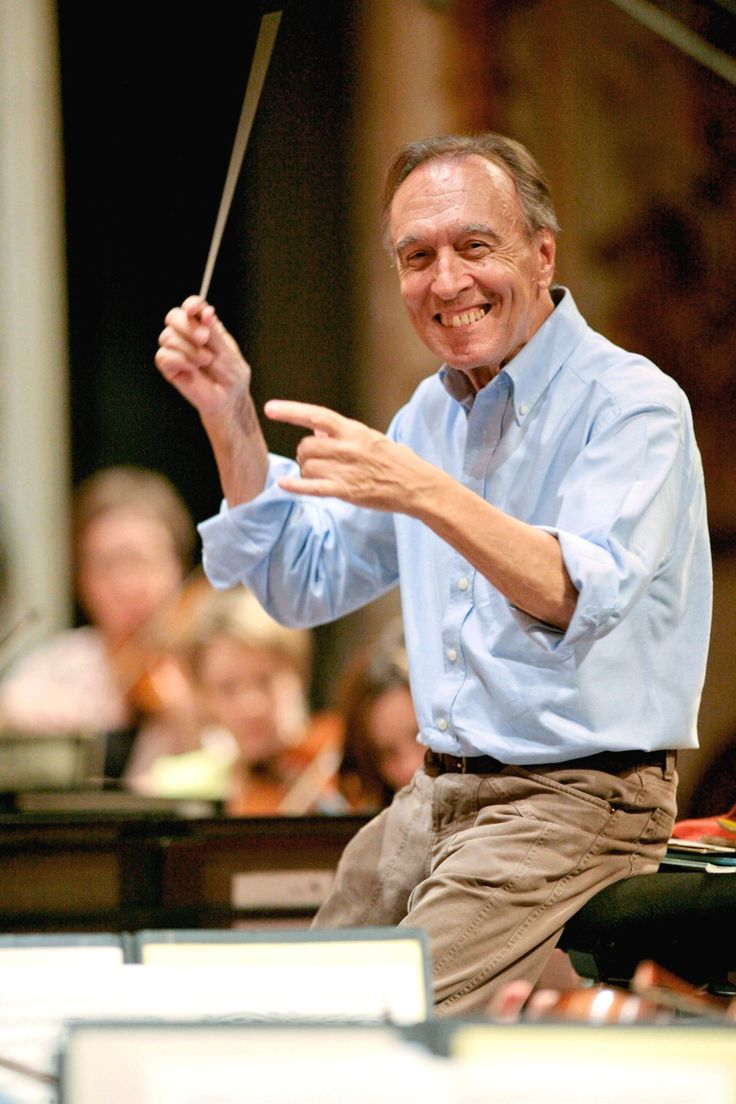
- Abbado in 2006
- Born: 26 June 1933; Milan, Italy
- Died: 20 January 2014 (aged 80); Bologna, Italy
- Organizations: La Scala; Vienna State Opera; VPO; LSO; BPO
- Relatives: Marcello Abbado (brother); Roberto Abbado (nephew)

Member of the Senate of the Republic
- Life tenure 30 August 2013 – 20 January 2014
- Appointed by: Giorgio Napolitano

Claudio Abbado OMRI (Italian pronunciation: [ˈklaudjo abˈbaːdo]; 26 June 1933 – 20 January 2014) was an Italian conductor who was one of the leading conductors of his generation. He served as music director of the La Scala opera house in Milan, principal conductor of the Berlin Philharmonic, principal conductor of the London Symphony Orchestra, principal guest conductor of the Chicago Symphony Orchestra, music director of the Vienna State Opera, founder and director of the Lucerne Festival Orchestra, founder and director of the Mahler Chamber Orchestra, founding artistic director of the Orchestra Mozart and music director of the European Union Youth Orchestra. He was recipient of the Ernst von Siemens Music Prize and Senator for life in Italy.

== Biography ==
=== Early life and background ===
The Abbado family enjoyed both wealth and respect in the community until Abbado's great-grandfather gambled away the family fortune. His son, Abbado's grandfather, Michele Abbado, became a professor of botany at the University of Turin. He re-established the family's reputation and also showed talent as an amateur musician.

Born in Milan, Italy on 26 June 1933, Claudio Abbado was the son of violinist Michelangelo Abbado, and the brother of the musician Marcello Abbado (born 1926). His father, a professional violinist and a professor at the Giuseppe Verdi Conservatory, was his first piano teacher. His mother, Maria Carmela Savagnone, also was an adept pianist. (Marcello Abbado later became a concert pianist, composer, and teacher at the Rossini Conservatory in Pesaro.) His sister also exhibited talent in music but did not pursue a musical career after her marriage. His other brother later became a successful architect.

Abbado's childhood encompassed the Nazi occupation of Milan. During that time, Abbado's mother spent time in prison for harbouring a Jewish child. This period solidified his anti-fascist political sentiments. Claudio himself is known for having a famous anecdote about how when he was just eleven years old he wrote "Viva Bartók" on a local wall which caught the attention of the Gestapo and sent them on the hunt for the culprit. His passionate opposition to fascism continued into his adult years.

During his youth his musical interest developed, attending performances at La Scala as well as orchestral rehearsals in Milan led by such conductors as Arturo Toscanini and Wilhelm Furtwängler. He later recalled how he hated seeing Toscanini in rehearsal. Other conductors who influenced him were Bruno Walter, Josef Krips and Herbert von Karajan. It was upon hearing Antonio Guarnieri's conducting of Claude Debussy's Nocturnes that Abbado resolved to become a conductor himself. At age 15, Abbado first met Leonard Bernstein when Bernstein was conducting a performance featuring Abbado's father as a soloist. Bernstein commented, "You have the eye to be a conductor."

=== Education and early engagements ===
Abbado studied piano, composition, and conducting at the Milan Conservatory, and graduated with a degree in piano in 1955. The following year, he studied conducting with Hans Swarowsky at the Vienna Academy of Music, on the recommendation of Zubin Mehta. Abbado and Mehta both joined the academy chorus to be able to watch such conductors as Bruno Walter and Herbert von Karajan in rehearsal. He also spent time at the Chigiana Academy in Siena.

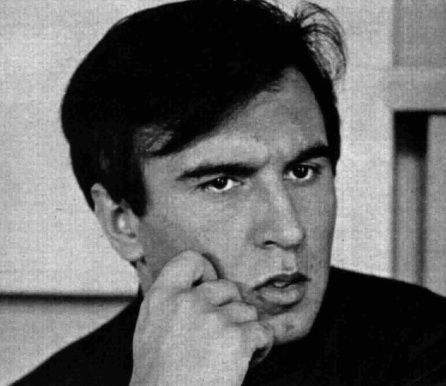
Abbado in 1965

In 1958, Abbado made his conducting debut in Trieste. That summer, he won the international Serge Koussevitzky Competition for conductors at the Tanglewood Music Festival, which resulted in a number of operatic conducting engagements in Italy. In 1959, he conducted his first opera, The Love for Three Oranges, in Trieste. He made his La Scala conducting debut in 1960. In 1963, he won the Dimitri Mitropoulos Prize for conductors, which allowed him to work for five months with the New York Philharmonic as an assistant conductor to Bernstein. Abbado made his New York Philharmonic professional conducting debut on 7 April 1963. A 1965 appearance at the RIAS Festival in Berlin led to an invitation from Herbert von Karajan to the Salzburg Festival the following year to work with the Vienna Philharmonic. In 1965, Abbado made his British debut with the Hallé Orchestra, followed in 1966 by his London Symphony Orchestra (LSO) debut.

Abbado taught chamber music for three years during the early 1960s in Parma.

=== Conducting career ===
In 1969, Abbado became the principal conductor at La Scala. Subsequently, he became the company's music director in 1972. He took the title of joint artistic director, along with Giorgio Strehler and Carlo Maria Badini, in 1976. During his tenure, he extended the opera season to four months, and focused on giving inexpensive performances for the working class and students. In addition to the standard opera repertoire, he presented contemporary operas, including works of Luigi Dallapiccola and of Luigi Nono, in particular, the world premiere of Nono's Al gran sole carico d'amore. In 1976, he brought the La Scala company to the US for its American debut in Washington, D.C. for the American Bicentennial. In 1982, he founded the Filarmonica della Scala for the performance of orchestral repertoire by the house orchestra in concert. Abbado remained affiliated with La Scala until 1986.

On 7 October 1968, Abbado made his debut with the Metropolitan Opera with Don Carlo. He began to work more extensively with the Vienna Philharmonic (VPO) after 1971, which included two engagements as conductor of the orchestra's New Year's Day concert, in 1988 and 1991. He was a recipient of both the Philharmonic Ring and the Golden Nicolai Medal from the Vienna Philharmonic.

He served as principal guest conductor of the London Symphony Orchestra (LSO) from 1975 to 1979 and became its principal conductor in 1979, a post he held until 1987. (He was also the LSO's music director from 1984 until the end of his principal conductor tenure.) From 1982 to 1985, he was principal guest conductor of the Chicago Symphony Orchestra (CSO). In 1986, Abbado became the Generalmusikdirektor (GMD) of the city of Vienna, and in parallel, was music director of the Vienna State Opera from 1986 to 1991. During his tenure as GMD in Vienna, in 1988, he founded the music festival Wien Modern. There he backed numerous contemporary composers including György Ligeti, Pierre Boulez, and Luigi Nono.

==== Berlin Philharmonic ====
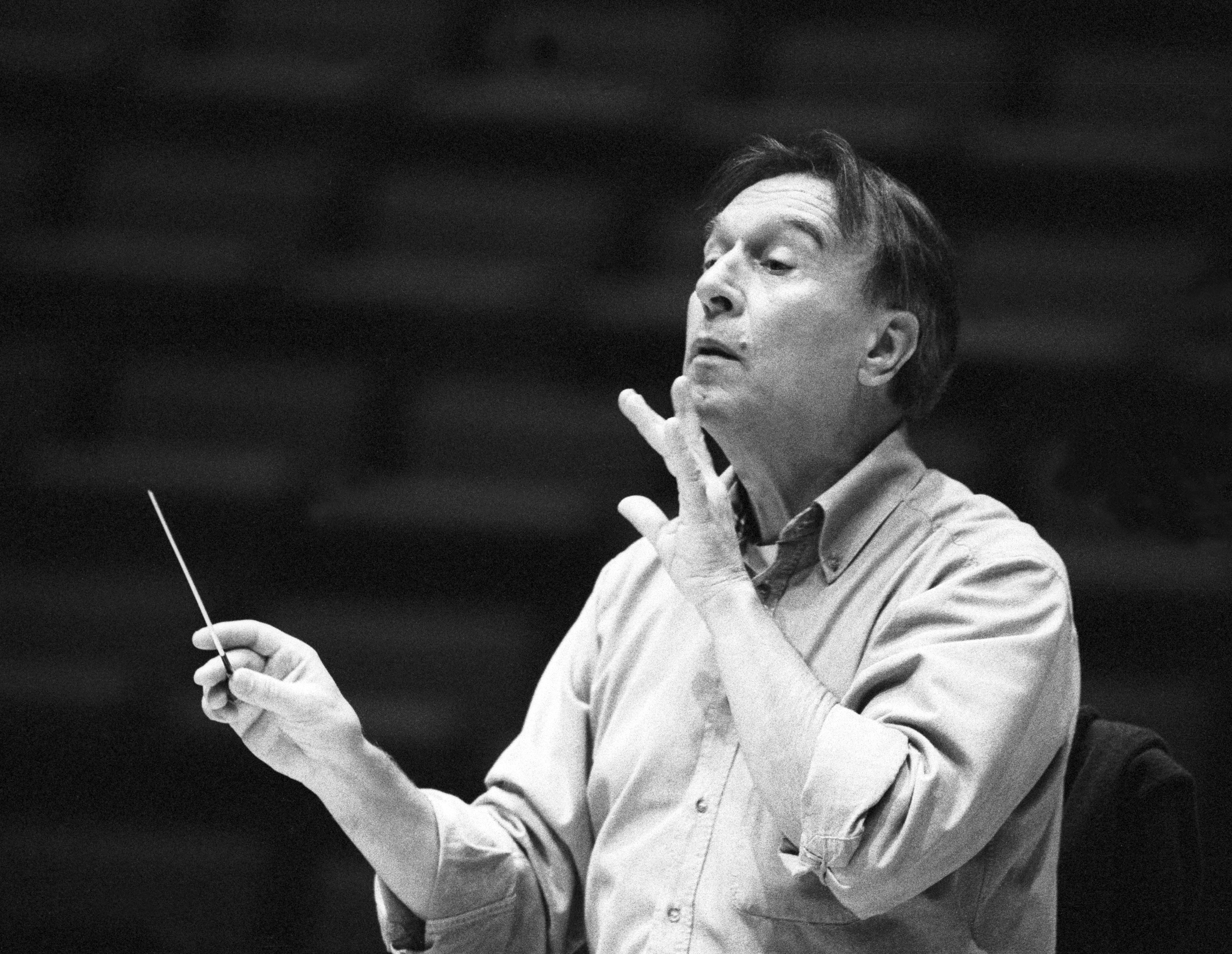
Abbado at a rehearsal of the Berlin Philharmonic, 1994

Abbado first conducted the Berlin Philharmonic in December 1966. In the late 1980s it was suspected that he might become music director of the New York Philharmonic. However, after appearances as a guest conductor, in 1989, the Berlin Philharmonic elected him as its chief conductor and artistic director, in succession to Herbert von Karajan. During his Berlin tenure, Abbado oversaw an increased presence of contemporary music in the orchestra's programming, in contrast to Karajan who had focused on late Romantic works. In 1992, he co-founded 'Berlin Encounters', a chamber music festival. In 1994, he became artistic director of the Salzburg Easter Festival. In 1998, he announced his departure from the Berlin Philharmonic after the expiration of his contract in 2002. Before his departure, he was diagnosed with stomach cancer in 2000, which led to his cancellation of a number of engagements with the orchestra. Subsequent medical treatment led to the removal of a portion of his digestive system, and he cancelled his conducting activities for 3 months in 2001.

In 2004, Abbado returned to conduct the Berlin Philharmonic for the first time since his departure as chief conductor, for concerts of Mahler's Symphony No. 6 recorded live for commercial release. The resulting CD won Best Orchestral Recording and Record of the Year in Gramophone magazine's 2006 awards. The Orchestra Academy of the Berlin Philharmonic established the Claudio Abbado Kompositionspreis (Claudio Abbado Composition Prize) in his honour, which has since been awarded in 2006, 2010 and 2014.

==== Other orchestras and post-Berlin work ====
In addition to his work with long-established ensembles, Abbado founded a number of new orchestras with younger musicians at their core. These included the European Community Youth Orchestra (later the European Union Youth Orchestra (EUYO)), in 1978, and the Gustav Mahler Jugendorchester (GMJO; Gustav Mahler Youth Orchestra) in (1988). In both instances, musicians from the respective youth orchestras founded spinoff orchestras, the Chamber Orchestra of Europe (COE) and the Mahler Chamber Orchestra, respectively. Abbado worked with both these ensembles regularly as well and was artistic advisor to the COE, though he did not hold a formal title with the Mahler Chamber Orchestra. In turn, the Mahler Chamber Orchestra formed the core of the newest incarnation of the Lucerne Festival Orchestra, which Abbado and Michael Haefliger of the Lucerne Festival established in the early 2000s, and which featured musicians from various orchestras with which Abbado had long-standing artistic relationships. From 2004 until his death, Abbado was the musical and artistic director of the Orchestra Mozart, Bologna, Italy. In addition to his work with the EUYO and the GMJO, Abbado worked with the Orquesta Sinfónica Simón Bolívar of Venezuela.

=== Death ===
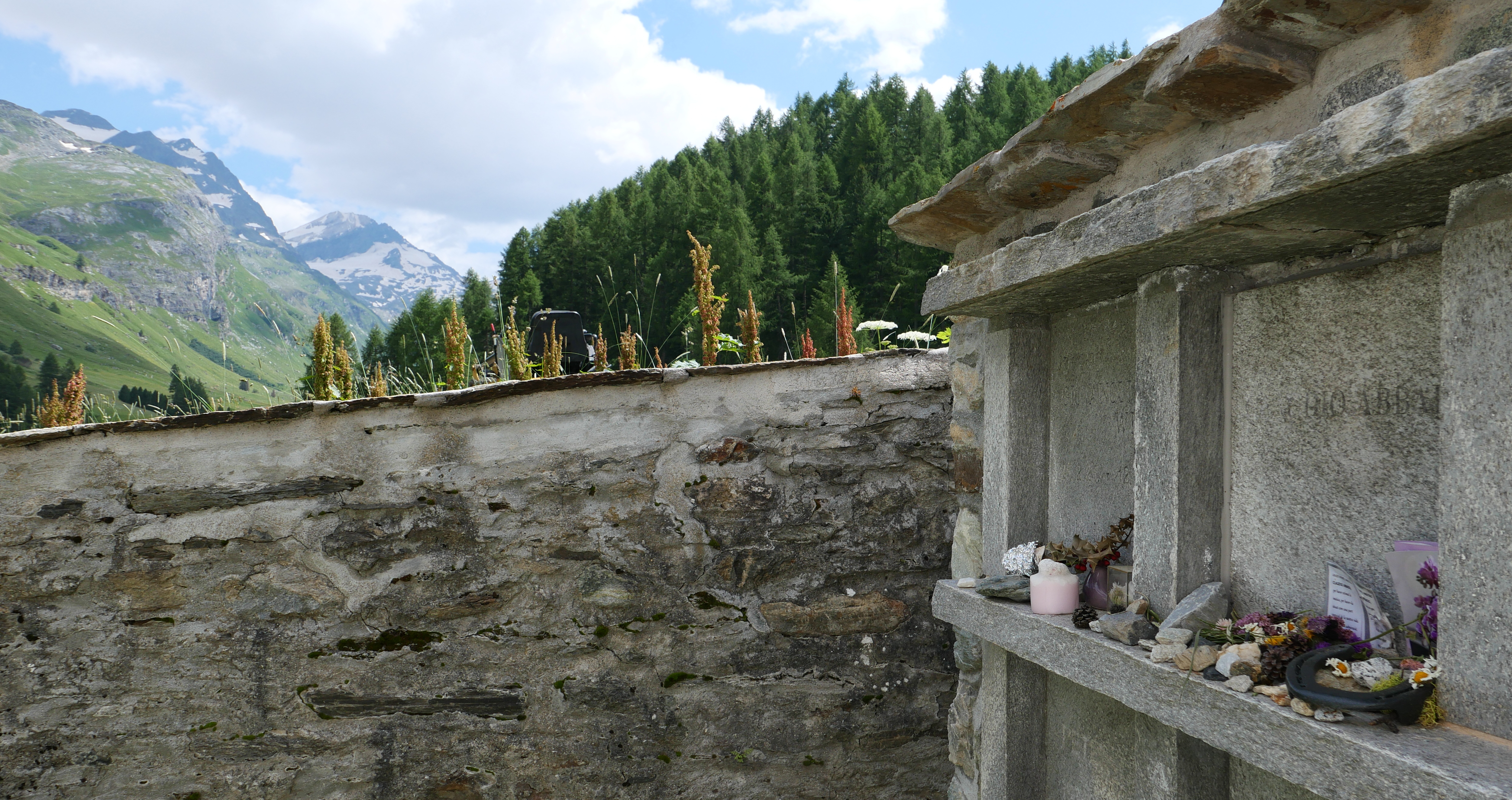
The grave in 2024 with the Fex-valley in the background.

Abbado died from stomach cancer in Bologna on 20 January 2014 at the age of 80. One week later, in tribute to him, the orchestra "Filarmonica della Scala", conducted by Daniel Barenboim, performed the slow movement of Beethoven's Symphony No. 3 (Marcia funebre: Adagio assai in C minor) to an empty theatre, with the performance relayed to a crowd in the square in front of the opera house and live-streamed via La Scala's website.

Abbado's mortal remains were cremated and an urn with a part of his ashes was buried at the cemetery of the 15th-century chapel of Fex-Crasta in the Val Fex. It is a part of the municipality of Sils-Maria, a village in the Swiss canton of Graubünden where Abbado had a vacation home.

His musical estate was transferred to the Berlin State Library where it is being catalogued and digitised.

== Personal life ==
From his first marriage in 1956 to singer Giovanna Cavazzoni, Abbado had two children: Daniele Abbado (born 1958), who became an opera director and Alessandra (born 1959). His first marriage was dissolved. From his second marriage, to Gabriella Cantalupi, Abbado had a son, Sebastiano. His four-year relationship with Viktoria Mullova resulted in Mullova's first child, a son, the jazz bassist, Misha Mullov-Abbado. Abbado's nephew, the son of his brother, Marcello, is the conductor Roberto Abbado.

== Conducting ==
=== Repertoire ===
Amongst a wide range of Romantic works which he recorded and performed, Abbado had a particular affinity with the music of Gustav Mahler, whose symphonies he recorded several times. Despite this, he never managed to complete a cycle with a single orchestra: in a mix of studio and concert releases, he recorded Symphonies 1–2 and 5–7 in Chicago, Symphonies 2–4, 9 and the Adagio from 10 in Vienna, Symphonies 1 and 3–9 in Berlin, and Symphonies 1–7 and 9 in Lucerne. A planned Eighth in Lucerne (the intended culmination of his traversal of the symphonies there) had to be cancelled owing to his ill health. The symphony was finally performed and recorded in 2016 under Riccardo Chailly as a tribute to Abbado. A further Tenth Adagio recorded live in Berlin in 2011 was issued as part of a Berliner Philharmoniker Mahler set in 2020.

He was also noted for his interpretations of modern works by composers such as Arnold Schoenberg, Karlheinz Stockhausen, Giacomo Manzoni, Luigi Nono, Bruno Maderna, György Ligeti, Giovanni Sollima, Roberto Carnevale, Franco Donatoni and George Benjamin.

=== Musical style ===
Abbado tended to speak very little in rehearsal, sometimes using the simple request to orchestras to "Listen". This was a reflection of his preference for communication as a conductor via physical gesture and the eyes, and his perception that orchestras did not like conductors who spoke a great deal in rehearsal. Clive Gillinson characterised Abbado's style as follows:

"...he basically doesn't say anything in rehearsals, and speaks so quietly, because he's so shy, so people can get bored. But it works because everyone knows the performances are so great. I've never known anybody more compelling. He's the most natural conductor in the world. Some conductors need to verbally articulate what they want through words, but Claudio just shows it, just does it."

In performance, Abbado often conducted from memory, as he himself noted:

"...it is indispensable to know the score perfectly and be familiar with the life, the works and the entire era of the composer. I feel more secure without a score. Communication with the orchestra is easier."

== Recordings ==
Abbado recorded extensively for a variety of labels, including Decca, Deutsche Grammophon, Columbia (later Sony Classical), and EMI. He conducted many opera recordings which received various awards. Among these were the Diapason Award in 1966 and 1967; also in 1967 he received the Grand Prix du Disque. In 1968 he was presented with the Deutscher Schallplattenpreis and also the Dutch Edison Award. In 1973, the Vienna Mozart Society awarded him the Mozart Medal. Abbado received the 1997 Grammy Award in the Best Small Ensemble Performance (with or without conductor) category for "Hindemith: Kammermusik No. 1 With Finale 1921, Op. 24 No. 1" and the 2005 Grammy Award in the Best Instrumental Soloist(s) Performance (with Orchestra) category for "Beethoven: Piano Concertos Nos. 2 & 3" performed by Martha Argerich.

In 2012, Abbado was voted into the Gramophone Hall of Fame that April, and in May, he received the conductor prize at the Royal Philharmonic Society Music Awards.

=== Notable recordings ===
The following represents a selection of Abbado's most well-known recordings.

- Beethoven, Fidelio, live recording with the Lucerne Festival Orchestra, Mahler Chamber Orchestra and Arnold Schoenberg Choir, 2010 (Decca)
- Beethoven, Berg, Violin Concertos, recorded with Isabelle Faust and Orchestra Mozart, 2012 (Harmonia Mundi), winner of Gramophone Classical Music Award - Concerto
- Berg, Wozzeck, live performance with the Vienna Philharmonic and Vienna State Opera, 1987 (DG)
- Berg, Lulu Suite, Altenberg Lieder, 3 Orchestra pieces, recorded with Margaret Price and London Symphony Orchestra, 1997 (DG, The Originals-Legendary Recordings), winner of Gran Premio del Disco, Madrid
- Brahms, Hungarian Dances, studio recording with the Vienna Philharmonic, 1982 (DG)
- Brahms, Symphonies Nos. 1-4, studio recording with the Berlin Philharmonic, 1988 (DG)
- Bruckner, Symphony no. 9, live recording with the Lucerne Festival Orchestra, 2013 (DG), winner of Gramophone's Best Record of the Year (2015)
- Chopin, Liszt, Piano Concerto No. 1 and Piano Concerto No. 1, recorded with Martha Argerich and the London Symphony Orchestra, 1968 (DG, The Originals)
- Mahler, Symphony No. 6, live performance with the Berlin Philharmonic Orchestra, 2005 (DG), winner of Gramophone's Best Record of the Year (2006)
- Mendelssohn, Symphonies Nos 1-5 and Overtures, studio recordings with London Symphony Orchestra 1985 (DG)
- Mozart, The Magic Flute, live performance with the Mahler Chamber Orchestra and Arnold Schoenberg Choir, 2005 (DG)
- Mozart, Piano Concertos 20, 21, 25, 27 with Friedrich Gulda and the Vienna Philharmonic 1975, 1976 (DG)
- Mozart, Piano Concertos 20 & 25, live performance with Martha Argerich and the Orchestra Mozart at Lucerne Festival, 2014 (DG), [Abbado's final recording]
- Mozart, Violin Concertos Nos. 1–5 and Sinfonia Concertante, recorded with Giuliano Carmignola and the Orchestra Mozart, 2008 (Archiv Production, DG)
- Prokofiev, Alexander Nevsky, Lieutenant Kije, Scythian Suite, recorded with the London Symphony Orchestra and Chicago Symphony Orchestra, 1995 (DG, The Originals)
- Prokofiev, Piano Concerto No. 3 / Ravel: Piano Concerto in G, recorded with Martha Argerich and Berlin Philharmonic, 1967 (DG, The Originals) [Abbado's first DG Album], winner of Grand Prix du Disque, Deutsche Schallplatenpreis, Gran Premio del Disco, Madrid
- Rossini, Il barbiere di Siviglia, recorded with the London Symphony Orchestra and the Ambrosian Opera Chorus, 1972 (DG, The Originals)
- Rossini, La Cenerentola, recorded with the London Symphony Orchestra and Scottish Opera Chorus, 1971 (DG), [Abbado's first opera recording]
- Rossini, L'italiana in Algeri, recorded with the Vienna Philharmonic and Vienna State Opera, 1989 (DG)
- Rossini, Il Viaggio a Reims, live performance with the Chamber Orchestra of Europe and the Prague Philharmonic Chorus, 1985 (DG), winner of Gramophone Classical Music Award - Opera
- Rossini, Overtures, recorded with the Chamber Orchestra of Europe, 1991 (DG)
- Schubert, Symphonies No. 1-6, 8-9, studio recordings with the Chamber Orchestra of Europe, 1988 (DG), winner of Gramophone Classical Music Award - Instrumental
- Tchaikovsky, Piano Concerto No. 1, live performance with Martha Argerich and the Berlin Philharmonic, 1983 (DG)
- Verdi, Macbeth, live performance with Orchestra Del Teatro Alla Scala, 1985 (DG, The Originals), winner of Orphée d'or, Record Academy Prize Tokyo, Grand Prix Du Disque, Prix Mondial du disque de Montreux, "Premi della Criticia Discografica Italiana"
- Verdi, Simon Boccanegra, studio recording with Teatro alla Scala, 1977 (DG, The Originals), winner of Grand Prix du Disque, International Record Critics Award, Edison Award, Prix Caecitia, Brussels, Gran Premio del Disco, Madrid

== Honours and awards ==
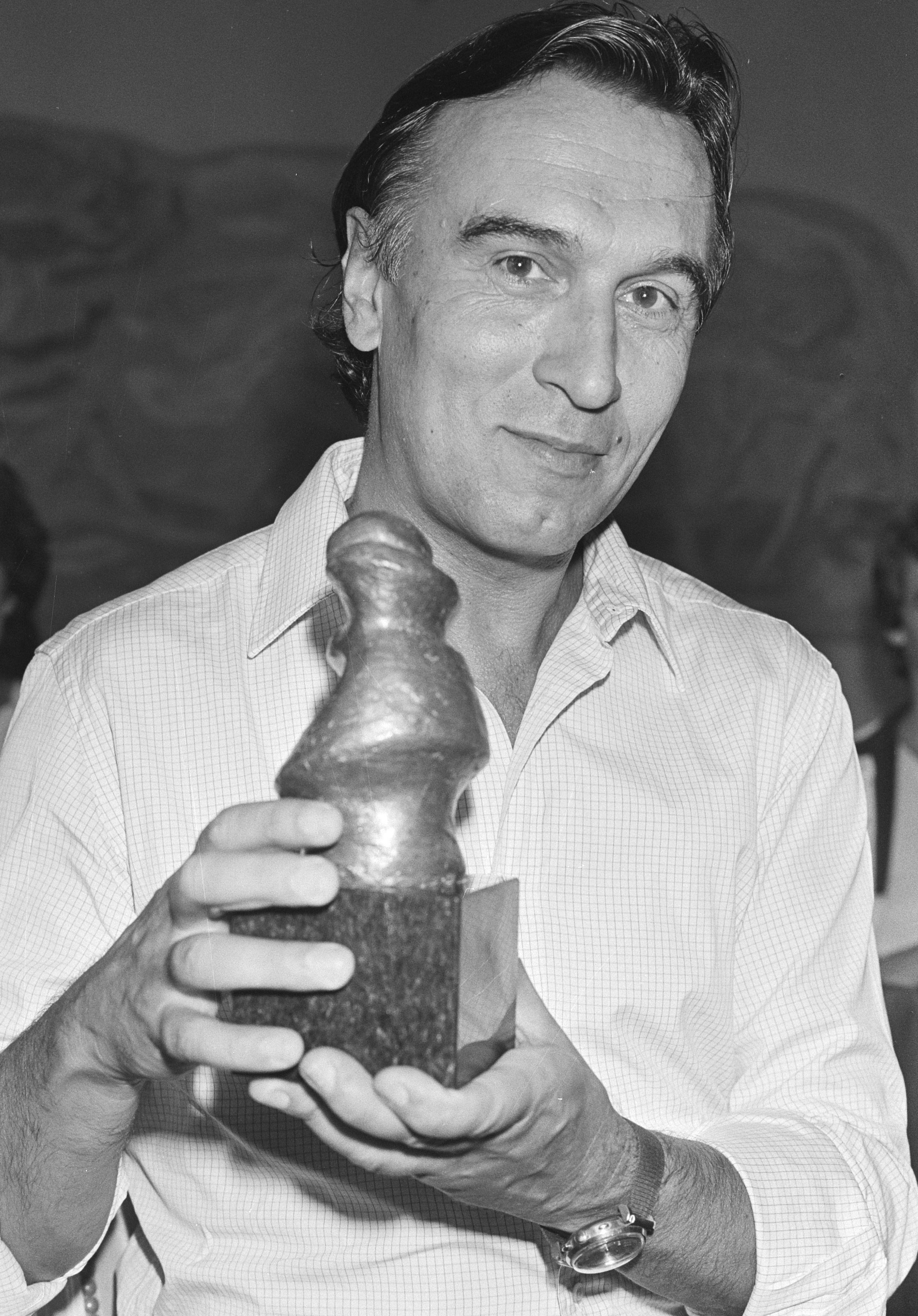
Claudio Abbado in 1982

- Koussevitzky Prize, 1958
- Dimitri Mitropoulos Memorial International Competition, 1963 (Won the one-year position as assistant conductor to Leonard Bernstein at the New York Philharmonic.)
- Knight Grand Cross of the Order of Merit of the Italian Republic, 12 July 1984
- Mahler Medal, 1985
- Grand cross of the Légion d'honneur, 1986
- City of Vienna, Ehrenring [Honor ring], 1994
- Ernst von Siemens Music Prize, 1994
- Medal for Meritorious for Culture and Art, 13 January 1997
- Knight Commander's Cross of the Order of Merit of the Federal Republic of Germany, 2002
- Praemium Imperiale, 2003
- Royal Philharmonic Society Gold Medal, 2003
- Wolff Prize in Arts, 2008

Abbado received honorary doctorates from the universities of Ferrara (1990), Cambridge (1994), Aberdeen (1986) and Havana.

On 30 August 2013, President Giorgio Napolitano, appointed Abbado to the Italian Senate as a Senator for life, in honour of his "outstanding cultural achievements". Abbado became a member of the Public Education and Cultural Heritage Commission of the Italian Senate on 25 September 2013.

== Videography ==
- New Year's Eve Concert 1992: Richard Strauss Gala with Martha Argerich, Kathleen Battle, Renée Fleming, Andreas Schmidt, Frederica von Stade and the Berlin Philharmonic Orchestra, Kultur Video DVD, D4209, 2007
- Hearing the Silence (Documentary), Berliner Philharmoniker, Lucerne Festival Orchestra.
- "Beethoven, Symphonies 3 & 9, Berliner Philharmoniker." Euroarts, 2 DVD set. Symphony No. 3 performed by the Accademia Nazionale di Santa Cecelia, Rome, February 2001. Symphony No. 9 performed by the Berliner Philharmoniker, May 2000 / August 2002, in Munich. The DVD of Symphony NO. 3 offers "Conductor Camera" sequences, in which the orchestra's view of the conductor may be selected. Symphony 9 performers include Karita Mattila, soprano; Violetta Urmana, mezzo-soprano; Thomas Moser, tenor; Eike Wilm Schulte, baritone; the Swedish Radio Choir and the Eric Ericson Chamber Choir; chorus master, Tönu Kaljuste.

== Sources ==
- Europa Publications, ed. (1996). "Abbado, Claudio". The International Who's Who: 1996–97 (60th ed.). London, UK: Europa Publications Limited. ISBN 1-85743-021-2.
- Ewen, David, ed. (1978). "Claudio Abbado". Musicians Since 1900: Performers in Concert and Opera. New York, NY: The H. W. Wilson Company. pp. 1–3. ISBN 0-8242-0565-0. LCCN 78012727.
- Hoiberg, Dale H., ed. (2010). "Abbadio, Claudio". Encyclopædia Britannica. Vol. I: A-Ak – Bayes (15th ed.). Chicago, Illinois: Encyclopædia Britannica, Inc. ISBN 978-1-59339-837-8.
- Moritz, Charles; Lohr, Evelyn; Sloan, Henry; Dugan, Kieran, eds. (1974). "Abbado, Claudio". Current Biography Yearbook 1973. New York, NY: The H. W. Wilson Company. pp. 1–3. ISBN 0-8242-0543-X. LCCN 40027432.
- Randel, Don Michael (1996). "Claudio Abbado". The Harvard biographical dictionary of music. Cambridge, MA: Belknap Press of Harvard University Press. ISBN 0-674-37299-9.
- Ross, Alex (22 October 2001). "Beethoven Unbound". The New Yorker. Vol. 77, no. 32. pp. 83–85. ISSN 0028-792X. Archived from the original on 9 October 2014.

Cultural offices
Preceded by Guido Cantelli	Music Director, La Scala, Milan; 1968–1986	Succeeded by Riccardo Muti
Preceded by Egon Seefehlner	General Music Director, Vienna State Opera; 1986–1991	Succeeded by Eberhard Wachter
Preceded by (no predecessor)	Artistic & Musical Director, Orchestra Mozart; 2004–2014	Succeeded by Daniele Gatti
