= Lucerne Festival =

Swiss classical music festival

Coordinates: 47°02′56″N 8°18′23″E

- Genre: Classical music
- Locations: Lucerne, Switzerland
- Years active: 1938–present
- Website: lucernefestival.ch

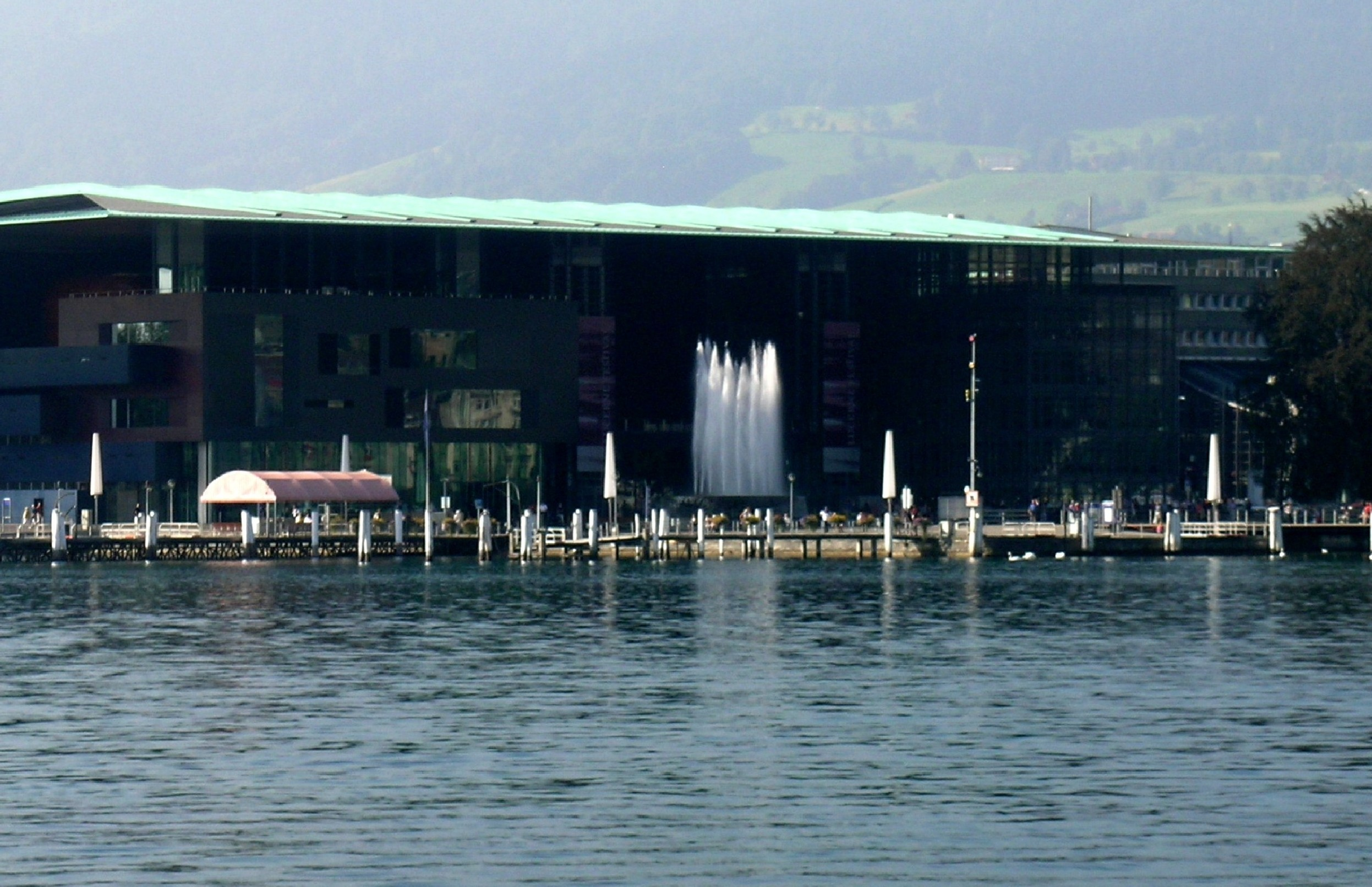
Lucerne Festival

Lucerne Festival is one of the leading international festivals in the world of classical music and presents a series of classical music festivals based in Lucerne, Switzerland. Founded in 1938 by Ernest Ansermet and Walter Schulthess, it currently produces three festivals per year. From 1999 to 2025, Michael Haefliger was its executive and artistic director. Since January 2026, Sebastian Nordmann has been director of Lucerne Festival.

Each festival features resident orchestras and soloists alongside guest performances from international ensembles and artists. The central festival takes place in summer from mid-August to mid-September and offers a widely varied range of approximately 100 concerts and related events primarily at the Lucerne Culture and Congress Centre (KKL) designed by Jean Nouvel.

== History ==
The festival started with the so-called "Concert de Gala" in the gardens of Richard Wagner's villa at Tribschen in 1938 conducted by Arturo Toscanini, who had formed an orchestra with members of different orchestras and soloists from around Europe. In the 1940s the Swiss Festival Orchestra (Schweizerische Festspielorchester) was founded from members of the elite Swiss orchestras, which became a central part of the festival known since 1943 as the Internationalen Musikfestwochen Luzern (IMF).

In 2000 the Internationale Musikfestwochen Luzern (IMF) was renamed as Lucerne Festival. Each festival features resident orchestras and soloists alongside guest performances from international ensembles and artists, in 2019 including the Berlin Philharmonic, Royal Concertgebouw Orchestra, Vienna Philharmonic, Bernard Haitink, Anne-Sophie Mutter and Simon Rattle. Since the 1970s the annual festivals are organized around different themes.

== Organization ==
Since 1970 Lucerne Festival has been legally organized as a foundation. Since 1999 the executive and artistic director of Lucerne Festival has been Michael Haefliger, whose contract has been extended to 2025.

By founding the Lucerne Festival Orchestra, which was introduced to the public for the first time in August 2003, the conductor Claudio Abbado and Michael Haefliger re-established a link to the origins of Lucerne Festival in 1938. It was then, with a legendary "Concert de Gala," that Arturo Toscanini gathered prominent virtuosos of the era together to form an elite orchestra. The Lucerne Festival Orchestra comprises internationally recognised principals, chamber musicians, and music teachers. With Riccardo Chailly, this orchestra once again has an Italian music director. Chailly, who became Abbado's successor in the summer of 2016, extended his contract until the end of 2026.

The Lucerne Festival Academy was founded in 2003 by Pierre Boulez and Michael Haefliger. Each summer, academy members are joined by leading internationally renowned composers and conductors to work on contemporary scores and modern classics and to perform music of the twentieth and twenty-first centuries. The composer Wolfgang Rihm has been the artistic director of the academy since 2016 and his contract has been extended until 2025. In 2021 the Lucerne Festival Contemporary Orchestra (LFCO) as a new festival orchestra devoted to contemporary music was founded to bring together current and former Academy students.

Sebastian Nordmann took over as Executive and Artistic Director for the organization in 2026.

== Festivals ==
Lucerne Festival organized three festivals every year until 2019. Due to the Coronavirus pandemic in 2020 all three festivals had to be cancelled; inaugural Spring Musical Weekend (with Teodor Currentzis), the Summer Festival and the weekend in fall (with Igor Levit and Patricia Kopatchinskaja). Instead, in August 2020 Lucerne Festival presented a comeback to life-music with the ten-day "Life is Live" festival, during which the Lucerne Festival Orchestra was led by Herbert Blomstedt for the first time.

In May 2021 the Festival communicated a new strategy and presented three new festival formats in spring and autumn. The central Summer Festival will in future be complemented in the fall by Lucerne Festival Forward which will take place in November 2021 for the first time, a new short festival with the Lucerne Festival Orchestra starting in spring 2022 and a Piano Festival with pianist Igor Levit was announced for May 2023.

=== Summer Festival ===
The largest festival is the Summer Festival taking place in August and September and featuring over 100 events. The core of the festival are around 30 symphony concerts featuring the world's best orchestras, conductors and soloists. Since 2003 it has been launched by the Lucerne Festival Orchestra. International stars are invited to be "artistes étoiles" and "composers-in-residence".

The Summer Festival is organized around an annual theme; recent topics have been "Identity", "Childhood" and "Power". The theme of the 2021 Summer Festival is "crazy".

The 2025 Summer Festival, themed Open End, will be the last under the direction of director Michael Haefliger. The event will also mark the first appearance of the Ark Nova, an inflatable mobile concert hall, in Europe.

=== Fall Festival ===
The inaugural Lucerne Festival Forward took place from 19 to 21 November 2021. The festival's artistic program was shaped by the members of the Lucerne Festival Contemporary Orchestra (LFCO). Through its digital communication channels, the festivals also invited the public to participate in the planning process.

The newly established orchestra, dedicated to contemporary music, consists of musicians from the international Lucerne Festival Academy network. Although the KKL Luzerne served as the festival's headquarters, Lucerne Festivals Forward events took place at venues throughout the city. The program welcomed audiences of all ages and featured unconventional concert formats, along with the use of new technologies.

=== Spring Festival ===
Starting in 2022, the Lucerne Festival Orchestra will open the Festival year annually on the weekend before Easter, under the direction of its music director, Riccardo Chailly. A Mendelssohn Festival is planned for the first two years, coupling all of the composer's symphonies with music by his contemporaries, such as Wagner, Schubert, and Berlioz, as well as his role model Johann Sebastian Bach.

=== Piano Fest ===
Following the huge success of his Beethoven cycle at Lucerne Festival, pianist Igor Levit curated the Piano Fest every May from 2023 to 2025. He performed himself, invited pianist friends and ensembles, and built bridges to other genres such as jazz and rap. Starting in May 2026, the new Lucerne Festival Pulse will take place for the first time, curated by the Icelandic pianist Víkingur Ólafsson.

=== Easter Festival ===
The Easter Festival (Lucerne Festival zu Ostern) was founded in 1988 and took place each spring over a nine-day period two weeks before Easter and lasting until Palm Sunday, with a special focus given to sacred music. Performances were held in churches throughout Lucerne, as well as in the KKL and included annual guest performances by the Bavarian Radio Symphony Orchestra and Choir. Additionally, Bernard Haitink together with the Lucerne Festival Strings led annual master classes for young conductors. The Easter Festival was ended after the 2019 edition.

=== Piano Festival ===
The Piano Festival was founded in 1998 and took place every November over a nine-day period. It showcased keyboard virtuosos and emerging stars in a mixture of recitals, orchestral concerts, and chamber music. The ancillary "Piano Off-Stage!" program presented a series of jazz events in a range of Lucerne's bars and restaurants. The Piano Festival was ended after the 2019 edition.

== Roche Commissions ==
1. 2004 Sir Harrison Birtwistle, Night’s Black Bird
2. 2005 Chen Yi, Si Ji (Four Seasons)
3. 2006 Hanspeter Kyburz, touché
4. 2008 George Benjamin, Duet
5. 2010 Toshio Hosokawa, Woven Dreams
6. 2012 Matthias Pintscher, Chute d’Étoiles. Hommage à Anselm Kiefer
7. 2014 Unsuk Chin, Le Silence des Sirènes
8. 2016 Olga Neuwirth, Trurliade – Zone Zero
9. 2018 Peter Eötvös, Reading Malevich
10. 2021 Rebecca Saunders, to an utterance
11. 2022 Thomas Adès, Air
12. 2024 Beat Furrer, Lichtung
13. 2026 Liza Lim, Tongue of the Land
14. 2028 Jörg Widmann
