= Lutheran hymn =

Christian hymn used in Lutheran services

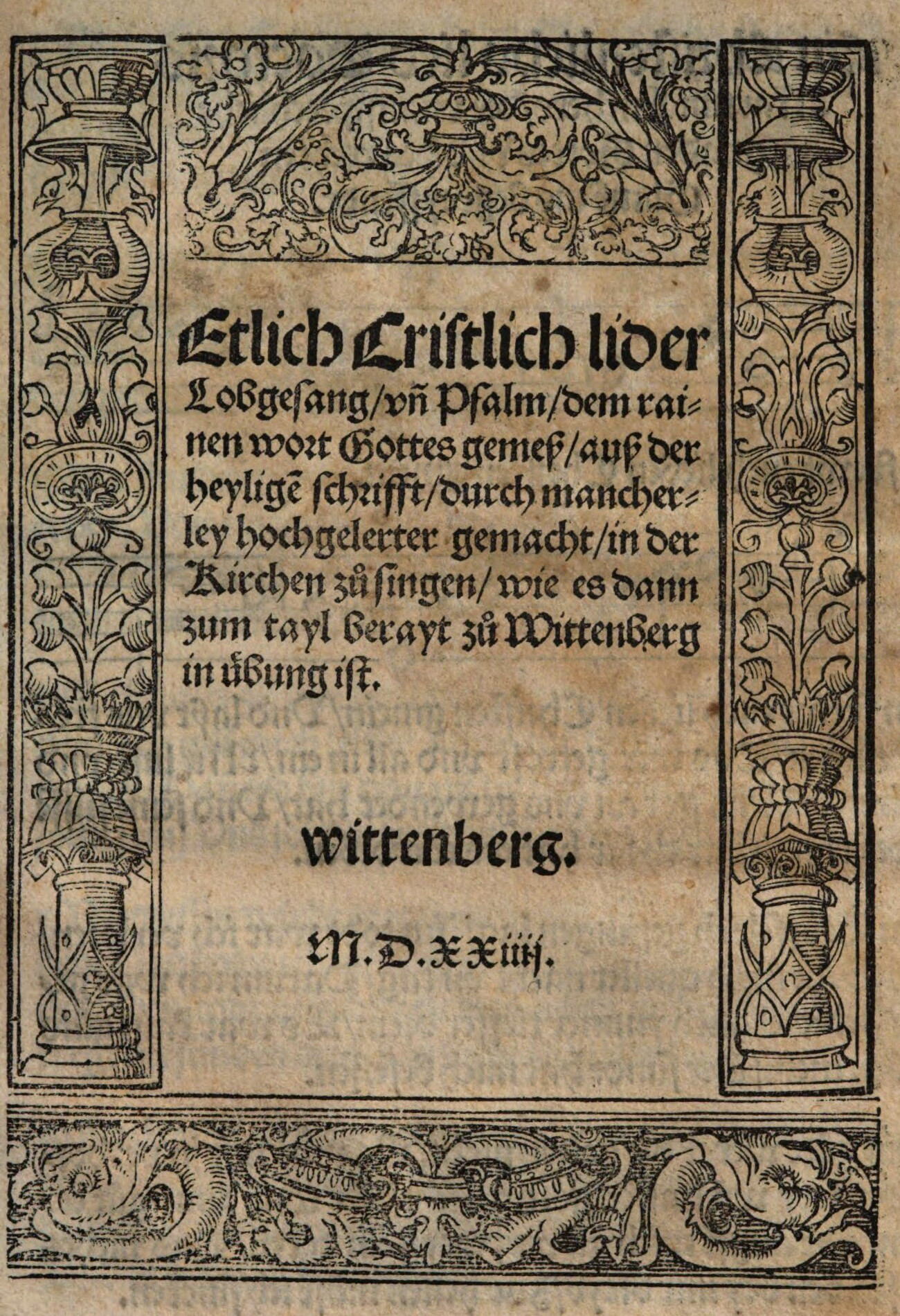
Front page of the Achtliederbuch (1524), known as the first Lutheran hymnal

Martin Luther was a great enthusiast for music, and this is why it forms a large part of Lutheran services; in particular, Luther admired the composers Josquin des Prez and Ludwig Senfl and wanted singing in the church to move away from the ars perfecta (Catholic Sacred Music of the late Renaissance) and towards singing as a Gemeinschaft (community). Lutheran hymns are sometimes known as chorales. Lutheran hymnody is well known for its doctrinal, didactic, and musical richness. Most Lutheran churches are active musically with choirs, handbell choirs, children's choirs, and occasionally change ringing groups that ring bells in a bell tower. Johann Sebastian Bach, a devout Lutheran, composed music for the Lutheran church: more than half of his over 1000 compositions are or contain Lutheran hymns.

== History ==
Lutheran hymnals include:

- Achtliederbuch, a.k.a. the first Lutheran hymnal (1524). Contains, among others, "Nun freut euch, lieben Christen g'mein", "Es ist das Heil uns kommen her", "Ach Gott, vom Himmel sieh darein", "Es spricht der Unweisen Mund wohl" and "Aus tiefer Not schrei ich zu dir".
- Erfurt Enchiridion (1524)
- Eyn geystlich Gesangk Buchleyn (1524)
- Becker Psalter (1602)
- Praxis pietatis melica (1640/47)
- Neu Leipziger Gesangbuch (1682)

== Characteristics ==
When Johannes Zahn catalogued the tunes of over 8800 Evangelical hymns in the late 19th century, he used the verse characteristics of the lyrics as basis of his classification system.

== Hymnodists ==
Lutheran hymnodists or hymn-writers:

- Martin Behm
- Elisabeth Cruciger
- Simon Dach
- Wolfgang Dachstein
- Paul Eber
- Paul Fleming
- Johann Franck
- Michael Franck
- Paul Gerhardt
- Johannes Gigas
- N. F. S. Grundtvig
- Claus Harms
- Johann Heermann
- Ludwig Helmbold
- Valerius Herberger
- Konrad Hubert
- Justus Jonas
- Christian Keymann
- Balthasar Kindermann
- Johann Kolross
- Martin Luther
- Hemminki of Masku
- Johann Matthäus Meyfart
- Georg Neumark
- Hallgrímur Pétursson
- Christian Heinrich Postel
- Adam Reusner
- Bartholomäus Ringwaldt
- Martin Rinkart
- Johann Rist
- Gottfried Wilhelm Sacer
- Carl Schalk
- Martin Schalling the Younger
- Lazarus Spengler
- Paul Speratus
- Paul Stockmann
- Melchior Teschner
- N. Samuel of Tranquebar
- Jaroslav Vajda
- Michael Weiße
- Catherine Winkworth

== Hymnologists ==
Hymnologists who published on Lutheran hymns:

- Nancy Raabe
- Philipp Wackernagel
- Johannes Zahn

== See also ==
- List of hymns by Martin Luther
