= Thomissøn's hymnal =

Hymnal published in Denmark

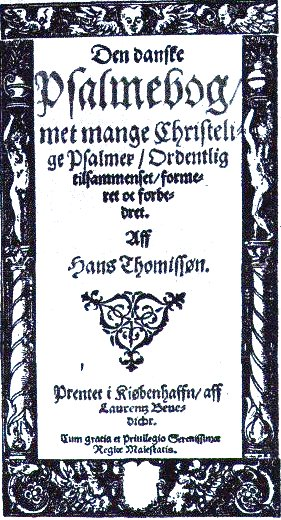
Thomissøn's hymnal from 1569

Thomissøn's hymnal (titled Den danske Psalmebog 'The Danish Hymnal') was a hymnal published in Denmark that received royal authorization in 1569.

The hymnal's original full title was Den danske Psalmebog, met mange Christelige Psalmer, Ordentlig tilsammenset, formeret oc forbedret. Aff Hans Thomissøn (The Danish Hymnal, with Many Christian Hymns, Carefully Gathered, Expanded, and Improved. By Hans Thomissøn). The book was published by Lorenz Benedict in Copenhagen in 1569.

Thomissøn's hymnal was the only hymnal allowed in Denmark–Norway after it received royal authorization. After this, churches were required to have it lying on their altars.

Hans Thomissøn was the country's leading hymnologist and he translated many of the hymns from German into Danish. He began his work on the hymnal, which took him twelve years, before he became the parish priest at the Church of Our Lady in Copenhagen in 1561. The work was the most important Reformation-era hymnal.

Melodies to accompany Thomissøn's hymnal were printed in 1573 in Niels Jespersen's gradual.

The hymnal contains 269 hymns, many of which are still known today, such as:

- "Alene Gud i himmerik" (God Alone in Heaven)
- "Krist stod opp av døde" (Christ Rose from the Dead)
- "Vår Gud han er så fast en borg" (A Mighty Fortress Is Our God)
- "Et lite barn så lystelig" (A Tiny Child So Full of Joy)
- "La det klinge sødt i sky" (Let the Clouds Sweetly Resound)
- "Julen har englelyd" (Christmas Sounds like Angels)
- "Lovet være du Jesus Krist" (Praise Be to You, Jesus Christ)
- "Nå ber vi Gud den Helligånd" (We Now Implore the Holy Ghost)
- "Av dypest' nød" (From Deepest Affliction)
- "Min sjel, nu lover Herren" (Now Praise, My Soul, the Lord)
- "O du Guds lam uskyldig" (Oh Lamb of God, Innocent)

== See also ==
- Metrical psalter

Lutheran

- First Lutheran hymnal
- Erfurt Enchiridion
- Eyn geystlich Gesangk Buchleyn
- Swenske songer eller wisor 1536

Anabaptist

- Ausbund

Anglican

- Book of Common Prayer
- Whole Book of Psalms

Presbyterian

- Book of Common Order
- Scottish Psalter

Reformed

- Souterliedekens
- Genevan Psalter
