= Ausbund =

Oldest Anabaptist hymnal

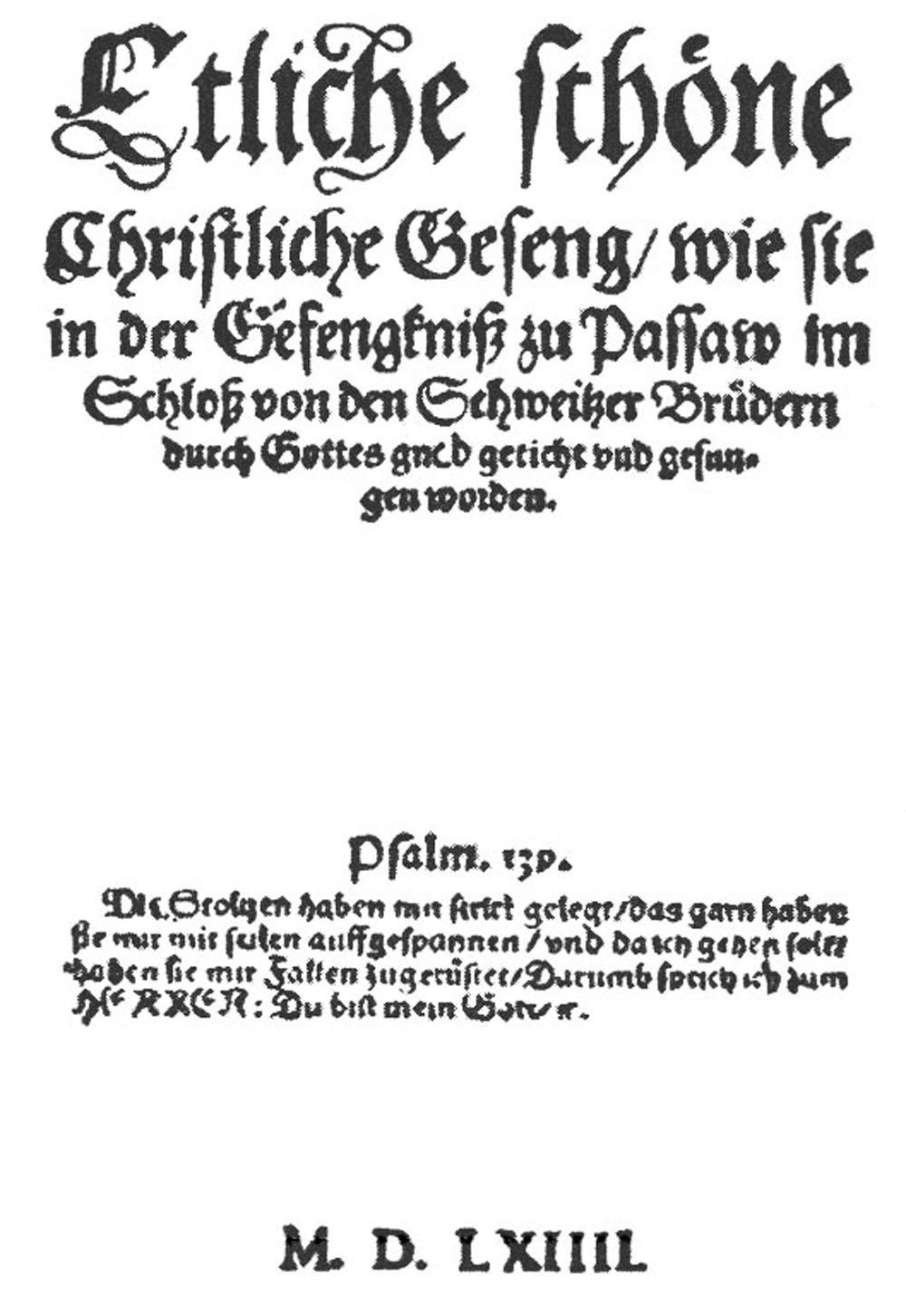
Ausbund title page

The Ausbund ("Paragon" in German) is the oldest Anabaptist hymnal and one of the oldest Christian song books in continuous use. It is used today by North American Amish congregations.

== History ==
The core of the Ausbund is based on fifty-three songs written by Anabaptists from Passau, Bavaria. Eleven of these songs were written by their leader, Michael Schneider. Twelve others may have been written by Hans Betz. The hymns were composed in the dungeon of Passau Castle, where the Anabaptists were imprisoned between 1535 and 1540 because of their convictions. Some - among them Hans Betz - did not survive the imprisonment. Many of these imprisoned Anabaptists were martyred.

The collection was printed in 1564. A copy of this first printing is found at the Mennonite Historical Library of Goshen College. It bears the title Etliche schöne christliche Gesäng wie dieselbigen zu Passau von den Schweizer Brüdern in der Gefenknus im Schloss durch göttliche Gnade gedicht und gesungen warden. Ps. 139 (Several Beautiful Christian Songs Which Were Written and Sung Through God's Grace by the Swiss Brethren in the Passau Castle Prison).

The printed hymnal must have been widely circulated. By the Frankenthaler Colloquiums (1571) it was already used as a source of criticism by opponents of Anabaptism.

Another edition of the hymnal with eighty more songs appeared in 1583. This is the first edition where the word Ausbund appears on the title page: Ausbund. Das ist etliche schöne christenliche Lieder, etc. Allen und jeden Christen, welcher Religion sie seien, unpartheyisch nützlich.

Later editions included 137 (Europe) and 140 (North America) songs. In all there are eleven known European editions of the Ausbund. In the 16th and 17th centuries, the hymnals were published in Cologne and the Rhineland. In the 18th and 19th centuries, new editions appeared in Basel und Strasbourg. The last European edition was printed in Basel in 1838. The first American Ausbund appeared in 1742 and was printed at Christopher Saur's Germantown press. Mennonite Bishop Henry Funck was the publisher of this hymnal, which was used until the end of the 18th century by the Swiss Mennonite churches. It was replaced by Die kleine geistliche Harfe and Unpartheyisches Gesangbuch of 1804, both from Pennsylvania.

The Ausbund is now exclusively used in Amish worship, preserving the unique spirit of the 17th-century Anabaptists. A number of the hymns have been translated into English both in book reference form and also set to music as found in the Christian Hymnary where it is used in many Conservative Mennonite worship services.

== Characteristics ==
The oldest songs from the Ausbund are mainly about the suffering church in a hostile environment. At the center stand those serious Christians who are prepared to die for their faith. They reflect not only grief and despair, but also the understanding of God's presence. There are always more reasons to thank God as one pours out their troubles. Among others, song number 131, O Gott, Vater, wir loben dich und deine Güte preisen wir (O God, Father, we praise you and your kindness we praise), today is sung at beginning of each Amish worship service.

== Content ==
The first song of the Ausbund is from the pen of Sebastian Franck. The song teaches that Christians should sing in spirit and truth, pray and praise God with Psalms. The second song is an adaptation of the Athanasian Creed.

Songs 6, 7 and 8 are written by Felix Manz, Michael Sattler and Hans Hut, all Anabaptist martyrs. Other martyr songs are by Leonhard Schiemer, Hans Schlaffer, George Blaurock and Hans Leupold, who were among the victims of the first great persecution of Anabaptists.

Hans Büchl, participant in the Frankenthaler Colloquiums, is the writer of five Ausbund songs. Eleven songs are of Dutch origin. The Dutch Anabaptists wrote another eleven songs. Five songs are from the Bohemian Brothers.

Many of Ausbund songs have a teaching character: Bible lessons, the Anabaptist views on believers baptism, the Lord's Supper and a focus on eschatology. Songs in this last topic include Büchl's (Nr. 46): Ain new christelich Lied von der gegenwardig schröcklichen letzten Dagen, in welchen so vil verschieden secten, auffrührerisch und falsche Propheten erschainen, auch blutdirstige tyrannen (A new Christian song from the current terrible last days, in which many different sects, rebellious and false prophets and bloodthirsty tyrants appear).

Until 1809 the European Ausbund was distributed with no indication of location or publisher. From 1692 the government of Bern forbade the distribution or possession of this hymnal and ordered its confiscation under threat of severe punishment.

The American edition contains the confession of faith of Thomas von Imbroich (1558) entitled Wahrhaftigen Bericht über die große Trübsal, die die Geschwister rund um Zürich für ihre Glaubenssache zwischen 1635 und 1645 zu erleiden hatten (a collection of martyr stories).

From a literary viewpoint, the content of the Ausbund is of limited quality, yet witnesses of a deep religious belief and sacrificial devotion of the believers.

== Music ==
The Ausbund contains no musical notes. Most of the songs were sung to popular melodies. According to the research of George Pullen Jackson, some melodies came from folk and love songs and others from chorales and hymns. The oldest melodies are from the 13th and 14th centuries. As with most Christian hymnbooks, the Amish normally use the Ausbund only in church. Their traditional melodies are called "slow tunes", but they put other melodies on the words during singing. Author Joseph Yoder compared the slow tempo of the music as it is sung today to Gregorian Chant, but this was not always the case. The Amish slow tunes of the 20th century are probably descended from tunes that the original Anabaptists knew. But over time, and with neither written notation nor musical instruments to keep the beat, the tunes have slowed down and ornamentation has been added in.

== Samples ==
- Aus tiefer Not schrei ich zu dir

Leonhard Schiemer: Dein heilig statt

Dein heilig statt hond sie zerstört, / dein Altar umbgegraben, / darzu auch deine Knecht ermördt, / wo sie's ergriffen haben. / Nur wir allein / dein heuflein klein, / sind wenig uberbliben, / mit schmach und schand / durch alle land / verjaget und vertriben.

Wir sind zerstrewt gleich wie die schaf, / die keinen Hirten haben, / verlassen unser hauß und hooff / und sind gleich dem Nachtraben, / der sich auch offt / hewlt in steinklufft. / In Felsen und in klufften / ist unser gmach, / man stellt uns nach, / wie Vöglein in der lufften.

Wir schleichen in den Wälden umb, / man sucht uns mit den Hunden, / man führt uns als die Lemlein stum / gefangen und gebunden. / Man zeigt uns an vor jedermann, / als weren wir Auffrürer, / wir sind geacht / wie Schaf zur schlacht / als Ketzer und verführer.

Vil sind auch in den Banden eng / an ihrem leib verdorben, / ettliche durch die marter streng / umbkommen und gestorben / on alle schuld; / hie ist gedult / der Heiligen auff erden. / (..........?)

Man hat sie an die bäum gehenkt, / erwürget und zerhawen, / heimlich und öffentlich ertrenckt / vil Weiber und jungfrawen. / Die haben frey / ohn alle schew / der warheit zeugnuß geben, / dasz Jesus Christ / die wahrheit ist, / der weg und auch das leben.

Noch tobt die Welt und ruhet nicht, / ist gar unsinnig worden, / vil lügen sie auff uns erdicht, / mit brennen und mit morden / thut sie uns bang. / O Herr, wie lang / willtu dazzu doch schweigen? / Richt den hochmut, / der heiligen bluth / laß wer dein Thron auffsteigen!

== See also ==
Topics

- Martyrs Mirror
- Joseph Yoder
- Metrical psalter

Anglican hymnals

- Book of Common Prayer
- Whole Book of Psalms

Lutheran hymnals

- First Lutheran hymnal
- Erfurt Enchiridion
- Eyn geystlich Gesangk Buchleyn
- Swenske songer eller wisor 1536
- Thomissøn's hymnal

Presbyterian hymnals

- Book of Common Order
- Scottish Psalter

Reformed hymnals

- Souterliedekens
- Genevan Psalter
