= Swenske songer eller wisor 1536 =

1536 hymnal by Olaus Petri

Swenske songer eller wisor
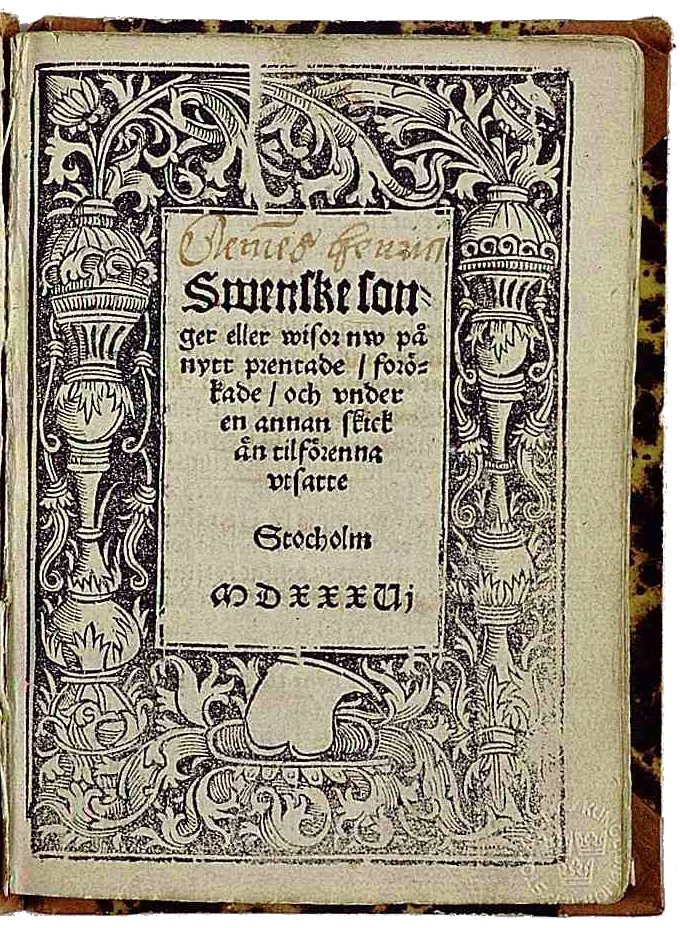
- Title leaf of the 1539 version of Swenske songer eller wisor
- Language: Swedish
- Published: 1536
- Publication place: Sweden

Swenske songer eller wisor nw på nytt prentade / forökade / och under en annan skick än tilförenna utsatte, often abbreviated as just Swenske songer eller wisor 1536, is the first preserved hymnal published in the Swedish language and was released in 1536. It consists of 47 songs or hymns, all of which have been issued anonymously. Olaus Petri, a major contributor to the Protestant Reformation in Sweden, is however believed to have authored most of them, with contributions from Ericus Olai and Laurentius Petri. A large amount are translations of Latin and German hymns.

The hymnal is presumably the fourth edition of the Swenske songer eller wisor series. The first edition is believed to have been released in 1526, but no preserved copy of it exists. Only a fragment of the second edition has been preserved, and no copy of the third edition has survived. The creation of Swenske songer eller wisor was ordered by the then King of Sweden, Gustav Vasa. During his reign, Protestantism was introduced in the country and he wanted to give the Swedish people a hymnal in their own language that they could understand—much like Martin Luther did when he translated the Bible. Prior to the Protestant Reformation, most hymns were sung in Latin.

In the sixteenth century, the majority of the Swedish population was unable to read and write and therefore had to memorize the hymns. This could be one of the reasons that only a few copies of Swenske songer eller wisor 1536 were made. Another reason is that printing techniques at the time were not sufficiently developed to produce an affordable hymnal for widespread distribution. Only two copies of Swenske songer eller wisor 1536 are available today, one of which was printed later than the other with several adjustments. These two copies are both located at the National Library of Sweden.

The hymns featured in Swenske songer eller wisor 1536 and the other editions of the series were reprinted several times until Uppsalapsalmboken (English: The Uppsala Hymnal) was published in 1645. Uppsalapsalmboken was recognized by the Swedish government as the country's first official hymnal.

== See also ==
- Metrical psalter

Lutheran

- First Lutheran hymnal
- Erfurt Enchiridion
- Eyn geystlich Gesangk Buchleyn
- Thomissøn's hymnal

Anabaptist

- Ausbund

Anglican

- Book of Common Prayer
- Whole Book of Psalms

Presbyterian

- Book of Common Order
- Scottish Psalter

Reformed

- Souterliedekens
- Genevan Psalter
