= Es ist das Heil uns kommen her, BWV 9 =

Church cantata by Johann Sebastian Bach

Es ist das Heil uns kommen her
- BWV 9
- Chorale cantata by J. S. Bach
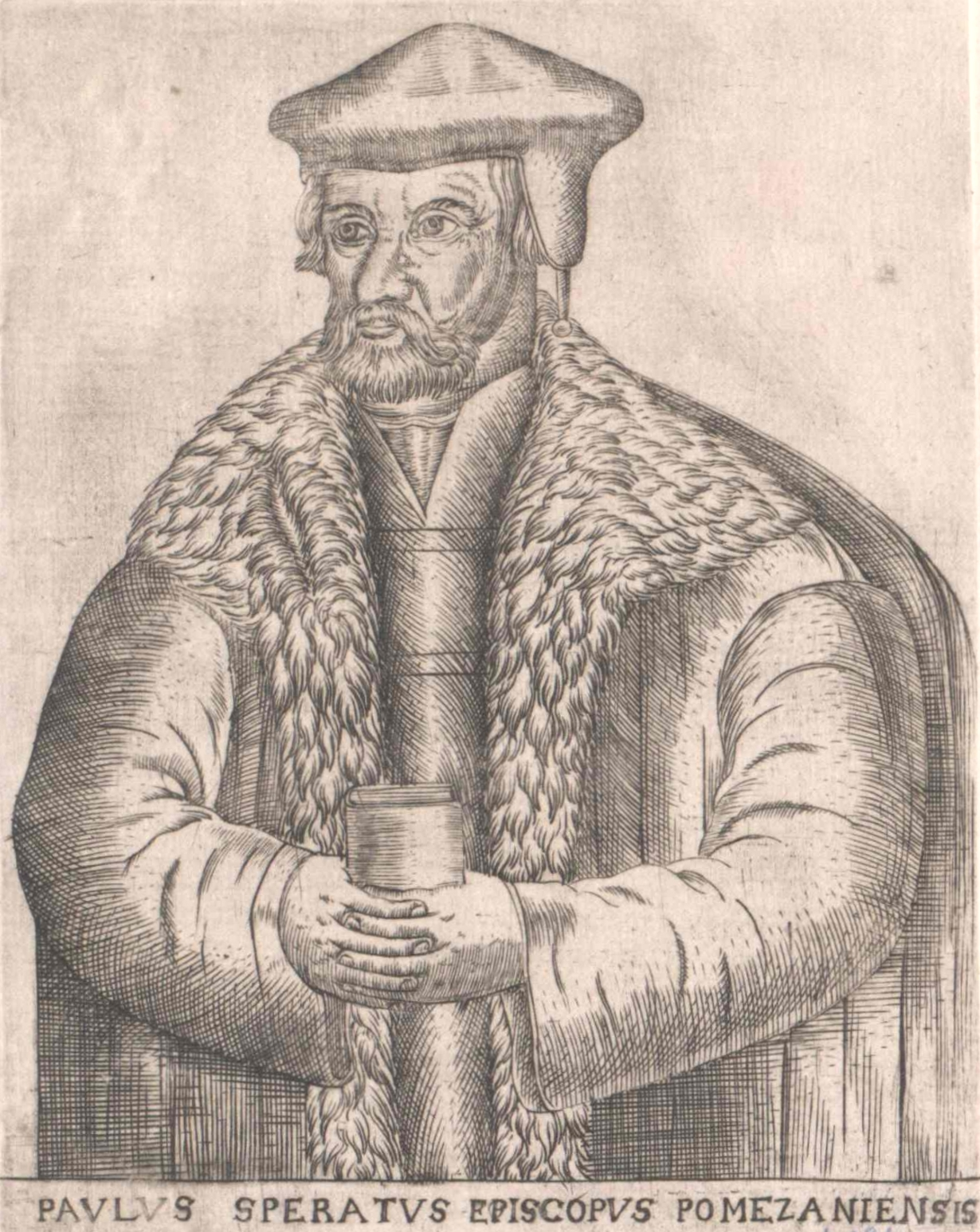
- Paul Speratus, author of the chorale
- Occasion: Sixth Sunday after Trinity
- Chorale: "Es ist das Heil uns kommen her" by Paul Speratus
- Performed: 1 August 1734: Leipzig
- Movements: 7
- Vocal: SATB choir and solo
- Instrumental: flauto traverso; oboe d'amore; 2 violins; viola; continuo

Johann Sebastian Bach composed the church cantata Es ist das Heil uns kommen her (It is our salvation come here to us), BWV 9 in Leipzig for the sixth Sunday after Trinity and first performed it on 1 August 1734. It is a chorale cantata, based on the hymn "Es ist das Heil uns kommen her" by Paul Speratus. Bach composed the cantata to fill a gap in his chorale cantata cycle written for performances in Leipzig from 1724.

The cantata is structured in seven movements, framed as the earlier chorale cantatas by a chorale fantasia and a chorale four-part setting, of the first and the twelfth stanza in the original words by the reformer Speratus, published in the First Lutheran hymnal. The theme is salvation from sin by God's grace alone. An anonymous librettist paraphrased the content of ten inner stanzas to alternating recitatives and arias. Bach scored the cantata for a chamber ensemble of four vocal parts, flauto traverso, oboe d'amore, strings and continuo. He gave all three recitatives to the bass, like a sermon interrupted in reflection by a tenor aria with solo violin and a duet of soprano and alto with the wind instruments.

== History and words ==
Bach composed the cantata for the Sixth Sunday after Trinity in 1734. It filled a gap in his second annual cycle of chorale cantatas written for performance in Leipzig. In 1724, when he composed the cycle, he had an engagement in Köthen that Sunday, and therefore left the text for later completion. The cantata is based on a hymn "Es ist das Heil uns kommen her" by Paul Speratus, which was published in 1524 in the Achtliederbuch, the first Lutheran hymnal. The theme of the chorale is the Lutheran creed of salvation from sin by God's grace alone (justification by faith), summarized in the first stanza: "Deeds can never help, ... faith beholds Jesus Christ, ... He has become the Intercessor".

The prescribed readings for the Sunday are from the Epistle to the Romans, "By Christ's death we are dead for sin" (Romans 6:3–11), and from the Gospel of Matthew a passage from the Sermon on the Mount about better justice than the justice of merely observing laws and rules (Matthew 5:20–26). The hymn in 14 stanzas matches the topic of the gospel. An unknown poet transformed the first 12 stanzas of the chorale to seven cantata movements. Dropping the last two stanzas, the librettist retains the first stanza as the first movement, and the 12th as the last movement. He rephrased stanzas 2–4 to a recitative (2), stanzas 5–7 to a recitative (4), stanzas 9–11 to a third recitative (6). Ideas from stanza 8 were made an aria (5), and movement 3 is not derived directly from the chorale, but intensifies the conclusion of the first recitative. The three recitatives can be considered a sermon, according to Julian Mincham, who comments: "All three speak of God's Laws; their bestowal, their fulfillment (or lack of it) and our attitudes towards them", and who summarizes: "The three recitatives were clearly planned as a cognate group and encapsulate the fundamental Lutheran creed. The two intervening arias, and finally the chorale, reflect upon and extend their statements." The Bach scholar Christoph Wolff assumes that the text was already written for Bach's 1724 cycle of chorale cantatas by the same librettist.

Bach had used selected stanzas of the hymn before, in 1716 stanza 12 to conclude Mein Gott, wie lang, ach lange? BWV 155, in 1723 both stanza 12 and 11 to conclude the two parts of Ärgre dich, o Seele, nicht, BWV 186, and in 1724 stanza 11 to conclude Wahrlich, wahrlich, ich sage euch, BWV 86.

== Music ==
=== Structure and scoring ===
Bach structured the cantata in seven movements, framing by a chorale fantasia and a closing chorale a sequence of alternating recitatives and arias. He scored it for a chamber music ensemble of four vocal soloists (soprano (S), alto (A), tenor (T) and bass (B)), a four-part choir SATB, flauto traverso (Ft), oboe d'amore (Oa), two violins (Vl), one of them solo (Vs), viola (Va), and basso continuo (Bc). The autograph title page reads: "Dominica 6. post Trinitatis / Es ist das Heil uns kommen her / a / 4 Voci / 1 Traversa / 1 Hautb: d'Amour / 2 Violini / Viola / e / Continuo / di / Joh:Sebast:Bach".

In the following table of the movements, the scoring follows the Neue Bach-Ausgabe. The keys and time signatures are taken from Alfred Dürr, using the symbol for common time (4/4). The instruments are shown separately for winds and strings, while the continuo, playing throughout, is not shown.

Movements of Es ist das Heil uns kommen her
No.	Title	Text	Type	Vocal	Winds	Strings	Key	Time
1	Es ist das Heil uns kommen her	Speratus	Chorale fantasia	SATB	Ft Oa	2Vl Va	E major	3/4
2	Gott gab uns ein Gesetz	anon.	Recitative	B				common time
3	Wir waren schon zu tief gesunken	anon.	Aria	T		Vs	E minor	12/16
4	Doch mußte das Gesetz erfüllet werden	anon.	Recitative	B				common time
5	Herr, du siehst statt guter Werke	anon.	Duet aria	S A	Ft Oa		A major	2/4
6	Wenn wir die Sünd aus dem Gesetz erkennen	anon.	Recitative	B				common time
7	Ob sichs anließ, als wollt er nicht	Speratus	Chorale	SATB	Ft Oa	2Vl Va	E major	common time

=== Movements ===
==== 1 ====
The opening chorus, "Es ist das Heil uns kommen her" (It is our salvation come here to us), is a chorale fantasia, the vocal part embedded in a concerto of the instruments. The cantus firmus of the chorale melody is in the soprano in unadorned long notes, while the lower voices engage in imitation. The scoring with the obbligato instruments flute and oboe d'amore in contrast to the strings is unusual; sometimes the first violin also takes part in the concerto.

==== 2 ====
"Gott gab uns ein Gesetz" (God gave us the Law), is the first of three recitatives which are sung by the bass, almost like one sermon, which is only deepened by the two arias in between. The recitatives are secco with the exception of the final line of movement 4, "... und fest um Jesu Arme schlingt" (... embrace the arms of Jesus), which is rendered arioso, in "an enlightening major key, a tender vocal phrase and the late semi-quaver continuo line".

==== 3 ====
The tenor aria depicts the "sinking" of "Wir waren schon zu tief gesunken" (We were already too deeply sunk) in downward motifs and an irregular rhythm of syncopes, observed by Dürr as an image of "a giddy descent into the abyss of sin".

==== 4 ====
The bass continues the "sermon", "Doch mußte das Gesetz erfüllet werden" (Yet the Law must be fulfilled).

==== 5 ====
The duet "Herr, du siehst statt guter Werke" (Lord, you see, instead of good works) is set for five parts of equal weight, the soprano and alto voices, flute, oboe d'amore and continuo, in intricate canonic counterpoint in da capo form.

==== 6 ====
The bass concludes the "sermon", "Wenn wir die Sünd aus dem Gesetz erkennen" (When we recognize our sin against the Law).

==== 7 ====
The closing chorale, "Ob sichs anließ, als wollt er nicht" (Although it appears that He does not will it), is set for four parts. While Bach's closing chorales are often in simple homophony, the lower voices are set here in unusual polyphony.

== Recordings ==
The listing is taken from the selection on the Bach Cantatas Website. Recordings have traditionally been made by large symphonic groups, but increasingly in historically informed performances (HIP) by boys' choirs, chorales (Kantorei, choir dedicated to mostly church music), chamber choirs or groups with one voice per part (OVPP), and matching instrumental ensembles playing on Baroque period instruments. HIP and OVPPensembles are marked by green background.

Recordings of Es ist das Heil uns kommen her
Title	Conductor / Choir / Orchestra	Soloists	Label	Year	Choir type	Orch. type
J. S. Bach: Das Kantatenwerk • Complete Cantatas • Les Cantates, Folge / Vol. 3	Gustav Leonhardt King's College Choir Leonhardt-Consort	boy soloist of the Regensburger Domspatzen; Paul Esswood; Kurt Equiluz; Max van Egmond	Teldec	1972	Chamber	Period
Bach Cantatas Vol. 4 – Sundays after Trinity I	Karl Richter Münchener Bach-Chor Münchener Bach-Orchester	Edith Mathis; Julia Hamari; Peter Schreier; Dietrich Fischer-Dieskau	Archiv Produktion	1977		
Die Bach Kantate Vol. 8	Helmuth Rilling Gächinger Kantorei Württembergisches Kammerorchester Heilbronn	Ulrike Sonntag; Gabriele Schreckenbach; Adalbert Kraus; Wolfgang Schöne	Hänssler	1984	Chorale	Chamber
J. S. Bach: Cantatas BWV 9, 94 & 187	Sigiswald Kuijken La Petite Bande	Midori Suzuki; Magdalena Kožená; Knut Schoch; Jan van der Crabben	Deutsche Harmonia Mundi	1999	OVPP	Period
Bach Edition Vol. 14 – Cantatas Vol. 7	Pieter Jan Leusink Holland Boys Choir Netherlands Bach Collegium	Marjon Strijk; Sytse Buwalda; Nico van der Meel; Bas Ramselaar	Brilliant Classics	2000		Period
J. S. Bach: Cantatas Trinity Cantatas 4 Ansbach/Haddinton For the 6th Sunday after Trinity For the 7th Sunday after Trinity	John Eliot Gardiner Monteverdi Choir English Baroque Soloists	Joanne Lunn; Michael Chance; James Gilchrist; Stephen Varcoe	Archiv Produktion	2000	Chamber	Period
J. S. Bach: Complete Cantatas Vol. 20	Ton Koopman Amsterdam Baroque Orchestra & Choir	Sandrine Piau; Bogna Bartosz; James Gilchrist; Klaus Mertens	Antoine Marchand	2002	Chamber	Period
J. S. Bach: Cantatas Vol. 53	Masaaki Suzuki Bach Collegium Japan	Hana Blažíková; Robin Blaze; Gerd Türk; Peter Kooy	BIS	2012	Chamber	Period
