= Book of Common Order =

1556 liturgical book by John Knox

The Book of Common Order, originally titled The Forme of Prayers, is a liturgical book by John Knox written for use in the Reformed denomination. The text was composed in Geneva in 1556 and was adopted by the Church of Scotland in 1562. In 1567, Séon Carsuel (John Carswell) translated the book into Scottish Gaelic under the title Foirm na n-Urrnuidheadh. His translation became the first Gaelic text to be printed in Scotland. In 1996 the Church of Scotland produced "Leabhar Sheirbheisean", a Gaelic supplement to the Book of Common Order.

== History ==
=== Composition in Frankfurt and Geneva ===
When Mary I ascended to the throne in July 1553 upon the death of Edward VI, she began a campaign to restore Catholicism to England. Several hundred wealthy Protestants fled Britain, and around 200 settled in Frankfurt in June 1554. The group in Frankfurt included a mix of Anglicans and Calvinists, and John Knox was called on to serve as their minister. The congregation was unable to agree whether to use the Anglican Book of Common Prayer or John Calvin's Catéchisme de l'Église de Genève, as translated by William Huycke in 1550 as The Form of Common Prayers Used in the Churches of Geneva. The congregation decided to write a new liturgical book, and in January 1555 Knox and three other Calvinists composed a text based on Huycke's translation. The Anglican component of the group disliked the text and it went largely unused. A new group consisting of the Calvinists Knox and Whittingham, and the Anglicans Parry and Lever wrote another text, based on the Book of Common Prayer, that was accepted by the congregation. In March of that year, a new contingent of Anglicans arrived and forced Knox out.

Knox moved to Geneva, and along with a group of English exiles, formed a new congregation at Notre-Dame-la-Neuve Chapel. The congregation devised a new liturgy based on the rejected manuscript the Knox group wrote in January 1555. The text was printed by Jean Crespin and was completed on 10 February 1556 under the title The Forme of Prayers.

=== Adoption in Scotland ===
After Mary I died in November 1558, the Protestant exiles began to return to Britain and brought with the Forme of Prayers. Knox returned to Scotland in May 1560. By 1562 the new Church of Scotland adopted the text, which is called the Book of Common Order. The first Scottish editions were printed in 1564.

The Genevan Book of Order, sometimes called The Order of Geneva or Knox's Liturgy, is a directory for public worship in the Reformed Church of Scotland. In 1557 the Scottish Protestant lords in council enjoined the use of the English Common Prayer, i.e. the Second Book of Edward VI of 1552. Meanwhile, at Frankfurt, among the English Protestant exiles, there was a controversy between the upholders of the English liturgy and the French Reformed Order of Worship. By way of compromise, John Knox and other ministers drew up a new liturgy based upon earlier Continental Reformed Services, which was not deemed satisfactory, but which on his removal to Geneva he published in 1556 for the use of the English congregations in that city.

The Geneva book made its way to Scotland and was used by some Reformed congregations there. Knox's return in 1559 strengthened its position, and in 1562 the General Assembly enjoined the uniform use of it as the Book of Our Common Order in the administration of the Sacraments and Solemnization of Marriages and Burials of the Dead. In 1564 a new and enlarged edition was printed in Edinburgh, and the Assembly ordered that every Minister, exhorter and reader should have a copy and use the Order contained therein not only for marriage and the sacraments but also in prayer, thus ousting the hitherto permissible use of the Second Book of Edward VI at ordinary service.

The rubrics as retained from the Book of Geneva made provision for an extempore prayer before the sermons and allowed the minister some latitude in the other two prayers. The forms for the special services were more strictly imposed, but liberty was also given to vary some of the prayers in them. The rubrics of the Scottish portion of the book are somewhat stricter, and, indeed, one or two of the Geneva rubrics were made more absolute in the Scottish emendations; but no doubt the Book of Common Order is best described as a discretionary liturgy.

It will be convenient here to give the contents of the edition printed by Andrew Hart at Edinburgh in 1611 and described (as was usually the case) as The Psalmes of David in Meeter, with the Prose, whereunto is added Prayers commonly used in the Kirke, and private houses; with a perpetuall Kalendar and all the Changes of the Moone that shall happen for the space of Six Veeres to come. They are as follows:

- (i.) The Calendar;
- (ii.) The names of the Faires of Scotland;
- (iii.) The Confession of Faith used at Geneva and received by the Church of Scotland;
- (iv.-vii.) Concerning the election and duties of Ministers, Elders and Deacons, and Superintendent;
- (viii.) An order of Ecclesiastical Discipline;
- (ix.) The Order of Excommunication and of Public Repentance;
- (x.) The Visitation of the Sick;
- (xi.) The Manner of Burial;
- (xii.) The Order of Public Worship; Forms of Confession and Prayer after Sermon;
- (xiii.) Other Public Prayers;
- (xiv.) The Administration of the Lords Supper;
- (xv.) The Form of Marriage;
- (xvi.) The Order of Baptism;
- (xvii.) A Treatise on Fasting with the order thereof;
- (xviii.) The Psalms of David;
- (xix.) Conclusions or Doxologies;
- (xx.) Hymns; metrical versions of the Decalogue, Magnificat, Apostles' Creed, etc.;
- (xxi.) Calvin's Catechism; and
- (xxii. and xxiii.) Prayers for Private Houses and Miscellaneous Prayers, e.g. for a man before he begins his work.

The Psalms and Catechism together occupy more than half the book. The chapter on burial is significant. In place of the long office of the Catholic Church we have simply this statement:

"The corpse is reverently brought to the grave, accompanied with the Congregation, without any further ceremonies: which being buried, the Minister [if he be present and required] goeth to the Church, if it be not far off, and maketh some comfortable exhortation to the people, touching death and resurrection." This (with the exception of the bracketed words) was taken over from the Book of Geneva. The Westminster Directory which superseded the Book of Common Order also enjoins interment without any ceremony, such being stigmatized as no way beneficial to the dead and many ways hurtful to the living. Civil honors may, however, be rendered.

George Washington Sprott and Thomas Leishman, in the introduction to their edition of the Book of Common Order, and of the Westminster Directory published in 1868, collected a valuable series of notices as to the actual usage of the former book for the period (1564–1645) during which it was enjoined by ecclesiastical law. Where ministers were not available suitable persons (often old priests, sometimes schoolmasters) were selected as readers. Good contemporary accounts of Scottish worship are those of William Cowper of Galloway (1568–1619), bishop of Galloway, in his Seven Days Conference between a Catholic, Christian and a Catholic Roman (c. 1615), and Alexander Henderson in The Government and Order, of the Church of Scotland (1641). There was doubtless a good deal of variety at different times and in different localities. Early in the 17th century under the twofold influence of the Dutch Church, with which the Scottish clergy were in close connection, and of James VI's endeavours to jostle out a liturgy which gave the liberty of conceiving prayers, ministers began in prayer to read less and extemporize more.

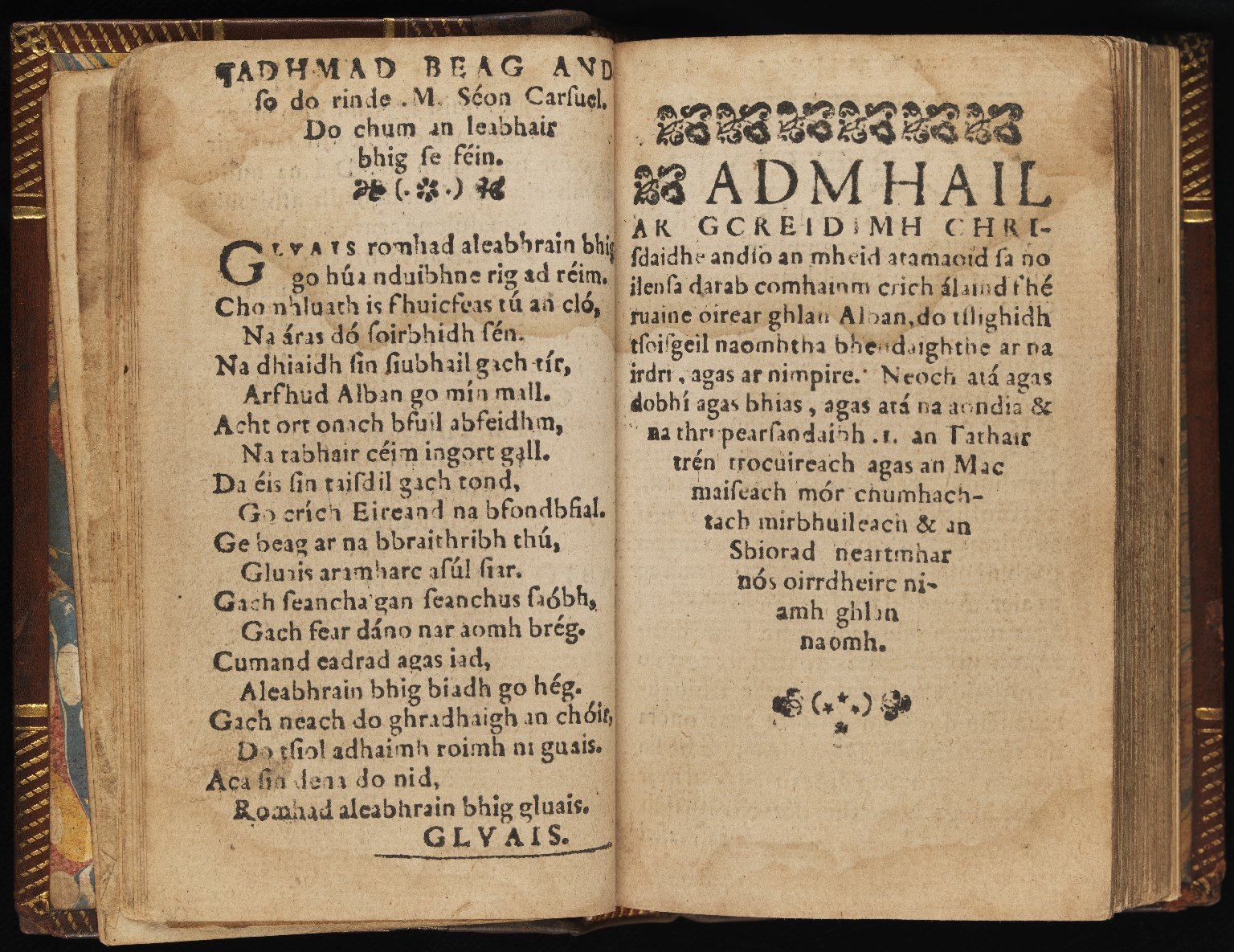
Frontispiece to the 1567 Scots Gaelic translation.

Turning again to the legislative history, in 1567 the prayers were translated into Gaelic; in 1579 Parliament ordered all gentlemen and yeomen holding property of a certain value to possess copies. The assembly of 1601 declined to alter any of the existing prayers but expressed a willingness to admit new ones. Between 1606 and 1618 various attempts were made under English and Episcopal influence, by assemblies afterwards declared unlawful, to set aside the Book of Common Order. The efforts of James VI, Charles I and Archbishop Laud proved fruitless; in 1637 the reading of Laud's draft of a new form of service based on the English prayer book led to riots in Edinburgh and to general discontent in the country.

The General Assembly of Glasgow in 1638 abjured Laud's book and took its stand again by the Book of Common Order, an act repeated by the assembly of 1639, which also demurred against innovations proposed by the English separatists, who objected altogether to liturgical forms, and in particular to the Lord's Prayer, the Gloria Patri and the minister kneeling for private devotion in the pulpit. An Aberdeen printer named Raban was publicly censured for having on his own authority shortened one of the prayers. The following years witnessed a counter attempt to introduce the Scottish liturgy into England, especially for those who in the southern kingdom were inclined to Presbyterianism. This effort culminated in the Westminster Assembly of divines which met in 1643, at which six commissioners from the Church of Scotland were present, and joined in the task of drawing up a Common Confession, Catechism and Directory for the three kingdoms.

The commissioners reported to the General Assembly of 1644 that this Common Directory is so begun . . . "that we could not think upon any particular Directory for our own Kirk." The General Assembly of 1645, after careful study, approved the new order. An act of Assembly on 3 February and an act of parliament on 6 February ordered its use in every church, and henceforth, though there was no act setting aside the Book of Common Order, the Westminster Directory was of primary authority. The Directory was meant simply to make known the general heads, the sense and scope of the Prayers and other parts of Public Worship, and if need be, to give a help and furniture. The act of parliament recognizing the Directory was annulled at the Restoration and the book has never since been acknowledged by a civil authority in Scotland. But General Assemblies have frequently recommended its use, and worship in Presbyterian churches is largely conducted on the lines of the Westminster Assembly's Directory.

The subsequent Book of Common Order or Euchologion was a compilation drawn from various sources and issued by the Church Service Society, an organisation which endeavoured to promote liturgical usages within the Church of Scotland.

== Twentieth century ==
The Church of Scotland published revised editions of the Book of Common Order in 1940, 1979 and 1994. There are considerable differences between these three editions. The 1994 edition (now known simply as Common Order) attempts to use inclusive language and has deliberately moved away from the use of archaic language; there is even a prayer for space research. In 1996 the Church of Scotland published "Leabhar Sheirbheisean", a Gaelic supplement to the Book of Common Order.

== See also ==
- Church of Scotland
- Metrical psalter
- Presbyterianism
- Scottish Psalter
- Scottish Reformation

=== Anabaptist ===
- Ausbund

=== Anglican ===
- Book of Common Prayer
- Whole Book of Psalms

=== Lutheran ===
- First Lutheran hymnal
- Erfurt Enchiridion
- Eyn geystlich Gesangk Buchleyn
- Swenske songer eller wisor 1536
- Thomissøn's hymnal

=== Reformed ===
- Souterliedekens
- Genevan Psalter
