= Sie ist mir lieb, die werte Magd =

- Hymn by Martin Luther
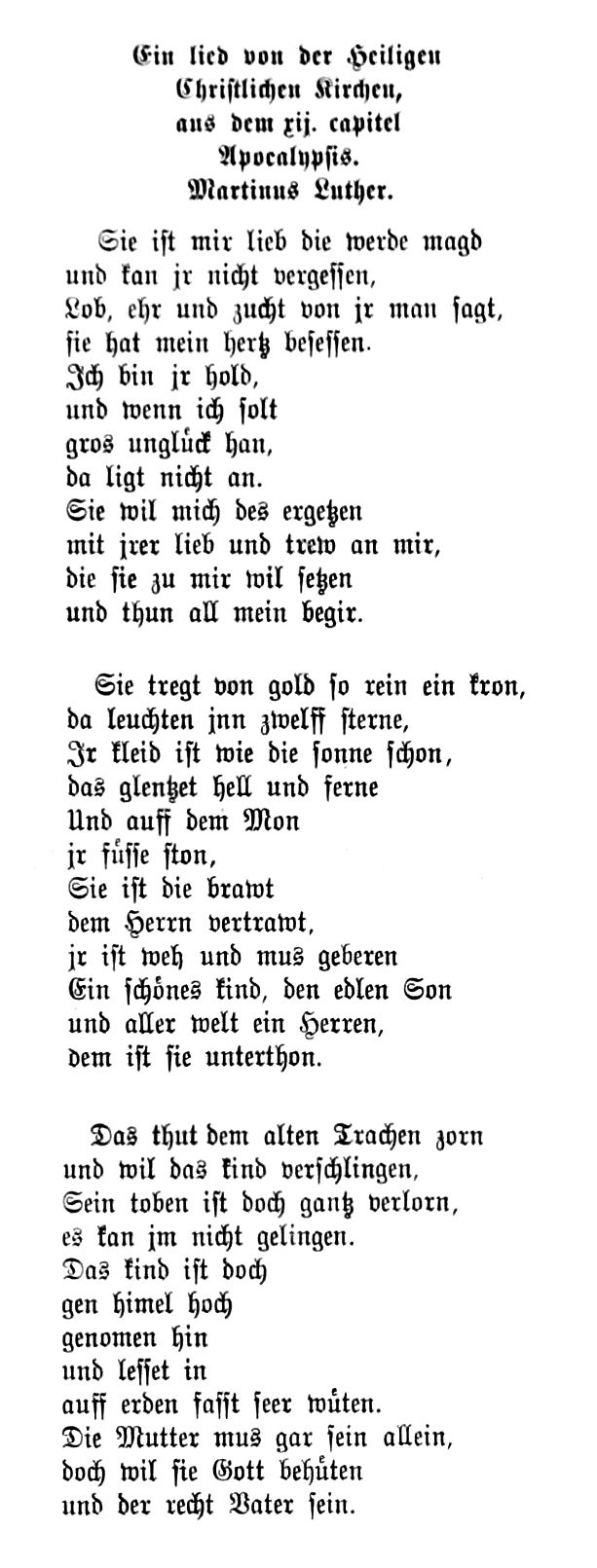
- The hymn in three stanzas in a later print
- Text: by Martin Luther
- Language: German
- Published: 1535

"Sie ist mir lieb, die werte Magd" ("She is dear to me, the precious maid") is a Lutheran hymn by Martin Luther, first published in the Klugsches Gesangbuch (Klug hymnal). The subtitle is Ein Lied von der heiligen christlichen Kirche, aus dem 12. Kapitel der Offenb. Joh. (A song of the holy Christian church, from chapter 12 of the Revelation of John).

== See also ==
- List of hymns by Martin Luther

== Literature ==
- Wilhelm Lucke: Sie ist mir lieb die werte Magd. In: D. Martin Luthers Werke. Kritische Gesamtausgabe, vol. 35, Weimar 1923, pp. 254–257
- Kurt Aland (ed.), Luther Deutsch, 2nd edition. 1966, vol. 6, pp 284f. and 361
