= Erfurt Enchiridion =

Second Lutheran hymnal published in 1524

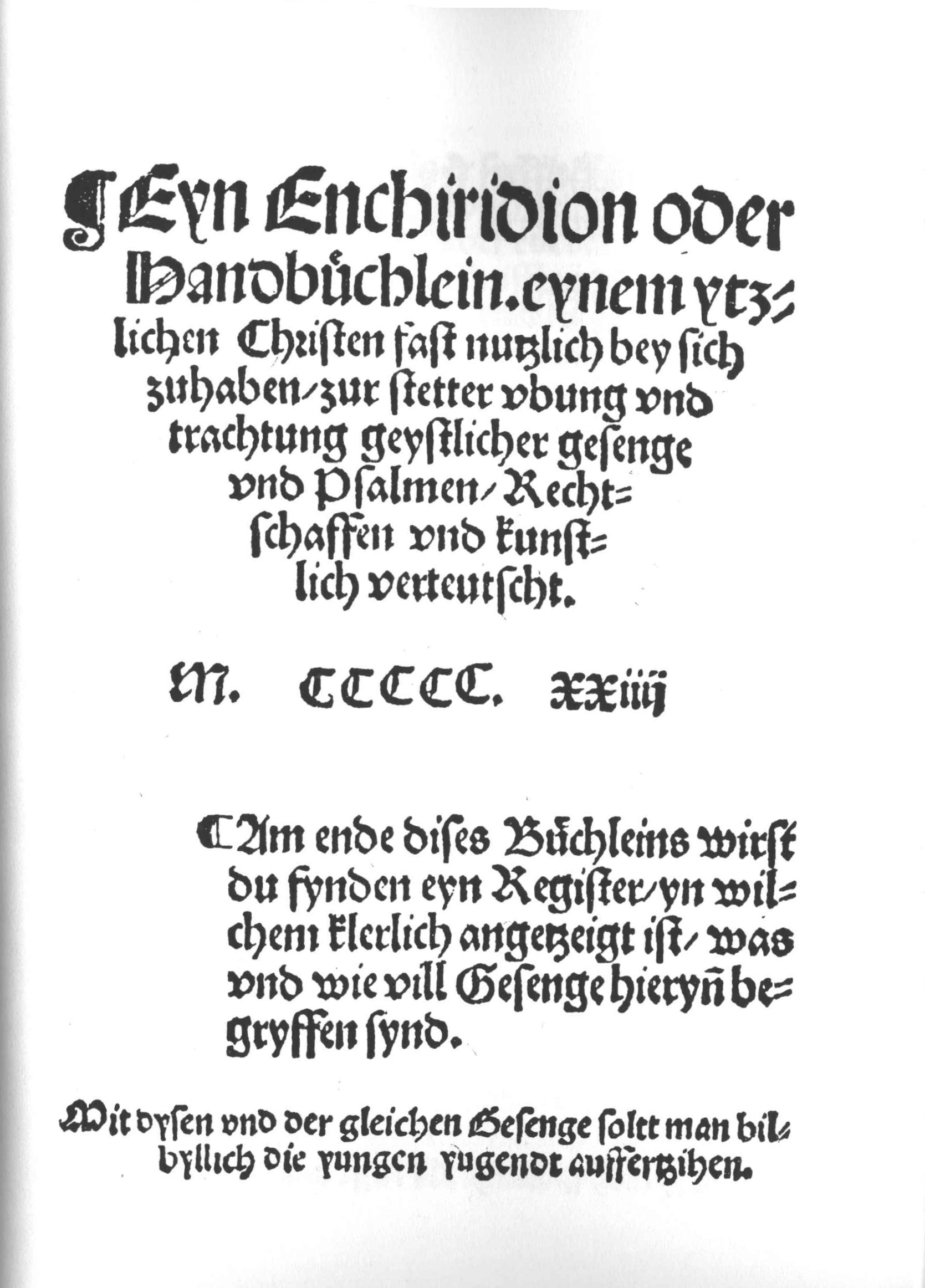
Title page of the Loersfeld edition

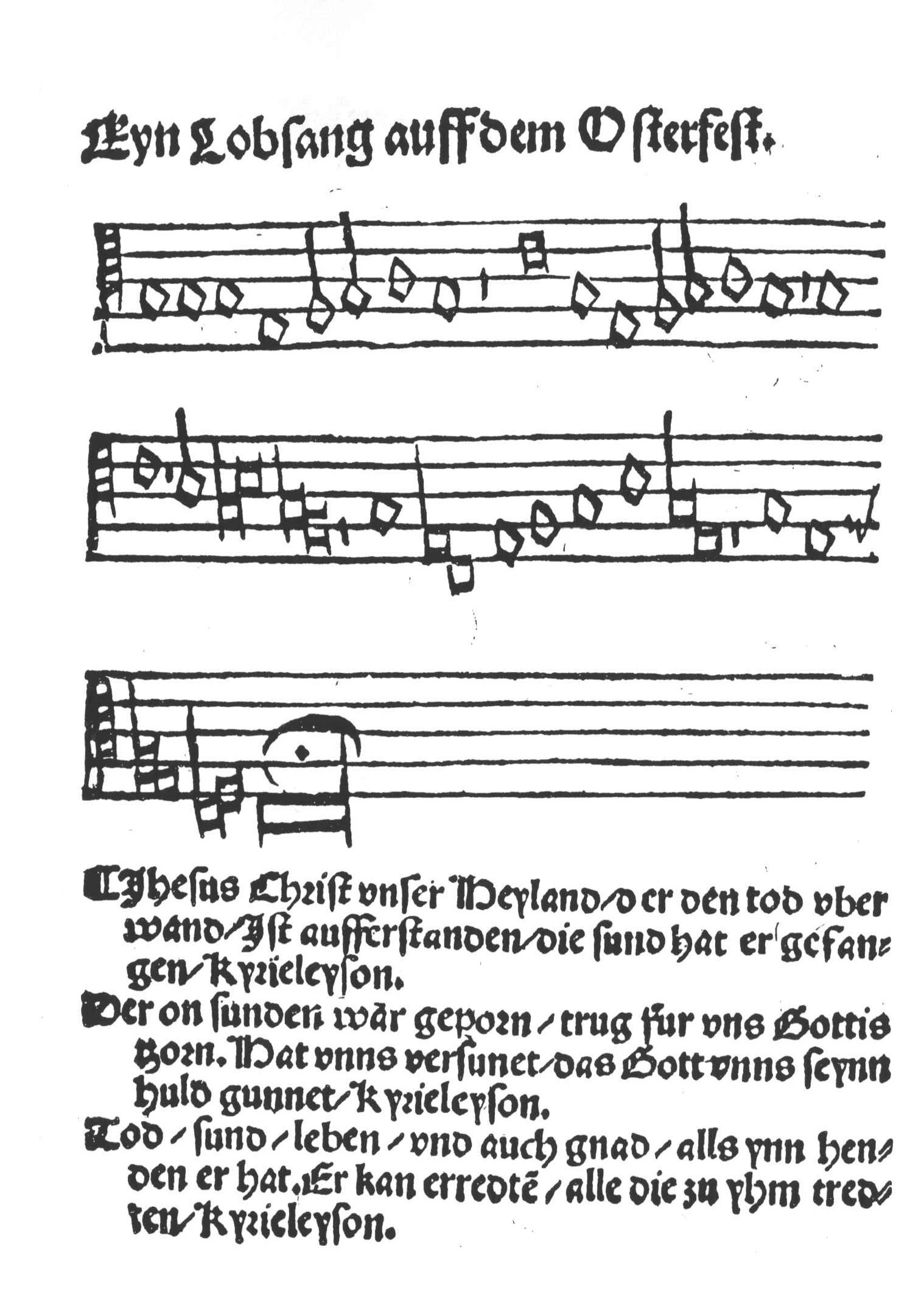
The song "Jesus Christus, unser Heiland, der den Tod überwand" (Jesus Christ, our saviour, who overcame death) by Martin Luther, titled "Ein Lobgesang auf dem Osterfest" (A song of praise on the Easter feast)

The Erfurt Enchiridion (enchiridion, from Ancient Greek: ἐγχειρίδιον, hand book) is the second Lutheran hymnal. It appeared in 1524 in Erfurt in two competing editions. One of them contains 26 songs, the other 25, 18 of them by Martin Luther, others by Elisabeth Cruciger, Erhard Hegenwald, Justus Jonas and Paul Speratus. While the songs of the Enchiridion could be used in churches, they were intended primarily for singing elsewhere, such as at home, at court, and in guild meetings.

== History ==
The songs of the reformer Luther and others were first sold as broadsheets, and contributed to the spreading of Protestant ideas. They were printed in collections, beginning with the First Lutheran hymnal, called the Achtliederbuch, and with the Wittenberg song book, both published in 1524. The Erfurt Enchiridion appeared the same year, in two almost equal editions by two different printers, Johannes Loersfeld and Matthes Maler. Both books are identical except for one song. The double appearance suggests that there was a great demand. Probably the edition printed by Loersfeld came first, to be copied by Maler.

== Description ==
The version of Loersfeld was printed in octavo, and includes 48 pages, 47 of them printed. It contains 25 songs, the German version of the creed and a two-page anonymous preface. The version of Maler contains one song more. Sixteen different choral melodies are used, and eighteen of the songs are by Luther, but his name is attached to only one of them. Three of the hymns were written by Paul Speratus, one or two by Justus Jonas, one by Elisabeth Cruciger, and one is attributed to Jan Hus. The arrangement of the songs is not systematic, and only seven paraphrases of psalms form a cohesive group. Five songs are German rhymed versions of Latin liturgical chants. The song "Ein neues Lied wir heben an" (A new song we begin) describes the execution in Brussels of two monks who were martyrs of the Reformation, Hendrik Vos and Johannes van Esschen.

The title describes: "Eyn Enchiridion oder Handbüchlein. eynem ytzlichen Christen fast nutzlich bey sich zuhaben / zur stetter vbung vnd trachtung geystlicher gesenge vnd Psalmen / Rechtschaffen vnd kunstlich verteutscht." (An Enchiridion or little handbook; for every Christian very useful to keep at hand / for continuous practice and contemplation of spiritual songs and psalms / honestly and artfully translated to German.)

The author of the preface describes the former ecclesiastical chant as "shouting like the priests of Baal in unintelligible cries" and "cry like the forest-donkeys to a deaf God". The songs included in the collection are described as founded on scripture, serving improvement, doctrine, and the education of youth, and the preface suggests that a Christian should always carry the book with him, for constant practise. While the songs of the Enchiridion could be used in churches, they were intended primarily for singing elsewhere, such as at home, at court, and in guild meetings.

Many of the songs of the Erfurt Enchiridion were widely disseminated, and seventeen are still in the current German Protestant hymnal Evangelisches Gesangbuch, some of them now with different melodies. Five of the hymns are part of the Catholic hymnal Gotteslob.

Translations began with Goostly psalms and spiritual songes drawen out of the holy Scripture by Myles Coverdale, the so-called "first English hymn book", which was printed in London in 1555 and contained 16 of the songs from the Enchiridion (1–5, 8, 10, 12–19, 22).

== Hymns ==
Number	Title	Author	Note
1	Dies sind die heilgen Zehn Gebot	Martin Luther	
2	Nun freut euch, lieben Christen g'mein	Martin Luther	in Achtliederbuch
3	Es ist das Heil uns kommen her	Paul Speratus	in Achtliederbuch
4	Mitten wir im Leben sind	Martin Luther	after Media vita in morte sumus
5	In Gott gelaub ich, daß er hat	Paul Speratus	in Achtliederbuch
6	Hilf Gott, wie ist der Menschen Not	Paul Speratus	in Achtliederbuch
7	Gott sei gelobet und gebenedeiet	Martin Luther	not in the Maler edition
8	Gelobet seist du, Jesu Christ	Martin Luther	
9	Ich glaube an einen Gott		Apostles' Creed
10	Herr Christ, der einig Gotts Sohn	Elisabeth Cruciger	
11	Jesus Christus, unser Heiland, der von uns den Gotteszorn wandt	Martin Luther	after Jan Hus
12	Wohl dem, der in Gottes Furcht steht	Martin Luther	after Psalm 128
13	Ach Gott, vom Himmel sieh darein	Martin Luther	after Psalm 12, in Achtliederbuch
14	Wo Gott der Herr nicht bei uns hält	Justus Jonas	after Psalm 124
15	Es spricht der Unweisen Mund wohl	Martin Luther	after Psalm 14, in Achtliederbuch
16	Es woll uns Gott genädig sein	Martin Luther	after Psalm 67
17	Aus tiefer Not schrei ich zu dir	Martin Luther	after Psalm 130, De profundis, in Achtliederbuch
18	Erbarm dich mein, o Herre Gott	Erhard Hegenwald	after Psalm 51 Miserere
19	Christ lag in Todesbanden	Martin Luther	
20	Jesus Christus, unser Heiland, der den Tod überwand	Martin Luther	
21	Nun komm, der Heiden Heiland	Martin Luther	after Veni redemptor gentium} by Ambrose
22	Komm, Heiliger Geist, Herre Gott	Martin Luther	after "Veni Sancte Spiritus, reple tuorum corda fidelium"
23	Christum wir sollen loben schon	Martin Luther	after A solis ortus cardine
24	Komm, Gott Schöpfer, Heiliger Geist	Martin Luther	after Veni Creator Spiritus
25	Ein neues Lied wir heben an	Martin Luther	
26	In Jesu Nam'n heben wir an	unknown	in Achtliederbuch, possibly by Jonas

== See also ==
- List of hymns by Martin Luther
- Metrical psalter

Lutheran

- First Lutheran hymnal
- Eyn geystlich Gesangk Buchleyn
- Swenske songer eller wisor 1536
- Thomissøn's hymnal

Anabaptist

- Ausbund

Anglican

- Book of Common Prayer
- Whole Book of Psalms

Presbyterian

- Book of Common Order
- Scottish Psalter

Reformed

- Souterliedekens
- Genevan Psalter

== Bibliography ==
- Full digital facsimile and diplomatic transcription of the hymnbook in the Deutsches Text Archiv
- Brodersen, Christiane; Brodersen, Kai (2008). Ein Enchiridion oder Handbüchlein geistlicher Gesänge und Psalmen (Erfurt 1524) (in German). Kartoffeldruck-Verlag, Speyer. ISBN 978-3-939526-03-2.
- Doukhan, Lilianne (2010). In Tune With God. mn House Publishing. pp. 163, 164 & footnote 15 on p. 191.
- Herbst, Wolfgang (2001). Wer ist wer im Gesangbuch? (in German). Vandenhoeck & Ruprecht, Göttingen. pp. 86–87 Erfurter Enchiridion (Handbüchlein). ISBN 3525503237.
- Liersch, Helmut (2013). Ein Unikat in der Marktkirchen-Bibliothek Goslar: Das Erfurter Färbefaß-Enchiridion von 1524. Goslar: Goslarsches Forum 6, ed. Otmar Hesse. pp. 40–44, 81–83.
- Henrike Lähnemann (2017): Das Erfurter ‘Enchiridion’ in der Goslarer Marktkirchen-Bibliothek, in: Marktkirchen-Bibliothek Goslar. Beiträge zur Erforschung der reformationszeitlichen Sammlung, Regensburg: Schell und Steiner, ed. Helmut Liersch, pp. 232–243.
