= Eyn geystlich Gesangk Buchleyn =

Lutheran hymnal by Johann Walter and Martin Luther

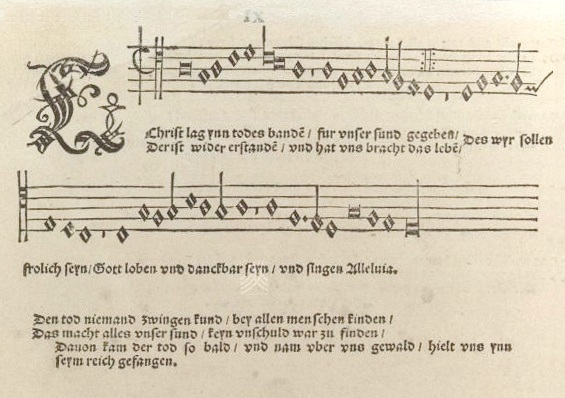
- "Christ lag in Todes Banden", tenor part
- Editor: Johann Walter
- Author: Martin Luther and others
- Language: German
- Genre: Hymnal for choir
- Published: 1524

Eyn geystlich Gesangk Buchleyn ("A spiritual song booklet"), was the first German hymnal for choir, published in Wittenberg in 1524 by Johann Walter who collaborated with Martin Luther. It contains 32 sacred songs, including 24 by Luther, in settings by Walter for three to five parts with the melody in the tenor. Luther wrote a preface for the part books. The collection has been called the root of all Protestant song music.

== History ==
Martin Luther used hymns in German to affirm his ideas of reformation and to have the congregation actively take part in church services. Eyn geystlich Gesangk Buchleyn was the third German hymnal, after the "Achtliederbuch", published in Nürnberg by Jobst Gutnecht, and the "Erfurt Enchiridion", published in Erfurt, both also dating from 1524. Eyn geystlich Gesangk Buchleyn was published in Wittenberg and is often referred to as the first Wittenberg hymnal. It came with a foreword by Martin Luther:

... auf daß dadurch Gottes Wort und christliche Lehre auf allerlei Weise getrieben und geübt werden. Demnach habe ich auch samt etlichen andern zum guten Anfang und Ursach zu geben denen, die es besser vermögen, etliche geistliche Lieder zusammenbracht, das heilige Evangelion, so itzt von Gottes Gnaden wieder aufgangen ist, zu treiben und in Schwang zu bringen ... Auch daß ich nicht der Meinung bin, daß durchs Evangelion sollten alle Künste zu Boden geschlagen werden, sondern ich wollt alle Künste, sonderlich die musica, gerne sehen im Dienst des, der sie geben und geschaffen hat.

That it is good, and pleasing to God, for us to sing spiritual songs is, I think, a truth whereof no Christian can be ignorant. Accordingly, to make a good beginning and to encourage others who can do it better, I have myself, with some others, put together a few hymns, in order to bring into full play the blessed Gospel, which by God’s grace hath again risen. These songs have been set in four parts, for no other reason than because I wished to provide our young people (who both will and ought to be instructed in music and other sciences) with something by which they might rid themselves of amorous and carnal songs, and so apply themselves to what is good with pleasure, as behooves the young.

The collection was the first German collection of hymns for choir and was published in Wittenberg in 1524 by Johann Walter, who collaborated with Luther. The hymnal comprised originally 32 songs, 24 of which were written by Luther, including "Gelobet seist du, Jesu Christ" and "Mit Fried und Freud ich fahr dahin". The settings are for three, four, and five parts (SATTB), with the melody in the tenor. Nine of the songs are psalms paraphrased in metric stanzas, such as "Aus tiefer Not schrei ich zu dir", a paraphrase of Psalm 130. The order of the songs does not seem to follow a plan, but groupings are apparent, such as Latin songs being placed at the end, preceded by five songs about the topics of the creed and the Trinity:

1. Gott, der Vater, wohn uns bei (Luther)
2. Wir glauben all an einen Gott (Luther)
3. Es ist das Heil uns kommen her (Speratus)
4. Hilf Gott, wie ist der Menschen Not (Speratus)
5. In Gott gelaub ich, das er hat (Speratus)

Four of the songs had been part of the Achtliederbuch, the first Lutheran hymnal.

Walter continued to revise and enlarge the 1524 "Wittenberg hymnal", adding more songs, and it was reprinted in 1529, 1531, 1533, 1535, and 1543. This culminated in an edition titled Geystliche Lieder, prefaced by Luther and published by Valentin Babst in Leipzig in 1545 shortly before Luther's death.

Contemporaneous editions of hymnals for lay people followed the organization of Luther's choral "Wittenberg hymnal" rather closely. For example, the Wittenberg Enchiridion of 1526 (full title Enchyridion of Spiritual Songs and Psalms for the Laity, Improved with Many More than Previously). contained ten more songs, with seven of them placed at the end and two others following a song with the same melody. This edition was copied in hymnals in Zurich in 1528 and in Leipzig in 1530. Eyn geystlich Gesangk Buchleyn has been called the root of all Protestant song music ("Grundstock aller evangelischer Liedmusik").

== Editions ==
- Walter, Johann / Kade, Otto: Wittembergisch Geistlich Gesangbuch, von 1524; zu drei, vier und fünf Stimmen, Neue Partitur-Ausgabe nebst Klavierauszug / von Otto Kade, Berlin, 1878 (Digitalisat)

== See also ==
- List of hymns by Martin Luther
- Metrical psalter

Lutheran

- First Lutheran hymnal
- Erfurt Enchiridion
- Swenske songer eller wisor 1536
- Thomissøn's hymnal

Anabaptist

- Ausbund

Anglican

- Book of Common Prayer
- Whole Book of Psalms

Presbyterian

- Book of Common Order
- Scottish Psalter

Reformed

- Souterliedekens
- Genevan Psalter
