= List of hymns by Martin Luther =

Hymns by Martin Luther
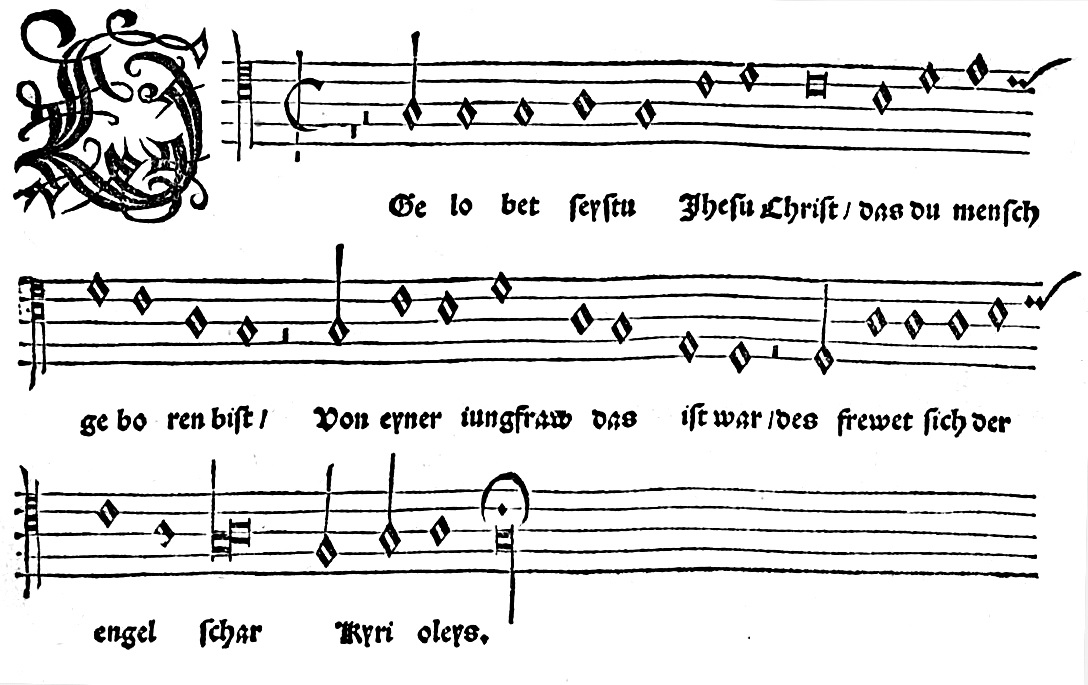
- "Gelobet seystu Jhesu Christ" in Walter's Eyn geystlich Gesangk Buchleyn
- Written: 1524–1541
- Language: German

The reformer Martin Luther, a prolific hymnodist, regarded music and especially hymns in German as important means for the development of faith.

Luther wrote songs for occasions of the liturgical year (Advent, Christmas, Purification, Epiphany, Easter, Pentecost, Trinity), hymns on topics of the catechism (Ten Commandments, Lord's Prayer, creed, baptism, confession, Eucharist), paraphrases of psalms, and other songs. Whenever Luther went out from pre-existing texts, here listed as "text source" (bible, Latin and German hymns), he widely expanded, transformed and personally interpreted them.

Luther worked on the tunes, sometimes modifying older tunes, in collaboration with Johann Walter. Hymns were published in the Achtliederbuch, in Walter's choral hymnal Eyn geystlich Gesangk Buchleyn (Wittenberg) and the Erfurt Enchiridion (Erfurt) in 1524, and in the Klugsches Gesangbuch, among others. For more information, see Martin Luther § Hymnodist.

== List ==
Hymn	Text	Publication	Tune	Notes
Nun freut euch, lieben Christen g'mein		1524, Achtliederbuch No. 1	mel. #1	Both mel. by Luther
Nun freut euch, lieben Christen g'mein		1529, Klugsches Gesangbuch	mel. #2	Both mel. by Luther
Ach Gott, vom Himmel sieh darein	after Psalm 12	1524, Achtliederbuch No. 5		
Es spricht der Unweisen Mund wohl	after Psalm 14	1524, Achtliederbuch No. 6		
Aus tiefer Not schrei ich zu dir	after Psalm 130	1524, Achtliederbuch No. 7		4 stanzas
Aus tiefer Not schrei ich zu dir	after Psalm 130	1524, Erfurt Enchiridion No. 17		5 stanzas
Dies sind die heilgen zehn Gebot	after Ten Commandments	1524, Erfurt Enchiridion No. 1		
Mitten wir im Leben sind	after "Media vita in morte sumus"	1524, Erfurt Enchiridion No. 4		
Gott sei gelobet und gebenedeiet		1524, Erfurt Enchiridion No. 7		Loersfeld edition only
Gelobet seist du, Jesu Christ	song of praise	1524, Erfurt Enchiridion No. 8		
Jesus Christus, unser Heiland, der von uns	after "Jesus Christus nostra salus"	1524, Erfurt Enchiridion No. 11		Eucharist
Wohl dem, der in Gottesfurcht steht	after Psalm 128	1524, Erfurt Enchiridion No. 12		
Es woll uns Gott genädig sein	after Psalm 67	1524, Erfurt Enchiridion No. 16		
Christ lag in Todesbanden	after "Christ ist erstanden"	1524, Erfurt Enchiridion No. 19		Resurrection of Jesus
Jesus Christus, unser Heiland, der den Tod		1524, Erfurt Enchiridion No. 20	mel. #1	Easter
Jesus Christus, unser Heiland, der den Tod		1529	mel. #2	Easter
Nun komm, der Heiden Heiland	after "Veni redemptor gentium"	1524, Erfurt Enchiridion No. 21		Advent
Komm, Heiliger Geist, Herre Gott	after "Veni Sancte Spiritus, reple..."	1524, Erfurt Enchiridion No. 22		Pentecost
Christum wir sollen loben schon	after "A solis ortus cardine"	1524, Erfurt Enchiridion No. 23		Christmas
Komm, Gott Schöpfer, Heiliger Geist	after "Veni Creator Spiritus"	1524, Erfurt Enchiridion No. 24		Pentecost
Ein neues Lied wir heben an		1524, Erfurt Enchiridion No. 25		Luther's first hymn
Nun bitten wir den Heiligen Geist	after "Veni Sancte Spiritus"	1524, Gesangbüchlein No. 1		Pentecost
Mensch, willst du leben seliglich	after Ten Commandments	1524, Gesangbüchlein No. 19		
Mit Fried und Freud ich fahr dahin	after "Nunc dimittis" (Lk 2:29–32)	1524, Gesangbüchlein No. 27		
Wär Gott nicht mit uns diese Zeit	after Psalm 124	1524, Gesangbüchlein No. 28		
Gott der Vater wohn uns bei		1524, Gesangbüchlein No. 34		Trinity
Wir glauben all an einen Gott	after Nicene Creed	1524, Gesangbüchlein No. 35		
Jesaja, dem Propheten, das geschah	after Isaiah 6	1526		Sanctus (Der Sanctus Deutsch)
Christe, du Lamm Gottes	after "Agnus Dei"	1528		
Ein feste Burg ist unser Gott	after Psalm 46	1529		"A Mighty Fortress Is Our God"
Herr Gott, dich loben wir	after "Te Deum"	1529, Klugsches Gesangbuch		
Verleih uns Frieden gnädiglich	after "Da pacem Domine" (hymn)	1529, Klugsches Gesangbuch		
Meine Seele erhebt den Herren	Magnificat (Lk 1:46–55)	1532	chant	prose
Sie ist mir lieb, die werte Magd	after Revelation 12	1535		
Vom Himmel hoch, da komm ich her	after Luke 2:8–14	1535	mel. #1	Christmas
Vom Himmel hoch, da komm ich her	after Luke 2:8–14	1539	mel. #2	Christmas
Kyrie, Gott Vater in Ewigkeit	after "Kyrie, fons bonitatis"	1537/1538?		Kyrie eleison
Die beste Zeit im Jahr ist mein		1538		
Vater unser im Himmelreich	after Lord's Prayer	1539		
Erhalt uns, Herr, bei deinem Wort		1542		
Christ unser Herr zum Jordan kam		1543		Baptism
Der du bist drei in Einigkeit	after "O lux beata Trinitas"	1543		Trinity
Vom Himmel kam der Engel Schar	after Luke 2:8–14	1543		Christmas
Deutsche Litanei (German Litany)	after Litany of the Saints			
Was fürchtst du Feind Herodes sehr	after "Hostis Herodes impie"			

Other hymns sometimes ascribed to Luther but not listed above include "All Her und Lob soll Gottes sein", "Unser große Sünde und schwere Missetat", "Christ ist erstanden", and "Nun laßt uns den Leib begraben".

== See also ==
- Martin Luther § Hymnodist
- Hymnody of continental Europe § Reformation
