= Aus tiefer Not schrei ich zu dir, BWV 38 =

Church cantata by Johann Sebastian Bach

Aus tiefer Not schrei ich zu dir
- BWV 38
- Chorale cantata by J. S. Bach
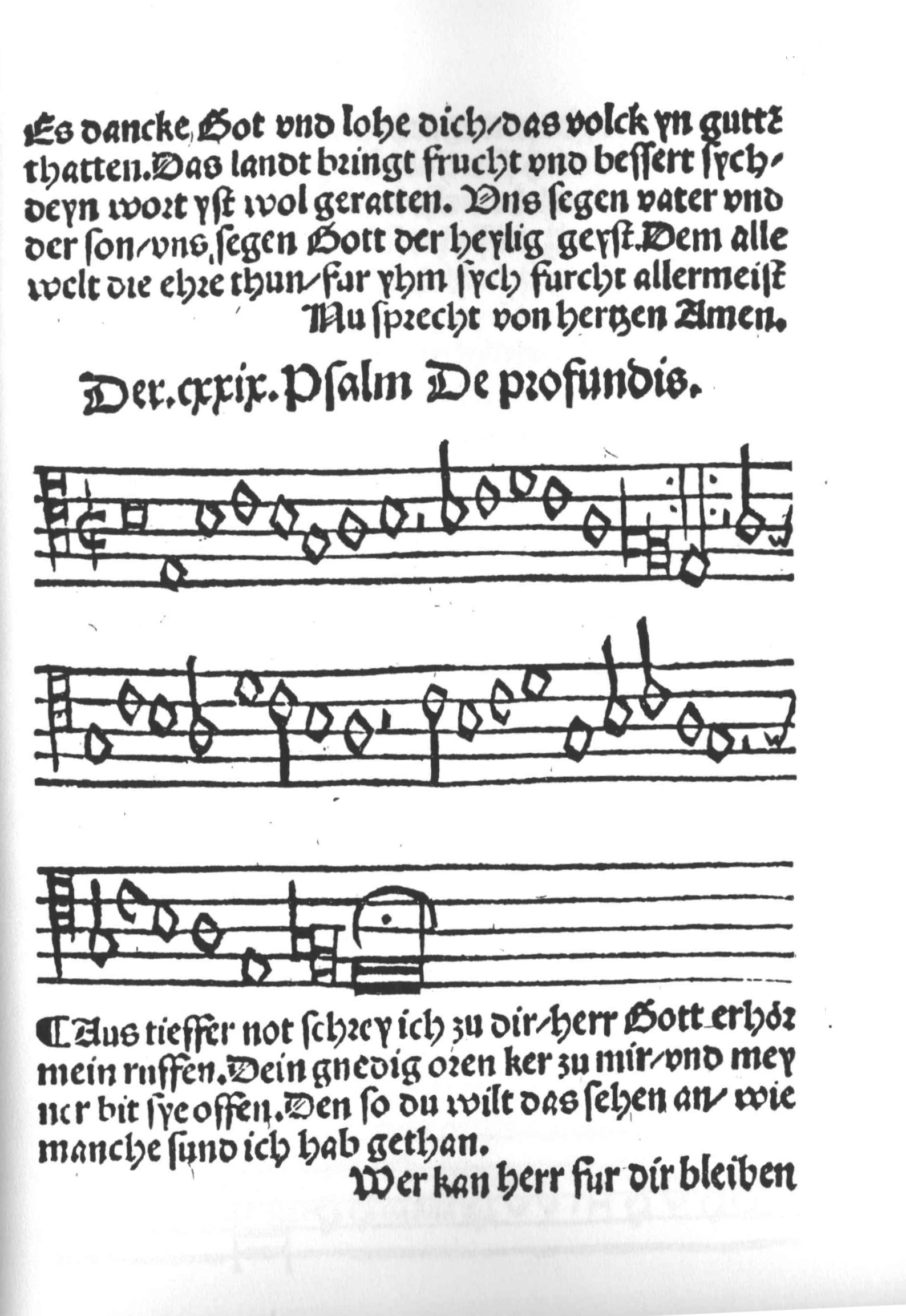
- Luther's hymn, the basis for the cantata, in a 1524 print
- Occasion: 21st Sunday after Trinity
- Chorale: "Aus tiefer Not schrei ich zu dir" by Martin Luther
- Performed: 29 October 1724: Leipzig
- Vocal: SATB choir and solo
- Instrumental: 4 trombones; 2 oboes; strings; continuo

Aus tiefer Not schrei ich zu dir (Out of deep anguish I call to You), BWV 38, is a church cantata by Johann Sebastian Bach, composed in Leipzig in 1724 for the 21st Sunday after Trinity and first performed on 29 October 1724. It is based on Martin Luther's penitential hymn "Aus tiefer Not schrei ich zu dir", a paraphrase of Psalm 130.

The cantata is part of Bach's chorale cantata cycle, which focused on Lutheran hymns. Luther's first and last stanza were retained unchanged: the former set as a chorale fantasia, the latter as a four-part closing chorale. An unknown librettist paraphrased the three inner stanzas as two sets of recitative and aria. Bach scored the cantata for four vocal soloists, a four-part choir, and a Baroque instrumental ensemble of four trombones, two oboes, strings and continuo. The cantata is unusual in its use of the chorale tune not only in the outer movements, but as material for motifs in recitative and aria, once even taking the chorale melody as a continuo line. In keeping with the spirit of the 200-year-old hymn, which paraphrases the Old Testament, Bach used motet style in the outer movements, with all instruments, especially the four trombones, enforcing the vocal lines.

== History and text ==
Bach composed this chorale cantata in Leipzig in 1724. Written for the 21st Sunday after Trinity, it was part of his second annual cycle of cantatas which was planned as a cycle of chorale cantatas, based on prominent Lutheran hymns, for all occasions of the liturgical year.

The prescribed readings for the Sunday were from Paul's Epistle to the Ephesians, "take unto you the whole armour of God", and from the Gospel of John, the healing of the nobleman's son.

The cantata is based on Martin Luther's "Aus tiefer Not schrei ich zu dir", a paraphrase of Psalm 130. It was in Bach's time the "required hymn" for the Sunday. Luther wrote about the psalm that it was coming from a

truly penitent heart that is most deeply moved in its distress. We are all in deep and great misery, but we do not feel our condition. Crying is nothing but a strong and earnest longing for God's grace, which does not arise in a person unless he sees in what depth he is lying.

The text of the chorale is unchanged for the first and last movements. An unknown poet paraphrased the other three stanzas of the chorale for movements 2 to 5. In a recitative which Bach set for soprano, the librettist added to Luther's text what Hofmann called "essentially a free extension of its ideological content".

Bach led the Thomanerchor in the first performance of the cantata on 29 October 1724.

== Music ==
=== Structure and scoring ===
Bach structured the cantata in six movements. The text and tune of the hymn are retained in the outer choral movements, a chorale fantasia and a four-part closing chorale, which frame two sets of recitative and aria. Bach scored the work for four vocal soloists (soprano, alto, tenor, bass), a four-part choir, and a Baroque instrumental ensemble of four trombones (Tb), two oboes (Ob), two violins (Vl), viola (Va) and basso continuo. This is one of three Bach cantatas to use four different trombone parts (soprano, alto, tenor, and bass), the others being Ach Gott, vom Himmel sieh darein, BWV 2 and Ich hatte viel Bekümmernis, BWV 21. The instruments play colla parte with the voices in the outer movements in the style of Bach's motets.

In the following table of the movements, the scoring follows the Neue Bach-Ausgabe. The keys and time signatures are taken from Alfred Dürr's standard work Die Kantaten von Johann Sebastian Bach, using the symbol for common time (4/4). The continuo, playing throughout, is not shown.

Movements of Aus tiefer Not schrei ich zu dir
No.	Title	Text	Type	Vocal	Winds	Strings	Key	Time
1	Aus tiefer Not schrei ich zu dir	Luther	chorale fantasia	SATB	4Tb 2Ob	2Vl Va	E (Phrygian)	common time
2	In Jesu Gnade wird allein	anon	recitative	A				common time
3	Ich höre mitten in den Leiden	anon	aria	T	2Ob		A minor	common time
4	Ach! Daß mein Glaube noch so schwach	anon	recitative	S				common time
5	Wenn meine Trübsal als mit Ketten	anon	aria	S A B			D minor	common time
6	Ob bei uns ist der Sünden viel	Luther	chorale	SATB	4Tb 2Ob	2Vl Va	E (Phrygian)	common time

=== Movements ===
In this cantata, Bach used the chorale melody not only in the opening chorale fantasia and the closing chorale, but also in the inner movements. He built an aria theme from parts of the melody, as in movement 3, used the melody as a continuo line (movement 4), and took motifs from the melody. The American musicologist Eric Chafe suggests that the entire cantata is also based on a "design" that descends tonally for the first five movements and rises again in the closing chorale, exploiting the textual theme of "destruction followed by restoration".

==== 1 ====
The opening movement is a chorale fantasia, "Aus tiefer Not schrei ich zu dir" (Out of deep anguish I call to You), on the hymn tune in Phrygian mode. It combines the structure of a motet with chromatic and dissonant harmonies. As in his motets and the chorale cantata Ach Gott, vom Himmel sieh darein, BWV 2, Bach uses the old style of scoring, with all instruments doubling the vocal parts. The Bach scholar Klaus Hofmann notes that Bach's use of older musical style may reflect Bach pointing back at the source, Luther's paraphrase of a text from the Old Testament. The lower voices begin each line with imitation on the melody to come, which is then presented in long notes by the soprano as a cantus firmus. The musicologist Julian Mincham interpreted the imitative counterpoint as a "portrayal of the individual cries of distress which coalesce to form a combined human clamour". John Eliot Gardiner, who conducted the Bach Cantata Pilgrimage in 2000, compared the style to both Heinrich Schütz and Anton Bruckner, observing that although using the means of older masters, Bach "push[es] the frontiers of this motet movement almost out of stylistic reach through abrupt chromatic twists to this tune in Phrygian mode."

==== 2 ====
Like the fantasia, the alto recitative "In Jesu Gnade wird allein" (In Jesus' grace alone), is stylistically archaic. The Bach scholar Alfred Dürr describes the secco recitative as "plain but forcefully declaimed". Mincham noted that its "semi-chaotic" form may reflect the tumult of evil and sin: the movement maintains an "archaic modal feel" but with a continuo line that "seems to lack the coherence one normally expects from a Bach bass".

==== 3 ====
The tenor aria, "Ich höre mitten in den Leiden" (I hear, in the midst of my sorrows), is expressive with a prominent syncopated rhythmic motif which runs throughout the movement. The tenor line is part of a four-part texture with the oboes and continuo. The oboes play "continuously interwoven chromatic lines".

Luther intended the contrasting ideas of the psalm to represent "contradictory and disharmonious things, for hope and despair are opposites", and wrote in his song that we must "hope in despair", because "hope which forms the new man, grows in the midst of fear that cuts down the old Adam".

==== 4 ====
A soprano recitative, "Ach! Daß mein Glaube noch so schwach" (Alas! that my faith is yet so weak), adopts a modified version of the chorale melody as the continuo line. Gardiner noted the "uncompromising" way of changing the normal order: the soprano, usually singing a chorale cantus firmus (firm song) to the continuo, expresses weakness and insecurity here, marked "a battuta", while the firm foundation is the chorale in the bass, to which the text of stanza three, "Darum auf Gott will hoffen ich" (Therefore I will hope in God), could be imagined. Gardiner pointed out a detail: the word "Zeichen" (sign) "is given expressive, symbolic expression, a diminished seventh chord assigned to that word … formed by all three 'signs", one sharp (F♯), one flat (E♭) and one natural (C). As Eric Chafe concludes,

since St John's Gospel is known as the Book of Signs, and since the tonal plan of Bach's St John Passion appears to have been conceived as a form of play on the three musical signs (ie sharp, flat and natural key areas) this important detail in the plan of Aus tiefer Not perhaps possesses a wider significance, relating it to Bach's tonal-allegorical procedures in general.

==== 5 ====
The trio aria, "Wenn meine Trübsal als mit Ketten" (When my troubles like chains), is comparable to a trio movement of the cantata Du Friedefürst, Herr Jesu Christ, BWV 116, composed three weeks earlier, then expressing "Ach, wir bekennen unsre Schuld" (Alas, we confess our sins). This is one of only three trios in this cantata cycle.

In this movement, "despair, like chains, fetters one misfortune to the next" is contrasted to "shall my Saviour free me suddenly from it all", presented as akin to morning following night. Bach expresses despair by a descending sequential ritornello based on the circle of fifths through the minor keys (D, G, C, F), finally reaching B♭ major), whereas the "dawning of faith" is illustrated with an upward motion. Mincham characterized the ritornello as "comfortably conventional", in contrast with the "convoluted" theme. Hofmann noted the "operatic quality" of the movement, when for example on the words "daß alles plötzlich von mir fällt" (so that everything suddenly releases me), the polyphony suddenly resolves to homophony.

==== 6 ====
The four-part setting of the closing chorale, "Ob bei uns ist der Sünden viel" (Although the sins among us are many), begins with a dissonant chord, interpreted by Hofmann as a last cry of anguish "in an almost 'Romantic' manner". Gardiner commented: "With all the voices given full orchestral doubling (again, those four trombones!), this chorale is impressive, terrifying in its Lutheran zeal". Mincham noted the setting's "enigmatic" final cadence which "leaves us with a sense that the human condition is ongoing".

== Publication ==
The first critical edition of the piece was published in 1857, along with some other cantatas, in the Bach-Gesellschaft Ausgabe. The editor of the volume was Wilhelm Rust. The piece also appeared in the Neue Bach-Ausgabe, edited by Ulrich Bartels, in 1997.

== Recordings ==
Title	Conductor	Ensemble(s)	Soloists	Label	Year
J. S. Bach: Das Kantatenwerk • Complete Cantatas • Les Cantates, Folge / Vol. 10 - BWV 35–38	Nikolaus Harnoncourt	Wiener Sängerknaben; Chorus Viennensis; Concentus Musicus Wien	Soloist of the Wiener Sängerknaben; Paul Esswood; Kurt Equiluz; Ruud van der Meer	Teldec	1974
Bach Cantatas Vol. 5 – Sundays after Trinity II	Karl Richter	Münchener Bach-Chor; Münchener Bach-Orchester	Edith Mathis; Trudeliese Schmidt; Peter Schreier; Dietrich Fischer-Dieskau	Archiv Produktion	1978
Die Bach Kantate Vol. 56	Helmuth Rilling	Gächinger Kantorei; Bach-Collegium Stuttgart	Arleen Augér; Helen Watts; Lutz-Michael Harder; Philippe Huttenlocher	Hänssler	1980
Bach Edition Vol. 18 – Cantatas Vol. 9	Pieter Jan Leusink	Holland Boys Choir; Netherlands Bach Collegium	Ruth Holton; Sytse Buwalda; Nico van der Meel; Bas Ramselaar	Brilliant Classics	2000
Bach Cantatas Vol. 11: Genova/Greenwich	John Eliot Gardiner	Monteverdi Choir; English Baroque Soloists	Joanne Lunn; William Towers; Paul Agnew; Gotthold Schwarz	Soli Deo Gloria	2000
J. S. Bach: Complete Cantatas Vol. 13	Ton Koopman	Amsterdam Baroque Orchestra & Choir	Deborah York; Franziska Gottwald; Paul Agnew; Klaus Mertens	Antoine Marchand	2000
J. S. Bach: Cantatas Vol. 29 – Cantatas from Leipzig 1724	Masaaki Suzuki	Bach Collegium Japan; Concerto Palatino	Dorothee Mields; Pascal Bertin; Gerd Türk; Peter Kooy	BIS	2004
