= First Lutheran hymnal =

Hymnal by Martin Luther and Paul Speratus

Achtliederbuch (First Lutheran hymnal)
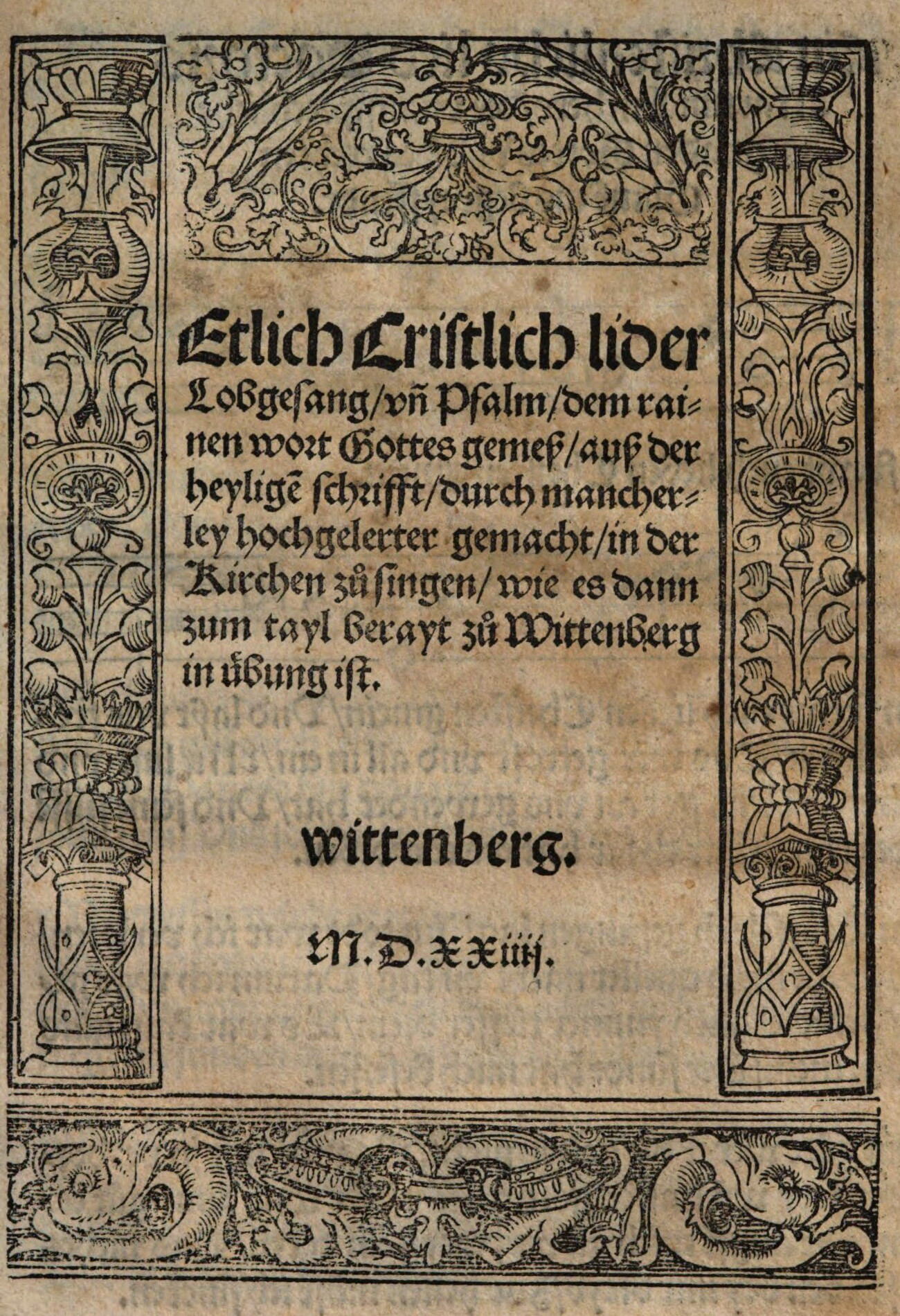
- Title page of the first Lutheran hymnal of eight hymns (songs)
- Language: German
- Genre: Hymnal
- Published: 1524
- Publisher: Martin Luther; Paul Speratus

The First Lutheran hymnal, published in 1524 as Etlich Cristlich lider / Lobgesang und Psalm (Some Christian songs / canticle, and psalm), often also often referred to as the Achtliederbuch (Book with eight songs, literally Eightsongsbook), was the first Lutheran hymnal.

== History and content ==
The hymnal was created by Martin Luther and Paul Speratus working in collaboration. It contains eight hymns: four by Luther, three by Speratus, and one anonymous, which has been attributed to Justus Jonas. The creators declared their intentions on the title page: "Lobgesang / un Psalm / dem rainen wort Gottes gemeß / auß der heylige schrifft / durch mancherley hochgelerter gemacht / in der Kirch zu singen / wie es dann zum tayl Berayt in Wittenberg in übung ist." (Canticle / and psalm / according to the pure word of God / from the holy scripture / made by several learned [people] / to be sung in church / as already practised in part in Wittenberg.)

The hymnal is rather "eine lose buchhändlerische Zusammenfassung", a loose collection of songs which existed as broadsheets, than a hymnal with a concept. It was printed around the turn of the year 1523/1524 in Nuremberg by Jobst Gutknecht. The title page showed Wittenberg as the location of print. The booklet of twelve pages contained eight songs on five different melodies.

The little hymnal was distributed in Europe. Luther's adversaries complained that "the whole people are singing themselves into his doctrines." Because of the great demand, another collection was published the same year, the Erfurt Enchiridion, containing 26 hymns, 18 of them by Luther.

== Songs ==
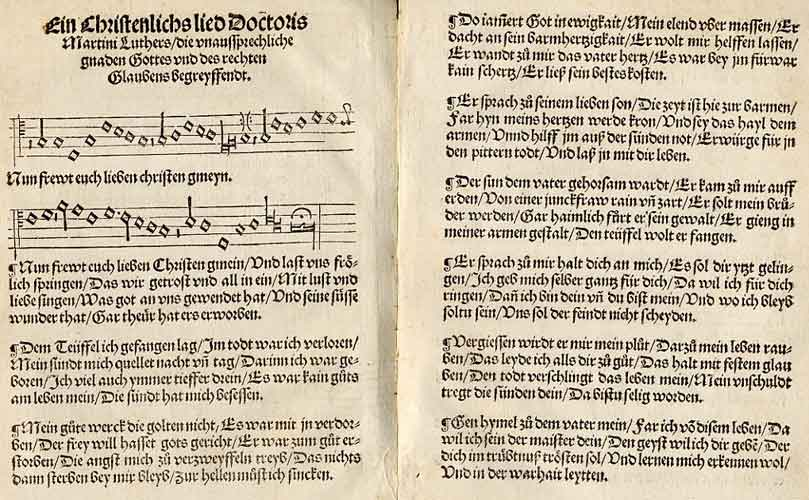
"Nun frewt euch, lieben Christen gmein"

1. Nun freut euch, lieben Christen g'mein (Luther)
2. Es ist das Heil uns kommen her (Speratus)
3. In Gott gelaub ich, das er hat (Speratus) (German Wikisource page)
4. Hilf Gott, wie ist der Menschen Not (Speratus)
5. Ach Gott, vom Himmel sieh darein (Luther)
6. Es spricht der Unweisen Mund wohl (Luther)
7. Aus tiefer Not schrei ich zu dir (Luther)
8. In Jesu Namen wir heben an (anonymous, setting for two voices)

== See also ==
- List of hymns by Martin Luther
- Metrical psalter

Lutheran

- Erfurt Enchiridion
- Eyn geystlich Gesangk Buchleyn
- Swenske songer eller wisor 1536
- Thomissøn's hymnal

Anabaptist

- Ausbund

Anglican

- Book of Common Prayer
- Whole Book of Psalms

Presbyterian

- Book of Common Order
- Scottish Psalter

Reformed

- Souterliedekens
- Genevan Psalter

== Sources ==
- Konrad Ameln (ed.): Das Achtliederbuch, facsimile Nürnberg, 1523/24, Jahrbuch für Liturgik und Hymnologie 2, 1956 (in German)
- From The “Eight Songs,” Wittenberg, 1524. With English Translations and Music, as part of the Online Library of Liberty: A collection of scholarly works about individual liberty and free markets.
