= Johannes Loersfeld =

- Known for: Printing

Johannes Loersfeld (fl. 1525–1528) was a German printer at Erfurt in the Archbishopric of Mayence.

Among his significant editions was the Erfurt Enchiridion, an early Lutheran hymn-book. Loersfeld's edition of 1524 appeared at much the same time as that of his rival Matthes Maler but was probably the first of this work.
