= Aus tiefer Not schrei ich zu dir =

1524 Lutheran hymn

- Hymn by Martin Luther
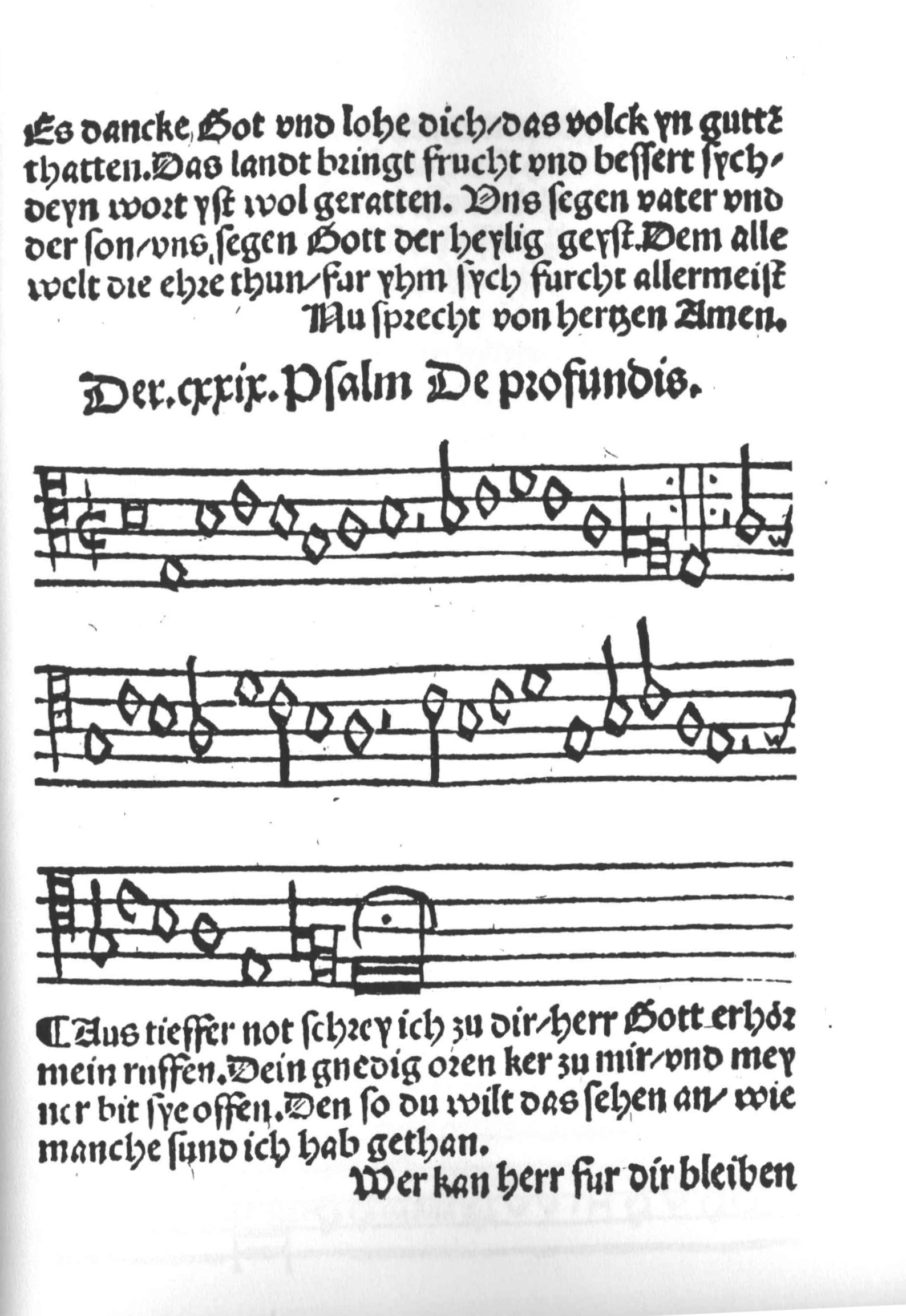
- "Aus tieffer not schrey ich zu dir" in the Erfurt Enchiridion, 1524
- English: From deep affliction I cry out to you
- Catalogue: Zahn 4437–4438
- Text: by Martin Luther
- Language: German
- Published: 1524
- An organ version of the hymn

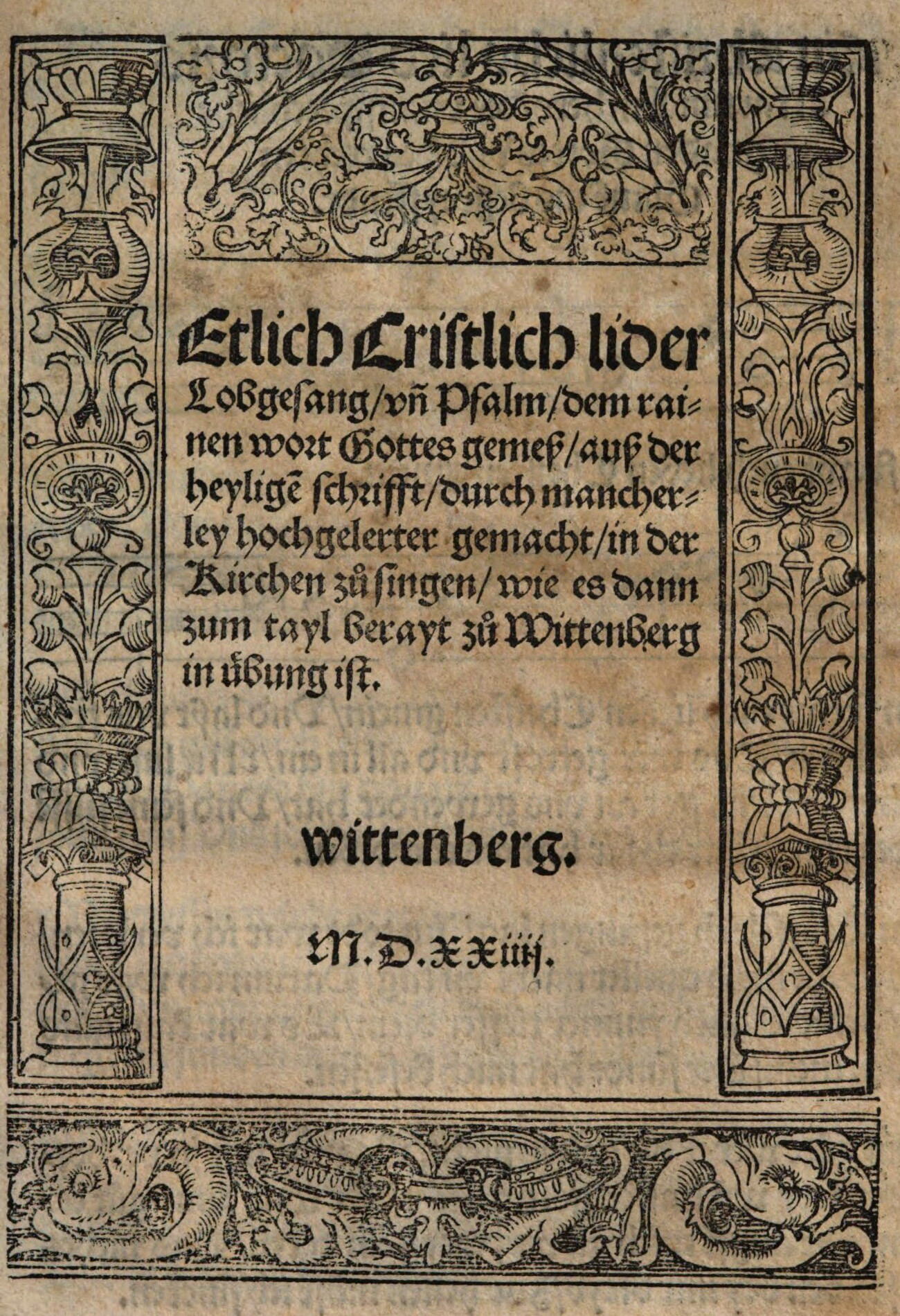
Etlich Cristlich lider, title page of the Achtliederbuch, 1524

"Aus tiefer Not schrei ich zu dir" (From deep affliction I cry out to you), originally "Aus tieffer not schrey ich zu dir", later also "Aus tiefer Noth schrei' ich zu dir", is a Lutheran hymn of 1524. Its lyrics were written by Martin Luther as a paraphrase of Psalm 130. It was first published in 1524 as one of eight songs in the first Lutheran hymnal, the Achtliederbuch, which contained four songs by Luther, three by Paul Speratus, and one by Justus Jonas, and also appeared the same year in the Erfurt Enchiridion. It is part of many hymnals, also in translations. The text inspired vocal and organ music from the Renaissance to contemporary, including composers such as Johann Sebastian Bach, who based a chorale cantata on it, Felix Mendelssohn and Max Reger.

== History and text ==
Luther paraphrased Psalm 130 as his first attempt to make the psalms accessible to Protestant church services in German. He transformed, likely in 1523, the Latin penitential psalm De profundis into a hymn. Luther sent it as a sample to encourage Protestant colleagues to write psalm-hymns for use in German worship. A version in four stanzas first appeared in 1524 in Nuremberg in Etlich Cristlich lider (Some Christian songs), also called Achtliederbuch, the first Lutheran hymnal. The same year it appeared in Erfurt in Eyn Enchiridion. A version in five stanzas, with the ideas of stanza 2 as two stanzas developing the theme of "grace alone" more fully, was first published in 1524 in Wittenberg in Eyn geystlich Gesangk Buchleyn. Scholars debate if the shorter version is actually Luther's, or reduced by an editor from the longer version.

The version in five stanzas, expressing essential Reformation doctrine, was designated as a regular component of several regional Lutheran liturgies. It was widely used at funerals, including Luther's own on 20 February 1546 in Halle. Along with Erhart Hegenwalt's hymnic version of Psalm 51, Luther's hymn was also adopted for use with the fifth part of Luther's Small Catechism, concerning confession.

== Tune and hymnals ==
The chorale appeared first in the Achtliederbuch, supposed to be sung to the melody of "Es ist das Heil uns kommen her". In one of the Erfurt Enchiridia it is associated with the melody of Ach Gott, vom Himmel sieh darein".

Since, the text has been associated with two further tunes. The tune (Zahn No. 4437) appeared in Eyn geystlich Gesangk Buchleyn, a collection by Johann Walter, prepared with the collaboration of Luther. In the collection the hymn appears as a paraphrase of Psalm 130.

The second melody, Zahn No. 4438, probably existed in the 15th century and was modified by Wolfgang Dachstein, published in Teütsch Kirchen amt (Part 1) Straßburg in 1524. The chorale is part of many hymnals, also in translations such as Out of the depths I cry to Thee by Catherine Winkworth in 1861 and Isaac Stolzfus in 1998.

== Musical settings ==
=== Organ settings ===
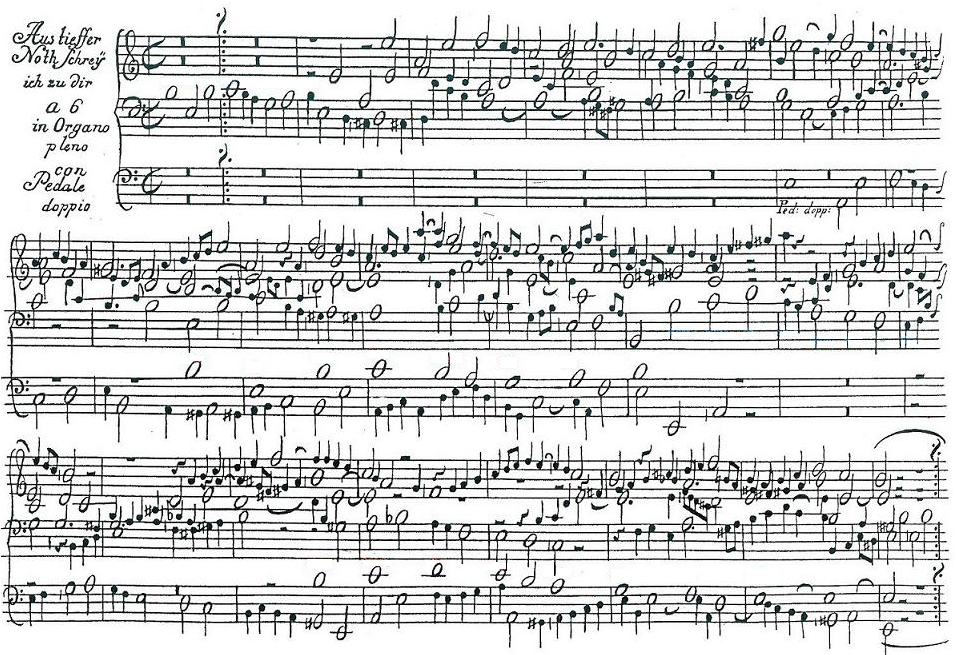
First page of Bach's original print of BWV 686 from his Clavier-Übung III

Hans Kotter (c. 1480 – 1541) composed the "earliest extant organ setting of a Protestant chorale", an intabulation. 17th-century chorale preludes include works by Johann Pachelbel, Johann Heinrich Scheidemann, Friedrich Wilhelm Zachow and Christian Geist.

Johann Sebastian Bach set the chorale preludes twice in his Clavier-Übung III, in BWV 686 and BWV 687, the first with six voices, including a double pedal with the cantus firmus in the tenor voice at half the speed ("augmentation"). In 1873 Philipp Spitta singled out the chorale prelude BWV 686 as follows: "It is significant of Bach's manner of feeling that he should choose this chorale for the crowning point of his work. For it cannot be questioned that this chorale is its crowning point, from the ingenuity of the part-writing, the wealth and nobility of the harmonies, and the executive power which it requires.".

Amongst 19th-century composers, Felix Mendelssohn based the third of his Organ Sonatas, Op. 65, on the chorale Franz Liszt wrote a setting for organ and harmonium based on BWV 38.

In the 20th century, Max Reger composed a chorale prelude as No. 3 of his 52 Chorale Preludes, Op. 67 in 1902. Waldemar von Baußnern wrote a chorale fantasia in 1912. In 1965 Jürg Baur composed a Chorale Partita for organ on the hymn Aus tiefer Not. In 1978 the Dutch composer Henk Badings also wrote an organ prelude based on the hymn.

=== Vocal settings ===
Melchior Franck composed an expressive four-part setting. Michael Praetorius arranged the chorale for eight voices, one of the 1200 arrangements of Lutheran chorales in his Musae Sioniae. Johann Sebastian Bach used the complete chorale as the base for his chorale cantata Aus tiefer Not schrei ich zu dir, BWV 38, composed in Leipzig for the 21st Sunday after Trinity on 19 October 1724. Georg Friedrich Handel quoted the characteristic intervals from the beginning of the chorale's first tune several times at the end of the last aria of his oratorio Messiah, If God be for us, leading into the final chorus Worthy is the Lamb. Felix Mendelssohn composed a setting of this text for soloists, 4-part chorus and organ/ensemble as the first movement of his Op. 23 'Kirchenmusik'
