= Paul Speratus =

Swabian Catholic priest

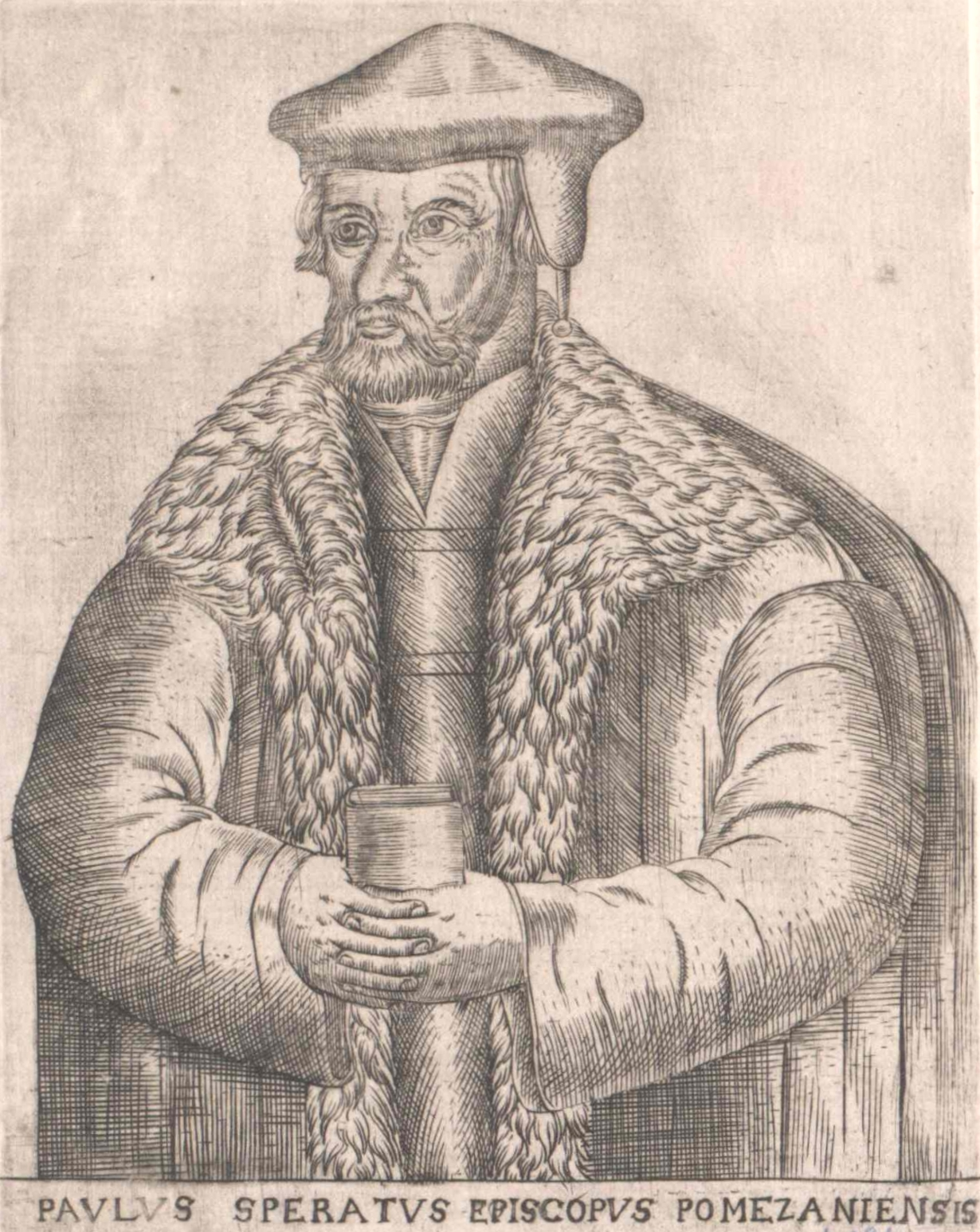
- Born: 13 December 1484; Rötlen, Holy Roman Empire
- Died: 12 August 1551 (aged 66); Marienwerder, Kingdom of Poland
- Occupations: Lutheran cleric; Hymn writer
- Works: First Lutheran hymnal

Paul Speratus (13 December 1484 – 12 August 1551) was a Swabian Catholic priest who became a Lutheran preacher, reformer and hymn-writer. In 1523, he helped Martin Luther to create the First Lutheran hymnal, published in 1524 and called Achtliederbuch.

== Early life ==
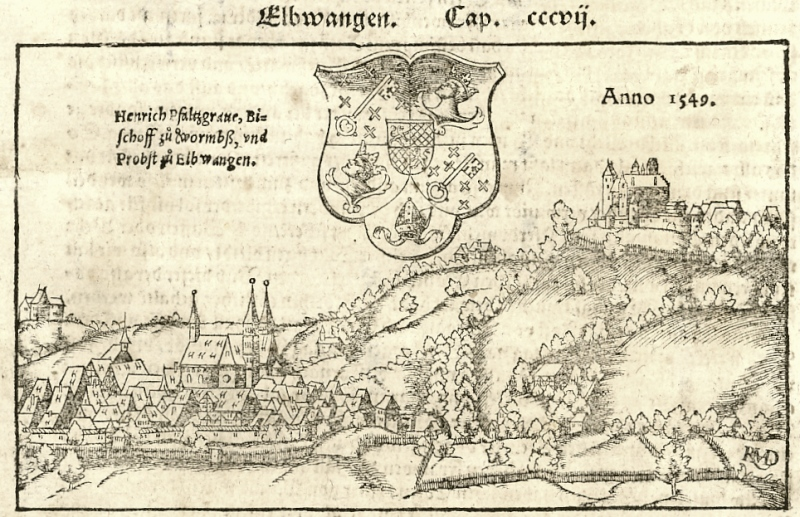
Ellwangen 1549

Paul Speratus was born in Rötlen (a village now part of present-day Ellwangen) in Swabia, on or about 13 December 1484, probably to a wealthy family. His original surname, Latinized to "Speratus", may have been "Spreter", "Hoffer", or "Offer". In later years would write his name as "von Rötlen" (of Rötlen) or "von Ellwangen, Priester der Diöcese Augsburg" (of Ellwangen, Priest of the Diocese of Augsburg).

Early studies took him to Paris and Italy, as well as (probably) Freiburg and Vienna. In 1506, he was ordained a Roman Catholic priest. In 1517, he was the author of a poem praising the Johann Eck, a conservative Catholic soon to be an important Catholic critic of Luther's teaching. At about the same time, the Pope named Speratus a Papal count palatine. In 1520, after having spent some years as cathedral preacher in Salzburg, he became the cathedral preacher in Würzburg.

== Disciple of Martin Luther ==
On 31 October 1517, Martin Luther wrote to his bishop, Albert of Mainz, protesting the sale of indulgences and enclosing a copy of his 95 Theses, which his friends had translated from Latin to German by January 1518. In the early part of his ministry, Luther saw himself as a reformer operating inside the Catholic Church, as did many early followers such as Speratus.

By November 1521, however, Speratus had married and was forced to flee his position, going first to Salzburg, and then to Moravia. He was excommunicated in 1522, after preaching in Vienna a sermon denouncing his monastic vows. In 1523, he was imprisoned and condemned to death by burning, being released only after the intervention of friends and on the condition that he leave Moravia. It was while imprisoned that Speratus wrote his most famous hymn, Es ist das Heil uns kommen her.

== Achtliederbuch ==
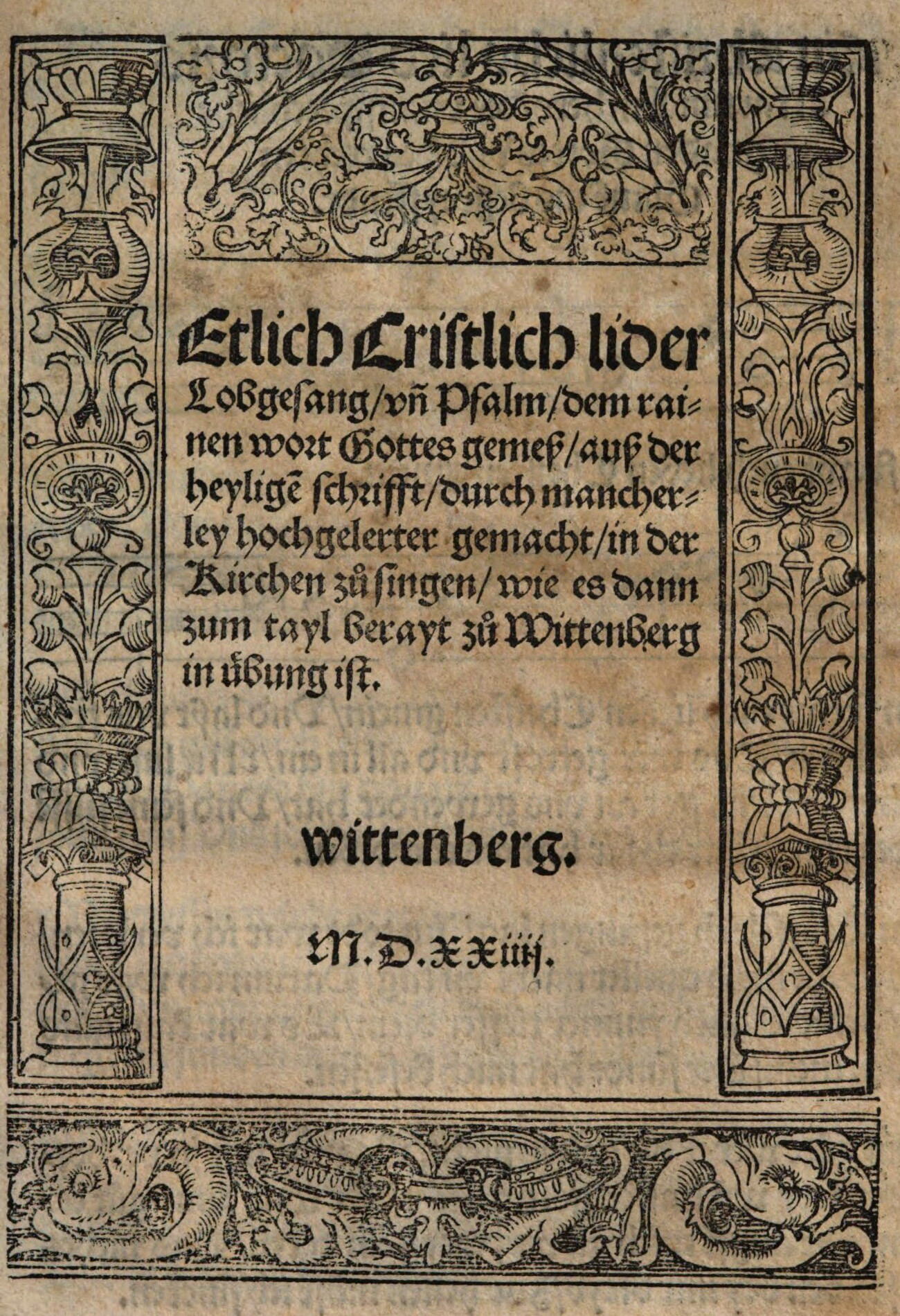
Title page of the Achtliederbuch

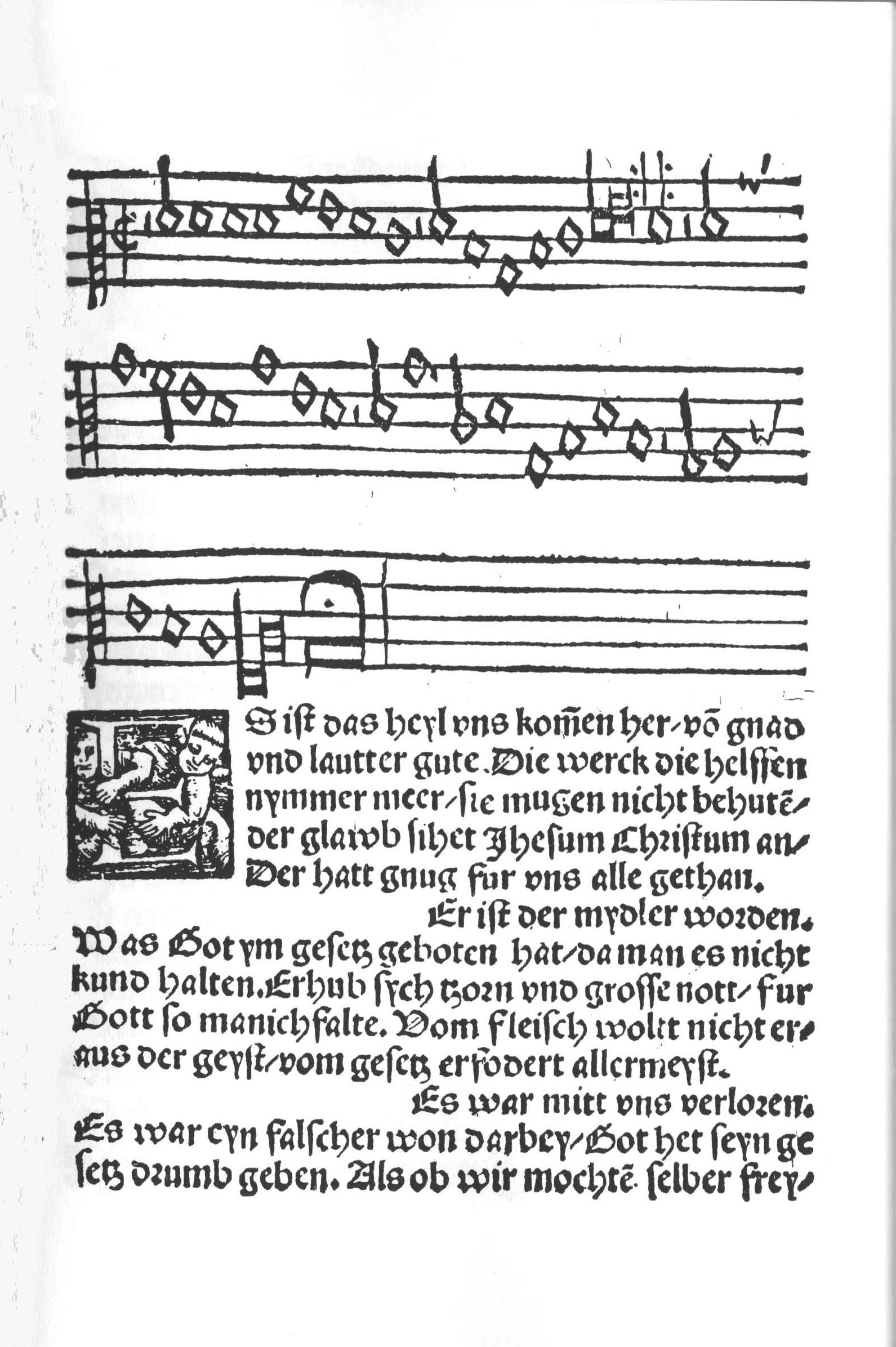
"Es ist das heyl vns kommen her", 1524

After Speratus was released from prison, he and his wife went to join Luther in Wittenberg in 1523, where Speratus helped Luther to create the first Lutheran hymnal, the Achtliederbuch, published in 1524. This hymnal contained only eight songs: four by Luther, three by Speratus, and one by Justus Jonas. All its songs were published the same year in the Erfurt Enchiridion, a collection of 26 hymns.

=== Es ist das Heil uns kommen her ===
The words of this hymn were written during the time Speratus was imprisoned; the melody is taken from a 15th-century chorale. According to Catherine Winkworth, "Luther himself is said to have given his last coin to a Prussian beggar from whom he heard it for the first time."

The 14 stanzas of Speratus's text expound Luther's teaching concerning salvation by faith rather than by doing good works. According to Scott Hendrix, "It not only emphasizes justification by faith alone but it also underlines the vitality of that faith manifested in service to others".

=== In Gott gelaub ich, daß er hat ===
Miles Coverdale published his English translation of this song as "In God I trust for so I must".

=== Hilf Gott, wie ist der Menschen Not ===
This hymn is recommended in the Missal of Matthäus Ludecus (1589) for several different feasts of the liturgical year including Septuagesima.

== Later career ==
On Luther's recommendation, Speratus became court chaplain of Albert, Duke of Prussia, a post he held from 1524 to 1529. In 1530, he became the Lutheran bishop of Pomesania, a post he held until his death in 1551. He was active there in defending the tenets of faith advanced by Luther, and in attacking such rival sects as the followers of Caspar Schwenckfeldt and Andreas Osiander. He died in Marienwerder on 12 August 1551.
