= Souterliedekens =

The Souterliedekens (literal: Psalter-songs) is a Dutch metrical psalter, published in 1540 in Antwerp, and which remained very popular throughout the century. The metrical rhyming psalms were, probably, arranged by a Utrecht nobleman: Willem van Zuylen van Nijevelt (d. 1543). For the melodies he used folksongs from the Low Countries (though some have German or French origin). This publication has great value, because the publisher (Symon Cock) not only added the phrase 'sung to the tune of...' but also provided the actual music (melody) with the texts. It also was the first psalter in a European language.

Nowadays many of the folksong melodies that were known at that time can be reconstructed only because they have survived in the "Souterliedekens". Composers like Jacobus Clemens non Papa, Gerardus Mes, and Cornelis Boscoop made polyphonic settings based on the melody of the monophonic "Souterliedekens". The melody often functions as a cantus firmus. The Antwerp printer Tielman Susato dedicated four volumes of his music-books ("Musyck Boexkens") to Clemens' "Souterliedekens" (vol. IV to VII).
