= Thomas Sternhold =

Member of the Parliament of England

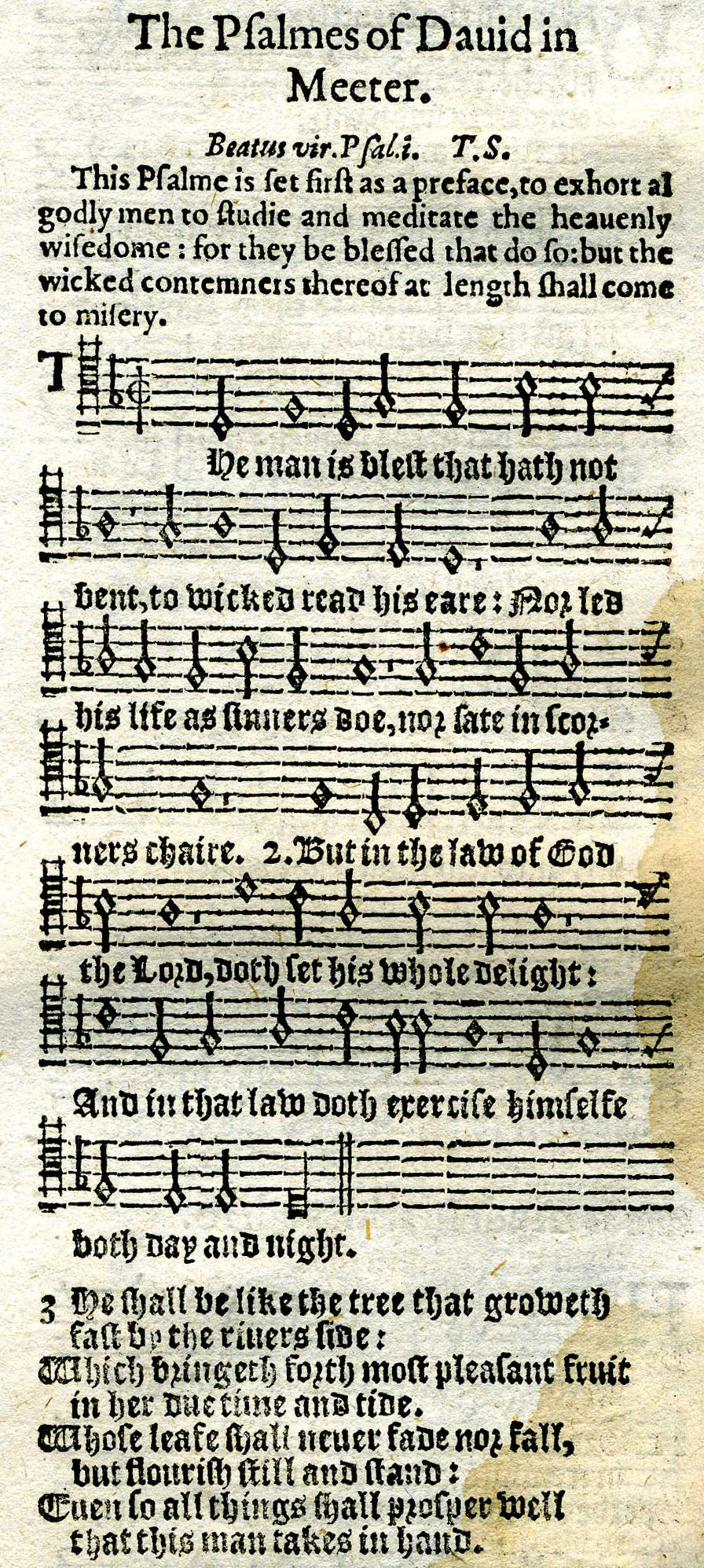
Psalm 1 in 1628 printing with tune, metrical version by Thomas Sternhold.

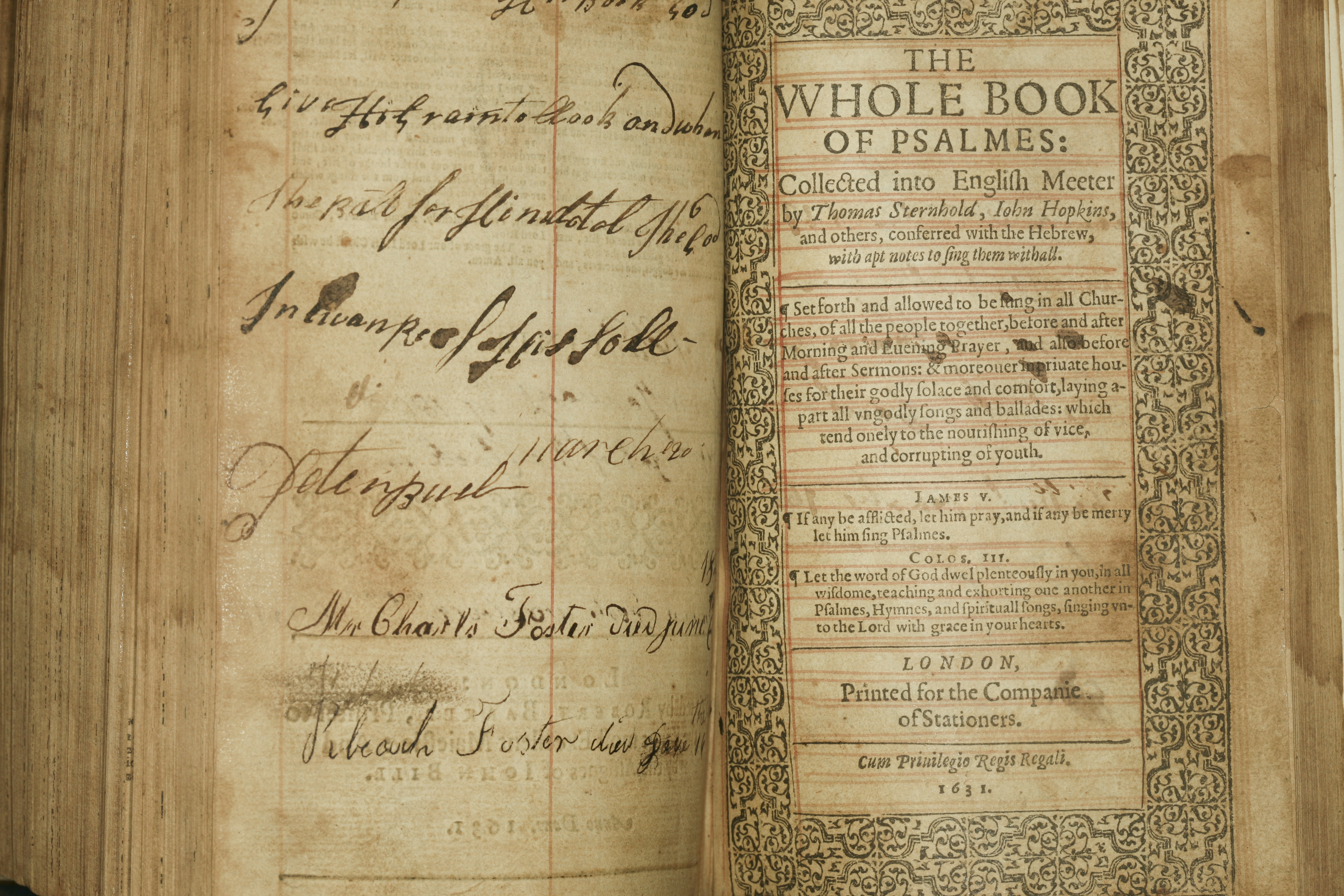
The Whole Book of Psalmes

Thomas Sternhold (1500–1549) was an English courtier and the principal author of the first English metrical version of the Psalms, originally attached to the Prayer-Book as augmented by John Hopkins.

== Life ==
Anthony Wood says that Sternhold entered Christ Church, Oxford, but did not take a degree. The first definite date in his life is 1538, when the name of Thomas Sternhold appears in Thomas Cromwell's accounts. He became one of the grooms of the robes to Henry VIII, and was a favourite, to whom a legacy of a hundred marks was bequeathed him by the king's will. He may have been the Thomas Sternell or Sternoll who was elected for Plymouth to the parliament that met on 30 January 1545, and was dissolved by Henry VIII's death in January 1547.

Sternhold was born in Blakeney, Gloucestershire, and died on 23 August 1549. His will, dated August 1549, was proved on 12 September following. Among the witnesses to his will was Edward Whitchurch, probably his publisher. His property consisted of land in Hampshire and at Bodmin in Cornwall. Part of the Hampshire property might have been inherited. Slackstead, however, had been purchased recently, as it had been granted, as part of the possessions of Hyde Abbey, to Sir Ralph Sadler in 1547. The Bodmin property also he had purchased from the crown in 1543, as part of the possessions of the dissolved priory of St. Petrock there.

== Psalm translations ==
His earliest metrical versions of the Psalms may have been composed in Henry's reign; Miles Coverdale had published his "Goostly Psalmes", a translation of Luther's psalm versions, as early as 1535. In 1540 the earliest Psalms by Marot, valet de chambre to Francis I, were known at the French court, and soon afterwards passed into Protestant worship at Geneva. Sternhold, Marot, and Coverdale all wished to substitute the Psalms of David for the ballads of the court and people.

Sternhold (with the exception of Psalm cxx) used only one metre, and this the simplest of all ballad measures, the metre of Chevy Chace. This choice of metre became the predominant metre (common metre) not only of the old and new versions of England and Scotland, but of other metrical psalters and English hymns in general. Sternhold is said to have sung his psalms to his organ for his own solace. (Strype). The only edition which Sternhold lived to publish he dedicated to the young king Edward VI. In this dedication he expresses a hope of "travayling further", and "performing the residue" of the Psalter; but his total contribution to the old version consists of only forty psalms.

Sternhold is remembered as the originator of the first metrical version of the Psalms which obtained general currency alike in England and Scotland. The Versification of Certain Chapters of the Proverbs of Solomon has been attributed to him in error. Sternhold and Hopkins's version has had a larger circulation than any work in the language, except the authorised version of the Bible and the Book of Common Prayer. Sternhold's work forms its base. His first edition undated, but, as being dedicated to Edward VI, not earlier than 1547, contains nineteen psalms (i–v, xx, xxv, xxviii, xxix, xxxii, xxxiv, xli, xlix, lxxiii, lxxviii, ciii, cxx, cxxiii, cxxviii). It was printed by Edward Whitchurch, and is entitled Certayne Psalmes chosē out of the Psalter of Dauid and drawē into Englishē Metre by Thomas Sternhold, grome of ye Kynges Maiesties Roobes (Brit. Museum). The second edition, which was printed after his death (apparently by John Hopkins, who adds seven psalms of his own in order to fill in a blank space) added to those of the former edition eighteen new psalms (vi–xvii, xix, xxi, xliii, xliv, lxiii, lxviii). It is entitled Al such Psalmes of Dauid as Thomas Sternhold, late grome of the Kinges maiesties robes, did in his lyfetime drawe into English Metre, and was printed by Edward Whitchurche in 1549 (Cambridge University Library). Three more psalms (xviii, xxii, xxiii) are added to these in a rare edition of the growing Psalter printed by John Daye in 1561, and the complete number (40) appears in the full editions of 1562, 1563, and all subsequent ones. The only one of his psalms which remains current is the simple rendering of Psalm xxiii (My Shepherd is the Living Lord). The text of his psalms, as found in all editions after 1556, follows the Genevan revision of that year.

The Sternhold-Hopkins psalter continued in general use till Nahum Tate and Nicholas Brady's New Version of the Psalms of David of 1696 was substituted in 1717.

== See also ==
- Metrical psalter
