= Mit Fried und Freud ich fahr dahin, BWV 125 =

Chorale cantata by Johann Sebastian Bach

Mit Fried und Freud ich fahr dahin
- BWV 125
- Chorale cantata by J. S. Bach
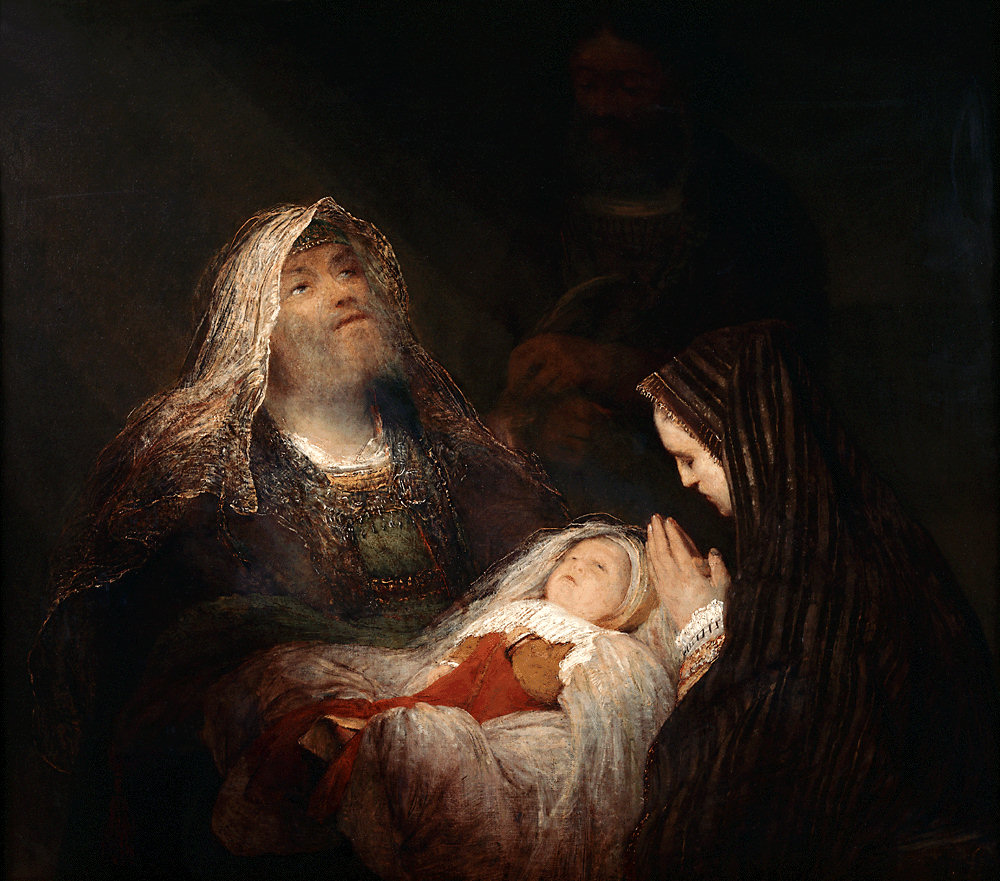
- Simeon's Song of Praise, c. 1700–1710
- Occasion: Purification of the Virgin
- Chorale: "Mit Fried und Freud ich fahr dahin" by Martin Luther
- Performed: 2 February 1725: Leipzig
- Movements: 6
- Vocal: SATB choir; solo: alto, tenor and bass
- Instrumental: horn; flauto traverso; oboe; oboe d'amore; 2 violins; viola; continuo

Johann Sebastian Bach composed the cantata Mit Fried und Freud ich fahr dahin (German: [mɪt ˈfʁiːt ʔʊnt ˈfʁɔʏt ʔɪç ˈfaːɐ̯ daˈhɪn]; "With peace and joy I depart"), BWV 125, (Note: "BWV" is Bach-Werke-Verzeichnis, a thematic catalogue of Bach's works.) for use in a Lutheran service. He composed this chorale cantata in Leipzig in 1725 for the feast for the Purification of Mary, which is celebrated on 2 February and is also known as Candlemas. The cantata is based on Martin Luther's 1524 hymn "Mit Fried und Freud ich fahr dahin" and forms part of Bach's chorale cantata cycle, written to provide Sundays and feast days of the liturgical year with cantatas based on a related Lutheran hymn.

The gospel for the feast day, the presentation of Jesus at the Temple, includes Simeon's canticle Nunc dimittis, which Luther paraphrased in his hymn, providing an unusually close relationship between the hymn and the liturgical occasion. Bach had used single stanzas of the hymn in his early funeral cantata Gottes Zeit ist die allerbeste Zeit, BWV 106, and in cantatas of his first Leipzig cycle.

In the format of the chorale cantata cycle, an unknown librettist retained the first and last of Luther's four stanzas while paraphrasing the inner stanzas. In this cantata, he also used the original text of the second stanza, interspersed with his words, as the third movement, a recitative, after he paraphrased the same ideas for the second movement, an aria. The librettist derived text for two more movements from Luther's third stanza. Bach structured the cantata in six movements, framing four movements for soloists by a chorale fantasia and a closing chorale. He scored the work for three vocal soloists, a four-part choir, and a Baroque ensemble consisting of horn, flauto traverso, oboe, oboe d'amore, strings and basso continuo. The opening chorus has been compared to the opening movement of Bach's St Matthew Passion. In the third movement, Bach sets the single lines from the hymn's second stanza differently from the commentary in the librettist's words, but unifies both elements by a continuous "motif of joy" in the accompaniment.

== Background ==
=== Chorale cantata cycle ===
In 1723, Bach was appointed as Thomaskantor (director of church music) in Leipzig. He was employed by the town of Leipzig to this position, which made him responsible for the music at four churches and for the training and education of boys singing in the Thomanerchor. Cantata music had to be provided for two major churches, Thomaskirche (St. Thomas) and Nikolaikirche (St. Nicholas), and simpler church music for two others, Neue Kirche (New Church) and Peterskirche (St. Peter).

Bach took office in the middle of the liturgical year, on the first Sunday after Trinity. In Leipzig, cantata music was expected on Sundays and on feast days, except during the "silent periods" ("tempus clausum") of Advent and Lent. In his first twelve months in office, Bach decided to compose new works for almost all liturgical events. These works became known as his first cantata cycle. The following year, he continued that effort, composing a cycle of chorale cantatas, with each cantata based on one Lutheran hymn, including Mit Fried und Freud ich fahr dahin, for these occasions. The choice of hymns to use in the series of chorale cantatas was probably made according to the wishes of a local minister, who based the choice upon the prescribed readings and his plans for sermons.

=== Luther's hymns ===
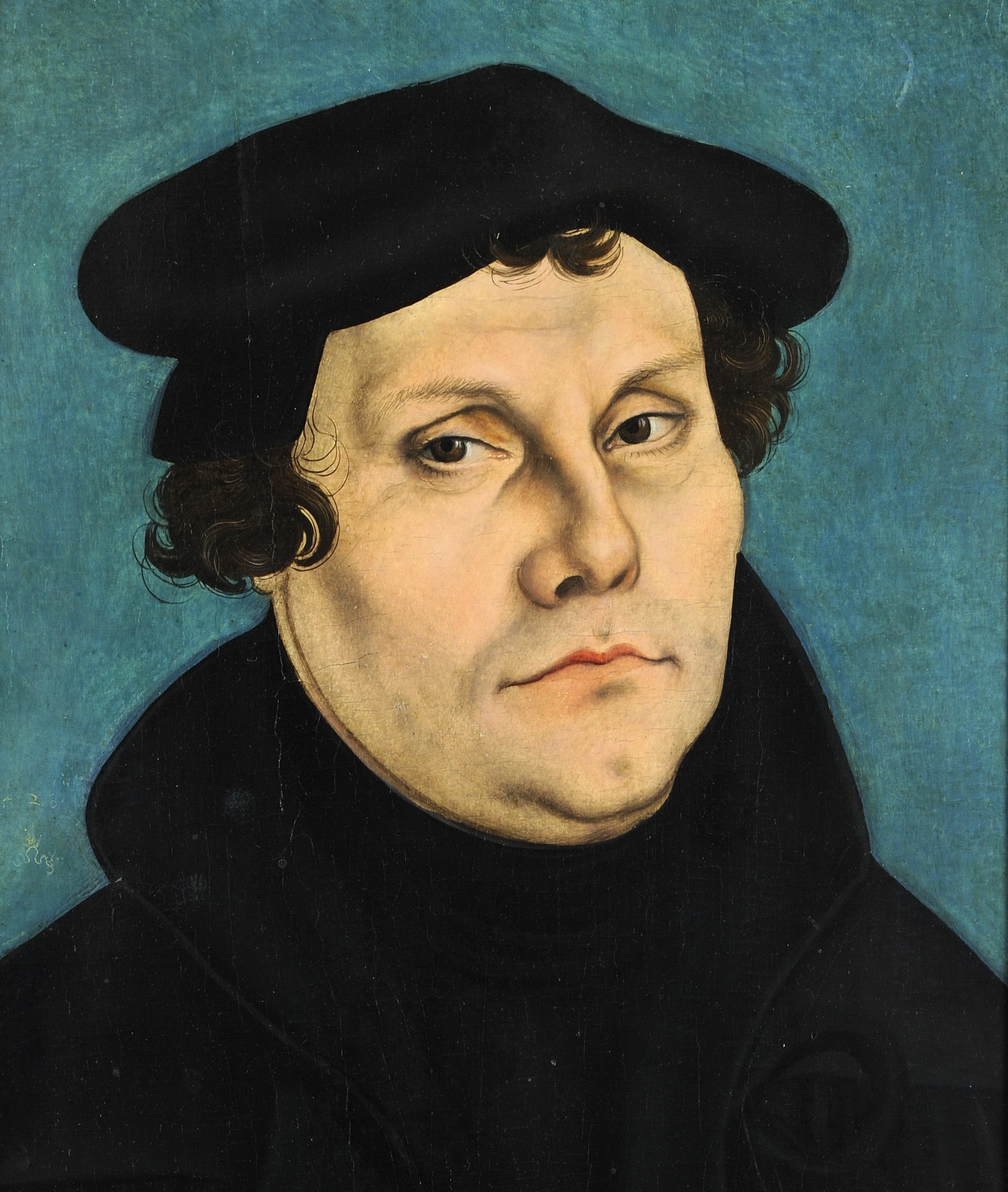
Martin Luther, portrait by Lucas Cranach, 1528

In the 16th century Martin Luther, the Protestant reformer, emphasised the importance of hymn singing in church services and at home, authoring many hymns, including "Mit Fried und Freud ich fahr dahin".

Bach composed an early chorale cantata on a hymn by Luther, Christ lag in Todes Banden, BWV 4, probably in 1707. During his chorale cantata cycle, Bach used a hymn by Luther as the basis for a cantata on nine occasions. Additionally, he performed Christ lag in Todes Banden again during that cycle.

The following table shows the cantatas that Bach performed based on hymns by Luther during the chorale cantata cycle, comprising nine new compositions and the repeated performance of the Easter cantata. The first column gives the cantata number with a link to the article about it, and the following column gives the hymn of the same name on which it is based. The third column shows the liturgical occasion, and the fourth the date of the performance, which is the first performance for all but the Easter cantata.

No.	Hymn	Liturgical occasion	Date
2	"Ach Gott, vom Himmel sieh darein"	Second Sunday after Trinity	18 June 1724
7	"Christ unser Herr zum Jordan kam"	St. John's Day	24 June 1724
10	"Meine Seel erhebt den Herren"	Visitation	2 July 1724
38	"Aus tiefer Not schrei ich zu dir"	21st Sunday after Trinity	29 October 1724
62	"Nun komm, der Heiden Heiland"	First Sunday of Advent	3 December 1724
91	"Gelobet seist du, Jesu Christ"	Christmas	25 December 1724
121	"Christum wir sollen loben schon"	Second Day of Christmas	26 December 1724
125	"Mit Fried und Freud ich fahr dahin"	Purification	2 February 1725
126	"Erhalt uns, Herr, bei deinem Wort"	Sexagesima	4 February 1725
4	"Christ lag in Todesbanden"	Easter	1 April 1725 (repeated)

Bach used Luther's hymns in other works during his career. He had included "Ein feste Burg ist unser Gott" earlier in a cantata for Advent, Alles, was von Gott geboren, BWV 80a, which he reworked as a chorale cantata for Reformation Day (BWV 80). He finally composed Wär Gott nicht mit uns diese Zeit, BWV 14, for the Fourth Sunday after Epiphany in 1735.

=== Bach's chorale cantata structure ===
Bach followed a specific structure for most of the cantatas in this cycle. He deviated from using the strophic hymn text and tune in all stanzas (per omnes versus), as he had in Christ lag in Todes Banden. Instead, he retained the original text and melody only in the outer stanzas, typically treating the first as a chorale fantasia and the last as a four-part chorale setting, while the inner stanzas were reworded by a librettist as the basis for recitatives and arias, often with music independent of the hymn tune. Andreas Stübel (1653–1725), a former headmaster of the Thomasschule, may have been this librettist.

== Readings, hymn and cantata text ==
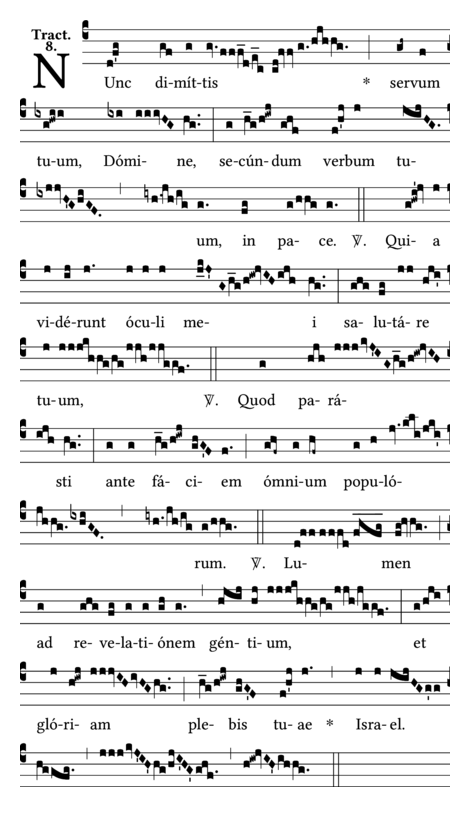
Nunc dimittis, Gregorian chant

During Bach's time in Leipzig, three Marian feasts were observed and celebrated: Annunciation (25 March), Visitation (2 July) and Purification (2 February). The prescribed readings for the Feast of the Purification (German: Mariae Reinigung) were from the Book of Malachi's, "the Lord will come to his temple" (Malachi 3:1–4), and the Gospel of Luke's version of the purification of Mary and the presentation of Jesus at the Temple, which includes Simeon's canticle Nunc dimittis (Luke 2:22–32).

When Luther wrote his hymn on Simeon's canticle ("With peace and joy I depart in God's will"), he devoted one stanza to each of the four verses of the biblical text. The first verse discusses peaceful acceptance of death (Luke 2:29), the second gives as a reason for that the meeting with the Saviour (Luke 2:30), the third is focused on Christ's return for all people (Luke 2:31), and the fourth sees the Second Coming as a light for the heathen and glory for Israel (Luke 2:31). The lines are of different length, with a metre of 8.4.8.4.7.7, stressing single statements in the short lines.

The tune first appeared in 1524 in Johann Walter's choral hymnal Eyn geystlich Gesangk Buchleyn. Luther wrote commentary on his hymn:

As [Simeon] means, Praise and thanks be to God that I have lived to see this day, I will now gladly die, now my death will be delightful, because God has fulfilled what He called me to do. Why will you so gladly die, dear Simeon? 'For my eyes have seen your Salvation.' (Als wolt er [Simeon] sagen / Gott sey lob und danck / daß ich diesen Tag erlebet habe / ich will nun gerne sterben / nun soll mir der Tod lieblich seyn / denn es ist erfüllet / das mir verheissen war. Warum wiltu aber so gerne sterben / lieber Simeon? 'Denn meine Augen haben deinen Heyland gesehen.')

Bach first used the hymn as part of his early funeral cantata Gottes Zeit ist die allerbeste Zeit, BWV 106 (Actus tragicus), the alto singing the first stanza, juxtaposed to a bass arioso, "Heute wirst du mit mir im Paradies sein". He returned to it twice for his first Leipzig cantata cycle. The first stanza was the basis for his cantata for the 16th Sunday after Trinity of 1723, Christus, der ist mein Leben, BWV 95, along with the first stanza of the funeral hymn "Christus, der ist mein Leben" in the opening movement for tenor. The second occasion was in 1724, in the Purification cantata, Erfreute Zeit im neuen Bunde, BWV 83, which he closed with the fourth and final stanza, "Es ist das Heil und selig Licht".

For Mit Fried und Freud ich fahr dahin, a librettist retained the first and last stanzas and paraphrased the two inner stanzas to four movements. The second movement, based on Luther's second stanza, is focused on Simeon's perspective as a means of how to anticipate one's own death. The third movement interweaves Luther's complete text with a free recitative. The Bach scholar Klaus Hofmann notes that the librettist had room to add his own text because Luther's hymn is rather short. The allusion to "light for the heathen" from the gospel and the hymn refers to "He that believeth and is baptized shall be saved" (Mark 16:16). Luther's third stanza forms the basis for the fourth and fifth movements. The fourth movement refers to Paul's teaching about the grace of God, ("Whom God hath set forth to be a propitiation through faith in his blood, to declare his righteousness for the remission of sins that are past, through the forbearance of God") (Romans 3:25). It declares the Lutheran teaching of justification "by grace alone through faith alone because of Christ alone" even more clearly than Luther's song.

Bach led the first performance with the Thomanerchor in the morning service at the Nikolaikirche on 2 February 1725, and reprised it in the vesper service in the Thomaskirche, as was usual in Leipzig on high holidays. Bach performed it at least one more time after 1735.

== Music ==
=== Structure and scoring ===
Bach structured the cantata in six movements. The first and last are set for choir as a chorale fantasia and a closing chorale. They frame alternating recitatives and arias with the text arranged by the librettist. Bach scored the work for three vocal soloists (alto (A), tenor (T) and bass (B)), a four-part choir, and a Baroque instrumental ensemble: horn (Co) to support the chorale tune sung by the soprano in the outer movements, flauto traverso (Ft), oboe (Ob), oboe d'amore (Oa), two violins (Vl), viola (Va), and basso continuo (Bc). The title page of the original parts reads: "Festo Purificat: Mari[ae] / Mit Fried und Freud ich fahr dahin etc. / â / 4 Voc: / Travers: / Hautbois d' Amour / 2 Violini / Viola / con / Continuo / di / Sign: / JS. Bach". The duration of the cantata is given as around 24 minutes.

In the following table of the movements, the scoring follows the Neue Bach-Ausgabe. The keys and time signatures are taken from the book by Bach scholar Alfred Dürr, using the symbol for common time (4/4). The instruments are shown separately for winds and strings, while the continuo, playing throughout, is not shown.

Movements of Mit Fried und Freud ich fahr dahin, BWV 125
No.	Title	Text	Type	Vocal	Winds	Strings	Key	Time
1	Mit Fried und Freud ich fahr dahin	Luther	Chorale fantasia	SATB	Co Ft Ob	2Vl Va	E minor	12/8
2	Ich will auch mit gebrochnen Augen	anon.	Aria	A	Ft Oa		B minor	3/4
3	O Wunder, daß ein Herz; Das macht Christus, wahr' Gottes Sohn	anon.; Luther	Recitative e chorale	B		2Vl Va		common time
4	Ein unbegreiflich Licht	anon.	Aria (Duetto)	T B		2Vl	G major	common time
5	O unerschöpfter Schatz der Güte	anon.	Recitative	A				common time
6	Er ist das Heil und selig Licht	Luther	Chorale	SATB	Co Ft Ob	2Vl Va	E minor	common time

=== Movements ===
==== 1 ====
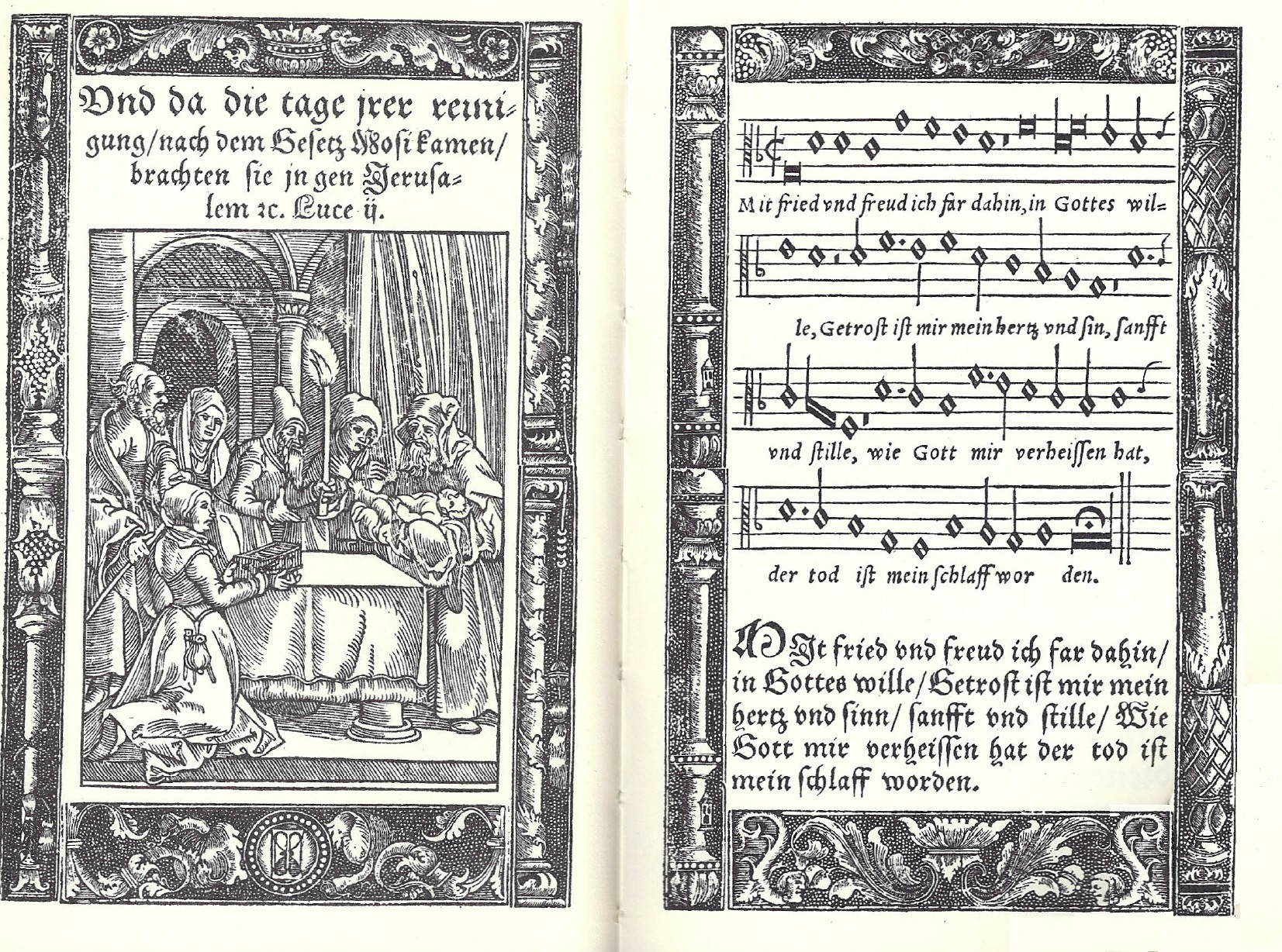
The first stanza of the chorale in the hymnal Babstsches Gesangbuch of 1545, with an illustration of the Presentation at the temple

The opening chorus, "Mit Fried und Freud ich fahr dahin in Gottes Willen" (With peace and joy I depart in God's will), begins with a concertante ritornello, in which the flute and oboe play opposed to the strings. A motif in triplets at the beginning of the movement settles on a note a fifth above where it starts, related to the first interval of the chorale tune. The fifth and the triplet motion dominate the entire movement.

Mit Fried und Freud ich fahr dahin
In Gottes Willen,
Getrost ist mir mein Herz und Sinn,
Sanft und stille.
Wie Gott mir verheißen hat:
Der Tod ist mein Schlaf worden.

Translation:

With peace and joy I go on my way
in God's will.
My heart and mind are comforted,
peaceful and calm.
As God promised me
death has become my sleep.

The soprano sings the cantus firmus in long notes. Hofmann notes that the Dorian mode within the instrumental concerto in E minor adds a "slightly archaic flavour". The lower voices participate in the instrumental motifs for lines 1, 2, 3 and 5, but lines 4 and 6 are treated differently. In accordance to the text, "sanft und stille" (calm and quiet) and "der Tod ist mein Schlaf worden" (death has become my sleep), they are performed softly (piano), in homophony, chromatically, and modulating to distant keys. Dürr notes the movement's "extremely dense, highly expressive texture" with motifs independent from the hymn tune but derived from its beginning. The Bach scholar Richard D. P. Jones observes that the movement foreshadows Kommt, ihr Töchter, helft mir klagen, the opening chorus of Bach's St Matthew Passion, in key, 12/8 metre and "much more".

==== 2 ====
The alto aria, "Ich will auch mit gebrochnen Augen nach dir, mein treuer Heiland, sehn." (Even with broken eyes, I will look for You, my loving Savior.), is a sarabande with slow dotted rhythms. The vocal line is accompanied by the flute and oboe d'amore, on a foundation of repeated notes in the continuo, marked "legato". The phrase "gebrochne Augen" (broken eyes) is pictured by a broken vocal line, with flute and oboe d'amore playing a dotted rhythm to the "almost trembling declamation" of the voice. Hofmann notes the movement's "emotions of grief and lamentation", while Dürr writes: "Rich suspension appoggiaturas, and other ornaments, reveal that an expressive interpretation of this movement lay particularly close to the composer's heart."

==== 3 ====
The bass recitative begins with a thought of the librettist, "O Wunder, daß ein Herz vor der dem Fleisch verhaßten Gruft und gar des Todes Schmerz sich nicht entsetzet!" (O wonder, that a heart before the flesh-abhorred tomb, and even the pain of death does not recoil!). The text continues with the beginning of the hymn's second stanza, "Das macht Christus, wahr' Gottes Sohn, der treue Heiland" (Christ, God's true son, does this, the loving Savior). The pattern of comment and original is retained throughout the movement in a hybrid text that holds in single lines the complete text of the second stanza:

Das macht Christus, wahr' Gottes Sohn,
Der treue Heiland,
Den du mich, Herr, hast sehen lan,
Und machst bekannt
Daß er sei das Leben und Heil,
Im Tod und auch im Sterben.

Translation:

This is the work of Christ, God's true son,
the faithful saviour,
whom you, Lord, have allowed me to see
and made known
that He is our life and salvation
in trouble and in dying.

Bach sets the recitative and chorale elements differently, rendering the librettist's text in "rhythmically free diction of recitative" and the chorale as arioso. He unifies the movement by a continuous motif in the strings, called Freudenmotiv by Dürr, which "always indicates an underlying mood of happiness". The chorale tune is unadorned but for the last line, "im Tod und auch im Sterben" (in death and also in dying), where the music is extended by two measures and coloured in chromatic and rich ornamentation, and the strings cease to play the constant motif and accompany in "tranquil notes".

==== 4 ====
The tenor and bass duet "Ein unbegreiflich Licht erfüllt den ganzen Kreis der Erden" (An unfathomable light fills the entire orb of the earth) is focused on the light mentioned by Simeon, expressed in a joyful mood. Hofmann notes: "The playful character is shown by the extended, circling coloratura on the word 'Kreis' ('circle' or 'orb'), and the baroque sound effect of statement and response unfolds to the words 'Es schallet kräftig fort und fort' (Powerfully there rings out time after time.)" Jones comments that the trio sonata of two violins and continuo which accompanies the voices "in its vigour and fluency perhaps represents the powerful, continuous sound to which the text refers."

==== 5 ====
The alto expresses in a secco recitative "O unerschöpfter Schatz der Güte" (O boundless hoard of goodness), which Hofmann calls a "concise theological analysis".

==== 6 ====
The closing chorale, "Er ist das Heil und selig Licht" (He is the salvation and the blessed light), is a four-part setting of the hymn tune.

Er ist das Heil und selig Licht
Für die Heiden,
Zu erleuchten, die dich kennen nicht,
Und zu weiden.
Er ist deins Volks Israel
Der Preis, Ehr, Freud, und Wonne.

Translation:

He is salvation and a blessed light
for the gentiles,
to enlighten those who do not know you,
and to give them pasture.
For your people Israel He is
their reward, honour, joy and delight.

The horn and flute (an octave higher), oboe, and first violin all reinforce the soprano part, the second violin the alto, and the viola the tenor.

Jones summarizes in his book The Creative Development of Johann Sebastian Bach: "The exceptionally high quality of the music may reflect Bach's response to the divine authority of the Nunc dimittis, mediated by the revered founder of the Lutheran Church."

== Manuscripts and publication ==
The autograph score is lost, its last documented owner being Christian Friedrich Penzel, one of Bach's last students and a copyist of his works. The original parts are kept in the Bach-Archiv Leipzig. They were copied from the lost autograph score by four scribes, three of them known by name, including the composer. A set of three duplicate parts is kept in the Staatsbibliothek zu Berlin – Preußischer Kulturbesitz as D-B Mus. ms. Bach St 384, Faszikel 1. They were copied by five scribes, of which three are known by name: Christian Gottlob Meißner, Wilhelm Friedemann Bach and Johann Andreas Kuhnau. The set has a title page and parts for violin I and II, and continuo.

The score for the first movement was first published by Anton Diabelli around 1835 with a Latin text, Da pacem nobis Domine. The cantata was originally published in 1878 as No. 4 in volume 26 of the Bach-Gesellschaft Ausgabe (BGA), edited by Alfred Dörffel. The New Bach Edition (Neue Bach-Ausgabe, NBA) published the score in 1994, edited by Uwe Wolf, with the critical commentary published the same year.

A critical edition was published by Breitkopf, edited by Eva-Maria Hodel. Another was published by Carus in 2008, edited by Wolfram Enßlin, which also provided a singable English version.

== Recordings ==
The selection is taken from the listing on the Bach Cantatas Website. Instrumental groups playing period instruments in historically informed performances are highlighted in green under the heading "Instr.".

Recordings of Mit Fried und Freud ich fahr dahin
Title	Conductor / Choir / Orchestra	Soloists	Label	Year	Instr.
Die Bach Kantate Vol. 25	Helmuth Rilling Figuralchor der Gedächtniskirche Stuttgart Bach-Collegium Stuttgart	Marga Höffgen; Kurt Equiluz; Wolfgang Schöne	Hänssler	1973	
J. S. Bach: Das Kantatenwerk • Complete Cantatas • Les Cantates, Folge / Vol. 7	Nikolaus Harnoncourt Tölzer Knabenchor Concentus Musicus Wien	Paul Esswood; Kurt Equiluz; Thomas Thomaschke	Teldec	1982	Period
J. S. Bach: "Mit Fried und Freud"	Philippe Herreweghe Collegium Vocale Gent	Ingeborg Danz; Mark Padmore; Peter Kooy	Harmonia Mundi France	1998	Period
Bach Edition Vol. 14 – Cantatas Vol. 7	Pieter Jan Leusink Holland Boys Choir Netherlands Bach Collegium	Sytse Buwalda; Nico van der Meel; Bas Ramselaar	Brilliant Classics	2000	Period
J. S. Bach: Cantatas for the Feast of Purification of Mary	John Eliot Gardiner Monteverdi Choir English Baroque Soloists	Robin Tyson; Paul Agnew; Peter Harvey	Archiv Produktion	2000	Period
J. S. Bach: Complete Cantatas Vol. 14	Ton Koopman Amsterdam Baroque Orchestra & Choir	Bogna Bartosz; Jörg Dürmüller; Klaus Mertens	Antoine Marchand	2001	Period
Johann Sebastian Bach (1685–1750) / Cantatas: Volume 32 (Cantatas from Leipzig, 1725)	Masaaki Suzuki Bach Collegium Japan	Robin Blaze; Andreas Weller; Peter Kooy	BIS	2005	Period
Bach in Context, Vol. 5 – Actus Tragicus	Pieter-Jan Belder Gesualdo Consort (OVPP) Musica Amphion	Hana Blažíková; Terry Wey; Charles Daniels; Harry van der Kamp	Etcetera	2014	Period

== Bibliography ==
General

- "Mit Fried und Freud fahr ich dahin BWV 125; BC A 168 / Chorale cantata (Purification of the Virgin Mary (2 February))". Bach digital website, managed by Bach Archive, SLUB, SBB and Leipzig University. 2016.
- "Leipzig, Bach-Archiv Leipzig / D-LEb Thomana 125, Faszikel 1". Bach digital website, managed by Bach Archive, SLUB, SBB and Leipzig University. 2016.
- "Berlin, Staatsbibliothek zu Berlin – Preußischer Kulturbesitz / D-B Mus. ms. Bach St 384, Faszikel 1". Bach digital website, managed by Bach Archive, SLUB, SBB and Leipzig University. 2016.

Books

- Dürr, Alfred (1971). Die Kantaten von Johann Sebastian Bach (in German) (4 ed.). Deutscher Taschenbuchverlag. ISBN 978-3-423-04080-8.
- Dürr, Alfred; Jones, Richard D. P. (2006). The Cantatas of J. S. Bach: With Their Librettos in German-English Parallel Text. Oxford University Press. ISBN 978-0-19-929776-4.
- Jones, Richard D. P. (2013). The Creative Development of Johann Sebastian Bach, Volume II: 1717–1750: Music to Delight the Spirit. Oxford University Press. ISBN 978-0-19-150384-9.
- Luther, Martin (1828). "Sämmtliche Werke, Volume 15". Heyder.
- Melamed, Daniel R., ed. (2010). "J. S. Bach and the Oratorio Tradition". Bach Perspectives. Vol. 8. University of Illinois Press. ISBN 978-0-252-09021-9.

Journals

- Freeman-Attwood, Jonathan (2006). "Bach Cantatas, Vol 32". Gramophone.

Online sources

- Barfoot, Terry (2006). "Johann Sebastian Bach (1685–1750) / Cantatas: Volume 32 (Cantatas from Leipzig, 1725)". musicweb-international.com.
- Bischof, Walter F. (2010). "BWV 125 Mit Fried und Freud ich fahr dahin". University of Alberta.
- Braatz, Thomas; Oron, Aryeh (2005). "Chorale Melodies used in Bach's Vocal Works / Mit Fried und Freud ich fahr dahin". Bach Cantatas Website.
- Browne, Francis (2008). "Mit Fried und Freud / Text and translation of chorale". Bach Cantatas Website.
- Dellal, Pamela (2012). "BWV 125 – Mit Fried und Freud ich fahr dahin". Emmanuel Music.
- Enßlin, Wolfram (2008). "Mit Fried und Freud ich fahr dahin / BWV 125 – BC A 168" (PDF). Carus-Verlag.
- Grob, Jochen (2014). "BWV 125 / BC A 168". s-line.de (in German). Archived from the original on 5 February 2016.
- Hofmann, Klaus (2006). "Mit Fried und Freud ich fahr dahin / In peace and joy I shall depart, BWV 125" (PDF). Bach Cantatas Website.
- Isoyama, Tadashi (1995). "Cantata No.106: Gottes Zeit ist die allerbeste Zeit (BWV 106)" (PDF). Bach Cantatas Website.
- Oron, Aryeh (2015). "Cantata BWV 125 Mit Fried und Freud ich fahr dahin". Bach Cantatas Website.
- Riedstra, Siebe (2016). "CD-recensie". opusklassiek.nl (in Dutch).
- Tatlow, Ruth (2000). "For the Feast of the Purification of Mary" (PDF). Bach Cantatas Website.
- Wolff, Christoph (2001). "Conclusion of the second yearly cycle (1724–25) of the Leipzig church cantatas" (PDF). Bach Cantatas Website.
- "Berlin, Staatsbibliothek zu Berlin – Preußischer Kulturbesitz / D-B Mus. 11475/1 [Erstdruck]". Bach Digital, managed by Bach Archive, SLUB, SBB and Leipzig University.
- "Cantata BWV 125 Mit Fried und Freud ich fahr dahin". Breitkopf.
- "Johann Sebastian Bach / Mit Fried und Freud fahr ich dahin / Cantata for the Purification of Mary / BWV 125". Carus-Verlag.
- "Bach: Mit Fried Und Freud – Cantatas / Herreweghe, et al". ArkivMusic. 1998. Archived from the original on 30 January 2018.
- "Mit Fried' und Freud' ich fahr' dahin". hymnary.org.
- "Mit Fried' und Freud' ich fahr' dahin". muziekweb.nl (in Dutch).
