= A solis ortus cardine =

Latin hymn

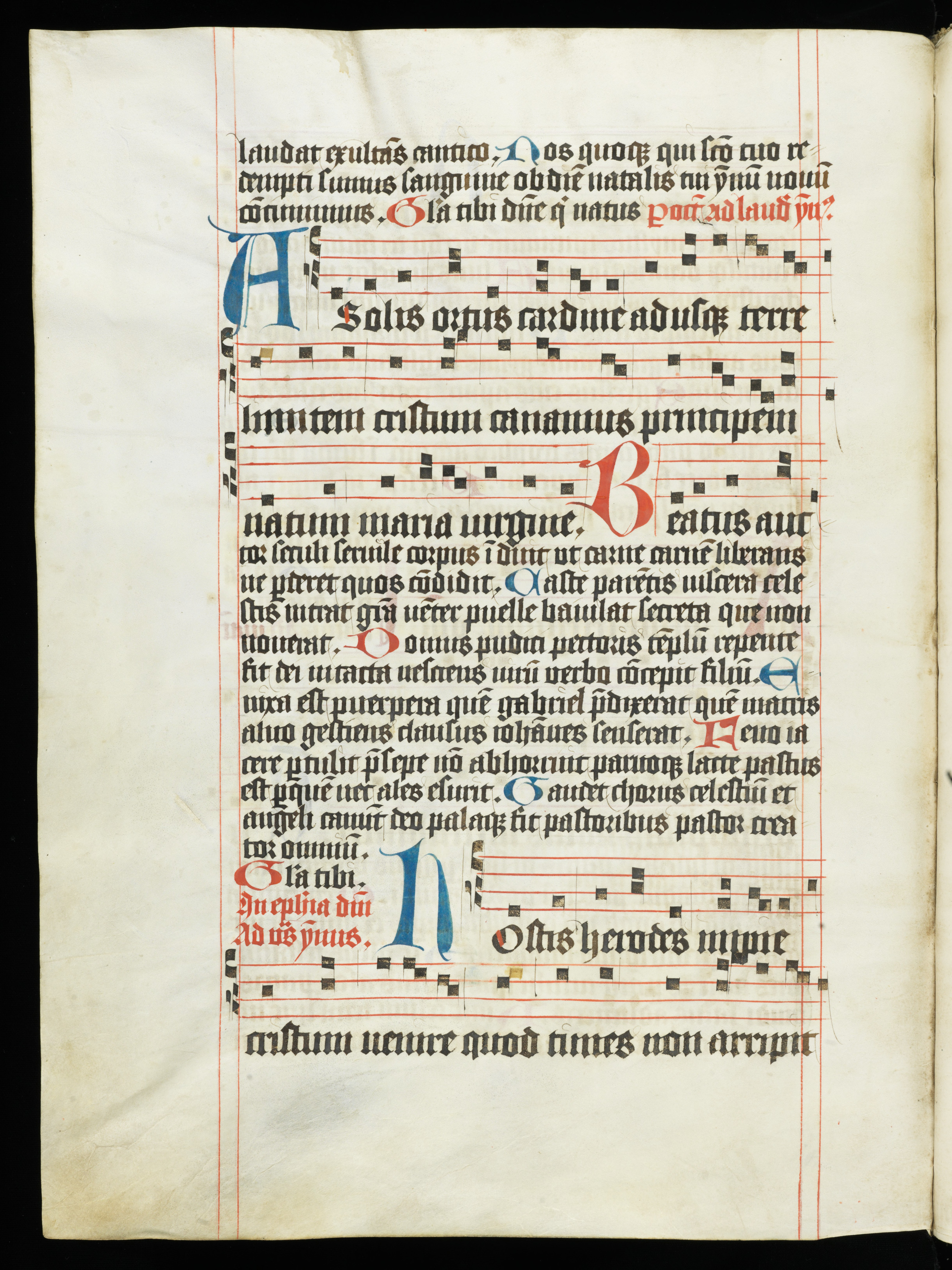
A solis ortus cardine in late 15C antiphonary from Dominican Abbey of St. Katherina, St. Gallen

"A solis ortus cardine" (Latin for "From the Pivot of the Sun's Rising") is a hymn by Sedulius (died c. 450), recounting Christ's life from his birth to his resurrection. Its 23 verses each begin with a consecutive letter of the Latin alphabet, making the poem an abecedarius. It is one of the oldest parts of the Roman Catholic liturgy, with two hymns formed from the first seven and four later verses. There have been monastic translations into Anglo-Saxon and later translations into other languages, most notably into German poetry by Martin Luther during the Reformation and the rendering into the Scottish Gaelic language by Fr Allan MacDonald. The original Latin hymn and Luther's translation have been set for chorus and organ by many composers including Dufay, di Lasso, Praetorius, Palestrina, Scheidt, de Grigny and Bach.

== History ==
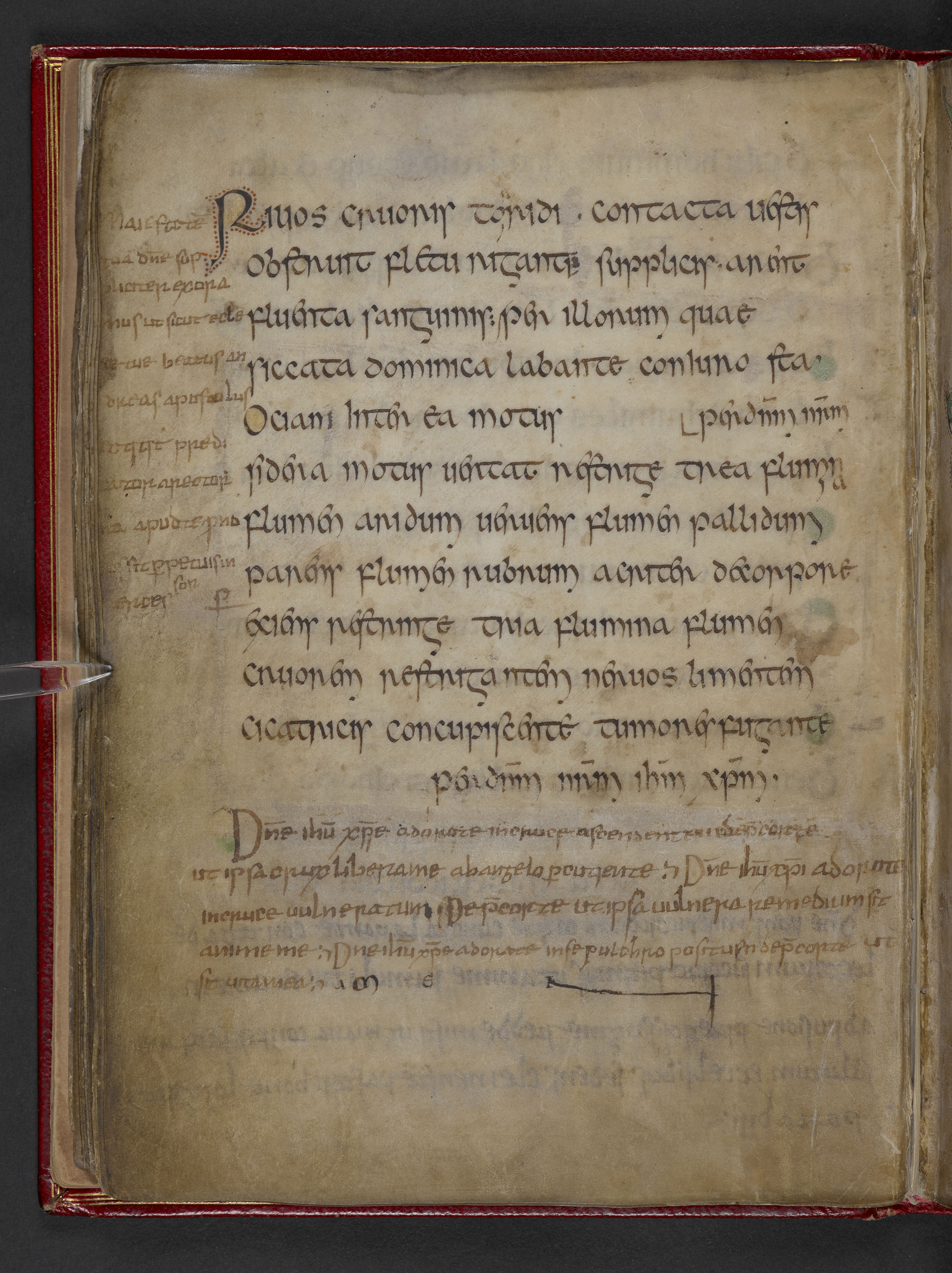
17th verse of A solis as charm against bleeding in prayerbook from Kingdom of Mercia, late 8C-early 9C, Royal MS 8 A XX, British Library

A solis ortus cardine... is a Latin hymn, written in the first half of the fifth century by the early Christian poet Sedulius. The abecedarius recounts in 23 quatrains of iambic dimeter the nativity, miracles and passion of Christ. With the other Latin texts of Sedulius, it enjoyed wide circulation in the church and in schools from late antiquity and medieval times until the end of the seventeenth century. The opening words are cited by Bede in his De Arte Metrica and were used without reference by medieval poets; and the seventeenth verse Rivos cruoris torridi, describing Christ's miraculous healing of the bleeding woman, was even proffered as a medieval charm against bleeding.

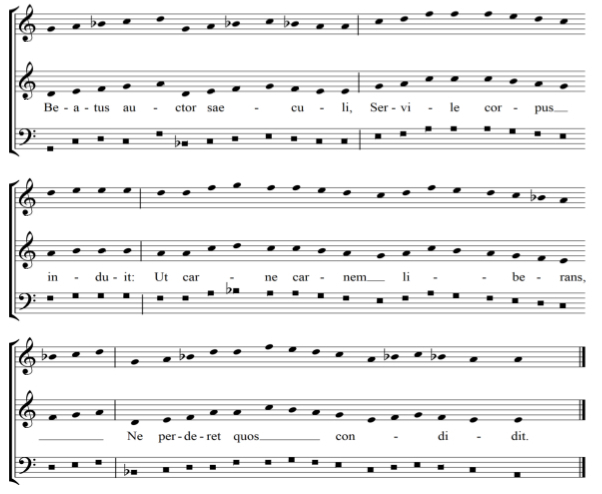
Early Tudor faburden of 2nd verse of A solis ortus cardine

The first seven verses, with a doxology verse by a different writer, were used from the early Middle Ages onwards as a Christmas hymn. They write of the striking contrast between the grandeur and omnipotence of the Word of God (the second person in the Trinity) and the vulnerable humanity of the child in whom the Word became flesh. In 1589, Palestrina set the odd verses (A,C,E,G) in Hymni totius anni secundum Sanctae Romanae Ecclesiae consuetudinem, necnon hymni religionum, a collection of hymns composed for the Vatican; liturgical practice was for the even verses to be sung in Gregorian plainchant.

A four-part setting of A solis ortus cardine, with the plainchant in the tenor, is annotated at the bottom of two pages from an early sixteenth century collection of madrigals and hymns in the Royal Library of Henry VIII (MS Royal Appendix 58). In early Tudor England, the Latin hymn was sung in three parts as a faburden with two voices added, one above and one below the plainchant. Polyphony of this kind became less common during the reign of Edward VI, when the English Reformation resulted in choirs being disbanded and organs dismantled.

Luther translated the first seven verses into the hymn "Christum wir sollen loben schon", which long remained the main German Protestant Christmas hymn until the new Evangelisches Gesangbuch of the 1990s, in which it did not appear. It was also set by Bach in his chorale cantata Christum wir sollen loben schon and his chorale prelude BWV 611.

Verses 8, 9, 11 and 13 of Sedulius' poem were also used, with an added doxology, as "Hostis Herodes impie..." ("O Herod, you impious foe..."), a hymn for the Epiphany. These verses narrate the story of Herod the Great and the Three Kings, along with the Baptism of Christ and the miracle at the wedding at Cana. Luther's translation of this hymn into German, as "Was fürchtst du, Feind Herodes, sehr", has long fallen out of use. The German-language Book of Hours also gives a translation of the verses 1, 2, 6 and 7 by Sedulius, plus a doxology, as "Vom hellen Tor der Sonnenbahn".

In the Catholic Liturgy of the Hours, the eight verse A solis ortus cardine and the five verse Hostis Herodes impie appear in the Latin original. Their early-church melody dates to the 5th century, beginning in the Dorian mode and ending in the Phrygian mode. Its numerous embellishments were later simplified, though most of them survive, even in Luther's versions. An almost syllabic version is in use in the modern Catholic liturgy.

== Text ==
Below is the text of A solis ortus cardine with the eleven verses translated into English by John Mason Neale in the nineteenth century. Since it was written, there have been many translations of the two hymns extracted from the text, A solis ortus cardine and Hostis Herodes impie, including Anglo-Saxon translations, Martin Luther's German translation and John Dryden's versification. Complete modern translations into English can be found in Walsh & Husch (2012) and Springer (2013); the literal translation is a paraphrase of these.

A solis ortus cardine ad usque terrae limitem christum canamus principem, natum maria virgine. Beatus auctor saeculi servile corpus induit, ut carne carnem liberans non perderet quod condidit. Clausae parentis viscera caelestis intrat gratia; venter puellae baiulat secreta quae non noverat. Domus pudici pectoris templum repente fit dei; intacta nesciens virum verbo concepit filium. Enixa est puerpera quem gabriel praedixerat, quem matris alvo gestiens clausus ioannes senserat. Foeno iacere pertulit, praesepe non abhorruit, parvoque lacte pastus est per quem nec ales esurit. Gaudet chorus caelestium et angeli canunt deum, palamque fit pastoribus pastor, creator omnium. Hostis herodes impie, christum venire quid times? non eripit mortalia, qui regna dat caelestia. Ibant magi, qua venerant stellam sequentes praeviam, lumen requirunt lumine, deum fatentur munere. Katerva matrum personat conlisa deflens pignora, quorum tyrannus milia christo sacravit victimam. Lavacra puri gurgitis caelestis agnus attigit, peccata quae non detulit nos abluendo sustulit. Miraculis dedit fidem habere se deum patrem, infirma sanans corpora et suscitans cadavera. Novum genus potentiae: aquae rubescunt hydriae vinumque iussa fundere mutavit unda originem. Orat salutem servulo flexus genu centurio, credentis ardor plurimus extinxit ignes febrium. Petrus per undas ambulat christi levatus dextera: natura quam negaverat fides paravit semitam. Quarta die iam fetidus vitam recepit lazarus mortisque liber vinculis factus superstes est sibi. Rivos cruoris torridi contacta vestis obstruit, fletu rigante supplicis arent fluenta sanguinis. Solutus omni corpore iussus repente surgere, suis vicissim gressibus aeger vehebat lectulum. Tunc ille iudas carnifex ausus magistrum tradere, pacem ferebat osculo, quam non habebat pectore. Verax datur fallacibus, pium flagellat impius, crucique fixus innocens coniunctus est latronibus. Xeromyrram post sabbatum quaedam vehebant compares, quas adlocutus angelus vivum sepulcro non tegi. Ymnis, venite, dulcibus omnes canamus subditum christi triumpho tartarum, qui nos redemit venditus. Zelum draconis invidi et os leonis pessimi calcavit unicus dei seseque caelis reddidit.	From lands that see the sun arise, To earth’s remotest boundaries, The virgin born today we sing, The Son of Mary, Christ the King. Blest Author of this earthly frame, To take a servant’s form He came, That liberating flesh by flesh, Whom He had made might live afresh. In that chaste parent’s holy womb, Celestial grace hath found its home: And she, as earthly bride unknown, Yet call that Offspring blest her own. The mansion of the modest breast Becomes a shrine where God shall rest: The pure and undefiled one Conceived in her womb the Son. That Son, that royal Son she bore, Whom Gabriel’s voice had told afore: Whom, in his Mother yet concealed, The Infant Baptist had revealed. The manger and the straw He bore, The cradle did He not abhor: A little milk His infant fare Who feedeth even each fowl of air. The heavenly chorus filled the sky, The angels sang to God on high, What time to shepherds watching lone They made creation’s Shepherd known. Why, impious Herod, vainly fear that Christ the Saviour cometh here? He takes no earthly realms away Who gives the crown that lasts for aye. To greet His birth the Wise Men went, led by the star before them sent; called on by light, towards Light they pressed, and by their gifts their God confessed. In holy Jordan's purest wave the heavenly Lamb vouchsafed to lave; That He, to whom was sin unknown, might cleanse His people from their own. New miracle of power divine! The water reddens into wine: He spake the word: and poured the wave in other streams than nature gave.	From the pivot of the sun's rising To the farthest edge of the earth Let us sing to Christ our lord Born of the virgin Mary. Blessed creator of the world Assuming the body of a slave, Freeing our flesh with his own flesh That what he made might not be lost. A close-barred maiden's inner parts Were breached by the grace of heaven; Burdened was the maiden's womb With secrets that she did not know. Quickly the home of her chaste breast Became the temple of the Lord; Untouched without knowledge of men, By the word she conceived a son. She laboured and then brought forth The One foretold by Gabriel; John, still in his mother's womb, Sensed it, as he leapt with joy. He bore with lying in the hay, He did not scorn the manger, And on a little milk He fed, Who let no bird in want of food. The heavenly choir was glad And angels of God's coming sang, To the shepherds they did unfold The Shepherd and Maker of all things. O Herod, you impious foe, Why fear the coming of Christ? Earthly realms he does not seize, The kingdom of heaven he gives. The wise men journeyed towards the star Which led them on their coming. Seeking one Light with another, Their gifts proclaimed him God. A multitude of mothers cried out, Weeping at their children's deaths; Slain by the tyrrant in thousands, Sacrificial victims for Christ. Into the streams of pure water Entered the heavenly Lamb; Taking on Himself the sins of the world, With his cleansing we were absolved. By miracles did he give proof That he had God as father; Healing those sick in body, Bringing back the dead to life. Yet new kinds of powers! The water in the ewers turned red, And, when ordered to pour with wine, The source of the flow was changed. On bended knee a centurion Begged for his servant's health; The burning ardour of his faith Put out the fever's flames. Peter walked forward through the waves, Held fast by Christ's right hand. Where nature denied there was a way His faith a footpath made. On his fourth malodorous day, Lazarus recovered his life, And, once freed from the shackles of death, Became heir unto himself. Streams of flowing gore were stopped, With one touch to His robes; The running tears of the suppliant Dried up the torrents of blood. Lifeless in all his body, But suddenly commanded to rise, A sick man could on his own again Carry away his bed. Then that hangman Judas, Having dared betray his master, Peace did offer with a kiss, Which came not from his heart. The truthful was betrayed to liars The pious was scourged by the godless, The untainted was nailed to the cross, Sharing his lot with thieves. As Sabbath passed, anointing myrrh Was brought by women of His fellowship To whom an angel said: He lives, He lies no longer in the tomb. Come let us with dulcet hymns Join to sing of the overthrow Of Tartarus by the triumph of Christ Who, though sold, redeemed us all. The zeal of the envious serpent, The jaws of the fearsome lion, God's only son did trample down Then rise back into the heavens.

== Gallery ==
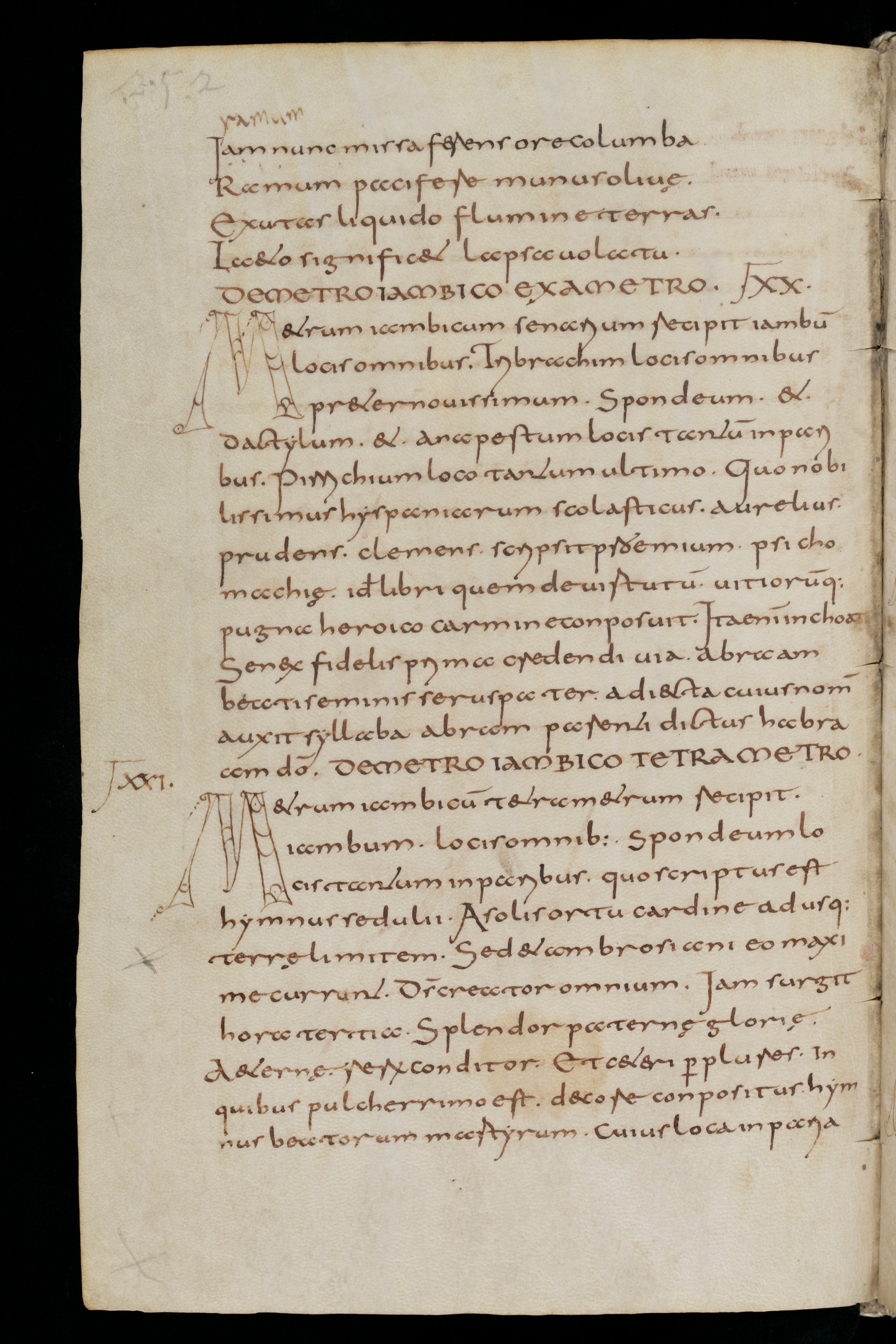
Bede cites A solis in De arte metrica XXI, Abbey of St Gall, c800

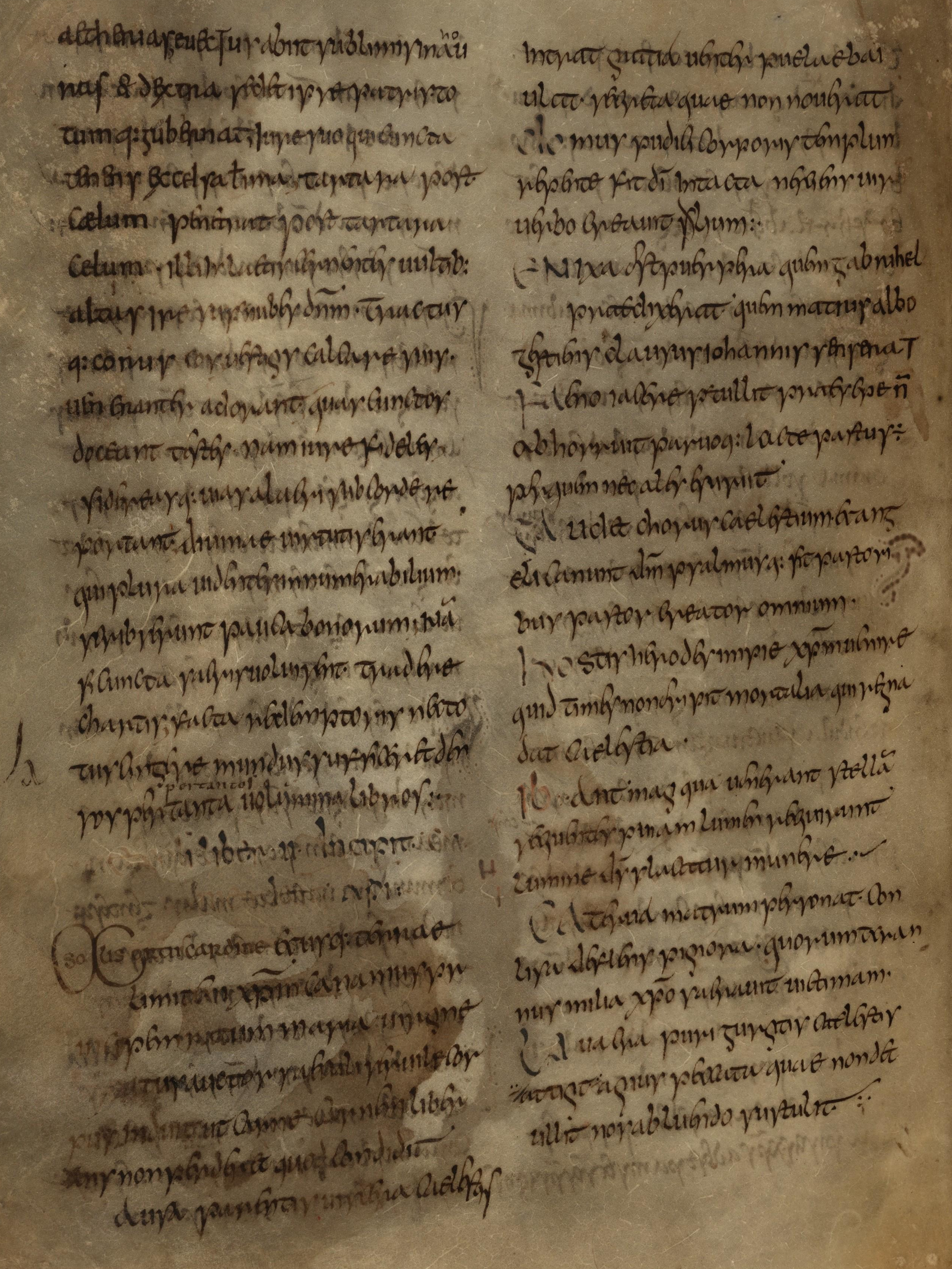
Page 1 of A solis bound with Parker Chronicle, Canterbury, 8C-9C

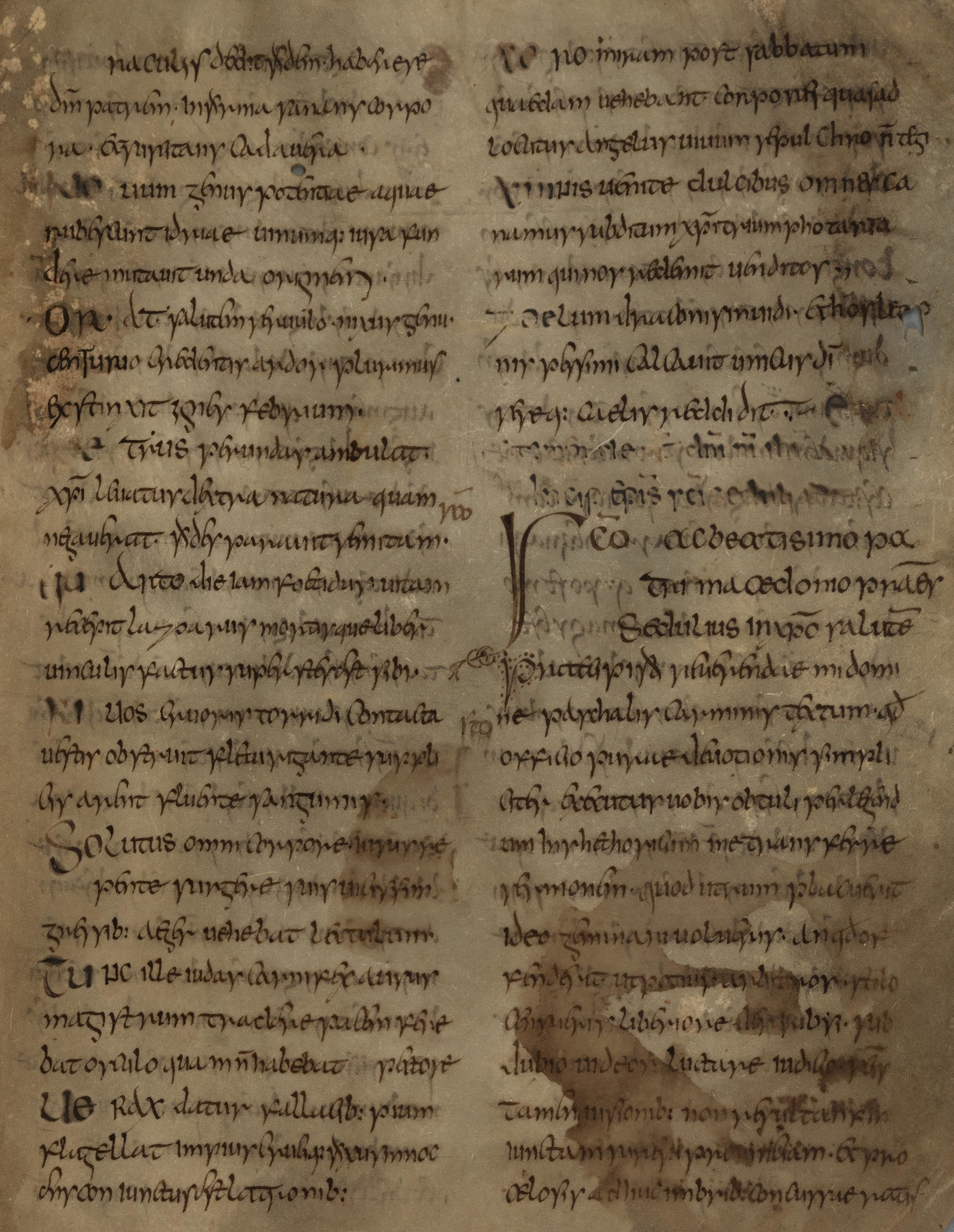
Page 2 of A solis, Canterbury

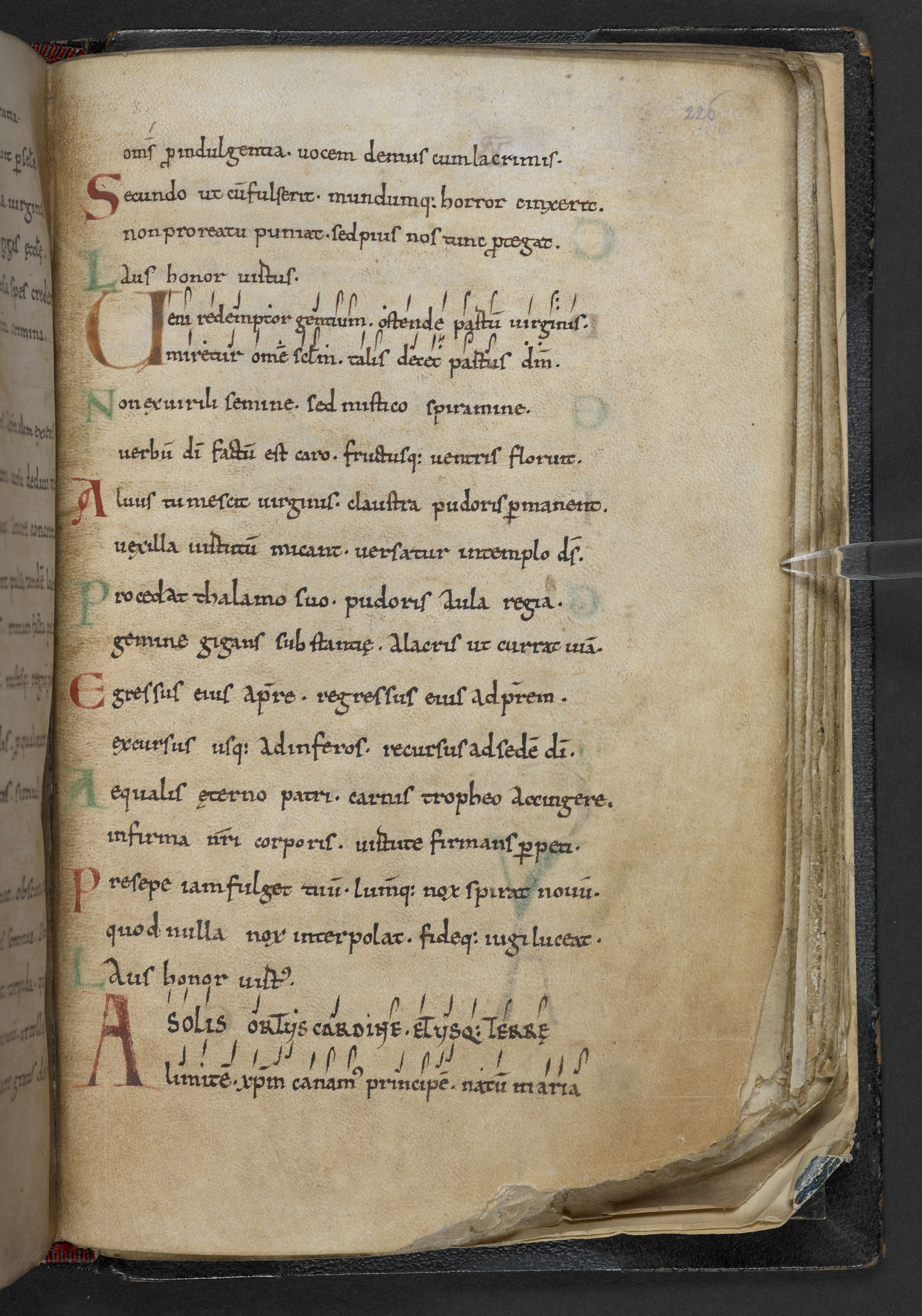
Page 1 of A solis in Leofric Collectar, Exeter 11th century

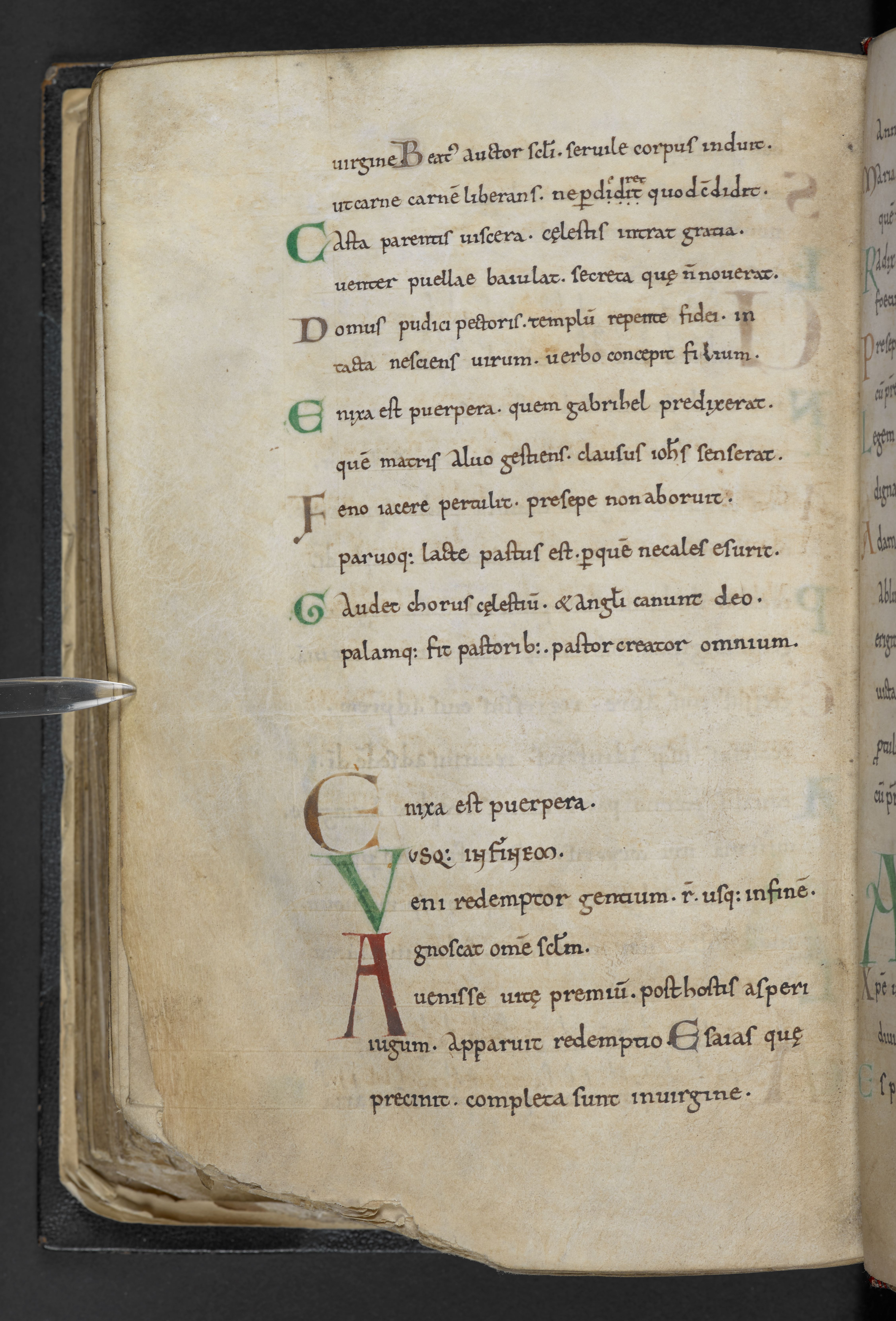
Page 2 of A solis in Leofric Collectar

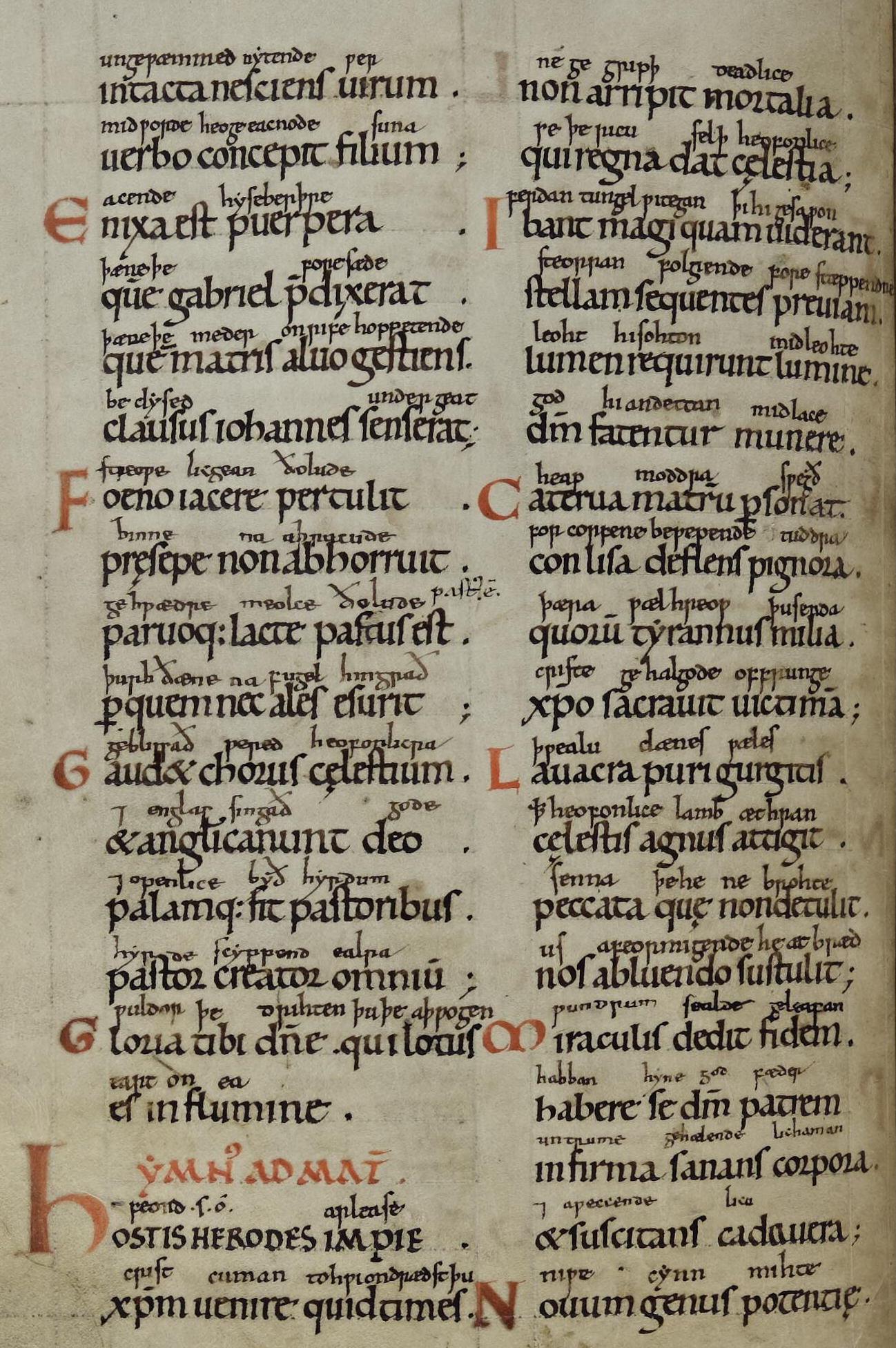
Part of A solis with Anglo-Saxon gloss, Durham, 11th century

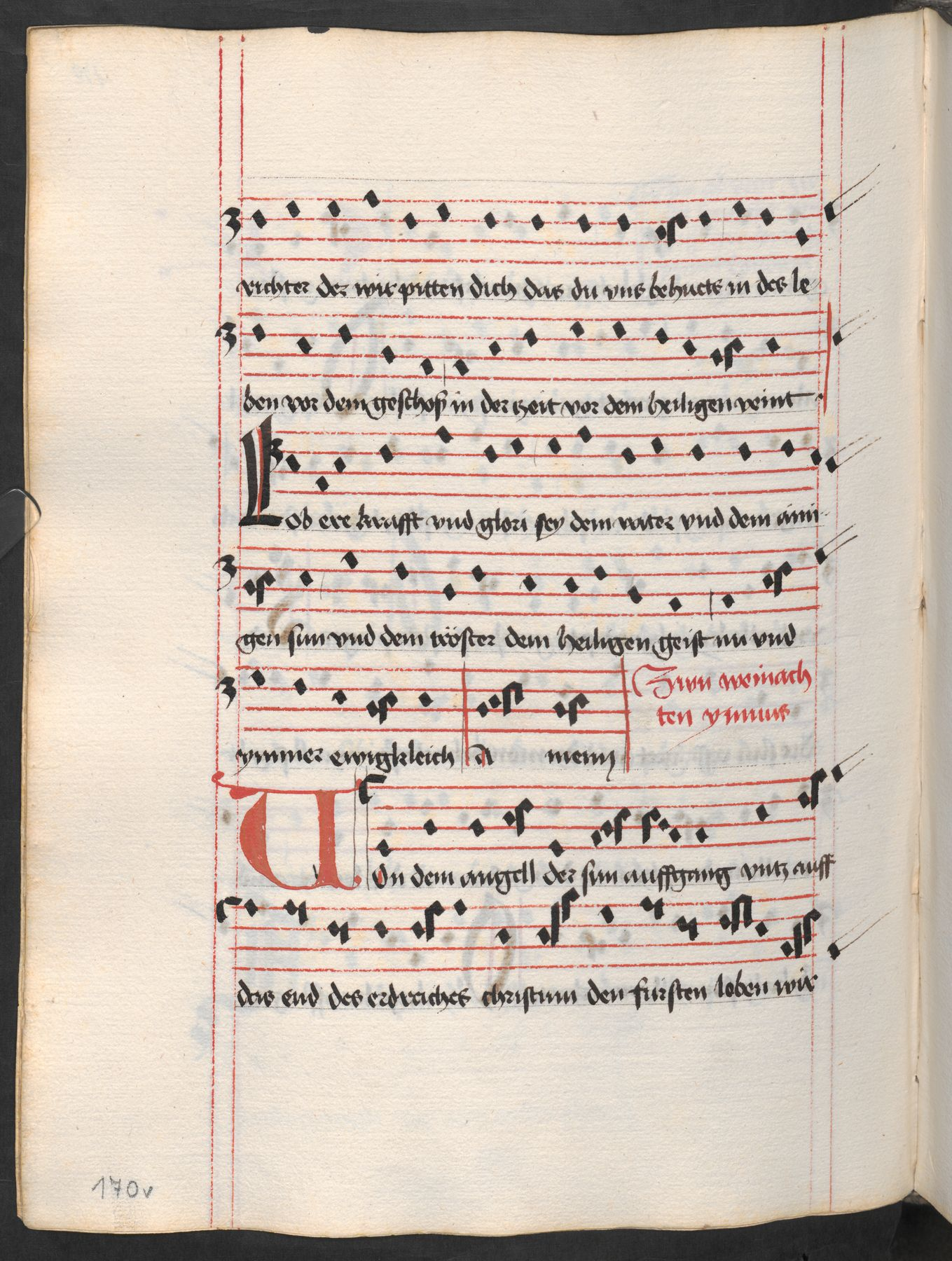
Page 1 of A solis in German breviary, Innsbruck 1477

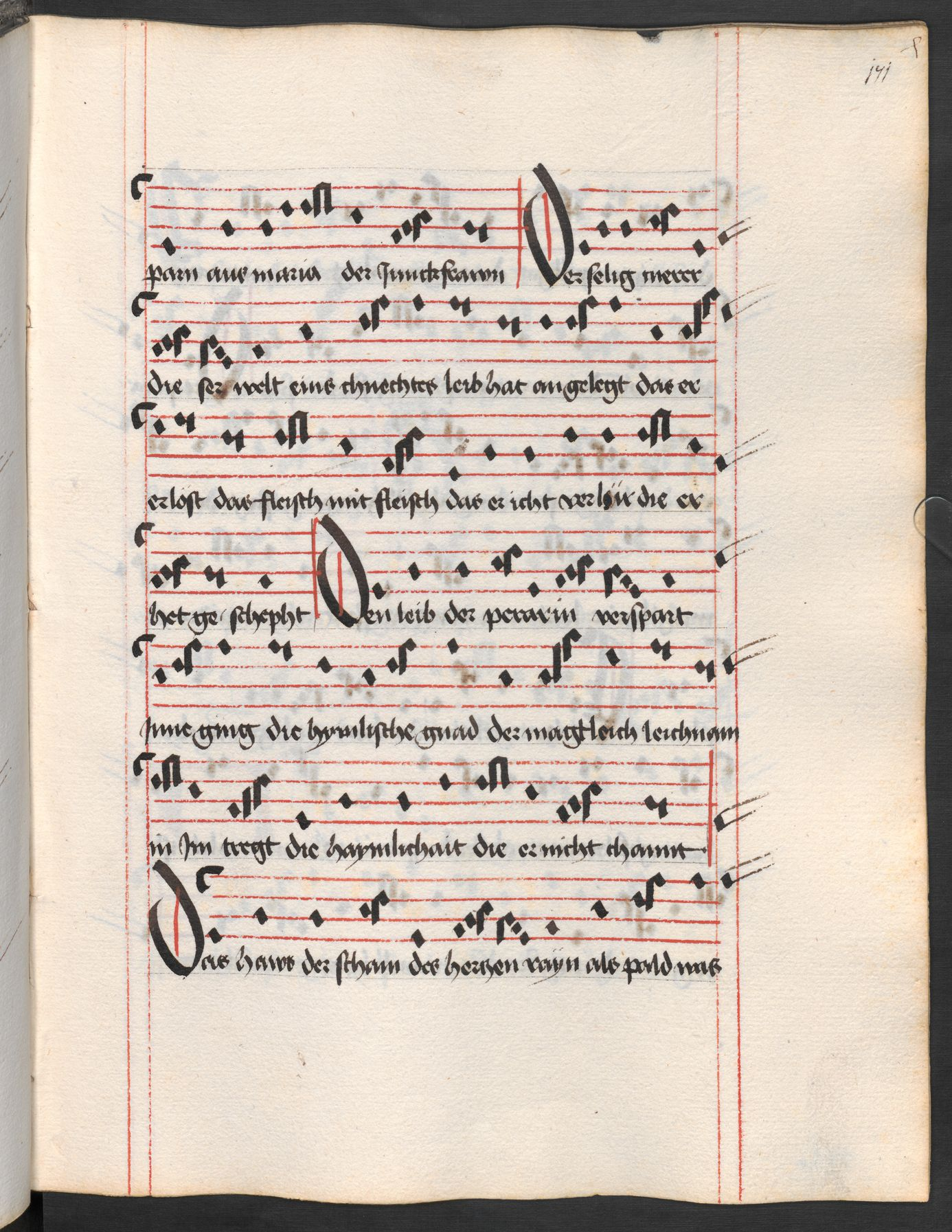
Page 2 of A solis in German breviary

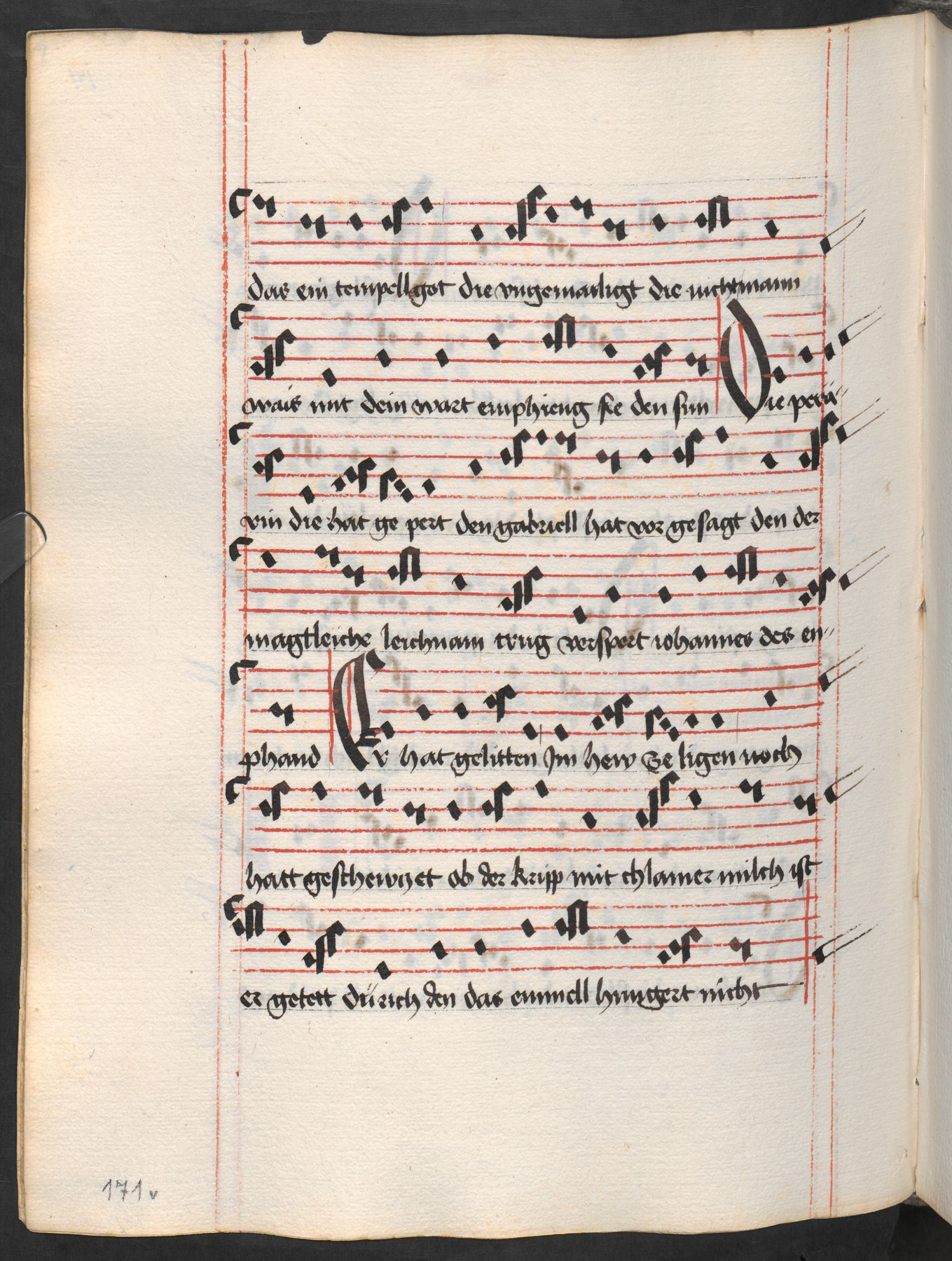
Page 3 of A solis in German breviary

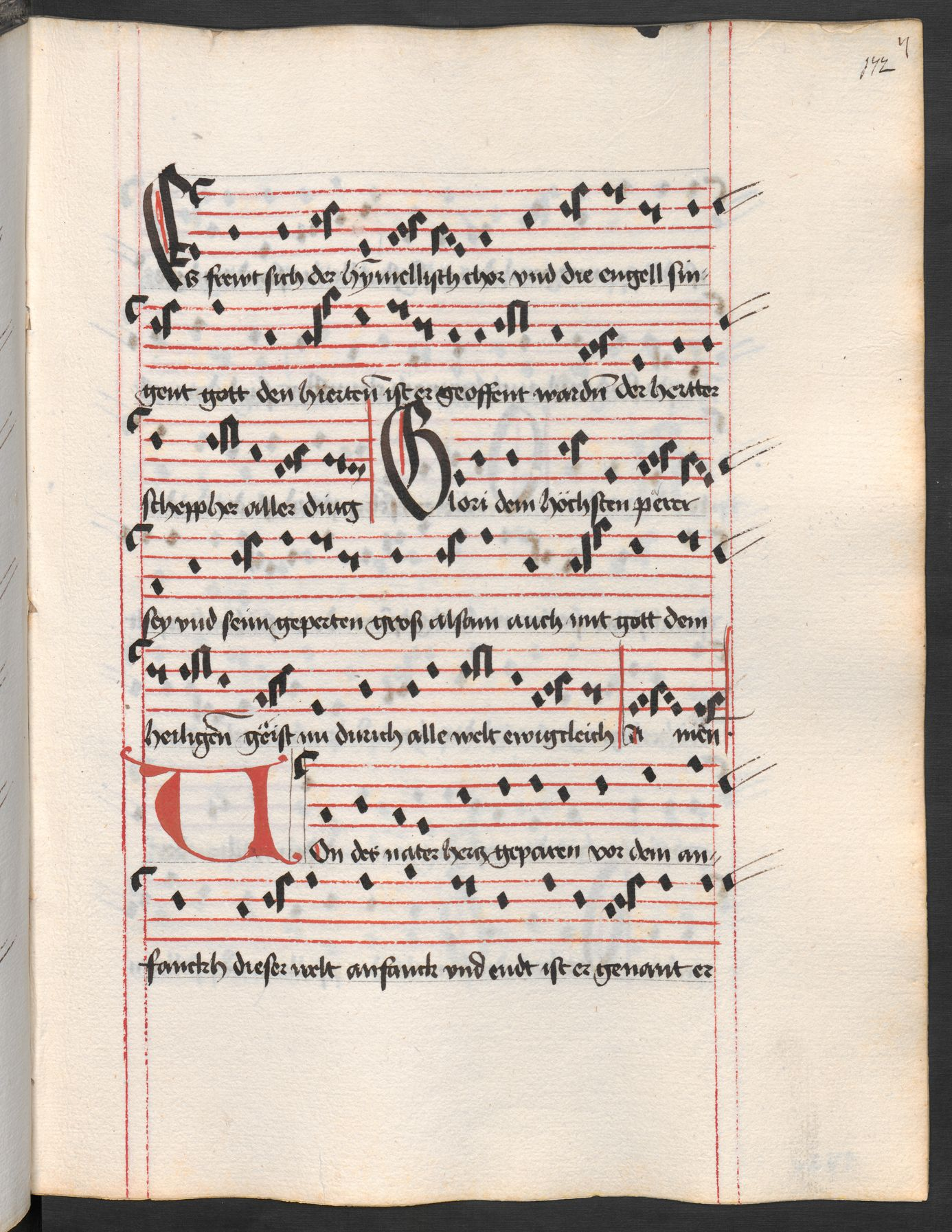
Page 4 of A solis in German breviary

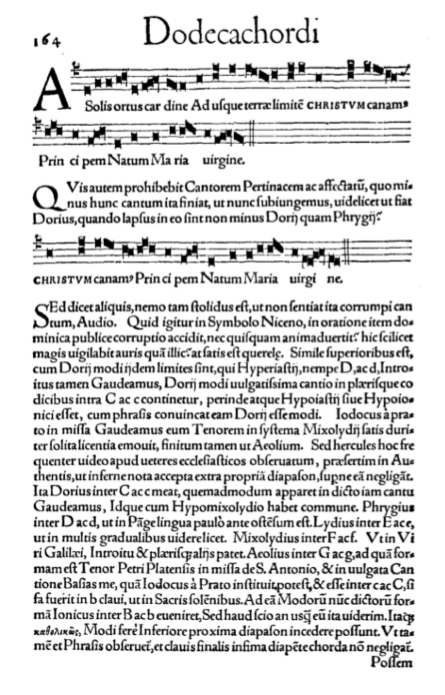
A solis in Glarean's Dodecachordon. Basel 1547

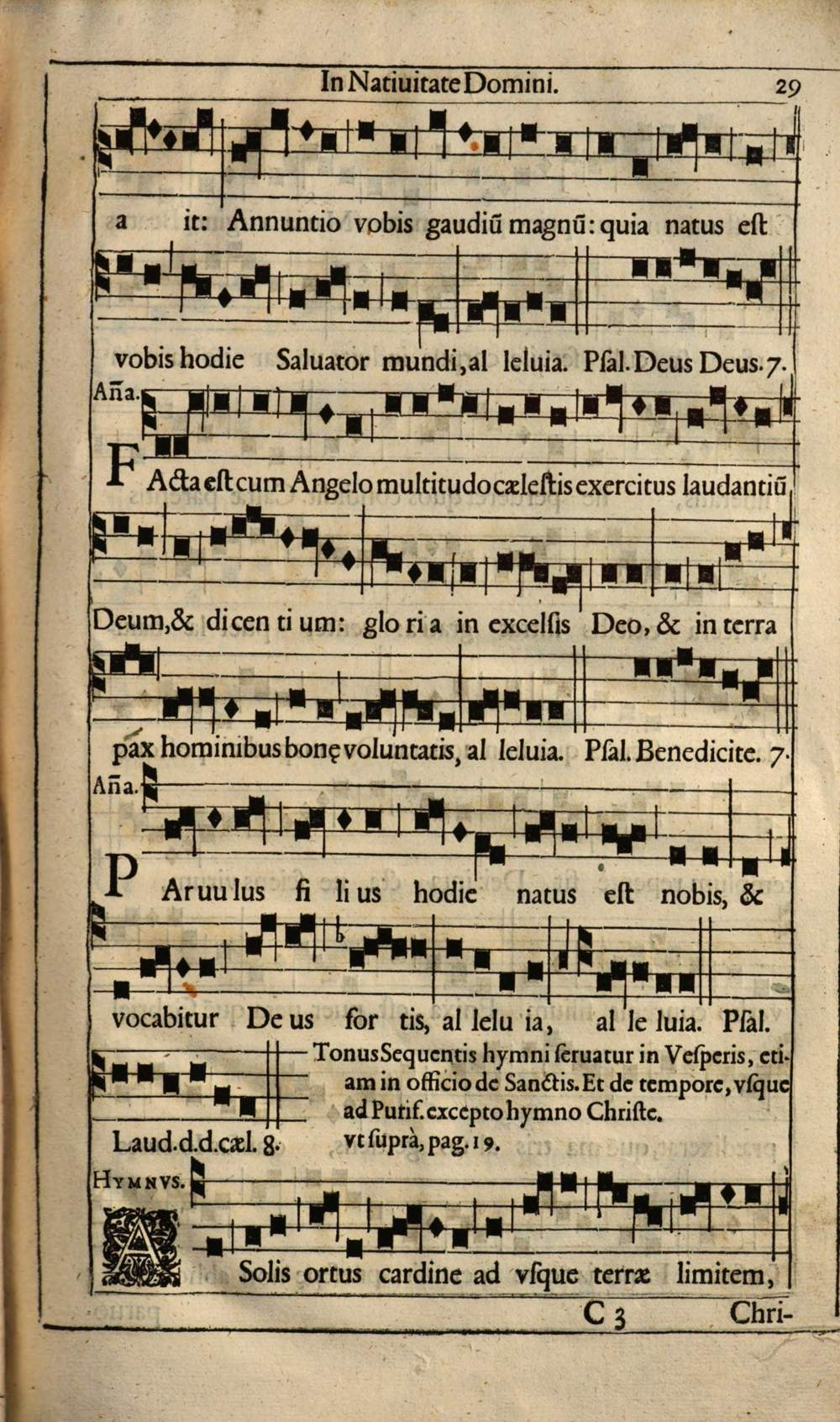
Page 1 of A solis in Antiphonarium, Ingolstadt 1618

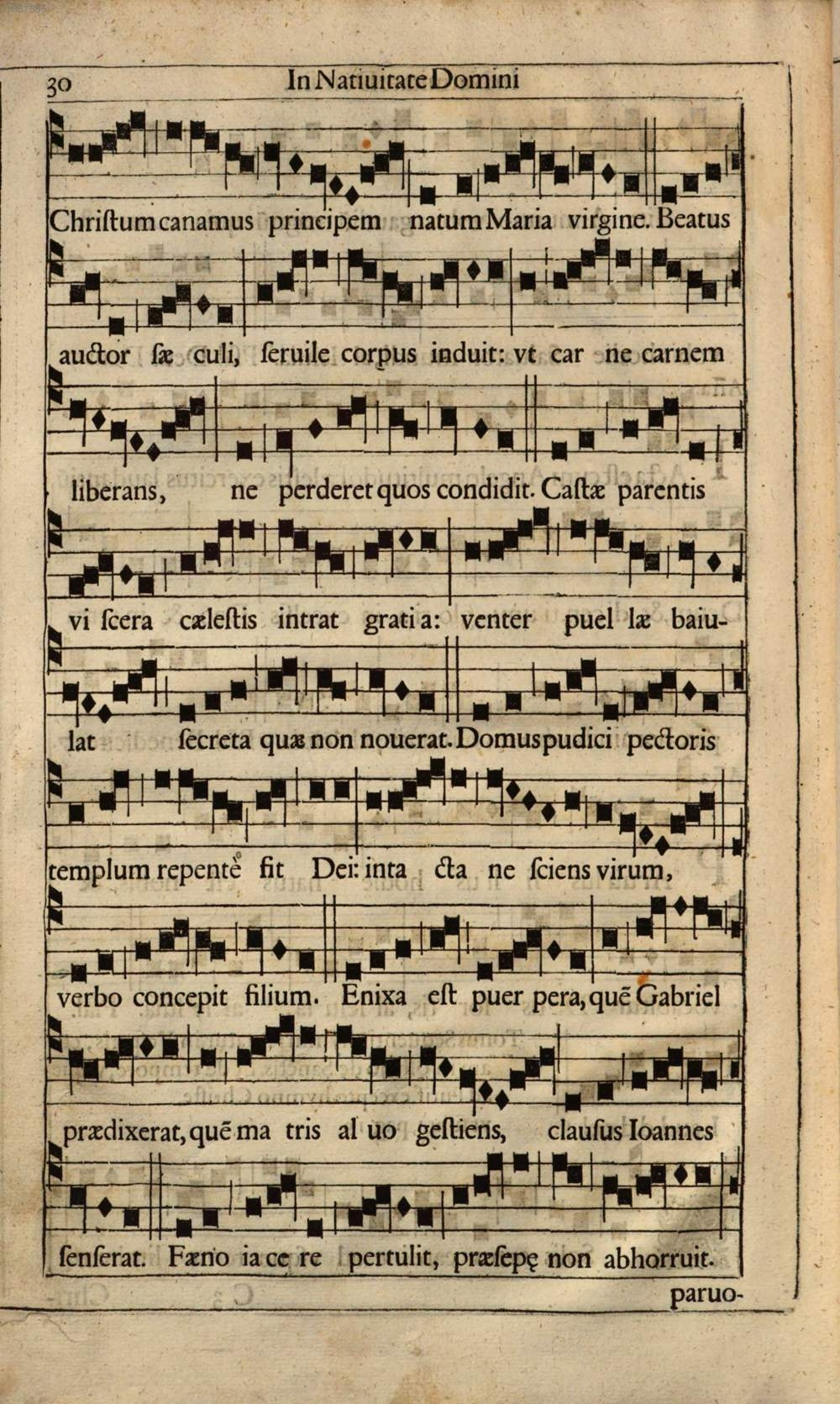
Page 2 of A solis in Antiphonarium

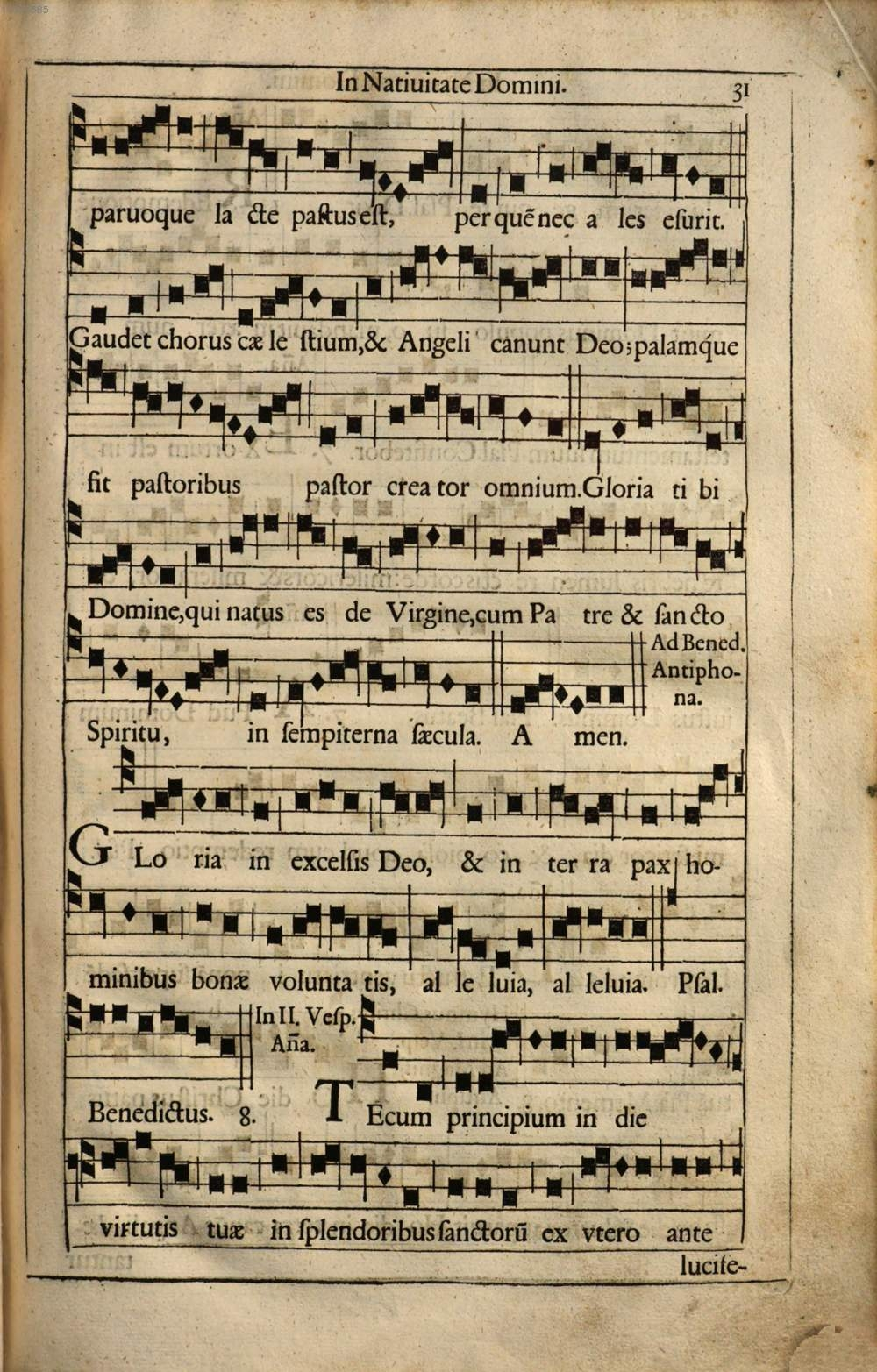
Page 3 of A solis in Antiphonarium

== See also ==
- List of hymns by Martin Luther
