= Erhalt uns, Herr, bei deinem Wort, BWV 126 =

Chorale cantata by Johann Sebastian Bach

Erhalt uns, Herr, bei deinem Wort
- BWV 126
- Chorale cantata by J. S. Bach
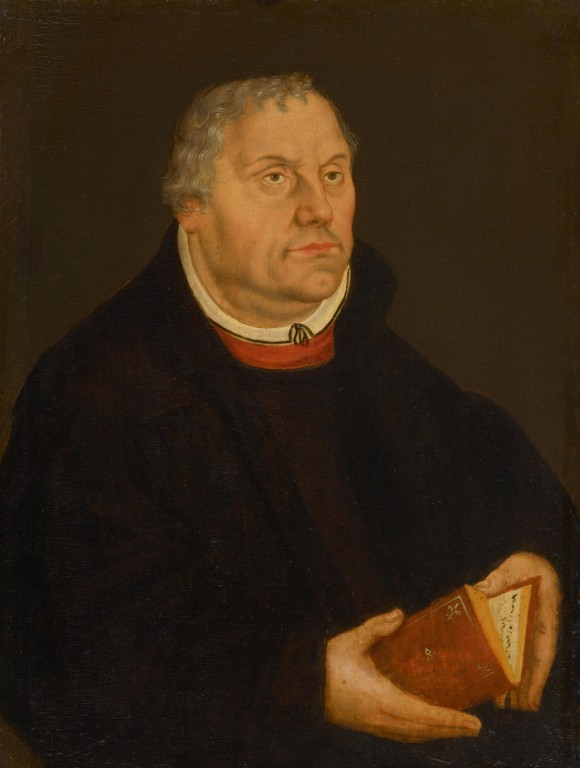
- Martin Luther, author of four stanzas of the hymn, by Lucas Cranach the Elder
- Occasion: Sexagesimae
- Chorale: "Erhalt uns, Herr, bei deinem Wort"
- Performed: 4 February 1725: Leipzig
- Movements: 6
- Vocal: SATB choir; solo: alto, tenor and bass
- Instrumental: trumpet; 2 oboes; 2 violins; viola; continuo

Erhalt uns, Herr, bei deinem Wort (Sustain us, Lord with your word), BWV 126, is a cantata by Johann Sebastian Bach for use in a Lutheran service. He composed the chorale cantata in 1725 in Leipzig for the Sunday Sexagesimae, the second Sunday before Lent, and first performed it on 4 February 1725. It is based on the hymn "Erhalt uns, Herr, bei deinem Wort" by Martin Luther, published in 1542. The hymn text at Bach's time also included two stanzas by Justus Jonas and Luther's "Verleih uns Frieden gnädiglich".

An unknown librettist retained four of these seven combined stanzas, using the first and the two last unchanged as customary, and expanding the third by adding text for a recitative. He paraphrased the other stanzas for two arias and another recitative. Bach structured the cantata in six movements and scored it for three vocal soloists, a four-part choir and a Baroque instrumental ensemble of trumpet, oboe, strings and continuo. The first movement is a chorale fantasia dominated by the trumpet. In the unusual third movement, Bach has an alto and a tenor voice alternate for the recitative, while they sing the lines from the third hymn stanza in a duet. The fourth movement is a dramatic bass aria, accompanied by a restless continuo. Due to the compiled hymns, the melody of the closing two stanzas is different from the one used in movements 1 and 3.

== History, hymn and words ==
Bach held the position of Thomaskantor (director of church music) in Leipzig from 1723. During his first year, beginning with the first Sunday after Trinity, he wrote a cycle of cantatas for the occasions of the liturgical year. In his second year he composed a second annual cycle of cantatas, which was planned to consist exclusively of chorale cantatas, each based on one Lutheran hymn.

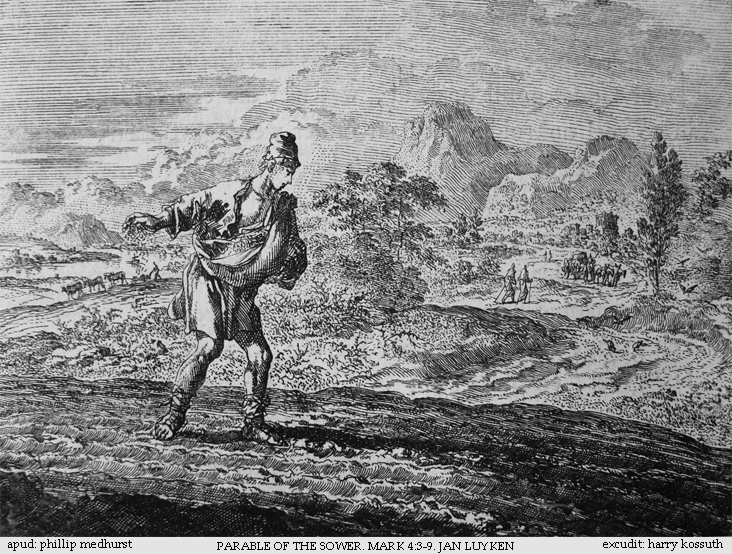
Parable of the Sower, the topic of the prescribed gospel, etching by Jan Luyken

As part of this cycle, Bach composed Erhalt uns, Herr, bei deinem Wort for Sexagesima, the second Sunday before Lent. The prescribed readings for the Sunday were taken from the Second Epistle to the Corinthians, "God's power is mighty in the weak" (2 Corinthians 11:19–12:9), and from the Gospel of Luke, the parable of the Sower (Luke 8:4–15). The cantata is based on the hymn "Erhalt uns, Herr, bei deinem Wort" by Martin Luther. At Bach's time, it included the three stanzas of Luther's chorale, followed by two stanzas of Justus Jonas, Luther's German version of Da pacem Domine (Give peace, Lord, 1531), and a second stanza to it, paraphrasing 1 Timothy 2:2 (1566).

The result are seven stanzas:

1. Erhalt uns, Herr, bei deinem Wort
2. Beweis dein Macht, Herr Jesu Christ
3. Gott Heilger Geist, du Tröster wert
4. Ihr' Anschläg, Herr, zunichte mach
5. So werden sie erkennen doch
6. Verleih uns Frieden gnädiglich
7. Gib unserm Fürsten und aller Obrigkeit

A line in the epistle, "For the word of God is quick and powerful, and sharper than any two-edged sword" (Hebrews 4:12), possibly prompted the choice of the hymn. The unknown poet of the cantata text kept stanzas 1, 3, 6 and 7 unchanged, expanding 3 by recitative, and reworded 2, 4 and 5 for the respective movements of the cantata. The topic of the gospel is God's word, as Jesus explains in verse 11, "Now the parable is this: The seed is the word of God.", which is mentioned in the first line of the hymn, "bei deinem Wort" (close to your word). Instead of relating closely to the parable, the poet concentrates on a general request to God: to keep his people faithful to his word, to protect them from enemies and to provide peace.

Bach first performed the cantata on 4 February 1725, only two days after the cantata Mit Fried und Freud ich fahr dahin, BWV 125, for the Purification of Mary on 2 February. The autograph of the cantata is lost, but the parts which Bach used are extant. The cantata is the third-to-last chorale cantata in Bach's second cantata cycle.

== Music ==
=== Structure and scoring ===
Bach structured the cantata in six movements. In the typical format of Bach's chorale cantatas, the first and last movement on the first and stanza of the hymn are set for choir, as a chorale fantasia and a closing chorale. They frame alternating arias and recitatives with the librettist's text. Bach scored the work for three vocal soloists (alto (A), tenor (T) and bass (B)), a four-part choir, and a Baroque instrumental ensemble: trumpet (Tr), two oboes (Ob), two violins (Vl), viola (Va), and basso continuo (Bc). The duration of the piece has been stated as 22 minutes.

In the following table of the movements, the scoring follows the Neue Bach-Ausgabe. The keys and time signatures are taken from Alfred Dürr, using the symbol for common time (4/4). The instruments are shown separately for winds and strings, while the continuo, playing throughout, is not shown.

Movements of Erhalt uns, Herr, bei deinem Wort
No.	Title	Text	Type	Vocal	Winds	Strings	Key	Time
1	Erhalt uns, Herr, bei deinem Wort	Luther	Chorale fantasia	SATB	Tr 2Ob	2Vl Va	A minor	common time
2	Sende deine Macht von oben	anon.	Aria	T	2Ob		E minor	common time
3	Der Menschen Gunst und Macht wird wenig nützen; Gott Heiliger Geist, du Tröster wert	anon.; Luther	Recitative e chorale	A T				common time
4	Stürze zu Boden, schwülstige Stolze!	anon.	Aria	B			C major	3/8
5	So wird dein Wort und Wahrheit offenbar	anon.	Recitative	T				common time
6	Verleih uns Frieden gnädiglich; Gib unsern Fürsten und all'r Obrigkeit	Luther	Chorale	SATB	Tr 2Ob	2Vl Va	A minor	common time

=== Movements ===
==== 1 ====
The opening chorus, "Erhalt uns, Herr, bei deinem Wort" (Sustain us, Lord with your word,), is a chorale fantasia. A characteristic feature of the instrumental concerto is a four-note trumpet signal, which is derived from the beginning of the chorale melody, as if to repeat the words "Erhalt uns, Herr" (Sustain us, Lord) again and again. The motif consists of the three notes of the A minor chord in the sequence A C A E, with the higher notes on the stressed syllables, the highest one on "Herr". The cantus firmus of the chorale is sung by the soprano, while the other voices sing in imitation, embedded in the independent concerto of the orchestra. The Bach scholar Christoph Wolff notes that the trumpet fanfare "underlines the combative, dogmatic character of this late devotional song of Luther's".

==== 2 ====
The first aria, sung by the tenor, "Sende deine Macht von oben" (Send Your power from above), is a prayer, intensified by two oboes. In the middle section the words "erfreuen" (delight) and "zerstreuen" (scatter) are illustrated by runs in the voice.

==== 3 ====
Movement 3 presents two text elements interwoven, the recitative "Der Menschen Gunst und Macht wird wenig nützen" (The wish and will of mankind are of little use), and the interspersed four lines of the hymn's third stanza, "Gott, Heiliger Geist, du Tröster wert" (God, Holy Spirit, worthy Comforter). The recitative lines are sung by alternating voices alto and tenor, while the interspersed chorale lines are rendered by both voices in duet. In this duet, the voice that enters sings the embellished hymn tune, while the other accompanies.

==== 4 ====
The second aria, "Stürze zu Boden, schwülstige Stolze!" (Hurl to the ground the pompous proud!), is dramatic, especially in the restless continuo. John Eliot Gardiner quotes William G. Whittaker: Bach’s "righteous indignation at the enemies of his faith was never expressed more fiercely than in this aria". The Bach scholar Alfred Dürr describes the movement as an "aria of genuinely baroque dramatic force", expressing "Old Testament zeal".

==== 5 ====
A tenor recitative, "So wird dein Wort und Wahrheit offenbar" (Thus Your word and truth will be revealed), changes the topic and leads to peace, implored in the final movement.

==== 6 ====
Movement 6 combines two stanzas from different chorales, Luther's "Verleih uns Frieden gnädiglich" (Grant us peace graciously), and Walter's "Gib unsern Fürsten und all'r Obrigkeit Fried und gut Regiment" (Give our rulers and all lawgivers peace and good government), in a four-part setting. These two stanzas have different melodies.

== Recordings ==
The selection is taken from the listing on the Bach-Cantatas website. Instrumental groups playing period instruments in historically informed performances are highlighted green under the header "Instr.".

Recordings of Erhalt uns, Herr, bei deinem Wort
Title	Conductor / Choir / Orchestra	Soloists	Label	Year	Instr.
J. S. Bach: Cantatas BWV 126 & BWV 149	Wolfgang Gönnenwein Süddeutscher Madrigalchor Consortium Musicum	Janet Baker; Theo Altmeyer; Hans Sotin	EMI	1967	
Bach Cantatas Vol. 2 – Easter	Karl Richter Münchener Bach-Chor Münchener Bach-Orchester	Anna Reynolds; Peter Schreier; Theo Adam	Archiv Produktion	1974	
Die Bach Kantate Vol. 27	Helmuth Rilling Gächinger Kantorei Bach-Collegium Stuttgart	Helen Watts; Adalbert Kraus; Wolfgang Schöne	Hänssler	1980	
J. S. Bach: Das Kantatenwerk • Complete Cantatas • Les Cantates, Folge / Vol. 5	Nikolaus Harnoncourt: Tölzer Knabenchor; Collegium Vocale Gent; Concentus Musicus Wien	Paul Esswood; Kurt Equiluz; Thomas Thomaschke	Teldec	1980	Period
Bach Cantatas Vol. 20: Naarden / Southwell	John Eliot Gardiner Monteverdi Choir English Baroque Soloists	Robin Tyson; James Gilchrist; Stephan Loges	Archiv Produktion	2000	Period
Bach Edition Vol. 21 – Cantatas Vol. 12	Pieter Jan Leusink Holland Boys Choir Netherlands Bach Collegium	Sytse Buwalda; Knut Schoch; Bas Ramselaar	Brilliant Classics	2000	Period
J. S. Bach: Complete Cantatas Vol. 14	Ton Koopman Amsterdam Baroque Orchestra & Choir	Franziska Gottwald; Paul Agnew; Klaus Mertens	Antoine Marchand	2000	Period
J. S. Bach: Cantatas Vol. 34 – BWV 111, 123, 124, 125	Masaaki Suzuki Bach Collegium Japan	Robin Blaze; Gerd Türk; Peter Kooy	BIS	2005	Period

== Bibliography ==
Scores

- Erhalt uns, Herr, bei deinem Wort, BWV 126: Scores at the International Music Score Library Project
- "Erhalt uns, Herr, bei deinem Wort BWV 126; BC A 46 / Chorale cantata (Sexagesima)". Bach digital website, managed by Bach Archive, SLUB, SBB and Leipzig University. 2016.

Books

- Dürr, Alfred (2006). "Erhalt uns, Herr, bei deinem Wort, BWV 126". The Cantatas of J. S. Bach: With Their Librettos in German-English Parallel Text. Translated by Richard D. P. Jones. Oxford University Press. ISBN 978-0-19-929776-4.
- Wollschläger, Karin (2012). "Erhalt uns, Herr, bei deinem Wort, BWV 126" (PDF). Stuttgarter Bach-Ausgaben · Urtext. Carus-Verlag.

Online sources

- Bischof, Walter F. (2010). "BWV 126 Erhalt uns, Herr, bei deinem Wort". University of Alberta.
- Dellal, Pamela (2012). "BWV 126 – Erhalt uns, Herr, bei deinem Wort". Emmanuel Music.
- Gardiner, John Eliot (2009). Johann Sebastian Bach (1685-1750) / Cantatas Nos 18, 84, 92, 126, 144 & 181 (Media notes). Soli Deo Gloria (at Hyperion Records website).
- Mincham, Julian (2010). "Chapter 39 BWV 126 Erhalt uns, Herr, bei deinem Wort / Let your word protect us, Lord". jsbachcantatas.com.
- Oron, Aryeh (2016). "Cantata BWV 126 Erhalt uns, Herr, bei deinem Wort". Bach-Cantatas.
- Wolff, Christoph (2001). "Conclusion of the second yearly cycle (1724–25) of the Leipzig church cantatas" (PDF). Bach-Cantatas.
- "XXXIII.: Erhalt uns, Herr, bei deinem Wort. Lord, keep us in Thy Word and Work. - Martin Luther, The Hymns of Martin Luther 1884". libertyfund.org. 2011.
