= Thomas Thomaschke =

German bass singer in opera and concert (born 1943)

- Born: 2 August 1943 (age 82); Pirna, Germany
- Education: Hochschule für Musik Carl Maria von Weber, Dresden
- Occupations: Classical bass singer; Academic teacher

Thomas Thomaschke (born 2 August 1943) is a German bass singer in opera and concert. He has appeared in parts such as Hunding in Wagner's Die Walküre and Sarastro in Mozart's Die Zauberflöte in major opera houses in Europe and international festivals. He has also performed and recorded oratorios and cantatas.

== Career ==
Born in Pirna, he first studied the horn, then voice with Harry Schwickardi at the Hochschule für Musik Carl Maria von Weber in Dresden. He made his debut in 1965 at the Stadttheater Freiberg as the sacristan in Puccini's Tosca. From 1970, he was a member of the Leipzig Opera, singing also at the Semperoper and the Komische Oper Berlin.

He took part in premieres, including in 1969 performing in the Dresden premiere of the opera Maître Pathelin oder Die Hammelkomödie by Rainer Kunad, and in 1976 Josef Tal's Die Versuchung at the Bavarian State Opera. From 1977 he was a member of the Cologne Opera.

He appeared at major European opera houses as a guest, including the National Theatre in Prague, the National Theatre Brno, at La Scala in Milan, where he made his debut in 1974 as Hunding in Wagner's Die Walküre, at the Teatro La Fenice in Venice and at the festival Internationale Maifestspiele Wiesbaden. In both 1978 and 1980, he appeared at the Glyndebourne Festival as Sarastro in Mozart's Die Zauberflöte.

In concert, Thomaschke sang in 1975 at the Vienna Festival the bass part in Beethoven's Missa solemnis. He performed Ein Deutsches Requiem by Brahms and Haydn's Die Schöpfung. In 1975 he recorded Bach's Mass in B minor with the Dresdner Kreuzchor, conducted by Martin Flämig. He recorded Bach cantatas with Nikolaus Harnoncourt in 1982, including Mit Fried und Freud ich fahr dahin, BWV 125.

He taught voice at the Musikhochschule Lübeck and in master classes.

== Awards ==
In 1971 Thomaschke was awarded a prize at the International Vocal Competition 's-Hertogenbosch; he also won honors at another international singing competition in Moscow.

== Selected recordings ==
- Bach: cantatas BWV 124, BWV 125 and BWV 126, with Concentus Musicus Wien, conducted by Nikolaus Harnoncourt
- Handel: Jephtha, with Concentus Musicus Wien conducted by Nikolaus Harnoncourt
- Liszt: Christus
- Mozart: Sarastro in Die Zauberflöte, with London Philharmonic Orchestra conducted by Bernard Haitink
- Wilhelm Petersen: Große Messe
- Weber: Kuno in Der Freischütz, with Sächsische Staatskapelle Dresden conducted by Colin Davis
