= Christum wir sollen loben schon =

Lutheran Christmas hymn

- Hymn by Martin Luther
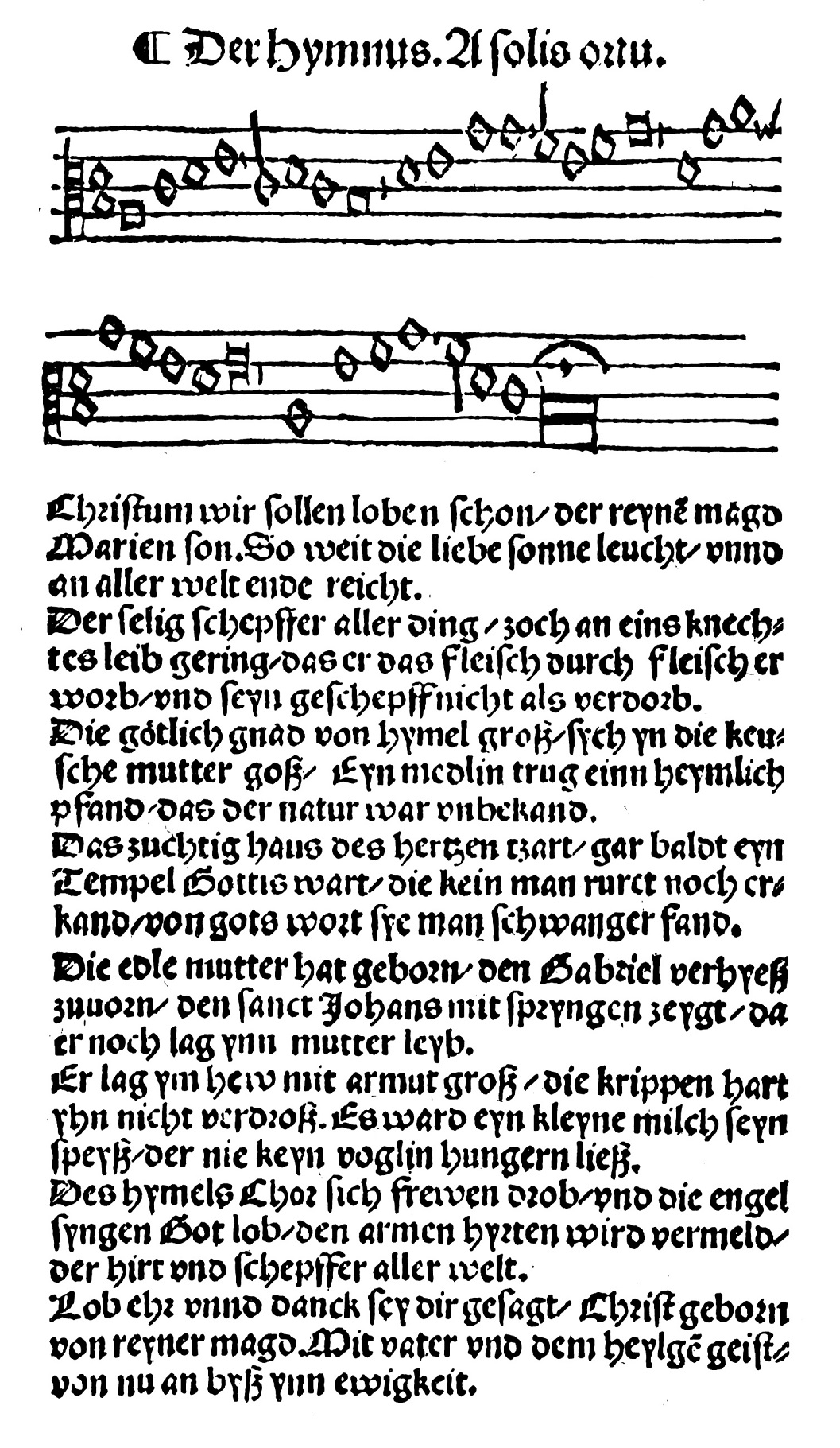
- The hymn in the Erfurt Enchyridion, 1524
- Catalogue: Zahn 297a–c
- Text: by Martin Luther
- Language: German
- Published: 1524

"Christum wir sollen loben schon" (We should praise Christ beautifully (Note: "schon" is an old form of "schön" (beautiful))) is a Lutheran Christmas hymn with a text by Martin Luther, first published in 1524 in the Erfurt Enchiridion. He wrote it based on the Latin A solis ortus cardine and kept its melody (Zahn No. 297a–b).

A variant of the hymn tune, Zahn No. 297c, was published in 1535. The hymn was used in several musical settings, including the chorale cantata by Johann Sebastian Bach, Christum wir sollen loben schon, BWV 121. Bach wrote an organ chorale prelude BWV 611 for his Orgelbüchlein.

The tune is also used for "From East to West, from Shore to Shore."

== Literature ==
- Wilhelm Lucke: Christum wir sollen loben schon. In: D. Martin Luthers Werke. Kritische Gesamtausgabe, vol 35, Weimar 1923, S. 150–151
- Ingeborg Weber-Kellermann: Das Buch der Weihnachtslieder. Atlantis-Musikbuch-Verlag, Zürich 2003 (1982), ISBN 3-254-08213-3.
