= Christum wir sollen loben schon, BWV 121 =

1724 church cantata by Johann Sebastian Bach

Christum wir sollen loben schon
- BWV 121
- Christmas cantata; Chorale cantata; by J. S. Bach
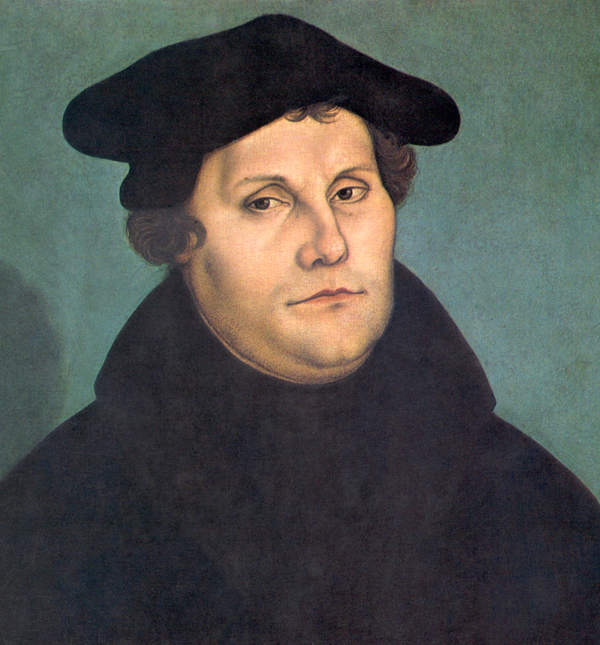
- Martin Luther, author of the hymn
- Occasion: Second Day of Christmas
- Chorale: "Christum wir sollen loben schon" by Martin Luther
- Performed: 26 December 1724: Leipzig
- Movements: 6
- Vocal: SATB soloists and choir
- Instrumental: cornett; 3 trombones; oboe d'amore; 2 violins; viola; continuo

Christum wir sollen loben schon (Christ we shall praise splendidly), (Note: "schon" = "schön" (beautiful)) BWV 121, is a church cantata by Johann Sebastian Bach. He composed this Christmas cantata in Leipzig in 1724 for the second day of Christmas and first performed it on 26 December 1724. It is based on a hymn by Martin Luther, "Christum wir sollen loben schon", a 1524 translation of the Latin "A solis ortus cardine" hymn from the 5th century.

The cantata is part of Bach's chorale cantata cycle, the second cycle during his tenure as Thomaskantor that began in 1723. In the format of this cycle, the text retains the first and last stanza of the chorale unchanged, while the inner six stanzas were paraphrased by an unknown librettist for alternating arias and recitatives. The librettist created a sermon about the miracle of the birth of Jesus and the believer's reaction to it. The work's outer movements are choral and use the hymn tune, while the inner four movements are composed for soloists, unconnected to the hymn tune. The cantata is scored for four vocal soloists, a four-part choir, and a Baroque instrumental ensemble of cornett and trombones to reinforce the voices, oboe d'amore, strings, and basso continuo.

== History, hymn and words ==
Bach composed the cantata in his second year in Leipzig for the Second Day of Christmas as part of his second cantata cycle. The prescribed readings for the feast day were from the Epistle to Titus (Titus 3:4–7), and the Gospel of Luke (Luke 2:15–20), of the shepherds at the manger.

The source for the text is Martin Luther's hymn "Christum wir sollen loben schon", a German translation of the Latin "A solis ortus cardine", c. 430. Luther's version, with a tune based on the Latin hymn, appeared first in the Erfurt Enchiridion in 1524. The hymn's first stanza and eighth stanza are retained unchanged for an opening chorus and a closing chorale. The inner stanzas were freely adapted as madrigalian recitatives and arias by an unknown poet, one stanza for each of the two arias, movements 2 and 4, and two stanzas for each of the two recitatives, movements 3 and 5. The librettist created a sermon in versed poetry, devoting the first three free movements to the miracle of the birth of Jesus and the other three to the believer's reaction to it.

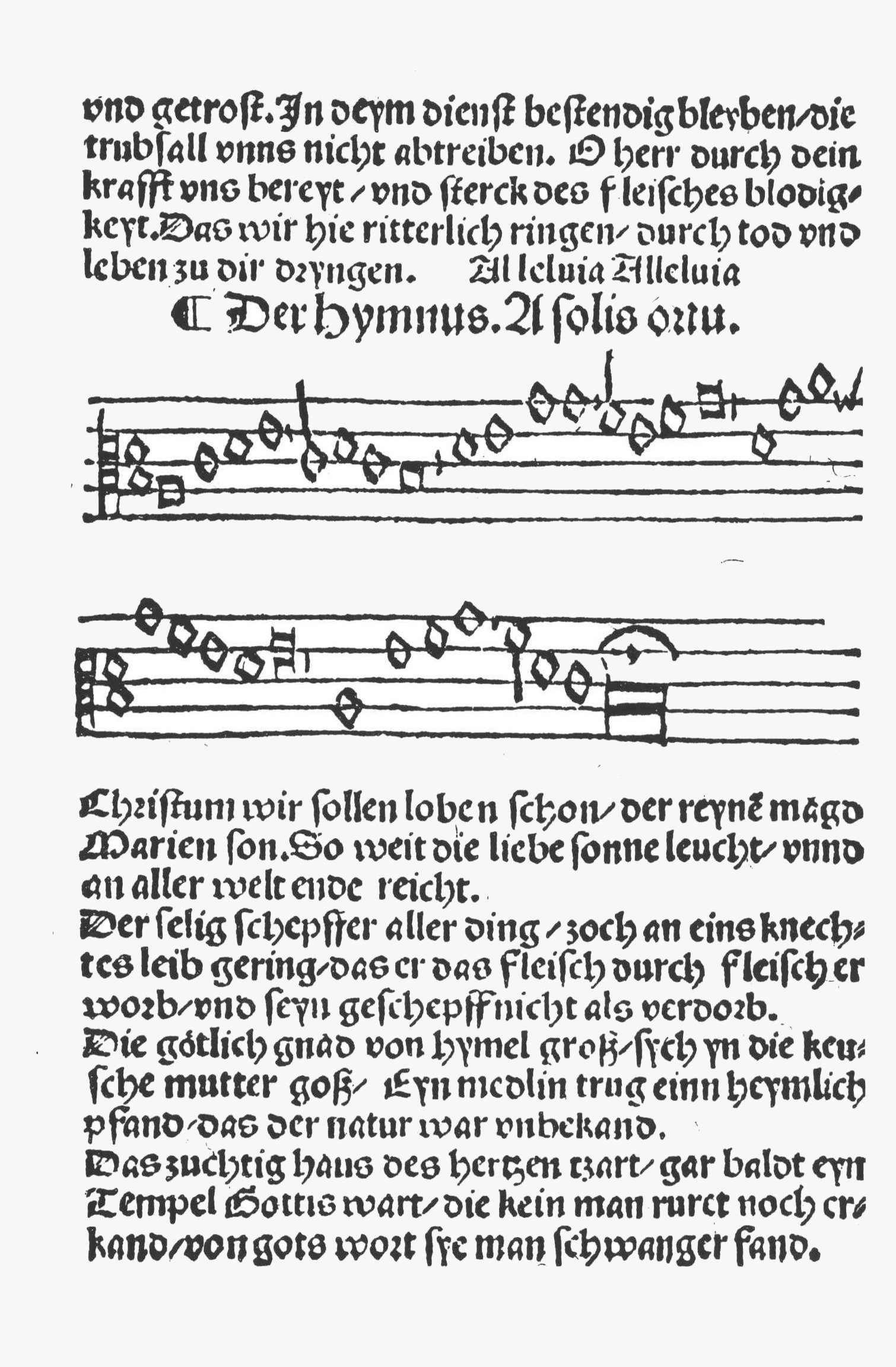
Luther's version of A solis ortus cardine, 1524

The hymn tune that Bach used goes back to the "A solis ortus cardine" hymn from the 5th century. Bach's version was first published in Strasbourg in 1537.

Bach led the first performance in the service on 26 December 1724.

== Music ==
=== Structure and scoring ===
Bach structured Christum wir sollen loben schon in six movements. Both the text and the tune of the hymn are retained in the outer movements, a chorale fantasia and a four-part closing chorale. Bach scored the work for four vocal soloists (soprano (S), alto (A), tenor (T) and bass (B)), a four-part choir, and a Baroque instrumental ensemble of cornett (Ct), three trombones (Tb), oboe d'amore (Oa), two violin parts (Vl), one viola part (Va), and basso continuo. The duration of the cantata is given as 21 minutes.

In the following table of the movements, the scoring, keys and time signatures are taken from Alfred Dürr's standard work Die Kantaten von Johann Sebastian Bach. The continuo, which plays throughout, is not shown.

Movements
Movement	Title	Text	Type	Vocal	Brass	Winds	Strings	Key	Time
1	Christum wir sollen loben schon	Luther	Chorale fantasia	SATB	Ct 3Tb	Oa	2Vl Va	E minor	cut time
2	O du von Gott erhöhte Kreatur	anon.	Aria	T		Oa		B minor	3/8
3	Der Gnade unermesslich's Wesen	Moller, anon.	Recitative	A					common time
4	Johannis freudenvolles Springen	anon.	Aria	B			2Vl Va	C major	common time
5	Doch wie erblickt es dich in deiner Krippe	Moller, anon.	Recitative	S					common time
6	Lob, Ehr und Danke sei dir gesagt	Luther	Chorale	SATB	Ct 3Tb	Oa	2Vl Va	E minor	common time

=== Movements ===
The opening choral motet, "Christum wir sollen loben schon" (Christ we shall praise splendidly), is built on a quasi-church mode cantus firmus in the soprano. The archaic effect of the tune is underscored by a full four-part brass accompaniment. The instruments, other than the continuo, largely double the vocal lines, while the continuo assumes an obbligato contrapuntal role. Bach used fugal techniques and an extended final cadence. The movement begins in E minor and, unusually, closes a tone higher in F-sharp minor.

The tenor aria, "O du von Gott erhöhte Kreatur, begreife nicht, nein, nein, bewundre nur" (O you exalted creature of God, do not understand, no, no, just marvel), is composed as a modern da capo aria, in which the symmetrical scheme is broken up by irregular periodising and harmonization. It includes a very prominent oboe d'amore part. The movement is largely in B minor. Craig Smith remarks that the aria is "marvelously off-kilter".

The third movement, "Der Gnade unermeßlich's Wesen" (The unfathomable being of Grace), is an alto recitative. It ends with a "startling enharmonic progression – a symbolic transformation" to C major, instead of the expected F-sharp minor, to illustrate the closing words about the wonder of the birth of Jesus.

The bass aria, "Johannis freudenvolles Springen erkannte dich, mein Jesu, schon" (John's joyful leaping recognized You, my Jesus, already), is almost dance-like, portraying jumps, reflecting the movement's references to John the Baptist leaping in his mother's womb during the Visitation of Mary. In the middle section, the text speaks of holding the baby, ready to leave the world, in an allusion to Simeon that goes beyond Luther's text. The binary-form string ritornello repeats four times during the aria, framing three separate vocal sections of the da capo aria.

The penultimate movement, "Doch wie erblickt es dich in deiner Krippe?" (Yet how can it behold you in your manger?), is a soprano recitative, short and arioso-like. It is remarkable for its extended range.

The closing chorale movement presents the doxology, "Lob, Ehr und Danke sei dir gesagt, Christ, geborn von der reinen Magd" (Praise, honor, and thanks be said to you, Christ, born from the pure maid), in a four-part setting. The early-church melody is illuminated in a modern major-minor tonality. Unusually, the piece ends on a B minor imperfect cadence (a "half cadence" in American English).

== Manuscripts and publication ==
Bach's autograph score is preserved. It was probably inherited by his son Wilhelm Friedemann Bach, and went, via other owners, to the royal library in Berlin, together with four parts. While the parts remained there, the score was moved during World War II. It is held in the Biblioteka Jagiellońska in Kraków, Poland. A set of 14 original parts was probably inherited by Anna Magdalena Bach who passed them to the Thomasschule. They are now held by the Bach Archive in Leipzig.

The cantata was first published in a critical edition in 1878 in the first complete edition of Bach's work, the Bach-Gesellschaft Ausgabe. The volume in question was edited by Alfred Dörffel. It was published in 2000 in the Neue Bach-Ausgabe, edited by Uwe Wolf.

== Recordings ==
A list of recordings is provided on the Bach Cantatas website.

Recordings
Title	Ensembles, conductor	Soloists	Label	Year
J. S. Bach: Das Kantatenwerk • Complete Cantatas • Les Cantates, Folge / Vol. 1	Münchener Bach-Chor; Münchener Bach-Orchester; Karl Richter, conductor	Edith Mathis; Anna Reynolds; Peter Schreier; Dietrich Fischer-Dieskau	Arkiv Produktion	1972
J. S. Bach: Das Kantatenwerk • Complete Cantatas • Les Cantates, Folge / Vol. 30	Tölzer Knabenchor; Concentus Musicus Wien; Nikolaus Harnoncourt, conductor	Markus Huber (soloist of; the Vienna Boys' Choir); Paul Esswood; Kurt Equiluz; Philippe Huttenlocher	Teldec	1980
Die Bach Kantate Vol. 62	Gächinger Kantorei; Bach-Collegium Stuttgart; Helmuth Rilling, conductor	Arleen Auger; Doris Soffel; Adalbert Kraus; Wolfgang Schöne	Hänssler	1980
J. S. Bach: Christmas Cantatas	Monteverdi Choir; English Baroque Soloists; John Eliot Gardiner, conductor	Ann Monoyios; Sara Mingardo; Rufus Müller; Stephan Loges	Arkiv Produktion	1998
Bach Edition Vol. 14 – Cantatas Vol. 7	Holland Boys Choir; Netherlands Bach Collegium; Pieter Jan Leusink, conductor	Ruth Holton; Sytse Buwalda; Knut Schoch; Bas Ramselaar	Brilliant Classics	2000
J. S. Bach: Complete Cantatas Vol. 12	Amsterdam Baroque Orchestra & Choir; Ton Koopman, conductor	Lisa Larsson; Annette Markert; Christoph Prégardien; Klaus Mertens	Erato	2000
J. S. Bach: Cantatas Vol. 31 Cantatas from Leipzig 1724 – BWV BWV 91, 101, 121, 133	Bach Collegium Japan; Masaaki Suzuki, conductor	Yukari Nonoshita; Robin Blaze; Gerd Türk; Peter Kooy	BIS	2004
