= Erhalt uns, Herr, bei deinem Wort =

1541 hymn by Martin Luther

- Hymn by Martin Luther
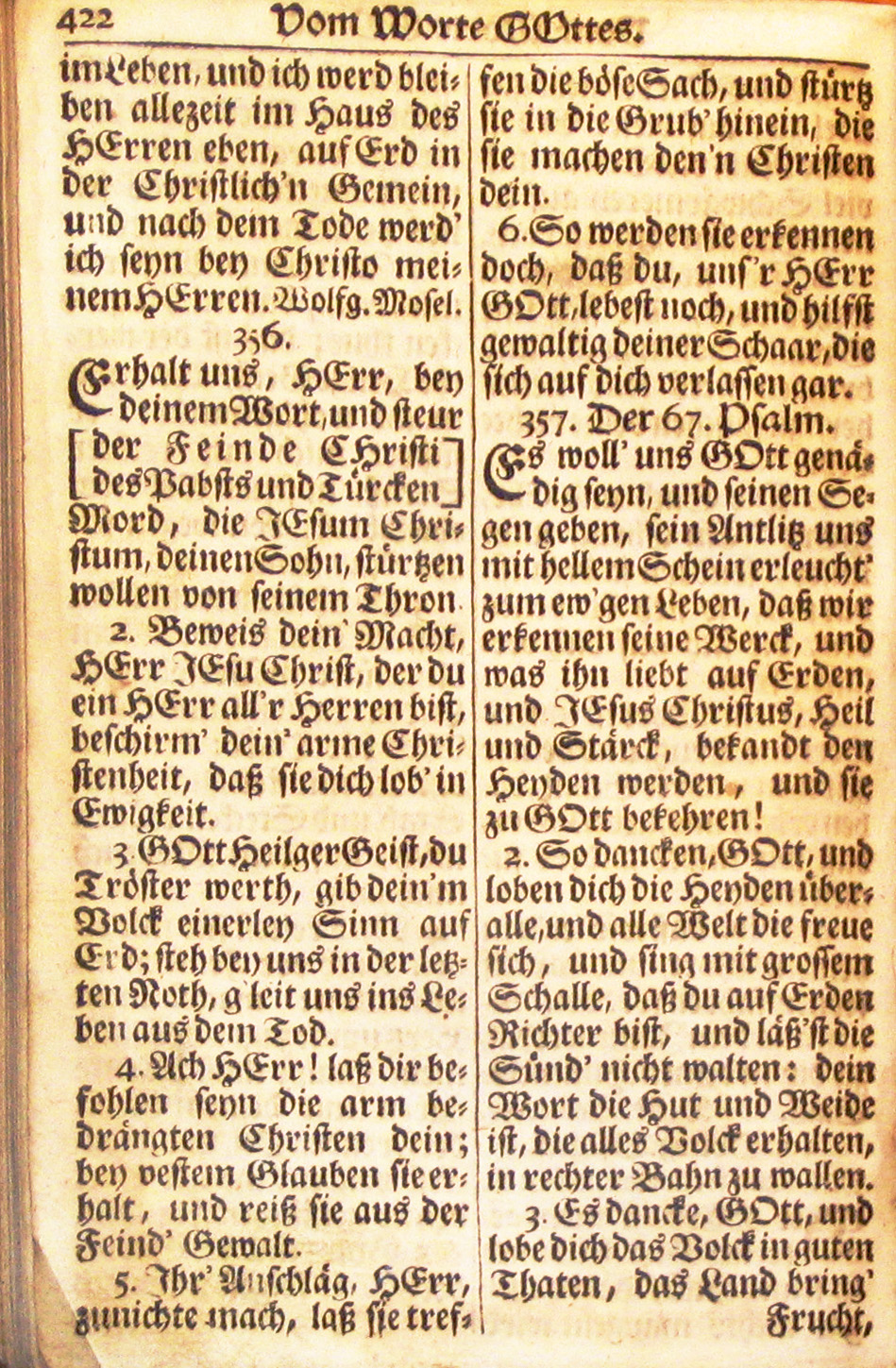
- Six stanzas in the Magdeburg hymnal, 19th century
- English: "Lord, keep us in Thy Word and Work"
- Catalogue: Zahn 350
- Text: by: Martin Luther; Justus Jonas
- Language: German
- Published: 1541
- Melody

"Erhalt uns, Herr, bei deinem Wort" ("Keep us, Lord, faithful to your word" or "Lord, keep us in Thy Word and Work") is a Lutheran hymn by Martin Luther with additional stanzas by Justus Jonas, first published in 1542. It was used in several musical settings, including the chorale cantata by Johann Sebastian Bach, Erhalt uns, Herr, bei deinem Wort, BWV 126.

== History ==
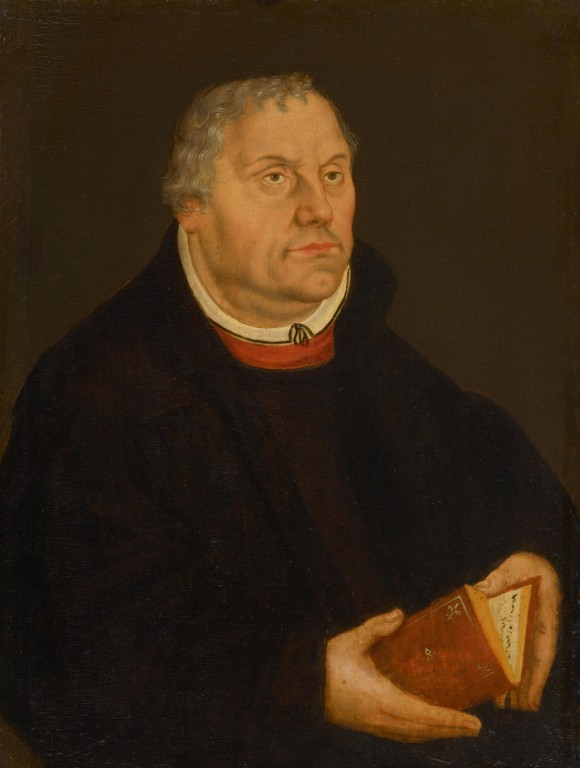
Luther, posthumous painting by Lucas Cranach d. J., 1577

Luther wrote the hymn probably in 1541 when a prayer service was held in Wittenberg against the perceived danger of the Turks when Ferdinand of Austria lost most of Hungary to the Ottoman Empire at Siege of Buda. The second line of the first verse reads "und steur' des Papsts und Türken Mord" (And control the murder by the Pope and Turks). Luther may have contributed the hymn for a boys' choir. It was published as a broadsheet in 1542. In Klug's hymnal Geistliche Lieder it was titled a "A hymn for the children to sing against the two arch-enemies of Christ, and His Holy Church, the Pope and the Turks" ("Ein Kinderlied, zu singen wider die zween Ertzfeinde Christi und seiner heiligen Kirchen, den Bapst und Türcken"). Luther wrote three stanzas, each one related to a person of the Trinity: "Erhalt uns, Herr", "Beweis dein Macht, Herr Jesu Christ", and "Gott, Heilger Geist". More stanzas were added in later editions, most prominently by Justus Jonas, who wrote probably in 1545, referring to the Council of Trent, two more stanzas, "Ihr Anschläg, Herr, zu nichte mach" and "So werden wir erkennen doch". These five stanzas appeared in Breslau in 1546 as No. 723 in Burg's hymnal.

In hymnals at the time of Johann Sebastian Bach, "Erhalt uns, Herr, bei deinem Wort" this combination of five stanzas was often continued by Luther's German version of Da pacem Domine (Give peace, Lord, 1531), and a second stanza to it, as follows:

1. Erhalt uns, Herr, bei deinem Wort
2. Beweis dein Macht, Herr Jesu Christ
3. Gott Heilger Geist, du Tröster wert
4. Ihr' Anschläg, Herr, zunichte mach
5. So werden sie erkennen doch
6. Verleih uns Frieden gnädiglich
7. Gib unserm Fürsten und aller Obrigkeit

The sixth stanza is a prayer for peace, beginning "Verleih uns Frieden gnädiglich, Herr Gott, zu unsern Zeiten" (Grant us peace graciously, Lord God, in our time). The seventh stanza paraphrases 1 Timothy 2:2, beginning "Gib unsern Fürsten und all'r Obrigkeit Fried und gut Regiment" (Give our rulers and all lawgivers peace and good government).

In modern editions of "Erhalt uns, Herr, bei deinem Wort", the line against the Pope and the Turks was replaced by a more neutral wording against God's enemies in general. In the current Protestant hymnal Evangelisches Gesangbuch it is EG 193.

== Melody and musical settings ==
Johann Walter adapted the melody, Zahn No. 350, from Da pacem Domine. It appeared first in Klug's hymnal in 1543 and resembles that of "Verleih uns Frieden gnädiglich", derived from the same source. Balthasar Resinarius wrote two choral settings in 1544.

Dieterich Buxtehude composed a cantata, BuxWV 27, on Luther's five stanzas. Bach based in 1725 his chorale cantata Erhalt uns, Herr, bei deinem Wort, BWV 126, on the seven combined stanzas, retaining the text of stanzas 1, 3, 6 and 7 unchanged. Ernst Pepping composed a motet for men's chorus a cappella in 1957.

Chorale preludes were written by Johann Pachelbel, Georg Böhm, and Hugo Distler, among others. Mauricio Kagel quoted the hymn in his oratorio Sankt-Bach-Passion telling Bach's life, composed for the tricentenary of Bach's birth in 1985.

== See also ==
- List of hymns by Martin Luther
- On War Against the Turk, a 1528 book by Martin Luther.

== Literature ==
- Martin Luther, Vom Kriege wider die Türken, WA, 30 II, pp 107–143
- Albert Friedrich Wilhelm Fischer: Kirchenlieder-Lexicon. Gotha 1878
- Johannes Kulp (ed. Arno Büchner and Siegfried Fornaçon): Die Lieder unserer Kirche. Eine Handreichung zum Evangelischen Kirchengesangbuch; Handbuch zum Evangelischen Kirchengesangbuch. Sonderband; Göttingen: Vandenhoeck & Ruprechjt 1958; p. 230–233
- Otto Schlißke, Handbuch der Lutherlieder. Göttingen 1948, p. 124-137
