= Romans 3 =

- ← chapter 2 chapter 4 →
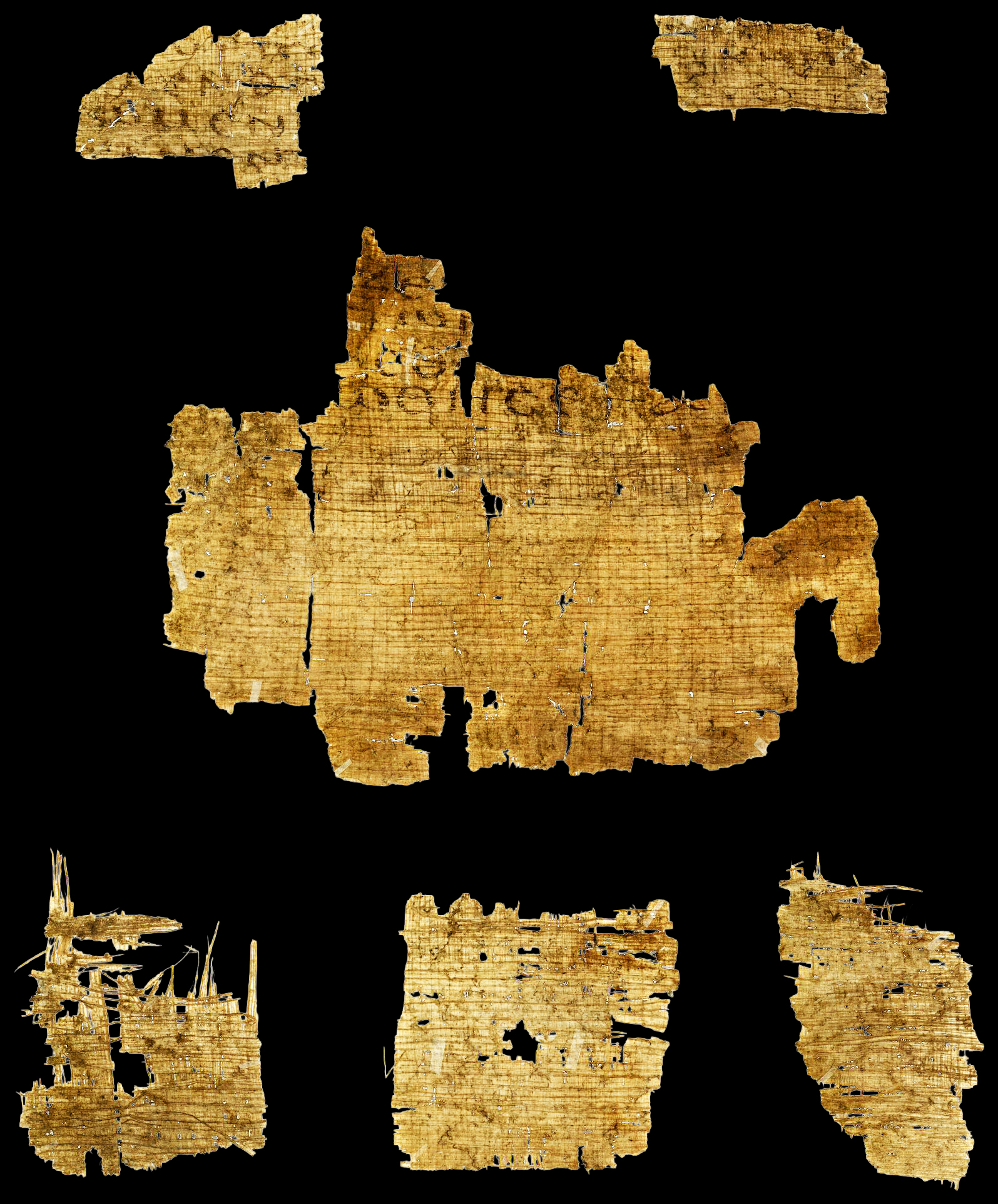
- Fragment c to h containing parts of the Epistle to the Romans in Papyrus 40, written c. AD 250
- Book: Epistle to the Romans
- Category: Pauline epistles
- Christian Bible part: New Testament
- Order in the Christian part: 6

Romans 3 is the third chapter of the Epistle to the Romans in the New Testament of the Christian Bible. It was composed by Paul the Apostle, while he was in Corinth in the mid-50s AD, with the help of an amanuensis (secretary), Tertius, who added his own greeting in Romans 16:22.

In this chapter, Paul asks a series of rhetorical questions in order to develop his theological message, (Note: There are 15 rhetorical questions according to the New International Version translation.) and quotes extensively from the Hebrew Bible. (Note: There are 9 biblical references: see Cross references) Theologian Albert Barnes suggests that "the design of the first part of this chapter is to answer some of the objections which might be offered by a Jew to the statements in the last chapter."

== Text ==
The original text was written in Koine Greek. This chapter is divided into 31 verses.

=== Textual witnesses ===
Some early manuscripts containing the text of this chapter are:

- Papyrus 40 (~AD 250; extant verses 21–31)
- Codex Vaticanus (325–350)
- Codex Sinaiticus (330–360)
- Codex Alexandrinus (400–440)
- Codex Ephraemi Rescriptus (~450; extant verses 22–31)

=== Old Testament references ===
- Romans 3:4 references Psalm 51:4
- Romans 3:10–12 references Psalm 14:1–3, Psalm 53:1–3 and Ecclesiastes 7:20
- Romans 3:13 references Psalm 5:9 and Psalm 140:3
- Romans 3:14 references Psalm 10:7
- Romans 3:17 references Isaiah 59:7–8
- Romans 3:18 references Psalm 36:1
- Romans 3:20 references Psalm 143:2b

== God's righteousness upheld (verses 1–7) ==
In verse 2, the chief advantage, or benefit, or responsibility, or superiority of the Jewish people is their possession of the Hebrew Bible (τα λογια του θεου, ta logia tou theou, 'the very words of God' New International Version). Traditional translations (the Geneva Bible, King James Version, American Standard Version and Revised Standard Version) refer to the "oracles of God".

=== Verse 1 ===
Then what advantage has the Jew? Or what is the value of circumcision?

The first of a Jew's objections is stated here. "A Jew would naturally ask, if the view which the apostle had given were correct, what special benefit could the Jew derive from his religion?" The objection follows from Romans 2:26: if a man who is uncircumcised keeps the requirements of the Law, his uncircumcision will be regarded as circumcision.

=== Verse 2 ===
Much in every way! First of all, the Jews have been entrusted with the very words of God.

— Romans 3:2, New International Version

The Jewish "advantage" (το περισσον, to perisson) is really an act of entrustment. Nonconformist theologian Matthew Poole stated that "to the Jews were credited, or given in custody, the Holy Scriptures". Stephen, whose martyrdom Paul had witnessed before his conversion, called the scriptures the 'living oracles' (λογια ζωντα, logia zōnta). Handley Moule, in the Cambridge Bible for Schools and Colleges, notes that this verse anticipates a more complete summary of the Jewish "advantage" in Romans 9:4, where "the adoption, the glory, the covenants, the giving of the law, the service of God, and the promises" are listed as the inheritance of the Jewish people.

== Slanderous criticisms ==
In verse 8, Paul refers to slanderous accusations made by "some people", that believers say "Let's do evil that good may result".

Bishop Charles Ellicott suggests that these accusers might have been the Jews or "the Judaizing party"; Barnes says it is "doubtless" that they were Jews; Moule argues that they were Paul's "inveterate adversaries in the Church".

== No one is righteous (verses 9–20) ==
Paul's statement that "both Jews and Greeks are under the power of sin" (verse 9) exposes the impossibility of either Gentile or Jew, unaided by God, being able to become righteous (contra Romans 2:7,13, etc.; consistent with Romans 7:7–24), as supported by a compilation of citations from the Hebrew Bible (Old Testament texts) in verses 10–18 describing humanity's utter depravity or incapability of not sinning (Ecclesiastes 7:20; Psalm 5:10; 10:7; 14:1—3; 53:2—4; 36:2; 140:4; Isaiah 59:7—8; Proverbs 1:16). Only Christ can break sin's power for Jews as well as for Gentiles.

== The revelation of God's righteousness (verses 21–26) ==
This section (extending to verse 31) revisits 'the grand theme', "the righteousness of God", which is introduced in the Thanksgiving part of chapter 1. Comprising one paragraph, verses 21–26 is called by Stuhlmacher as "the heart of the letter to the Romans", stating that "the divine character—faithful, gracious, forgiving, and merciful—has been revealed in Jesus Christ, specifically in his death as "a sacrifice for sin effective through faith"." With that actions, "altogether apart from human initiative", God has fulfilled "what God always intended to do" ("attested by the law and the prophets") "and so is proved righteous".

=== Verse 23 ===
For all have sinned, and come short of the glory of God;

— Romans 3:23, King James Version

- "Come short" (RSV, NKJV: "fall short) is translated from Ancient Greek: ὑστεροῦνται, romanized: hysterountai, also rendered as 'to be in want/impoverished' (Luke 15:14); 'to suffer need" (Philippians 4:12); 'to be destitute' (Hebrews 11:37), and here in the sense of 'to suffer from defect, to fail to attain'.

=== Verse 25 ===
whom God set forth as a propitiation by His blood, through faith, to demonstrate His righteousness, because in His forbearance God had passed over the sins that were previously committed

— Romans 3:25, New King James Version

"Propitiation" (RSV, NAB: "expiation") is translated from the Greek word hilasterion, which specifically means the lid of the Ark of the Covenant. The only other occurrence of hilasterion in the New Testament is in Hebrews 9:5, where the KJV, NKJV, RSV, and NASB all translate it as 'mercy seat'.

== Justification by faith – a conclusion (verses 27–31) ==
=== Verse 28 ===
Therefore we conclude that a man is justified by faith apart from the deeds of the law.

— Romans 3:28, New King James Version

- "We conclude" is translated from λογιζόμεθα, logizometha. The verb logizometha is plural: "we conclude" in the King James Version and New King James Version, "we hold" in the Revised Standard Version and New Revised Standard Version, "we consider" in the New American Bible, "as we see it" in the Jerusalem Bible and New Jerusalem Bible, "we maintain" in the New American Standard Version, "we reason" or "we maintain" in the Cambridge Bible for Schools and Colleges, arbitramur in the Vulgate. Anglican bishop Charles Ellicott considers that we conclude "conveys too much the idea of an inference; the statement is rather made in the form of an assertion, we consider or we hold", whereas the 18th-century English Baptist theologian John Gill treats the phrase as a "conclusion from the premises".

=== Verse 29 ===
Or is He the God of the Jews only? Is He not also the God of the Gentiles? Yes, of the Gentiles also.

— Romans 3:29

Romans 3:29 has been interpreted as Paul saying that "God's perfect, ultimate, righteous judgment would carry the same standards for all people".

== See also ==
- Torah
- Related Bible parts: Psalm 5, Psalm 10, Psalm 14, Psalm 36, Psalm 51, Psalm 53, Psalm 140, Ecclesiastes 7, Isaiah 59

== Bibliography ==
- Coogan, Michael David (2007). Coogan, Michael David; Brettler, Marc Zvi; Newsom, Carol Ann; Perkins, Pheme (eds.). The New Oxford Annotated Bible with the Apocryphal/Deuterocanonical Books: New Revised Standard Version, Issue 48 (Augmented 3rd ed.). Oxford University Press. ISBN 9780195288810.
- Hill, Craig C. (2007). "64. Romans". In Barton, John; Muddiman, John (eds.). The Oxford Bible Commentary (first (paperback) ed.). Oxford University Press. pp. 1083–1108. ISBN 978-0199277186.
- Kirkpatrick, A. F. (1901). The Book of Psalms: with Introduction and Notes. The Cambridge Bible for Schools and Colleges. Vol. Book IV and V: Psalms XC-CL. Cambridge: At the University Press.
