= Romans 5 =

- ← chapter 4 chapter 6 →
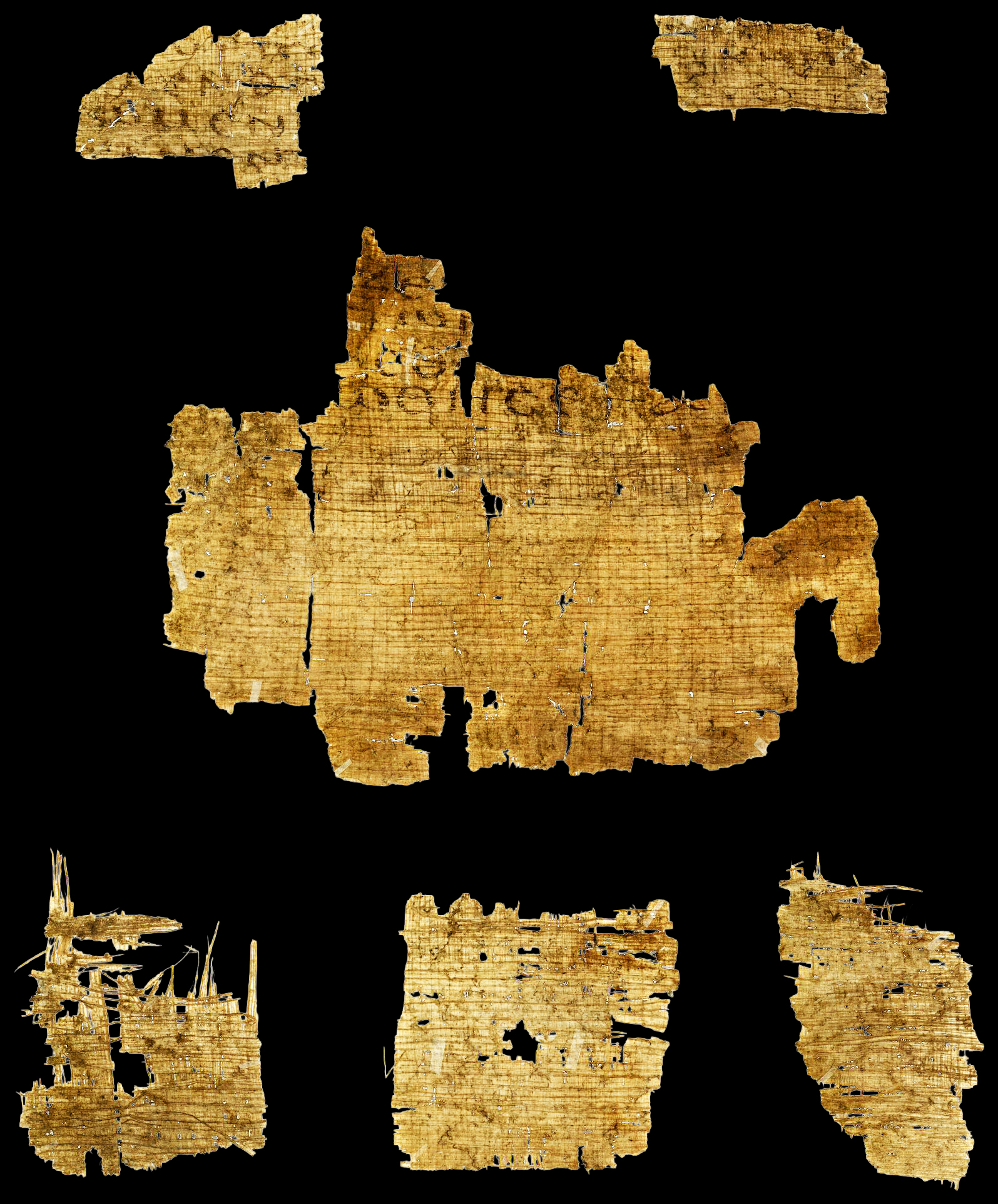
- Fragments c to h containing parts of the Epistle to the Romans in Papyrus 40, written c. AD 250
- Book: Epistle to the Romans
- Category: Pauline epistles
- Christian Bible part: New Testament
- Order in the Christian part: 6

Romans 5 is the fifth chapter of the Epistle to the Romans in the New Testament of the Christian Bible. It is authored by Paul the Apostle, while he was in Corinth in the mid-50s AD, with the help of an amanuensis (secretary), Tertius, who adds his own greeting in Romans 16:22.

According to Karl Barth, the "detailed argument" put forward in this chapter develops one of Paul's main themes in the epistle, as set out in the opening chapter: that the gospel of Jesus Christ reveals the righteousness of God.

== Text ==
The original text was written in Koine Greek. This chapter is divided into 21 verses.

=== Textual witnesses ===
Some early manuscripts containing the text of this chapter are:

- Codex Vaticanus (AD 325–350)
- Codex Sinaiticus (330–360)
- Codex Alexandrinus (400–440)
- Codex Ephraemi Rescriptus (~450; complete)
- Papyrus 31 (7th century; extant verses 3–8)

=== Old Testament references ===
- Romans 5:1 references Habakkuk 2:4: "But the just shall live by his faith"

== Peace with God through Jesus Christ (verses 1–11) ==
Romans 5:1 opens a new section in Paul's letter. Scottish Free Church minister William Robertson Nicoll imagines "that a pause comes [...] in [Paul's dictation of] his work; that he is silent, and Tertius puts down the pen, and they spend their hearts awhile on worshipping, recollection and realisation. The Lord delivered up; His people justified; the Lord risen again, alive for evermore – here was matter for love, joy, and wonder".

Paul resumes with "a description of the serene and blissful state which the sense of justification brings":

We have peace with God through our Lord Jesus Christ

The Textus Receptus reads εἰρήνην ἔχομεν, eirēnēn echomen, 'we have peace' but some manuscripts read εἰρήνην ἔχωμεν, eirēnēn echōmen, 'let us maintain peace with God' and similarly the Vulgate reads pacem habeamus, 'let us have peace'. Theologian Heinrich Meyer argues that this variant "is here utterly unsuitable; because the writer now enters on a new and important doctrinal topic, and an exhortation at the very outset, especially regarding a subject not yet expressly spoken of, would at this stage be out of place". The New Living Translation speaks of "peace with God because of what Jesus Christ our Lord has done for us".

=== Verse 2 ===
through whom we have obtained access to this grace in which we stand; and we boast in our hope of sharing the glory of God.

"Through whom" refers to "our Lord Jesus Christ" (verse 1). Craig Hill considers the word "boast", alongside the word "reconcile", to be the key verbs in this section, as far as verse 11.

The Vulgate differs in this verse and ends with et gloriamur in spe gloriæ filiorum Dei "and we rejoice in the hope of the glory of God's children"

=== Verse 8 ===
But God demonstrates His own love toward us, in that while we were still sinners, Christ died for us.

— Romans 5:8, New King James Version

- Cross references: John 3:16; John 15:13; 1 Peter 3:18; 1 John 3:16; 1 John 4:10

== Adam and Christ (verse 12–21) ==
In chapter 4 the story of Abraham provides the prototype for the doctrine of justification by faith, and in the first part of chapter 5, the justification won by Christ's death is characterized as reconciliation with God. This section deals with the reason that Christ's work alone can save others, because originally it was the action of one individual that affected the standing of all other persons, and that individual was Adam. Thus, Paul points out Adam as "precedent" (in form of "counterexample") for "the universality of Christ's atonement".

=== Verse 12 ===
Therefore as sin came into the world through one man and death through sin, so death has spread to all men, because all have sinned.

— Romans 5:12, Modern English Version

On the basis of Genesis 3, Paul argues that "sin came into the world through one man", who is Adam (not Eve), and the ubiquity of sin is proved by "the universality of its consequence, which is "death"" (cf. Genesis 3:3).

=== Verse 13 ===
For until the law, sin was in the world, but sin is not charged to one's account when there is no law.

— Romans 5:13, Lexham English Bible

=== Verse 14 ===
Nevertheless death reigned from Adam to Moses, even over those who had not sinned according to the likeness of the transgression of Adam, who is a type of Him who was to come.

— Romans 5:14, New King James Version

The law given through Moses actually increases human's culpability, as all humans could transgress the way Adam had transgressed, which is the "disobedience of an explicit commandment" (verses 13–14; cf. Romans 4:15).

=== Verse 18 ===
Therefore, as one trespass led to condemnation for all men, so one act of righteousness leads to justification and life for all men. —Romans 5:18, English Standard Version

Paul contrasts the universal effect of Adam's sinful act and that of Christ's redemptive work. This text has been viewed by some as evidence for universal salvation due to the parallel use of 'all men' (πάντας ἀνθρώπους) in reference to both "condemnation" and "justification". A similar point is made again by Paul in his first letter to the church at Corinth (cf. 1 Corinthians 15:21–22).

== See also ==
- Last Adam
- Moses
- Related Bible parts: Habakkuk 2, John 3, John 15, 1 Peter 3, 1 John 3, 1 John 4

== Bibliography ==
- Coogan, Michael David (2007). Coogan, Michael David; Brettler, Marc Zvi; Newsom, Carol Ann; Perkins, Pheme (eds.). The New Oxford Annotated Bible with the Apocryphal/Deuterocanonical Books: New Revised Standard Version, Issue 48 (Augmented 3rd ed.). Oxford University Press. ISBN 978-0-19-528881-0.
- Hill, Craig C. (2007). "64. Romans". In Barton, John; Muddiman, John (eds.). The Oxford Bible Commentary (first (paperback) ed.). Oxford University Press. pp. 1083–1108. ISBN 978-0-19-927718-6.
