= Romans 2 =

- ← chapter 1 chapter 3 →
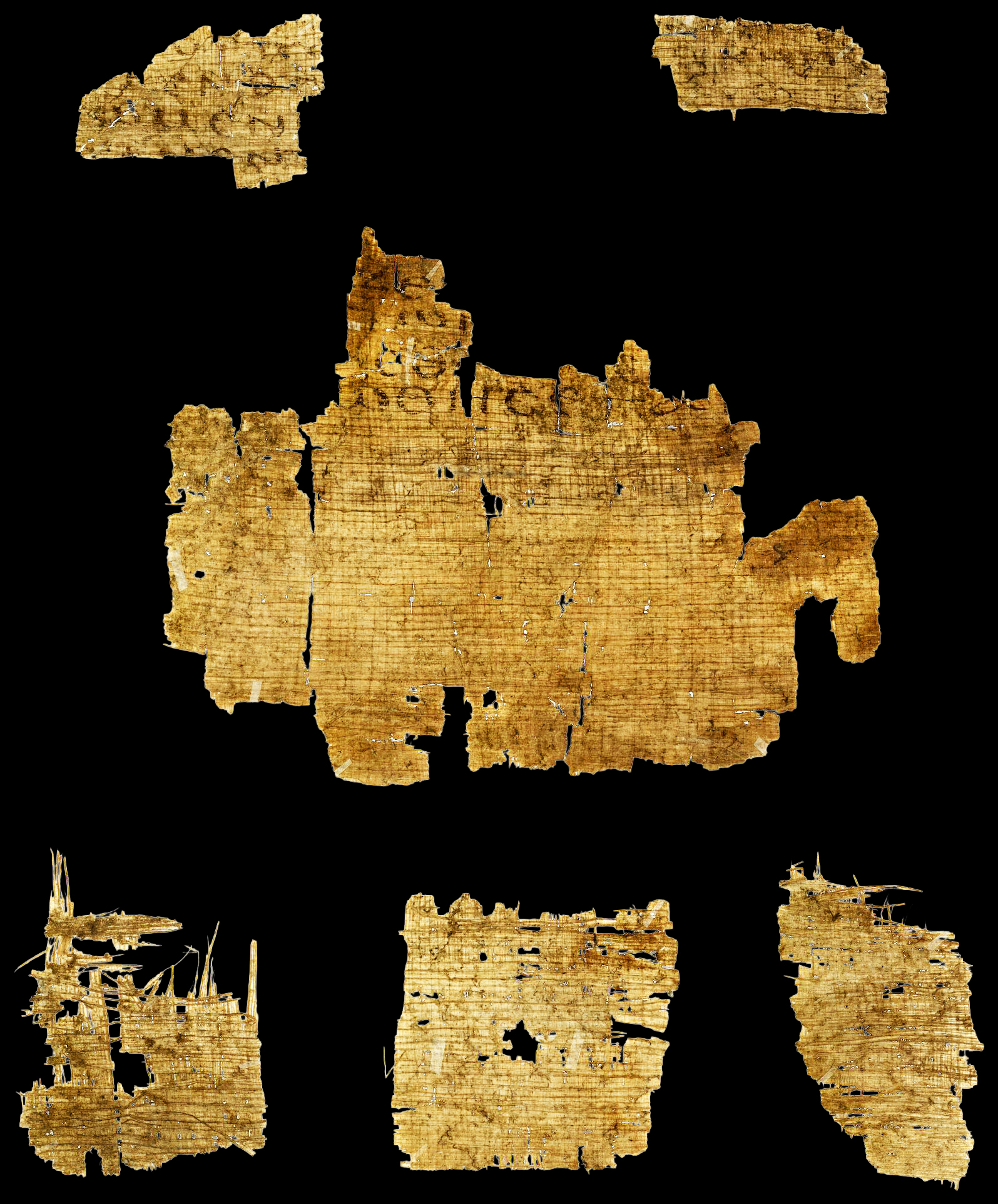
- Fragment c to h containing parts of the Epistle to the Romans in Papyrus 40, written c. AD 250
- Book: Epistle to the Romans
- Category: Pauline epistles
- Christian Bible part: New Testament
- Order in the Christian part: 6

Romans 2 is the second chapter of the Epistle to the Romans in the New Testament of the Christian Bible. It was written by Paul the Apostle, while he was in Corinth in the mid-50s AD, with the help of an amanuensis (secretary), Tertius, who adds his own greeting in Romans 16:22.

Biblical scholar William Sanday observes that although "the main theme of the Epistle [is] the doctrine of justification by faith", in verse 6 Paul "lays down with unmistakable definiteness and precision the doctrine that works, what a man has done, the moral tenor of his life, will be the standard by which he will be judged at the last day".

== Text ==
The original text was written in Koine Greek. This chapter is divided into 29 verses.

=== Textual witnesses ===
Some early manuscripts containing the text of this chapter are:

- Papyrus 40 (~250; extant verses 1–3)
- Papyrus 113 (3rd century; extant verses 12–13, 29)
- Codex Vaticanus (325–350)
- Codex Sinaiticus (330–360)
- Codex Alexandrinus (400–440)
- Codex Ephraemi Rescriptus (~450; extant verses 1–4)

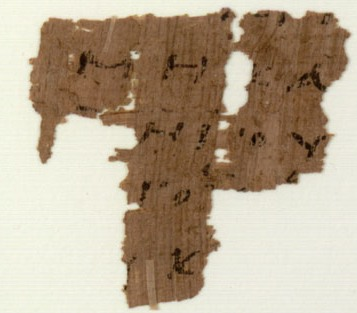
Romans 2:12–13 on Papyrus 113 (3rd century).

=== Old Testament references ===
- Romans 2:6 references Psalm 62:12 and Proverbs 24:12
- Romans 2:24 references Isaiah 52:5 and Ezekiel 36:20,23
- Romans 2:29 references Deuteronomy 10:16 and Deuteronomy 30:6

=== New Testament references ===
- Romans 2:5: James 5:3
- Romans 2:6: Matthew 16:27 and Revelation 22:12

== Analysis ==
Paul's rhetoric style here and in other parts of the epistle (cf. Romans 3:1-9; 3:27–4:25; 9:19–21; 10:14–21; 11:17–24; 14:4–12) resembles the diatribe, a form of argumentation by 'debating' with an imaginary opponent (as common among Cynic or Stoic philosophers), such as responding to objections using the expression "by no means!" (me genoito; cf. Romans 3:4, 6, 31; 6:2,15; 7:7,13; 9:14; 11:1, 11) to 'pull' the reader into the 'conversation' on Paul's side. Unlike in Romans 2:17–3:20 where Paul plainly addresses a Jewish interlocutor, the dialogue partner in verses 1–16 is not explicitly identified. The Jerusalem Bible states that the opening verses are addressed to the Jews, while Craig Hill observes that the whole of Romans 2:1–3:20 "speaks to perceived Jewish attitudes".

== God's righteous judgment ==
=== Verse 2 ===
But we are sure that the judgment of God is according to truth against them which commit such things.

Sanday notes Paul's assumption that this statement "will be acknowledged as a general principle by his readers, whether Jew or Gentile".

== No partiality with God ==
=== Verse 11 ===
For there is no partiality with God.

— Romans 2:11, New King James Version

- Cross-reference verse 11 with Deuteronomy 10:17 and Acts 10:34

=== Verse 16 ===
On that day when, according to my gospel, God judges the secrets of men by Christ Jesus.

This is the only reference to Jesus Christ after Paul's initial thanksgiving in Romans 1:8 until his reference to faith in Jesus Christ in Romans 3:22-26. Hill finds "almost nothing" to be "distinctly Christian" at this point in Paul's letter.

=== Verse 17 ===
Indeed you are called a Jew, and rest on the law, and make your boast in God,

The Textus Receptus (1550) reads Greek: ιδε συ ιουδαιος επονομαζη, ide su ioudaios eponomazē, which was translated in the King James Version as "Behold, thou art called a Jew". But many translations read "If you call yourself a Jew". Antoine Augustin Calmet lists "many manuscripts, Clement of Alexandria, Origen, St. Ambrose, Sedulius Scottus, Theophylactus, and the Latin Vulgate as reflecting the latter reading. Sanday calls the King James reading "corrupt" noting that the reading "but if" reflects "a decisive consensus of the best manuscripts".

== Circumcision ==
Paul refers to circumcision as a physical mark of Jewish identity, but for a Jew who breaks the law it becomes a sign of contradiction: "your circumcision has become uncircumcision" (Romans 2:25). The prophet Jeremiah had spoken of those who were "circumcised yet uncircumcised" (Jeremiah 9:25). Paul reiterates the teaching of Moses that:

He is a Jew who is one inwardly; and circumcision is that of the heart, in the Spirit, not in the letter

— Romans 2:25, New King James Version

drawing on Moses' words in Deuteronomy 30:6:

The Lord your God will circumcise your heart and the heart of your descendants, to love the Lord your God with all your heart and with all your soul, that you may live.

— Deuteronomy 30:6, New King James Version

== See also ==
- Torah
- Related Bible parts: Deuteronomy 10, Psalm 62, Proverbs 24, Isaiah 52, Ezekiel 36, Acts 10

== Sources ==
- Coogan, Michael David (2007). Coogan, Michael David; Brettler, Marc Zvi; Newsom, Carol Ann; Perkins, Pheme (eds.). The New Oxford Annotated Bible with the Apocryphal/Deuterocanonical Books: New Revised Standard Version, Issue 48 (Augmented 3rd ed.). Oxford University Press. ISBN 9780195288810.
- Hill, Craig C. (2007). "64. Romans". In Barton, John; Muddiman, John (eds.). The Oxford Bible Commentary (first (paperback) ed.). Oxford University Press. pp. 1083–1108. ISBN 978-0199277186.
- Moo, Douglas J. (1994). "Romans". In Carson, D. A.; France, R. T.; Motyer, J. A.; Wenham, G. J. (eds.). New Bible Commentary: 21st Century Edition (4, illustrated, reprint, revised ed.). Inter-Varsity Press. pp. 1115–1160. ISBN 9780851106489.
