= Romans 4 =

- ← chapter 3 chapter 5 →
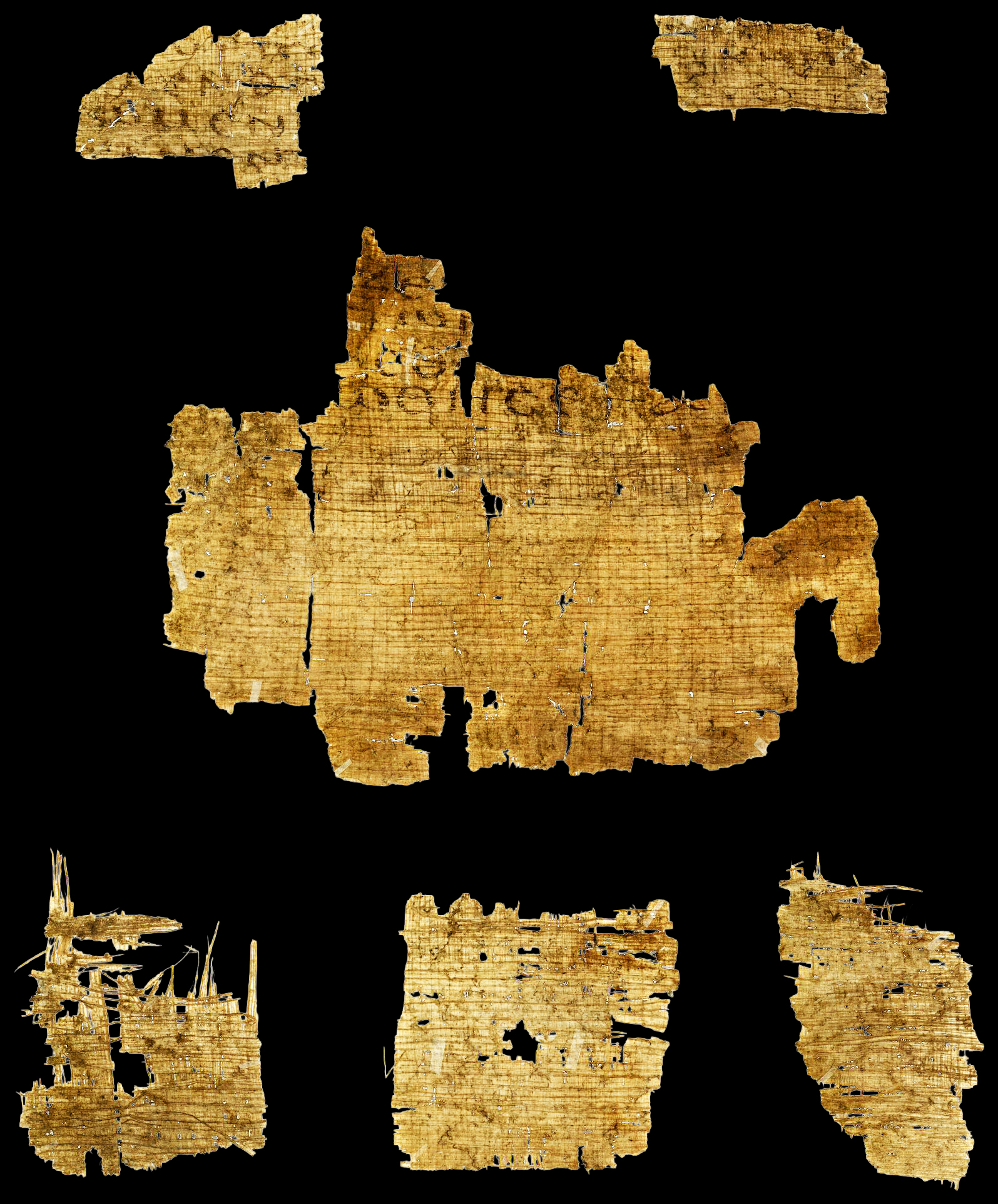
- Fragment c to h containing parts of the Epistle to the Romans in Papyrus 40, written c. AD 250
- Book: Epistle to the Romans
- Category: Pauline epistles
- Christian Bible part: New Testament
- Order in the Christian part: 6

Romans 4 is the fourth chapter of the Epistle to the Romans in the New Testament of the Christian Bible. It is authored by Paul the Apostle, while he was in Corinth in the mid-50s AD, with the help of an amanuensis (secretary), Tertius, who adds his own greeting in Romans 16:22.

The focus of this chapter is on Abraham, whose faith "was accounted (or imputed) to him for righteousness" (Romans 4:3). The Geneva Bible's chapter summary states that "ten times in the chapter [Paul] beateth upon this word, Imputation.

== Text ==
The original text was written in Koine Greek. This chapter is divided into 25 verses.

=== Textual witnesses ===
Some early manuscripts containing the text of this chapter are:

- Papyrus 40 (~AD 250; extant verses 1–8)
- Codex Vaticanus (325–350)
- Codex Sinaiticus (330–360)
- Codex Alexandrinus (400–440)
- Codex Ephraemi Rescriptus (~450; complete)

=== Old Testament references ===
- Romans 4:3 references Genesis 15:6
- Romans 4:7–8 references Psalm 32:1–2
- Romans 4:17 references Genesis 17:5
- Romans 4:18 references Genesis 15:5
- Romans 4:22 references Genesis 15:6

== Abraham's faith ==
=== Verse 1 ===
What then shall we say was gained by Abraham, our forefather according to the flesh?

The Jerusalem Bible (1966) sees Abraham's faith as an "example" or an "application" of the faith which Paul has described in chapter 3. T F Lockyer calls it "a test case", and Craig Hill treats this passage as an appeal, in a legal sense, to precedent. While many translations link the Greek: κατα σαρκα (kata sarka, "according to the flesh") with the Jews' ancestral relationship with Abraham, an alternative reading is recognised, for example in the New King James Version, which reads "What then shall we say that Abraham our father has found according to the flesh?"

=== Verse 3 ===
For what does the Scripture say? "Abraham believed God, and it was counted to him as righteousness."

— Romans 4:3, English Standard Version

Heinrich Meyer explains that the citation from Genesis 15:6 ("he believed in the LORD; and He counted it to him for righteousness") is quoted according to the Septuagint (LXX), which renders the active וְיַּחְשְׁבֶהָ, wa-yaḥ-shə-ḇe-hā, 'and he counted it' by the passive και ελογισθη, kai elogisthe, 'and it was accounted'. The passage follows from an account of where God has taken Abraham (then known as Abram, and childless) outside to count the number of stars, and promised "so shall your descendants be". Paul quotes the same verse in the same way in Galatians 3:6.

Meyer also disputes the charge from theologian Leopold Immanuel Rückert that Paul "made an unwarrantable use of the passage for his purpose", because here Paul definitely understood δικαιοσύνη, dikaiosynēn, 'righteousness' "in the dogmatic sense", justifiable in doing so, since "the imputation of faith as צְדָקָה, tsə-ḏā-qāh, 'for righteousness', was essentially the same judicial act which takes place at the justification of Christians".

=== Verse 18 ===
Who against hope believed in hope, that he might become the father of many nations; according to that which was spoken, So shall thy seed be.

Hope in nature (as far as nature could give hope) is contrasted with hope in God (that God could do what nature could not). The hope that Abraham might become the father of many nations is "most properly taken" as expressing the divine purpose in regard to Abraham and his destiny.

== See also ==
- Abraham
- David
- Genesis 12, Genesis 15, Genesis 17, Genesis 22, Psalm 32, Isaiah 53, Galatians 3, and Hebrews 11

== Bibliography ==
- Coogan, Michael David (2007). Coogan, Michael David; Brettler, Marc Zvi; Newsom, Carol Ann; Perkins, Pheme (eds.). The New Oxford Annotated Bible with the Apocryphal/Deuterocanonical Books: New Revised Standard Version, Issue 48 (Augmented 3rd ed.). Oxford University Press. ISBN 9780195288810.
- Hill, Craig C. (2007). "64. Romans". In Barton, John; Muddiman, John (eds.). The Oxford Bible Commentary (first (paperback) ed.). Oxford University Press. pp. 1083–1108. ISBN 978-0199277186.
