= Psalm 14 =

Biblical psalm

- "The fool hath said in his heart, There is no God."
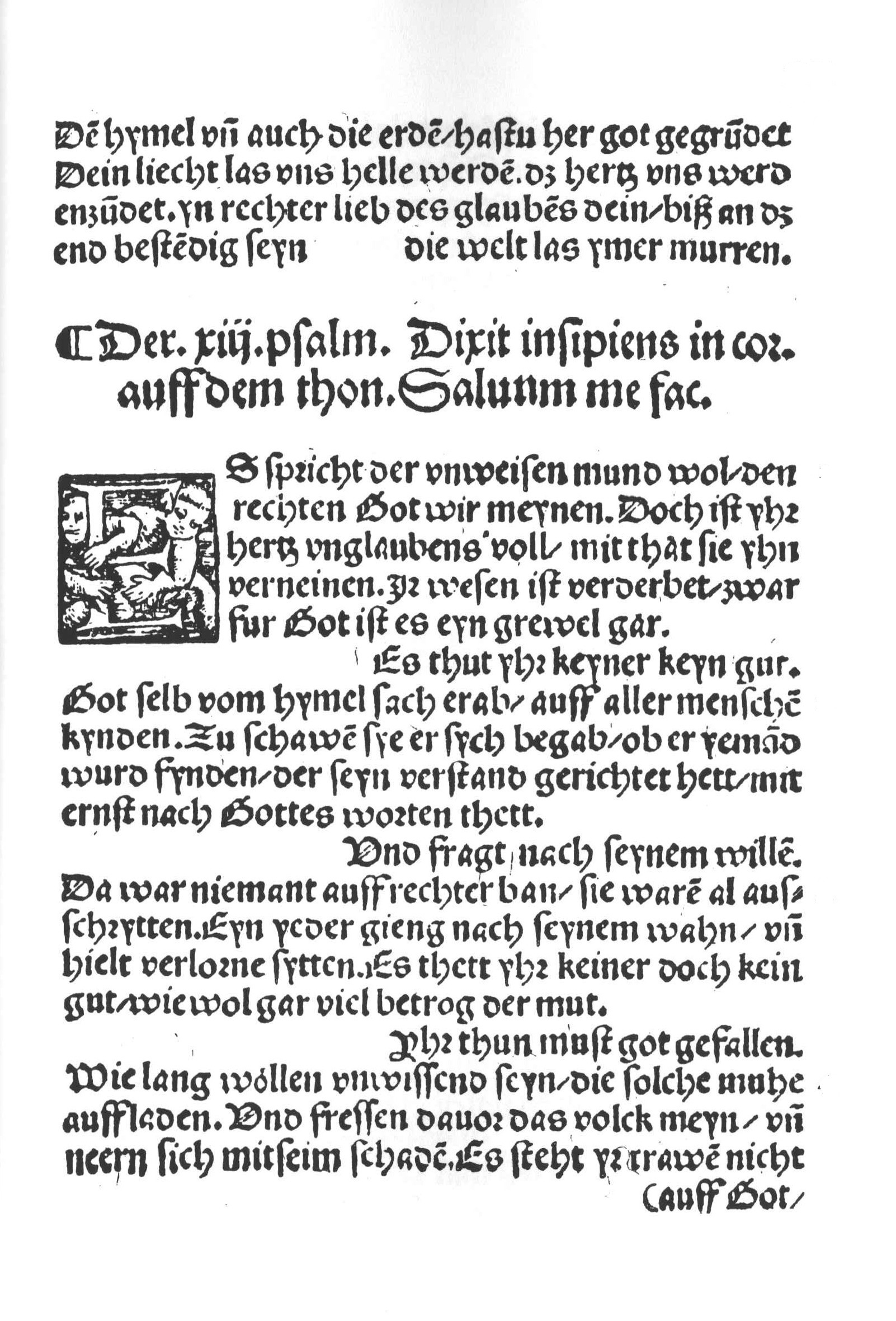
- Martin Luther's singable version of the 14th Psalm, "Es spricht der Unweisen Mund wohl", in the 1524 Erfurt Enchiridion
- Other name: Psalm 13; "Dixit insipiens in corde suo"
- Language: Hebrew (original)

Psalm 14
- ← Psalm 13 Psalm 15 →
- Book: Book of Psalms
- Hebrew Bible part: Ketuvim
- Order in the Hebrew part: 1
- Category: Sifrei Emet
- Christian Bible part: Old Testament
- Order in the Christian part: 19

Psalm 14 is the 14th psalm of the Book of Psalms, beginning in English in the King James Version: "The fool hath said in his heart, There is no God." In the slightly different numbering of the Greek Septuagint and the Latin Vulgate, this psalm is Psalm 13. In Latin, it is also known by its incipit as "Dixit insipiens in corde suo". Its authorship is traditionally assigned to King David. With minor differences, it is nearly identical in content with Psalm 53. Hermann Gunkel dates the psalm to the exile period.

The psalm forms a regular part of Jewish, Catholic, Lutheran, Anglican and other Protestant liturgies. It has been paraphrased in hymns such as Luther's "Es spricht der Unweisen Mund wohl".

== Meaning ==
David is telling the audience that it is foolish to not believe in God. The opening statement says, "The fool hath said in his heart, There is no God." In the Bible when something or someone is referenced to being "foolish", this means that this person is "someone who disregards God's word". He refers to them as corrupt and does work that is hateful when it says "abominable". David is making it clear that without God, man cannot do any good because we have a sinful nature. One who does not believe in God, is susceptible to hatefulness and corrupt behavior.

According to some Christian exegesis, David begins to reference the return of Christ to retrieve his people. When he discusses the salvation of Israel and bringing them out of captivity, he is saying that the Lord will bring the ones who call on his name and are his believers to safety, away from the dominion of sin on the earth.

== Text ==
The following table shows the Hebrew text of the Psalm with vowels, alongside the Koine Greek text in the Septuagint and the English translation from the King James Version. Note that the meaning can slightly differ between these versions, as the Septuagint and the Masoretic Text come from different textual traditions. (Note: A 1917 translation directly from Hebrew to English by the Jewish Publication Society can be found here or here, and an 1844 translation directly from the Septuagint by L. C. L. Brenton can be found here. Both translations are in the public domain.) In the Septuagint, this psalm is numbered Psalm 13.

#	Hebrew	English	Greek
1	לַמְנַצֵּ֗חַ לְדָ֫וִ֥ד אָ֘מַ֤ר נָבָ֣ל בְּ֭לִבּוֹ אֵ֣ין אֱלֹהִ֑ים הִֽשְׁחִ֗יתוּ הִֽתְעִ֥יבוּ עֲלִילָ֗ה אֵ֣ין עֹֽשֵׂה־טֽוֹב׃	(To the chief Musician, A Psalm of David.) The fool hath said in his heart, There is no God. They are corrupt, they have done abominable works, there is none that doeth good.	Εἰς τὸ τέλος· ψαλμὸς τῷ Δαυΐδ. - ΕΙΠΕΝ ἄφρων ἐν καρδίᾳ αὐτοῦ· οὐκ ἔστι Θεός. διεφθάρησαν καὶ ἐβδελύχθησαν ἐν ἐπιτηδεύμασιν, οὐκ ἔστι ποιῶν χρηστότητα, οὐκ ἔστιν ἕως ἑνός.
2	יְֽהֹוָ֗ה מִשָּׁמַיִם֮ הִשְׁקִ֢יף עַֽל־בְּנֵי־אָ֫דָ֥ם לִ֭רְאוֹת הֲיֵ֣שׁ מַשְׂכִּ֑יל דֹּ֝רֵ֗שׁ אֶת־אֱלֹהִֽים׃	The Lord looked down from heaven upon the children of men, to see if there were any that did understand, and seek God.	Κύριος ἐκ τοῦ οὐρανοῦ διέκυψεν ἐπὶ τοὺς υἱοὺς τῶν ἀνθρώπων τοῦ ἰδεῖν εἰ ἔστι συνιὼν ἢ ἐκζητῶν τὸν Θεόν.
3	הַכֹּ֥ל סָר֮ יַחְדָּ֢ו נֶ֫אֱלָ֥חוּ אֵ֤ין עֹֽשֵׂה־ט֑וֹב אֵ֝֗ין גַּם־אֶחָֽד׃	They are all gone aside, they are all together become filthy: there is none that doeth good, no, not one.	πάντες ἐξέκλιναν, ἅμα ἠχρειώθησαν, οὐκ ἔστι ποιῶν χρηστότητα, οὐκ ἔστιν ἕως ἑνός.
4	הֲלֹ֥א יָדְעוּ֮ כׇּל־פֹּ֢עֲלֵ֫י אָ֥וֶן אֹכְלֵ֣י עַ֭מִּי אָ֣כְלוּ לֶ֑חֶם יְ֝הֹוָ֗ה לֹ֣א קָרָֽאוּ׃	Have all the workers of iniquity no knowledge? who eat up my people as they eat bread, and call not upon the Lord.	οὐχὶ γνώσονται πάντες οἱ ἐργαζόμενοι τὴν ἀνομίαν; οἱ ἐσθίοντες τὸν λαόν μου βρώσει ἄρτου τὸν Κύριον οὐκ ἐπεκαλέσαντο.
5	שָׁ֤ם ׀ פָּ֣חֲדוּ פָ֑חַד כִּֽי־אֱ֝לֹהִ֗ים בְּד֣וֹר צַדִּֽיק׃	There were they in great fear: for God is in the generation of the righteous.	ἐκεῖ ἐδειλίασαν φόβῳ, οὗ οὐκ ἦν φόβος, ὅτι ὁ Θεὸς ἐν γενεᾷ δικαίᾳ.
6	עֲצַת־עָנִ֥י תָבִ֑ישׁוּ כִּ֖י יְהֹוָ֣ה מַחְסֵֽהוּ׃	Ye have shamed the counsel of the poor, because the Lord is his refuge.	βουλὴν πτωχοῦ κατῃσχύνατε, ὁ δὲ Κύριος ἐλπὶς αὐτοῦ ἐστι.
7	מִ֥י יִתֵּ֣ן מִצִּיּוֹן֮ יְשׁוּעַ֢ת יִשְׂרָ֫אֵ֥ל בְּשׁ֣וּב יְ֭הֹוָה שְׁב֣וּת עַמּ֑וֹ יָגֵ֥ל יַ֝עֲקֹ֗ב יִשְׂמַ֥ח יִשְׂרָאֵֽל׃	Oh that the salvation of Israel were come out of Zion! when the Lord bringeth back the captivity of his people, Jacob shall rejoice, and Israel shall be glad.	τίς δώσει ἐκ Σιὼν τὸ σωτήριον τοῦ ᾿Ισραήλ; ἐν τῷ ἐπιστρέψαι Κύριον τὴν αἰχμαλωσίαν τοῦ λαοῦ αὐτοῦ ἀγαλλιάσεται ᾿Ιακὼβ καὶ εὐφρανθήσεται ᾿Ισραήλ.

=== The Fools Bible ===
In 1763, in Britain, a version of the King James Bible was published that had a very noticeable misprint in the first verse of Psalm 14 which completely reversed the meaning of that verse. The misprint changed the start of the verse to "The fool hath said in his heart, There is a God" instead of "no God". The printers involved were fined £3,000 (a large sum of money at the time) for the mistake and all copies of the misprinted bible were ordered destroyed.

=== Additional passage ===
There is an additional passage after verse 3 which is present in the Septuagint, the Vulgate, and one Hebrew manuscript, but missing from the Masoretic Text and from Psalm 53. The passage (and verses 2 and 3) is quoted in full in Romans 3:13-18, taken from the Septuagint. The Hebrew and Greek of this passage, including verse 3, reads:

Hebrew

הַכֹּל סָר יַחְדָּו נֶאֱלָחוּ
אֵין עֹשֵׂה טוֹב אֵין גַּם אֶחָד׃
קֶבֶר פָּתוּחַ גְּרוֹנָם לְשׁוֹנָם יַחֲלִיקוּן
חֲמַת עַכְשׁוּב תַּחַת לְשׁוֹנָם אֲשֶׁר פִּיהֶם אָלָה וּמִרְמָה מָלֵא
קַלּוּ רַגְלֵיהֶם לִשְׁפּוֹךְ דָּם׃
מַזָּל רַע וּפֶגַע רַע בְּדַרְכֵיהֶם וְדֶרֶךְ שָׁלוֹם לֹא יָדְעוּ
אֵין פַּחַד אֱלֹהִים לְנֶגֶד עֵינֵיהֶם׃

English

They are all gone aside, they are together become filthy.
There is none that doeth good, not even one.
An open grave is their throat, their tongue speaketh smoothly.
Asp venom is under their tongue, whose mouth is full of cursing and deceit.
Their feet are swift to shed blood.
Misfortune and evil injury are in their ways, and the way of peace have they not known.
There is no fear of God before their eyes.

Greek

πάντες ἐξέκλιναν, ἅμα ἠχρειώθησαν,
οὐκ ἔστι ποιῶν χρηστότητα, οὐκ ἔστιν ἕως ἑνός.
τάφος ἀνεῳγμένος ὁ λάρυγξ αὐτῶν, ταῖς γλώσσαις αὑτῶν ἐδολιοῦσαν·
ἰὸς ἀσπίδων ὑπὸ τὰ χείλη αὐτῶν, ὧν τὸ στόμα ἀρᾶς καὶ πικρίας γέμει,
ὀξεῖς οἱ πόδες αὐτῶν ἐκχέαι αἷμα,
σύντριμμα καὶ ταλαιπωρία ἐν ταῖς ὁδοῖς αὐτῶν, καὶ ὁδὸν εἰρήνης οὐκ ἔγνωσαν·
οὐκ ἔστι φόβος Θεοῦ ἀπέναντι τῶν ὀφθαλμῶν αὐτῶν.

== Uses ==
=== New Testament ===
Some verses of Psalm 14 are referenced in the New Testament. Verses 1c, 2b, 3 are quoted in Romans 3:10–12

=== Book of Common Prayer ===
In the Church of England's Book of Common Prayer, Psalm 14 is appointed to be read on the evening of the second day of the month.

== Musical setting ==
Martin Luther paraphrased Psalm 14 in a hymn in German "Es spricht der Unweisen Mund wohl" in 1524, one of the eight songs in the first Lutheran hymnal, Achtliederbuch. Heinrich Schütz wrote a setting of this text, SWV 110, as part of the Becker Psalter.
