= Psalm 32 =

Biblical psalm

- "Blessed is he whose transgression is forgiven"
- Penitential psalms
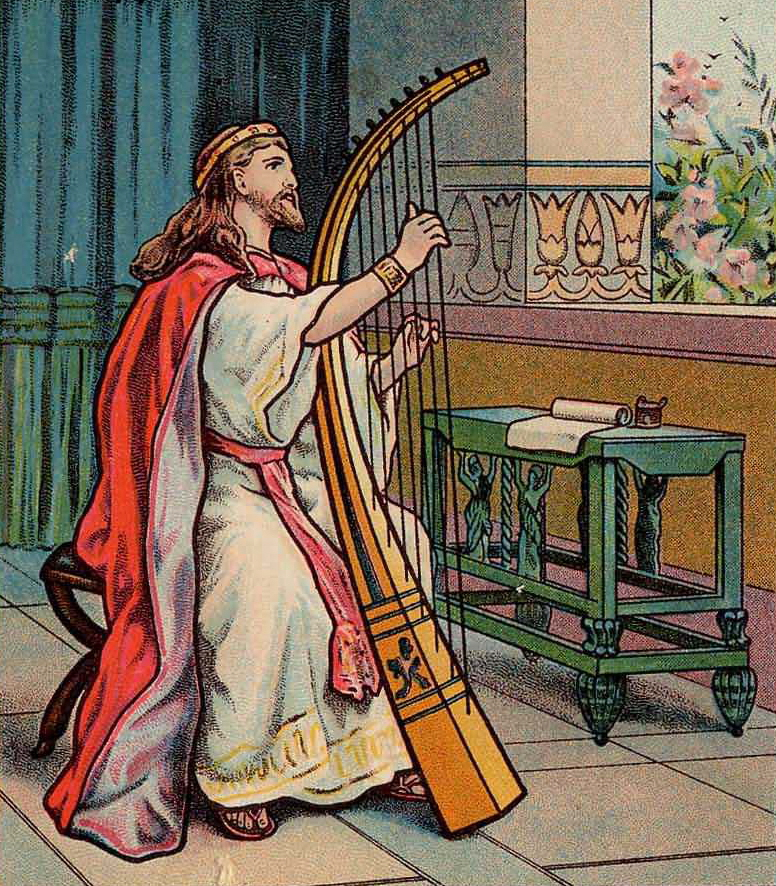
- David's Joy Over Forgiveness Bible card, 1903
- Text: attributed to King David
- Language: Hebrew (original)

Psalm 32
- ← Psalm 31 Psalm 33 →
- Book: Book of Psalms
- Hebrew Bible part: Ketuvim
- Order in the Hebrew part: 1
- Category: Sifrei Emet
- Christian Bible part: Old Testament
- Order in the Christian part: 19

Psalm 32 is the 32nd psalm of the Book of Psalms, beginning in English in the King James Version: "Blessed is he whose transgression is forgiven". The Book of Psalms is part of the third section of the Hebrew Bible, and a book of the Christian Old Testament. In the slightly different numbering system used in the Greek Septuagint and Latin Vulgate translations of the Bible, this psalm is Psalm 31. In Latin, it is known by the incipit, "Beati quorum". The psalmist (traditionally, King David) expresses the joy of being released from great suffering.

Psalm 32 is used in both Jewish and Christian liturgies. It has often been set to music.

== Theme and structure ==
The psalmist (traditionally, King David) expresses the joy of being released from great suffering. The psalm is divided into two parts: in verses 1–5, the psalmist proclaims the joy of seeing his fault remitted by God, and in verse 6 to verse 11, he shows his confidence in the conviction that God is the guide on the right path. The harm suffered by the psalmist is very hard to bear, although we can not know precisely its nature. The psalmist seeks to understand where it comes from, because at the time, misfortune was understood as a consequence of the sins one has committed. But far from being an opportunity to revolt, this event leads him to experience God's forgiveness.

This Psalm is one of the seven penitential psalms, as its focus is on the former sins of the psalmist. It is one of the psalms known as a maschil, meaning "enlightened" or "wise", and the Jerusalem Bible describes it as a "didactic psalm". The psalm itself is not a prayer of repentance, but a confession of sin is consummated. It also touches on themes of wisdom poetry, and belongs to the series of psalms of thanksgiving of an individual. According to James Luther Mays, the Psalmist, in the exercise of repentance teaches others of his experience and gives therefore instructions. It is divided into the following segments:

1. Verse 1: Commitment to repentance
2. Verse 3-5: The psalmist's distress
3. Verse 6: Forgiveness and admonition to others
4. Verse 8: Wisdom speech
5. Verse 10: Summary of experience
6. Verse 11: Rejoicing over the forgiveness of sins.

== Uses ==
=== New Testament ===
Paul the Apostle references verses 1 and 2 of the Psalm in Romans 4:7–8, in his explanation of salvation by faith, not works of the Mosaic Law.

=== Judaism ===
In Judaism, Psalm 32 holds significance and is used in various traditions and occasions:

- Psalm 32 is recited on Yom Kippur, the Day of Atonement, in some Jewish traditions. It is considered appropriate for this solemn occasion due to its themes of forgiveness and repentance.
- It is one of the ten Psalms included in the practice of the Tikkun HaKlali attributed to Rebbe Nachman of Breslov. This collection of ten Psalms is often recited or sung as a form of spiritual purification and healing.
- Verse 8 from Psalm 32 is part of the "Foundation of Repentance" recited on the eve of Rosh Hashanah, the Jewish New Year. This verse emphasizes divine guidance and instruction.
- **Rosh Hashanah Significance:** Verse 8 from Psalm 32 is included in the "Foundation of Repentance," which is recited on the eve of Rosh Hashanah, the Jewish New Year. This verse underscores the role of divine guidance and instruction in the lives of individuals seeking repentance and renewal. Rosh Hashanah marks the beginning of the Ten Days of Repentance, a period of reflection and spiritual growth leading up to Yom Kippur.

The inclusion of Psalm 32 in these significant Jewish practices highlights its importance in facilitating introspection, repentance, and spiritual transformation within the Jewish faith. It serves as a source of inspiration and guidance for individuals striving to strengthen their connection with God and seek forgiveness for their transgressions.

This Psalm's inclusion in these significant Jewish practices underscores its role in themes of forgiveness, repentance, and spiritual reflection in the Jewish faith.

=== Catholic Church ===
Following St. Benedict of Nursia, the practice in the Middle Ages was for monasteries to recite or sing this Psalm at matins on Sundays. Today, Psalm 31 is sung or recited at Vespers on the Thursday of the first week of the main four-weekly cycle of liturgical prayers.

=== Book of Common Prayer ===
In the Church of England's Book of Common Prayer, this psalm is appointed to be read on the evening of the sixth day of the month, as well as at Mattins on Ash Wednesday.

== Musical settings ==
Heinrich Schütz wrote a setting of a paraphrase of the psalm in German, "Der Mensch vor Gott wohl selig ist", SWV 129, for the Becker Psalter, published first in 1628.

== Text ==
The following table shows the Hebrew text of the Psalm with vowels, alongside the Koine Greek text in the Septuagint and the English translation from the King James Version. Note that the meaning can slightly differ between these versions, as the Septuagint and the Masoretic Text come from different textual traditions. (Note: A 1917 translation directly from Hebrew to English by the Jewish Publication Society can be found here or here, and an 1844 translation directly from the Septuagint by L. C. L. Brenton can be found here. Both translations are in the public domain.) In the Septuagint, this psalm is numbered Psalm 31.

#	Hebrew	English	Greek
1	לְדָוִ֗ד מַ֫שְׂכִּ֥יל אַשְׁרֵ֥י נְֽשׂוּי־פֶּ֗שַׁע כְּס֣וּי חֲטָאָֽה׃	(A Psalm of David, Maschil.) Blessed is he whose transgression is forgiven, whose sin is covered.	Τῷ Δαυΐδ· συνέσεως. - ΜΑΚΑΡΙΟΙ ὧν ἀφέθησαν αἱ ἀνομίαι καὶ ὧν ἐπεκαλύφθησαν αἱ ἁμαρτίαι·
2	אַ֥שְֽׁרֵי אָדָ֗ם לֹ֤א יַחְשֹׁ֬ב יְהֹוָ֣ה ל֣וֹ עָוֺ֑ן וְאֵ֖ין בְּרוּח֣וֹ רְמִיָּֽה׃	Blessed is the man unto whom the Lord imputeth not iniquity, and in whose spirit there is no guile.	μακάριος ἀνήρ, ᾧ οὐ μὴ λογίσηται Κύριος ἁμαρτίαν, οὐδέ ἐστιν ἐν τῷ στόματι αὐτοῦ δόλος.
3	כִּֽי־הֶ֭חֱרַשְׁתִּי בָּל֣וּ עֲצָמָ֑י בְּ֝שַׁאֲגָתִ֗י כׇּל־הַיּֽוֹם׃	When I kept silence, my bones waxed old through my roaring all the day long.	ὅτι ἐσίγησα, ἐπαλαιώθη τὰ ὀστᾶ μου ἀπὸ τοῦ κράζειν με ὅλην τὴν ἡμέραν·
4	כִּ֤י ׀ יוֹמָ֣ם וָלַיְלָה֮ תִּכְבַּ֥ד עָלַ֗י יָ֫דֶ֥ךָ נֶהְפַּ֥ךְ לְשַׁדִּ֑י בְּחַרְבֹ֖נֵי קַ֣יִץ סֶֽלָה׃	For day and night thy hand was heavy upon me: my moisture is turned into the drought of summer. Selah.	ὅτι ἡμέρας καὶ νυκτὸς ἐβαρύνθη ἐπ᾿ ἐμὲ ἡ χείρ σου, ἐστράφην εἰς ταλαιπωρίαν ἐν τῷ ἐμπαγῆναί μοι ἄκανθαν. (διάψαλμα).
5	חַטָּאתִ֨י אוֹדִ֪יעֲךָ֡ וַעֲ֘וֺנִ֤י לֹֽא־כִסִּ֗יתִי אָמַ֗רְתִּי אוֹדֶ֤ה עֲלֵ֣י פְ֭שָׁעַי לַיהֹוָ֑ה וְאַתָּ֨ה נָ֘שָׂ֤אתָ עֲוֺ֖ן חַטָּאתִ֣י סֶֽלָה׃	I acknowledge my sin unto thee, and mine iniquity have I not hid. I said, I will confess my transgressions unto the Lord; and thou forgavest the iniquity of my sin. Selah.	τὴν ἁμαρτίαν μου ἐγνώρισα καὶ τὴν ἀνομίαν μου οὐκ ἐκάλυψα· εἶπα· ἐξαγορεύσω κατ᾿ ἐμοῦ τὴν ἀνομίαν μου τῷ Κυρίῳ· καὶ σὺ ἀφῆκας τὴν ἀσέβειαν τῆς καρδίας μου. (διάψαλμα).
6	עַל־זֹ֡את יִתְפַּלֵּ֬ל כׇּל־חָסִ֨יד ׀ אֵלֶיךָ֮ לְעֵ֢ת מְ֫צֹ֥א רַ֗ק לְ֭שֵׁטֶף מַ֣יִם רַבִּ֑ים אֵ֝לָ֗יו לֹ֣א יַגִּֽיעוּ׃	For this shall every one that is godly pray unto thee in a time when thou mayest be found: surely in the floods of great waters they shall not come nigh unto him.	ὑπὲρ ταύτης προσεύξεται πρὸς σὲ πᾶς ὅσιος ἐν καιρῷ εὐθέτῳ· πλὴν ἐν κατακλυσμῷ ὑδάτων πολλῶν πρὸς αὐτὸν οὐκ ἐγγιοῦσι.
7	אַתָּ֤ה ׀ סֵ֥תֶר לִי֮ מִצַּ֢ר תִּ֫צְּרֵ֥נִי רׇנֵּ֥י פַלֵּ֑ט תְּס֖וֹבְבֵ֣נִי סֶֽלָה׃	Thou art my hiding place; thou shalt preserve me from trouble; thou shalt compass me about with songs of deliverance. Selah.	σύ μου εἶ καταφυγὴ ἀπὸ θλίψεως τῆς περιεχούσης με· τὸ ἀγαλλίαμά μου, λύτρωσαί με ἀπὸ τῶν κυκλωσάντων με. (διάψαλμα).
8	אַשְׂכִּֽילְךָ֨ ׀ וְֽאוֹרְךָ֗ בְּדֶֽרֶךְ־ז֥וּ תֵלֵ֑ךְ אִיעֲצָ֖ה עָלֶ֣יךָ עֵינִֽי׃	I will instruct thee and teach thee in the way which thou shalt go: I will guide thee with mine eye.	συνετιῶ σε καὶ συμβιβῶ σε ἐν ὁδῷ ταύτῃ, ᾗ πορεύσῃ, ἐπιστηριῶ ἐπὶ σὲ τοὺς ὀφθαλμούς μου.
9	אַל־תִּהְי֤וּ ׀ כְּס֥וּס כְּפֶרֶד֮ אֵ֤ין הָ֫בִ֥ין בְּמֶתֶג־וָרֶ֣סֶן עֶדְי֣וֹ לִבְל֑וֹם בַּ֝֗ל קְרֹ֣ב אֵלֶֽיךָ׃	Be ye not as the horse, or as the mule, which have no understanding: whose mouth must be held in with bit and bridle, lest they come near unto thee.	μὴ γίνεσθε ὡς ἵππος καὶ ἡμίονος, οἷς οὐκ ἔστι σύνεσις, ἐν κημῷ καὶ χαλινῷ τὰς σιαγόνας αὐτῶν ἄγξαις τῶν μὴ ἐγγιζόντων πρὸς σέ.
10	רַבִּ֥ים מַכְאוֹבִ֗ים לָ֫רָשָׁ֥ע וְהַבּוֹטֵ֥חַ בַּֽיהֹוָ֑ה חֶ֝֗סֶד יְסוֹבְבֶֽנּוּ׃	Many sorrows shall be to the wicked: but he that trusteth in the Lord, mercy shall compass him about.	πολλαὶ αἱ μάστιγες τοῦ ἁμαρτωλοῦ, τὸν δὲ ἐλπίζοντα ἐπὶ Κύριον ἔλεος κυκλώσει.
11	שִׂמְח֬וּ בַיהֹוָ֣ה וְ֭גִילוּ צַדִּיקִ֑ים וְ֝הַרְנִ֗ינוּ כׇּל־יִשְׁרֵי־לֵֽב׃	Be glad in the Lord, and rejoice, ye righteous: and shout for joy, all ye that are upright in heart.	εὐφράνθητε ἐπὶ Κύριον καὶ ἀγαλλιᾶσθε, δίκαιοι, καὶ καυχᾶσθε, πάντες οἱ εὐθεῖς τῇ καρδίᾳ.
