= Psalm 15 =

Biblical psalm

- "Lord, who shall abide in thy tabernacle?"
- Other name: Psalm 14; "Domine quis habitabit in tabernaculo tuo"
- Text: attributed to David
- Language: Hebrew (original)

Psalm 15
- ← Psalm 14 Psalm 16 →
- Book: Book of Psalms
- Hebrew Bible part: Ketuvim
- Order in the Hebrew part: 1
- Category: Sifrei Emet
- Christian Bible part: Old Testament
- Order in the Christian part: 19

Psalm 15 is the 15th psalm in the Book of Psalms, beginning in English in the King James Version: "Lord, who shall abide in thy tabernacle? who shall dwell in thy holy hill?"

In the slightly different numbering system used in the Greek Septuagint and Latin Vulgate translations of the Bible, this psalm is Psalm 14. The Latin version begins "Domine quis habitabit in tabernaculo tuo".

The psalm is attributed to David. It is often called an 'entrance liturgy', in which a worshipper asks the conditions of entering the worship place and a priest answers. The psalm forms a regular part of Jewish, Catholic, Anglican, Eastern Orthodox Church and Protestant liturgies. It has been set to music, including compositions by Heinrich Schütz.

== Analysis ==
According to the International Critical Commentary, "Ps[alm] 15 is a didactic poem, inquiring what sort of man is qualified to be a guest of Yahweh (verse 1); describing him in accordance with a decalogue of duties (verses 2-5b) and declaring such a man secure (verse 5c)." The duties listed emphasise virtues relating to one's neighbor.

The main topic of this psalm is "residence" (verse 1: "dwell"... "live") in God's "tent" (not "sanctuary") and how to be in 'holiness, without which no one sees God' (Hebrews 12:14).

Although the Psalm is captioned "A Psalm of David", and the Gemara also attributes this Psalm to David, Charles and Emilie Briggs considered this claim of authorship "unhistoric".

== Context ==
In Psalm 12 the godly perished and in Psalm 14 there is none righteous. That leaves a rhetorical question as to "who can ascend the mountain of God?" which is an inclusio (a pair of literary bookends) in Psalms 15–24, appearing in Psalm 15:1 and Psalm 24:3.

In the context of the culture of the time, "who [then] can dwell in His tent" as a guest would not only be welcome but also come under his special protection.

In the context of David's time, the ark has been in Shiloh in the tabernacle, and David moves the ark to Mount Zion to a newly made tabernacle there.

== Text ==
The following table shows the Hebrew text of the Psalm with vowels, alongside the Koine Greek text in the Septuagint and the English translation from the King James Version. Note that the meaning can slightly differ between these versions, as the Septuagint and the Masoretic Text come from different textual traditions. (Note: A 1917 translation directly from Hebrew to English by the Jewish Publication Society can be found here or here, and an 1844 translation directly from the Septuagint by L. C. L. Brenton can be found here. Both translations are in the public domain.) In the Septuagint, this psalm is numbered Psalm 14.

#	Hebrew	English	Greek
1	מִזְמ֗וֹר לְדָ֫וִ֥ד יְ֭הֹוָה מִי־יָג֣וּר בְּאׇהֳלֶ֑ךָ מִֽי־יִ֝שְׁכֹּ֗ן בְּהַ֣ר קׇדְשֶֽׁךָ׃	(A Psalm of David.) Lord, who shall abide in thy tabernacle? who shall dwell in thy holy hill?	Ψαλμὸς τῷ Δαυΐδ. - ΚΥΡΙΕ, τίς παροικήσει ἐν τῷ σκηνώματί σου; ἢ τίς κατασκηνώσει ἐν ὄρει ἁγίῳ σου;
2	הוֹלֵ֣ךְ תָּ֭מִים וּפֹעֵ֥ל צֶ֑דֶק וְדֹבֵ֥ר אֱ֝מֶ֗ת בִּלְבָבֽוֹ׃	He that walketh uprightly, and worketh righteousness, and speaketh the truth in his heart.	πορευόμενος ἄμωμος καὶ ἐργαζόμενος δικαιοσύνην, λαλῶν ἀλήθειαν ἐν καρδίᾳ αὐτοῦ,
3	לֹֽא־רָגַ֨ל ׀ עַל־לְשֹׁנ֗וֹ לֹא־עָשָׂ֣ה לְרֵעֵ֣הוּ רָעָ֑ה וְ֝חֶרְפָּ֗ה לֹא־נָשָׂ֥א עַל־קְרֹבֽוֹ׃	He that backbiteth not with his tongue, nor doeth evil to his neighbour, nor taketh up a reproach against his neighbour.	ὃς οὐκ ἐδόλωσεν ἐν γλώσσῃ αὐτοῦ, οὐδὲ ἐποίησε τῷ πλησίον αὐτοῦ κακὸν καὶ ὀνειδισμὸν οὐκ ἔλαβεν ἐπὶ τοῖς ἔγγιστα αὐτοῦ.
4	נִבְזֶ֤ה ׀ בְּֽעֵ֘ינָ֤יו נִמְאָ֗ס וְאֶת־יִרְאֵ֣י יְהֹוָ֣ה יְכַבֵּ֑ד נִשְׁבַּ֥ע לְ֝הָרַ֗ע וְלֹ֣א יָמִֽר׃	In whose eyes a vile person is contemned; but he honoureth them that fear the LORD. He that sweareth to his own hurt, and changeth not.	ἐξουδένωται ἐνώπιον αὐτοῦ πονηρευόμενος, τοὺς δὲ φοβουμένους τὸν Κύριον δοξάζει· ὁ ὀμνύων τῷ πλησίον αὐτοῦ καὶ οὐκ ἀθετῶν·
5	כַּסְפּ֤וֹ ׀ לֹא־נָתַ֣ן בְּנֶשֶׁךְ֮ וְשֹׁ֥חַד עַל־נָקִ֗י לֹ֥א לָ֫קָ֥ח עֹֽשֵׂה־אֵ֑לֶּה לֹ֖א יִמּ֣וֹט לְעוֹלָֽם׃	He that putteth not out his money to usury, nor taketh reward against the innocent. He that doeth these things shall never be moved.	τὸ ἀργύριον αὐτοῦ οὐκ ἔδωκεν ἐπὶ τόκῳ καὶ δῶρα ἐπ᾿ ἀθῴοις οὐκ ἔλαβεν. ὁ ποιῶν ταῦτα, οὐ σαλευθήσεται εἰς τὸν αἰῶνα.

== Uses ==
=== Christianity ===
Some see a chiastic structure of Psalms 15–24, with Psalm 19 in the center.

Many see Jesus as the one who can climb the hill of God and dwell in God's sanctuary, with the church in Him. This is supported by the frequent use of the phrase "right hand [of God]" in each of Psalms 16–21, except for Psalm 19. The right hand of God usually refers to an act of salvation. This Psalm is appointed as one of the Proper Psalms for Ascension Day.

Charles Spurgeon sees this psalm as an expectation of fruit in a believer's life.

Without the wedding-dress of righteousness in Christ Jesus, we have no right to sit at the banquet of communion. Without uprightness of walk we are not fit for the imperfect church on earth, and certainly we must not hope to enter the perfect church above.

=== Book of Common Prayer ===
In the Church of England's Book of Common Prayer, this psalm is appointed to be read on the morning of the third day of the month, as well as at Mattins on Ascension Day.

=== Coptic Orthodox Church ===
In the Agpeya, the Coptic Church's book of hours, this psalm is prayed in the office of Prime.

=== Judaism ===
Verse 4 is found in the repetition of the Amidah during Rosh Hashanah.

== Musical settings ==
Heinrich Schütz set a metric version of Psalm 15 in German, "Wer wird, Herr, in der Hütten dein", as part of the Becker Psalter, SWV 111.

== Sources ==
- Briggs, Charles Augustus; Briggs, Emilie Grace (1960) [1906]. A Critical and Exegetical Commentary on the Book of Psalms. International Critical Commentary. Vol. 1. Edinburgh: T & T Clark.
- Motyer, J. A. (1994). "The Psalms". In Carson, D. A.; France, R. T.; Motyer, J. A.; Wenham, G. J. (eds.). New Bible Commentary: 21st Century Edition (4, illustrated, reprint, revised ed.). Inter-Varsity Press. pp. 485–583. ISBN 9780851106489.
