= Psalm 53 =

Biblical psalm

- "The fool hath said in his heart, There is no God"
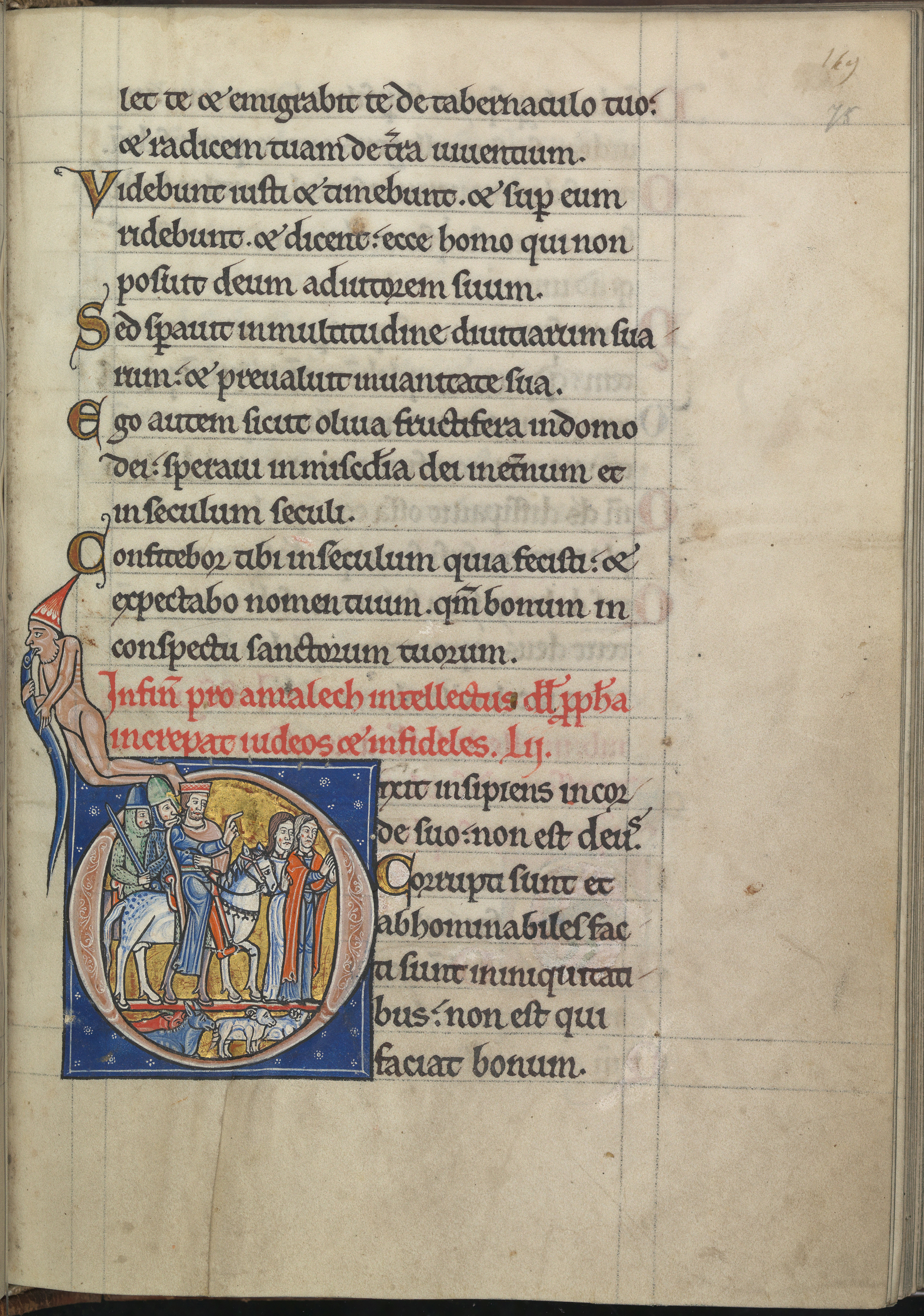
- Psalm 53, David and Abigail, in Psalter of Eleanor of Aquitaine (c. 1185)
- Other name: Psalm 52; "Dixit insipiens in corde suo non est deus"
- Text: Attributed to King David
- Language: Hebrew (original)

Psalm 53
- ← Psalm 52 Psalm 54 →
- Book: Book of Psalms
- Hebrew Bible part: Ketuvim
- Order in the Hebrew part: 1
- Category: Sifrei Emet
- Christian Bible part: Old Testament
- Order in the Christian part: 19

Psalm 53 is the 53rd psalm of the Book of Psalms, beginning in English in the King James Version: "The fool hath said in his heart, There is no God". In the slightly different numbering system used in the Greek Septuagint and Latin Vulgate translations of the Bible, this psalm is Psalm 52. In Latin, it is known as "Dixit insipiens in corde suo non est deus", It is described as a maskil or "contemplation of David".

The psalm forms a regular part of Jewish, Catholic, Eastern Orthodox and Protestant liturgies.

== Content ==
This psalm is the Elohistic Psalter's (Pss. 42–83) version of Psalm 14, and nearly identical to it. The medieval exegete Rashi understood Psalm 14 to refer to the destruction of the First Temple; this version, he thought, refers to the destruction of the Second Temple. Modern interpreters, following Hermann Gunkel's form criticism, classify this psalm as a lament.

There are two differences between Psalms 14 and 53, the name of God used being the first. Psalm 14 uses the covenant name of God, YHWH, typical of the Psalms in book 1 of Psalms (Psalms 1 through 41). Psalm 53 uses Elohim, typical of the Psalms in Book 2 (Psalms 42 through 72). Second, there is reference to "a refuge for the poor" in Psalm 14:6, which is missing from Psalm 53.

== Uses ==
=== New Testament ===
In the New Testament, verses 1–3 are quoted by Paul in Romans 3:10–12, where he argues that Jews and Gentiles are equally in need of God's grace. Since this Psalm and Psalm 14 are nearly identical, it is difficult to tell which one is quoted.

=== Book of Common Prayer ===
In the Church of England's Book of Common Prayer, this psalm is appointed to be read on the evening of the tenth day of the month.

== Musical settings ==
Heinrich Schütz set Psalm 53 in a metred version in German, "Es spricht der Unweisen Mund wohl", SWV 150, as part of the Becker Psalter, first published in 1628.

== Text ==
The following table shows the Hebrew text of the Psalm with vowels, alongside the Koine Greek text in the Septuagint and the English translation from the King James Version. Note that the meaning can slightly differ between these versions, as the Septuagint and the Masoretic Text come from different textual traditions. (Note: A 1917 translation directly from Hebrew to English by the Jewish Publication Society can be found here or here, and an 1844 translation directly from the Septuagint by L. C. L. Brenton can be found here. Both translations are in the public domain.) In the Septuagint, this psalm is numbered Psalm 52.

#	Hebrew	English	Greek
(Note: In the Jewish verse numbering, the ascription of this psalm is verse 1, and the rest of the psalm begins from verse 2. However, the Christian verse numbering does not count the ascription.)	לַמְנַצֵּ֥חַ עַֽל־מָחֲלַ֗ת מַשְׂכִּ֥יל לְדָוִֽד׃	(To the chief Musician upon Mahalath, (Note: Mahalath, meaning "disease", may have been the name of a particular tune or style.) Maschil, A Psalm of David.)	Εἰς τὸ τέλος, ὑπὲρ μαελέθ· συνέσεως τῷ Δαυΐδ. -
1	אָ֘מַ֤ר נָבָ֣ל בְּ֭לִבּוֹ אֵ֣ין אֱלֹהִ֑ים הִֽ֝שְׁחִ֗יתוּ וְהִֽתְעִ֥יבוּ עָ֝֗וֶל אֵ֣ין עֹֽשֵׂה־טֽוֹב׃	The fool hath said in his heart, There is no God. Corrupt are they, and have done abominable iniquity: there is none that doeth good.	ΕΙΠΕΝ ἄφρων ἐν καρδίᾳ αὐτοῦ· Οὐκ ἔστι Θεός. διεφθάρησαν καὶ ἐβδελύχθησαν ἐν ἀνομίαις, οὐκ ἔστι ποιῶν ἀγαθόν.
2	אֱֽלֹהִ֗ים מִשָּׁמַיִם֮ הִשְׁקִ֢יף עַֽל־בְּנֵי־אָ֫דָ֥ם לִ֭רְאוֹת הֲיֵ֣שׁ מַשְׂכִּ֑יל דֹּ֝רֵ֗שׁ אֶת־אֱלֹהִֽים׃	God looked down from heaven upon the children of men, to see if there were any that did understand, that did seek God.	ὁ Θεὸς ἐκ τοῦ οὐρανοῦ διέκυψεν ἐπὶ τοὺς υἱοὺς τῶν ἀνθρώπων τοῦ ἰδεῖν εἰ ἔστι συνιὼν ἢ ἐκζητῶν τὸν Θεόν.
3	כֻּלּ֥וֹ סָג֮ יַחְדָּ֢ו נֶ֫אֱלָ֥חוּ אֵ֤ין עֹֽשֵׂה־ט֑וֹב אֵ֝֗ין גַּם־אֶחָֽד׃	Every one of them is gone back: they are altogether become filthy; there is none that doeth good, no, not one.	πάντες ἐξέκλιναν, ἅμα ἠχρειώθησαν, οὐκ ἔστι ποιῶν ἀγαθόν, οὐκ ἔστιν ἕως ἑνός.
4	הֲלֹ֥א יָדְעוּ֮ פֹּ֤עֲלֵ֫י אָ֥וֶן אֹכְלֵ֣י עַ֭מִּי אָ֣כְלוּ לֶ֑חֶם אֱ֝לֹהִ֗ים לֹ֣א קָרָֽאוּ׃	Have the workers of iniquity no knowledge? who eat up my people as they eat bread: they have not called upon God.	οὐχί γνώσονται πάντες οἱ ἐργαζόμενοι τὴν ἀνομίαν; οἱ κατεσθίοντες τὸν λαόν μου ἐν βρώσει ἄρτου τὸν Κύριον οὐκ ἐπεκαλέσαντο.
5	שָׁ֤ם ׀ פָּ֥חֲדוּ פַחַד֮ לֹא־הָ֢יָ֫ה פָ֥חַד כִּֽי־אֱלֹהִ֗ים פִּ֭זַּר עַצְמ֣וֹת חֹנָ֑ךְ הֱ֝בִשֹׁ֗תָה כִּֽי־אֱלֹהִ֥ים מְאָסָֽם׃	There were they in great fear, where no fear was: for God hath scattered the bones of him that encampeth against thee: thou hast put them to shame, because God hath despised them.	ἐκεῖ ἐφοβήθησαν φόβον, οὗ οὐκ ἦν φόβος, ὅτι ὁ Θεὸς διεσπόρπισεν ὀστᾶ ἀνθρωπαρέσκων· κατῃσχύνθησαν, ὅτι ὁ Θεὸς ἐξουδένωσεν αὐτούς.
6	מִ֥י יִתֵּ֣ן מִצִּיּוֹן֮ יְשֻׁע֢וֹת יִשְׂרָ֫אֵ֥ל בְּשׁ֣וּב אֱ֭לֹהִים שְׁב֣וּת עַמּ֑וֹ יָגֵ֥ל יַ֝עֲקֹ֗ב יִשְׂמַ֥ח יִשְׂרָאֵֽל׃	Oh that the salvation of Israel were come out of Zion! When God bringeth back the captivity of his people, Jacob shall rejoice, and Israel shall be glad.	τίς δώσει ἐκ Σιὼν τὸ σωτήριον τοῦ ᾿Ισραήλ; ἐν τῷ ἀποστρέψαι τὸν Θεὸν τὴν αἰχμαλωσίαν τοῦ λαοῦ αὐτοῦ ἀγαλλιάσεται ᾿Ιακὼβ καὶ εὐφρανθήσεται ᾿Ισραήλ.
