= Es spricht der Unweisen Mund wohl =

Lutheran hymn of 1524

- Hymn by Martin Luther
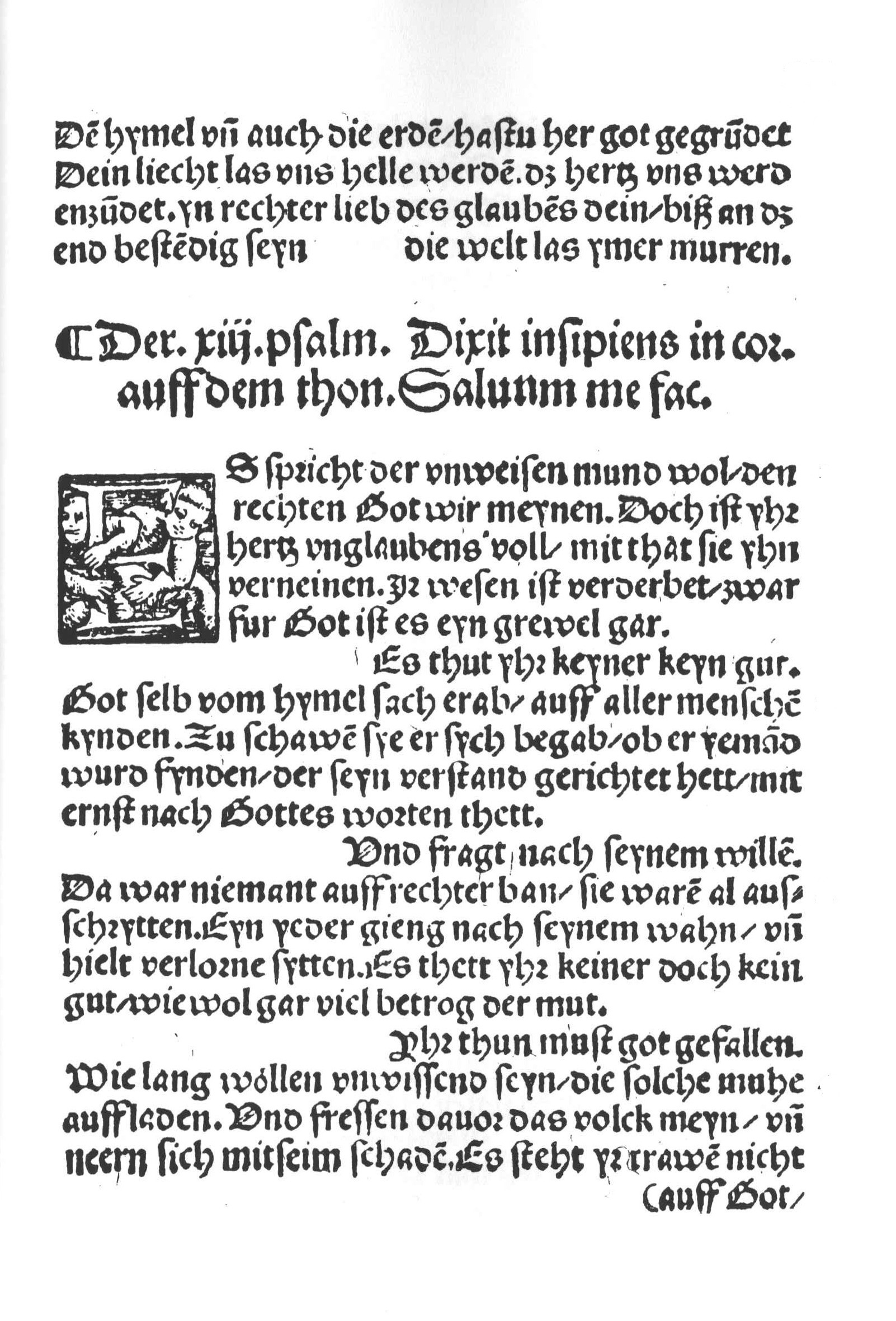
- Der XIII. Psalm. "Dixit insipiens in cor., Erfurt Enchiridion, 1524
- English: "The mouth of fools doth God confess"
- Text: by Martin Luther
- Language: German
- Published: 1524

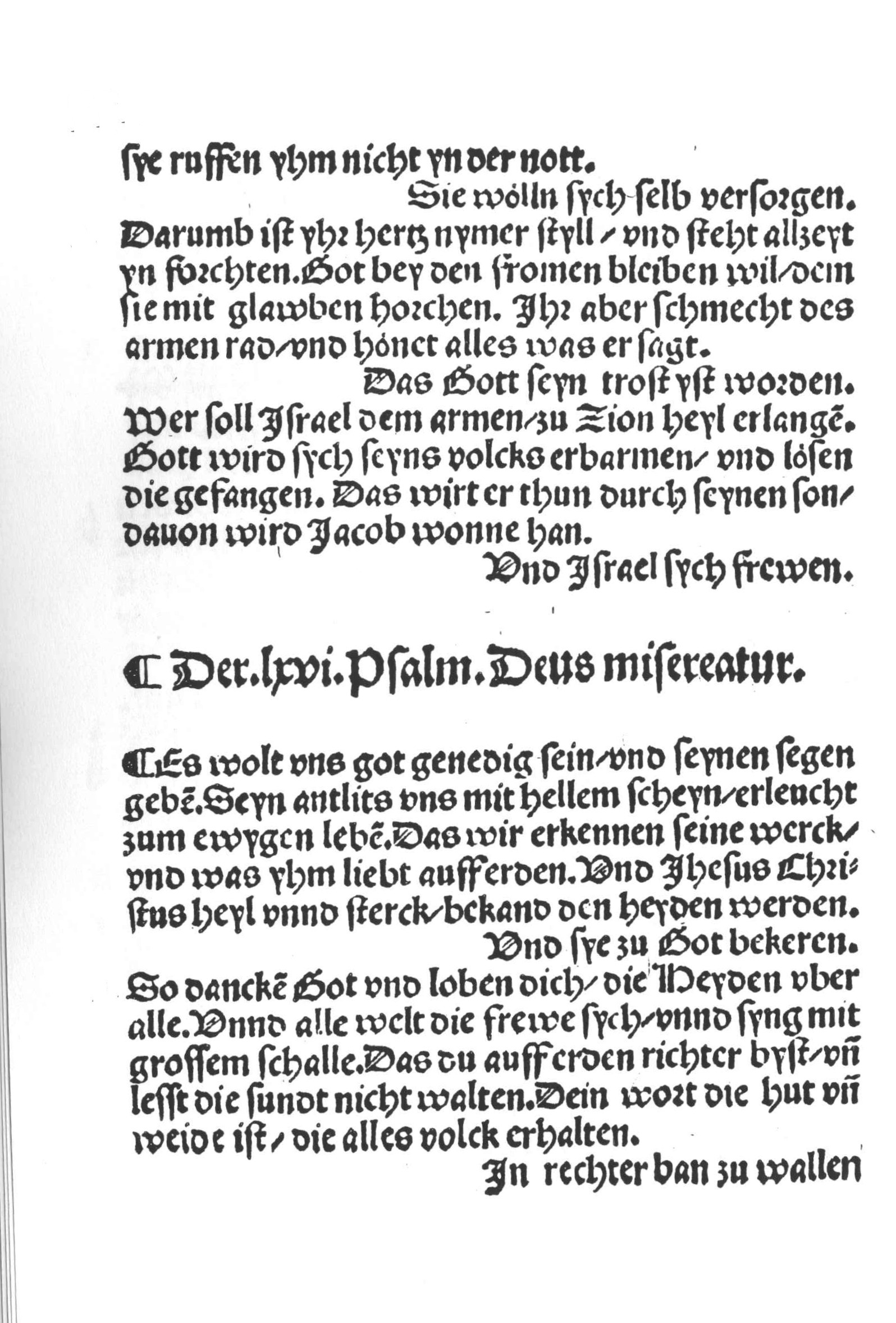
Der XIII. Psalm. "Dixit insipiens in cor., p. 2, Erfurt Enchiridion, 1524

"Es spricht der Unweisen Mund wohl" ("The mouth of fools doth God confess") is a Lutheran hymn of 1524, with words written by Martin Luther in 1523, paraphrasing Psalm 14. It was published as one of eight songs in 1524 in the first Lutheran hymnal, the Achtliederbuch. It was also published later that year in the Erfurt Enchiridion. It has appeared in many hymnals, both in German and in translation. The text inspired vocal and organ music by composers such as Johann Pachelbel.

== History and text ==
At the end of 1523, Luther paraphrased Psalm 14 (Psalm 13 in Vulgata numbering), in Latin Dixit insipiens in cor, attempting to make the psalms accessible to Protestant church services in German. As he did with "Ach Gott, vom Himmel sieh darein", Luther expanded the content of the psalm to show the precise situation of the early Reformation as a time of conflict. Luther wrote six stanzas of seven lines each.

The hymn was one of the eight hymns in the first Lutheran hymnal, published 1524 in Nuremberg under the title Etlich Cristlich lider (Some Christian songs), also called Achtliederbuch, which contained four songs by Luther, three by Speratus, and one by Justus Jonas. Later that same year it appeared in Erfurt in Eyn Enchiridion, and in Wittenberg in Johann Walter's choral hymnal Eyn geystlich Gesangk Buchleyn in a five-part setting.

== Melody and settings ==
In the Achtliederbuch, "Es ist das Heil uns kommen her", by Paul Speratus, was indicated as the singing tune for "Es spricht der Unweisen Mund wohl". The hymn appeared with its own melody in the Walter hymnal: that melody, Zahn No. 4436, remained associated with it.

The hymn was set by composers for instruments and for voices. Johann Pachelbel composed three chorale preludes for organ as part of Erster Theil etlicher Choräle (Choräle zum praeambuliren) before 1693. Johann Sebastian Bach set the hymn in a four-part setting, BWV 308, but without text. The text was added in the Neue Bach-Ausgabe.

== Translation ==
The hymn was translated to English as "The mouth of fools doth God confess" and appeared in R. Massie's M. Luther's Spiritual Songs in 1854. It was copied to other hymnals. Other, less common translations were published in the 19th century.

== See also ==
- List of hymns by Martin Luther
