= Romans 1 =

- ← Acts 28 chapter 2 →
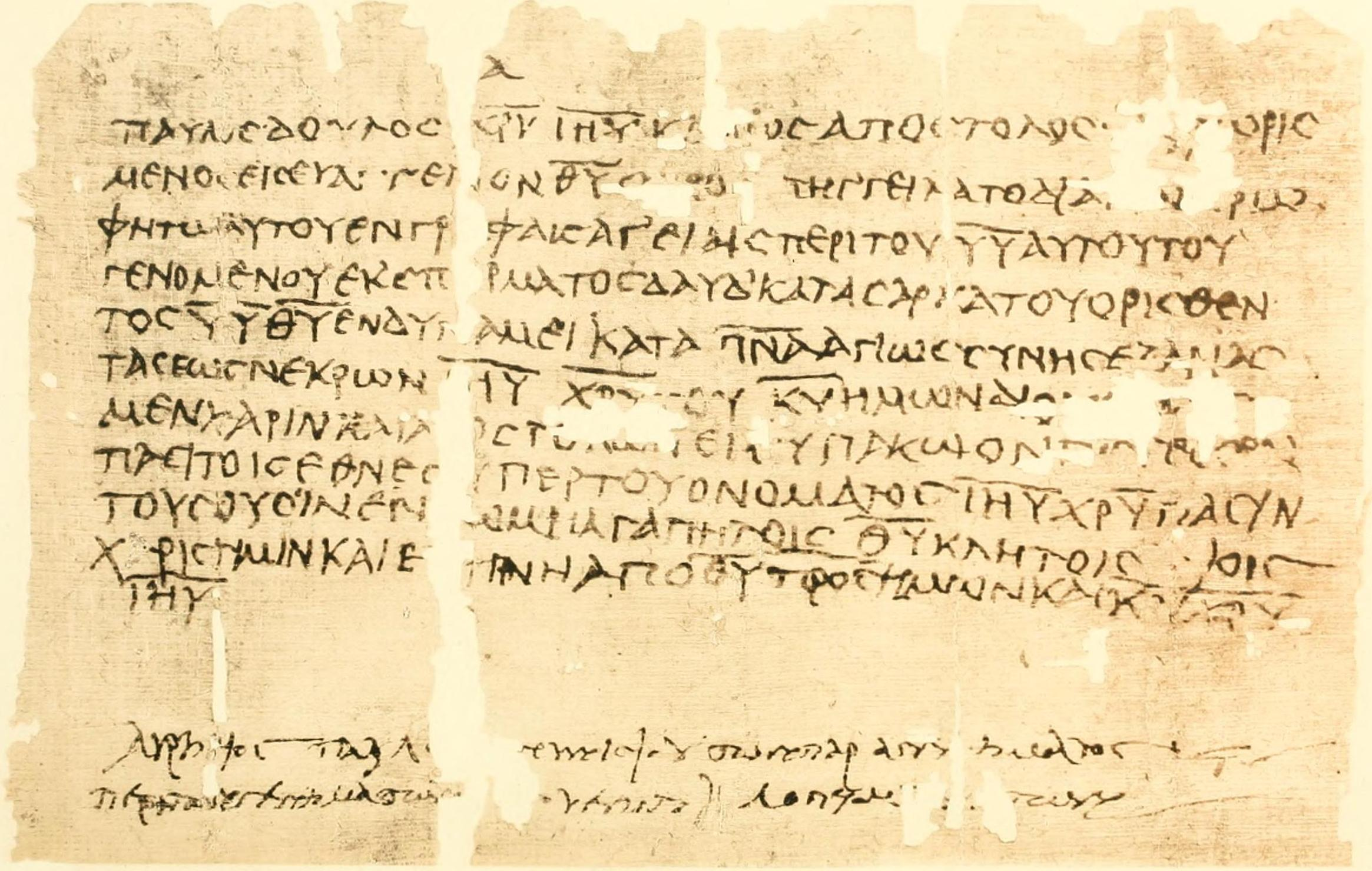
- Epistle to the Romans 1:1–7 in Papyrus 10, written c. AD 316
- Book: Epistle to the Romans
- Category: Pauline epistles
- Christian Bible part: New Testament
- Order in the Christian part: 6

Rome and Corinth in the Mediterranean

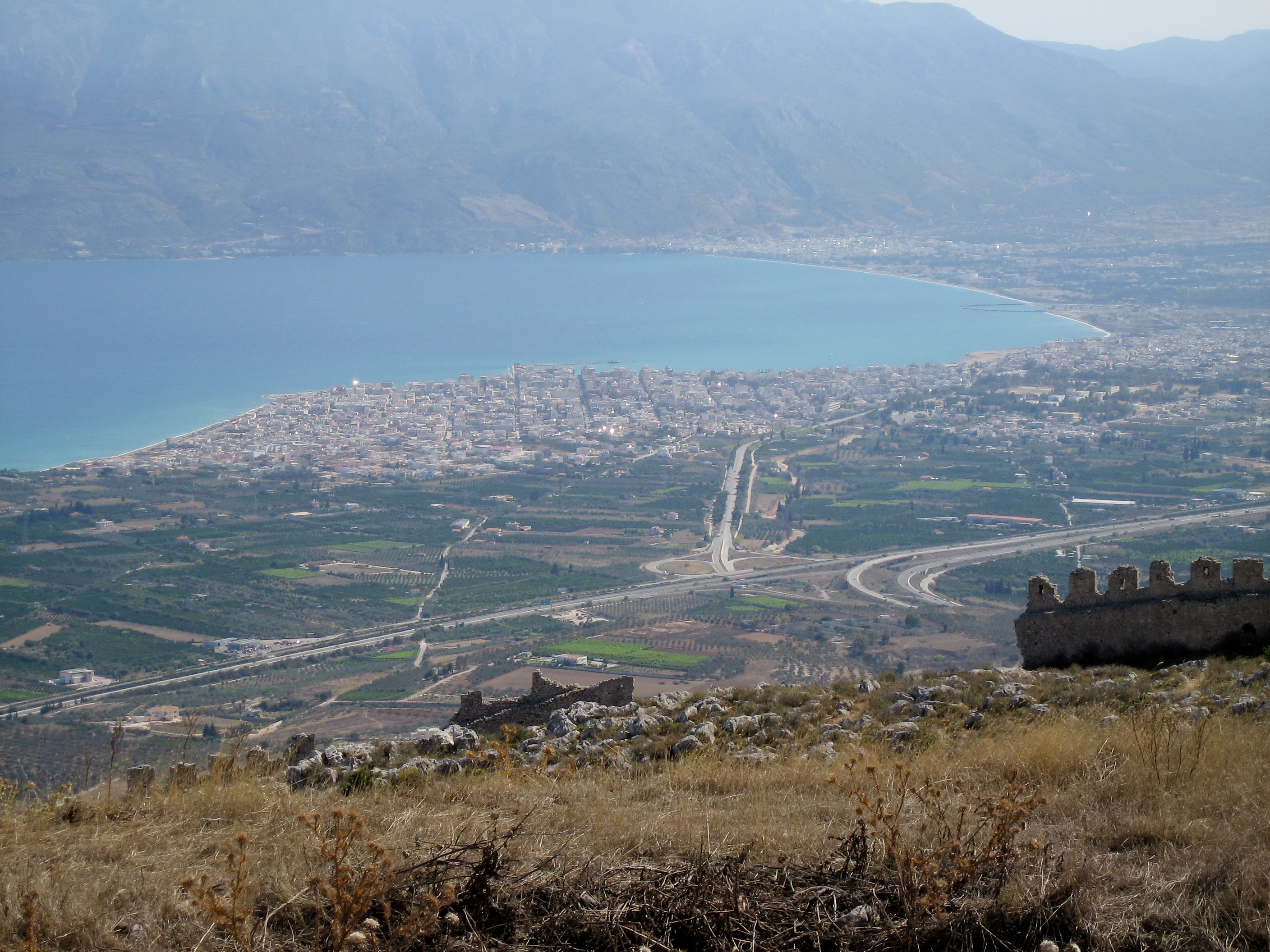
The city of Corinth, where the Epistle to the Romans was written, a view from the summit of Acrocorinth (2007)

Romans 1 is the first chapter of the Epistle to the Romans in the New Testament of the Christian Bible. It was authored by Paul the Apostle, while he was in Corinth in the mid-50s AD, with the help of an amanuensis (secretary), Tertius, who added his own greeting in Romans 16:22.

Acts 20:3 records that Paul stayed in Greece, probably Corinth, for three months. The letter is addressed "to all those in Rome who are loved by God and called to be saints".

== Historical context ==
The church in Rome had a unique historical background that influenced Paul's approach in this letter. Unlike many other churches Paul wrote to, the Roman church was not founded by him. The community of believers there had been established earlier, likely following the events of Pentecost, as visitors from Rome were present (Acts 2:10).

A significant event in the church's history was the expulsion of Jews from Rome under Emperor Claudius (mentioned in Acts 18:2). This decree, confirmed by the Roman historian Suetonius, temporarily altered the composition of the Roman church, leaving predominantly Gentile believers in leadership positions. Upon Claudius's death, Jewish Christians returned to Rome, potentially creating tension between the two groups - a situation that Paul addresses throughout the letter.

== Text ==
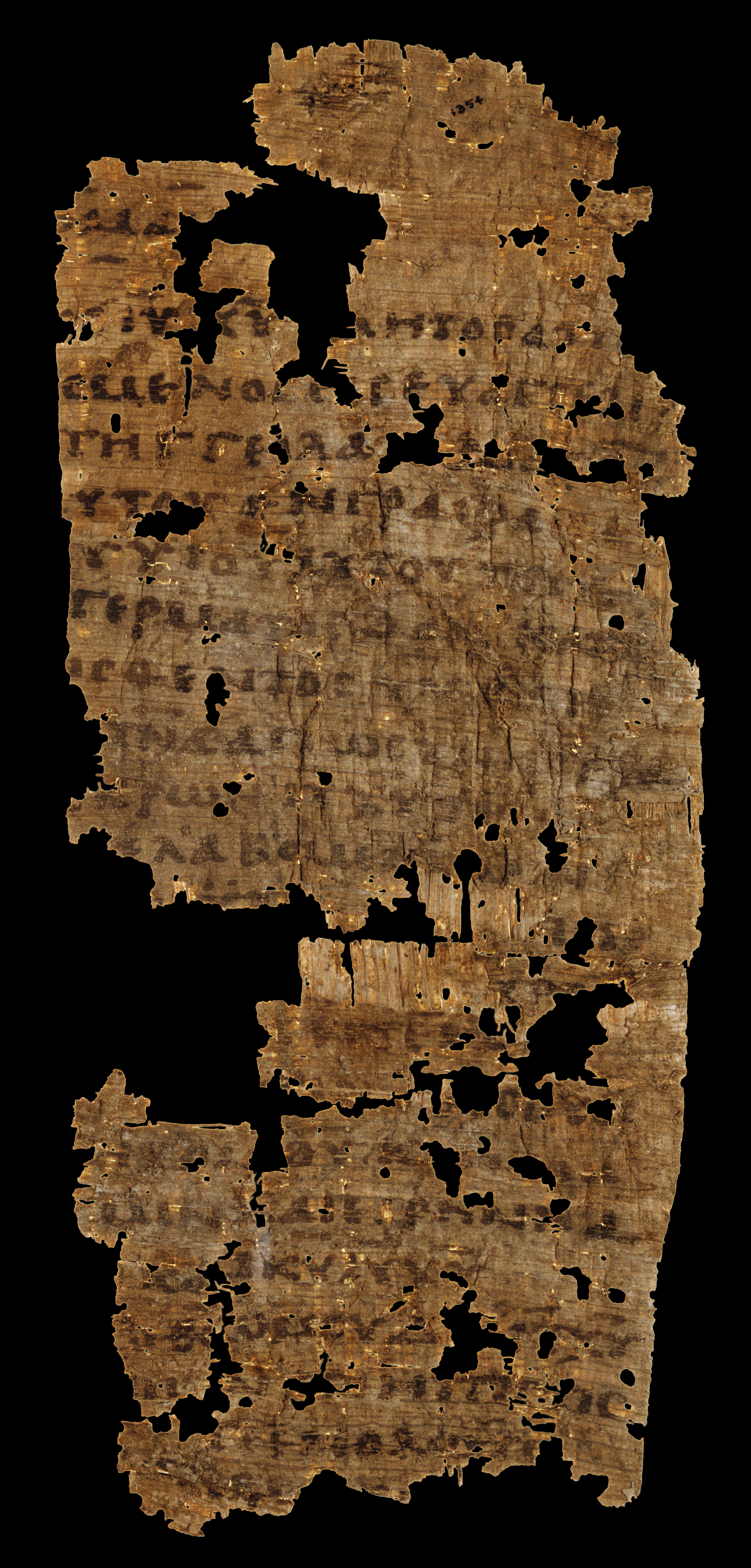
recto

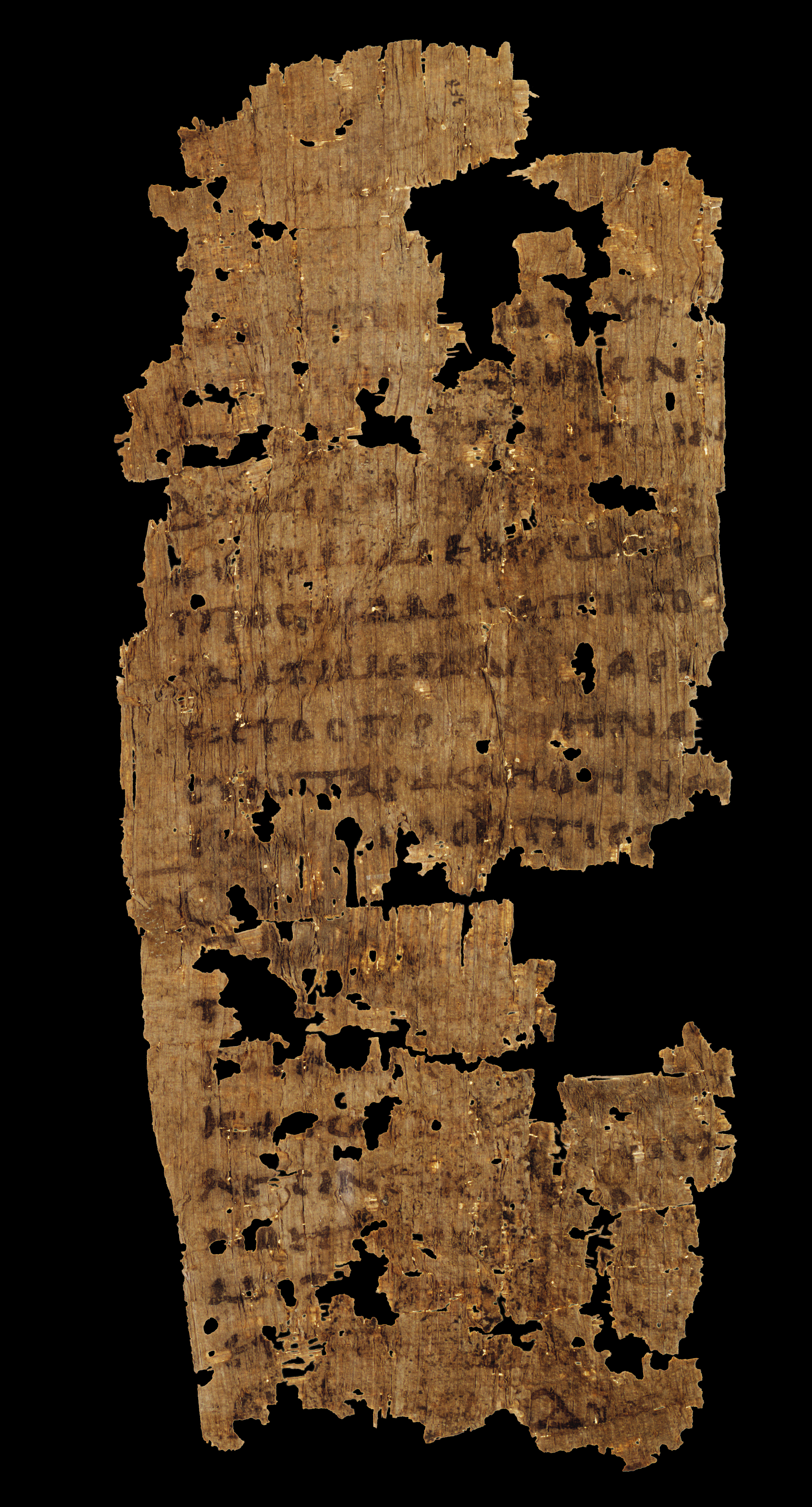
verso

Romans 1:1–16 on Papyrus 26 from 6th/7th century

The original text was written in Koine Greek. This chapter is divided into 32 verses.

=== Textual witnesses ===
Some early manuscripts containing the text of this chapter in Koine Greek are:

- Papyrus 40 (~250; extant verses 24–27, 31–32)
- Papyrus 10 (AD 316; extant verses 1–7)
- Codex Vaticanus (325–350)
- Codex Sinaiticus (330–360)
- Codex Alexandrinus (400–440)
- Codex Ephraemi Rescriptus (~450; extant verses 4–32)

A later manuscript, Codex Boernerianus (probably ninth century) does not use the phrase ἐν Ῥώμῃ ('in Rome'). In verse 7 this phrase was replaced by ἐν ἀγαπῃ ('in love', Latin interlinear text – in caritate et dilectione), and in verse 15 the phrase is omitted from both the Greek and Latin texts.

=== Old Testament references ===
- Romans 1:17 quotes Habakkuk 2:4
- Romans 1:23: Psalm 10:10

=== New Testament references ===
- Romans 1:1: Acts 13,1
- Romans 1:17's quotation of Habakkuk 2:4 parallels the same quotation in Galatians 3:11 and Hebrews 10:38

== Prescript (verses 1–7) ==
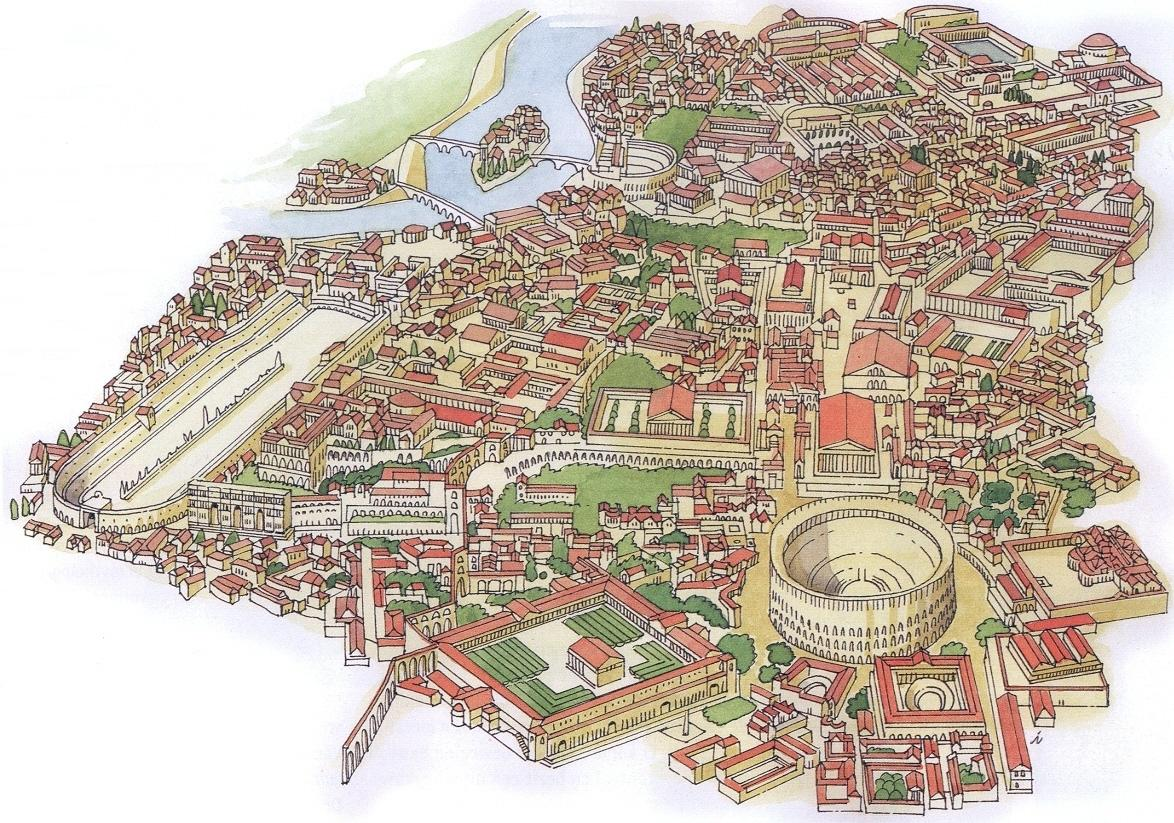
An illustration of ancient Rome.

The letter is addressed "to all those in Rome who are loved by God and called to be saints", and not to "the church in Rome" as such. Protestant theologian Heinrich Meyer refers to "the collective Roman Christian church", whereas Methodist founder John Wesley suggested that the believers in Rome "were scattered up and down in that large city, and not yet reduced into the form of a church".

=== Verse 1 ===
Paul, a bondservant of Jesus Christ, called to be an apostle, separated to the gospel of God.

Craig C. Hill notes that "the Pauline authorship of Romans is not in doubt". The reference to "the gospel of God" in this salutation is distinctive. The phrase appears again in Romans 15:16. William Sanday reflects that the ambiguous genitive, the gospel of God, seems to mean "the gospel which proceeds from God", or "of which God is the author", rather than "the gospel of which God is the object".

== Thanksgiving and occasion (verses 8–15) ==
As with many of the Pauline epistles, Paul's first thoughts are of thanksgiving for the widespread reputation of the faith of the Roman Christians (later, in another epistle, Ignatius of Antioch praises the Church of Rome for never having been envious and for having instructed others) then he expresses his longing to visit and minister to Rome.

=== Verse 8 ===
First, I thank my God through Jesus Christ for you all, that your faith is spoken of throughout the whole world

— Romans 1:8, New King James Version

Paul's thanksgivings in his epistles (Note: See 1 Corinthians 1:4–5; Philippians 1:3; Colossians 1:3; 1 Thessalonians 1:2–3) usually signal important themes in those letters, such as in this verse, he states his obligation to "proclaim the gospel" to the Romans 'as priestly service' (verse 9, cf. Romans 15:16, 15:25). The suggestion that the Roman believers' faith was proclaimed "throughout the whole world" is treated as hyperbole by both Meyer and Sanday. There is a similar expression in Paul's first letter to the Thessalonians, whose "faith in God has gone forth everywhere".

=== Verse 14 ===
I am under obligation both to Greeks and to barbarians, both to the wise and to the foolish.

Paul refers here to the Hellenistic division between Greeks and non-Greeks, spoken of as "barbarians", in place of the distinction between Jews and Gentiles, or Jews and Greeks, which is found elsewhere in his writings, including in verse 16 below. It is not clear whether the distinction between the "wise" and the "foolish" is intended to mirror the distinction between the Greeks and the barbarians, but in any case, Paul is clear that "the gospel transcends such distinctions".

== The theme of the epistle (verses 16–17) ==
In verses 16–17, Paul gives his description of the "gospel", which becomes the central theme (the keyword and the central motif) of the epistle, as well as a transition between the letter opening (1:1–15) and the body (1:18–15:13).

=== Verse 16 ===
For I am not ashamed of the gospel; it is the power of God for salvation to everyone who has faith, to the Jew first and also to the Greek.

— Romans 1:16, New Revised Standard Version

=== Verse 17 ===
For therein is the righteousness of God revealed from faith to faith: as it is written, The just shall live by faith.

— Romans 1:17, King James Version

Romans 1:17 references Habakkuk 2:4 in the phrase "The just shall live by faith" (ὁ δὲ δίκαιος ἐκ πίστεως ζήσεται). The Septuagint of Habakkuk 2:4 has ὁ δὲ δίκαιος ἐκ πίστεώς μου ζήσεται.

The phrase comprising the last three Hebrew words of Habakkuk 2:4 (וצדיק באמונתו יחיה) is cited in Greek three times in the New Testament, all in Pauline epistles – Romans 1:17; Galatians 3:11; and Hebrews 10:38 – "demonstrating its importance to the early church", asserted Dockery.

Moody Smith, Jr. showed that in Romans 1:17, by exegesis of Galatians 3:11 (also quoting Habakkuk 2:4), Paul took the ek pisteos with the verb zesetai not by the subject of the sentence, ho dikaios. This is supported by Qumran interpretation of the text, as well as Paul's contemporaries and more recent commentators, such as Lightfoot.

== God's wrath on the idolaters (verses 18–32) ==
Verses 18–19 function as the "heading" for the exposition that runs to Romans 3:20, that God's wrath falls on all human beings who turn from God and do not follow the truth of God; a consistent picture of a just God who acts to judge sin in both the Old Testament and New Testament. Paul starts first with God's wrath that comes deservedly on the state religion of the Gentiles (20–32), drawn against the background of the fall of the first human beings in to sin.

Several scholars believe verses 18 to 32 (and chapter 2) are a non-Pauline interpolation, but this is a minority position.

=== Verses 19–20 ===
^{19}For what can be known about God is plain to them, because God has shown it to them. ^{20}Ever since the creation of the world his eternal power and divine nature, invisible though they are, have been understood and seen through the things he has made. So they are without excuse.

— Romans 1:19–20, New Revised Standard Version

In verses 19–20, Paul writes about the "knowledge of God". This passage gives one of the important statements in the Bible relating to the concept of 'natural revelation': that other than revealing himself in Christ and in the Scriptures, God reveals himself to everyone through nature and history, and all human beings have the capacity to receive such revelation because they continue to bear the divine image. It echoes what Paul and Barnabas has said to a crowd in Lystra in Acts 14:16-17:

The living God [...] made the heaven, the earth, the sea, and all things that are in them, who in bygone generations allowed all nations to walk in their own ways. Nevertheless He did not leave Himself without witness, in that He did good, gave us rain from heaven and fruitful seasons, filling our hearts with food and gladness.

— Acts 14:16–17, New King James Version

=== Divine abandonment terminology ===
A significant feature in Romans 1:18-32 is the three occurrences of the phrase "God gave them up" (Greek: παρέδωκεν / paradidōmi) in verses 24, 26, and 28. This repetition creates a structural pattern that emphasizes the consequences of rejecting divine revelation. The term implies more than passive withdrawal; it suggests an active handing over to the natural consequences of human choices. This threefold repetition shows a progression in Paul's argument about the consequences of idolatry and rejection of God.

=== The consequences of rejecting God (verses 20–25) ===
Paul begins to explain from verse 18 onwards why the "gospel" (το ευαγγελιον του χριστου, to evangeliou tou Christou) is needed: it is to save humankind, both gentiles and Jews, from the wrath of God (οργη θεου). The wrath of God is explained by Meyer as "the affection of a personal God, [...] the love of the holy God (who is neither neutral nor one-sided in his affection) for all that is good in its energy as antagonistic to all that is evil".

=== Verses 26–27 ===
^{26}For this cause God gave them up unto vile affections: for even their women did change the natural use into that which is against nature: ^{27}And likewise also the men, leaving the natural use of the woman, burned in their lust one toward another; men with men working that which is unseemly, and receiving in themselves that recompense of their error which was meet.

— Romans 1:26–27, King James Version

Commentators' attention has been given to verses 26–27 in relation to homosexuality.

- "gave them up" (also in verse 24; "gave them over" in verse 28) is from the Greek word paradidomi, 'hand over', refers to more than a passive withholding of divine grace on God's part, but as God's reaction to the people who turning from the truth of God and his moral requirements, that is to "turn them over" their own gods and sinful ways as well as the consequences of it (verses 23, 25, 27).
- "the due", "which was meet" (KJV) or "was fitting" (King James 2000 Bible) (ἔδει, edei). Equivalent to "was due", which is better, though the word expresses a necessity in the nature of the case – that which must needs be as the consequence of violating the divine law.
- "penalty" or "recompense" (KJV) (ἀντιμισθίαν, antimisthian); Greek concordance and lexicon define this word as: "a reward, recompense, retribution"; "remunerating, a reward given in compensation, requital, recompense; in a bad sense."

==== Interpretation ====
Verses 26–27 have been debated by 20th- and 21st-century interpreters as to its relevance today and as to what it actually prohibits.

Although Christians of several denominations have historically maintained that this verse is a complete prohibition of all forms of homosexual activity, some scholars and theologians have argued that the passage is not a blanket condemnation of homosexual acts. Additional controversy has arisen over the authentic text of the passage, and whether Romans 1:26–27 was a later addition to the text (and thus not inspired). One perspective sees Romans 1:26–27 as a blanket condemnation of both male and female homosexual activity enduring to the present day. Another perspective sees Romans 1:26 as a blanket condemnation of unnatural heterosexual activity enduring to the present day, such as anal sex, whereas Romans 1:27 is a blanket condemnation of male homosexual activity enduring to the present day.

A minority of scholars have suggested that Romans 1:26–27 is a non-Pauline interpolation. This position can be combined with other perspectives, such as that of blanket condemnation. Others have suggested that the condemnation was relative to Paul's own culture, in which homosexuality was not understood as an orientation and in which being penetrated was seen as shameful, or that it was a condemnation of pagan rituals. Yet others have suggested that the passage condemned heterosexuals who experiment with homosexual activity.

== See also ==
- Epistle to the Romans § The judgment of God (1:18–32)
- Homosexuality in the New Testament
- Related Bible parts: Habakkuk 2, Acts 9, Galatians 3, Hebrews 10

== Sources ==
- Coogan, Michael David (2007). Coogan, Michael David; Brettler, Marc Zvi; Newsom, Carol Ann; Perkins, Pheme (eds.). The New Oxford Annotated Bible with the Apocryphal/Deuterocanonical Books: New Revised Standard Version, Issue 48 (Augmented 3rd ed.). Oxford University Press. ISBN 9780195288810.
- Hill, Craig C. (2007). "64. Romans". In Barton, John; Muddiman, John (eds.). The Oxford Bible Commentary (first (paperback) ed.). Oxford University Press. pp. 1083–1108. ISBN 978-0199277186.
- Moo, Douglas J. (1994). "Romans". In Carson, D. A.; France, R. T.; Motyer, J. A.; Wenham, G. J. (eds.). New Bible Commentary: 21st Century Edition (4, illustrated, reprint, revised ed.). Inter-Varsity Press. pp. 1115–1160. ISBN 9780851106489.
