= Papyrus 40 =

3rd-century Greek manuscript

Papyrus 𝔓^{40}
- New Testament manuscript
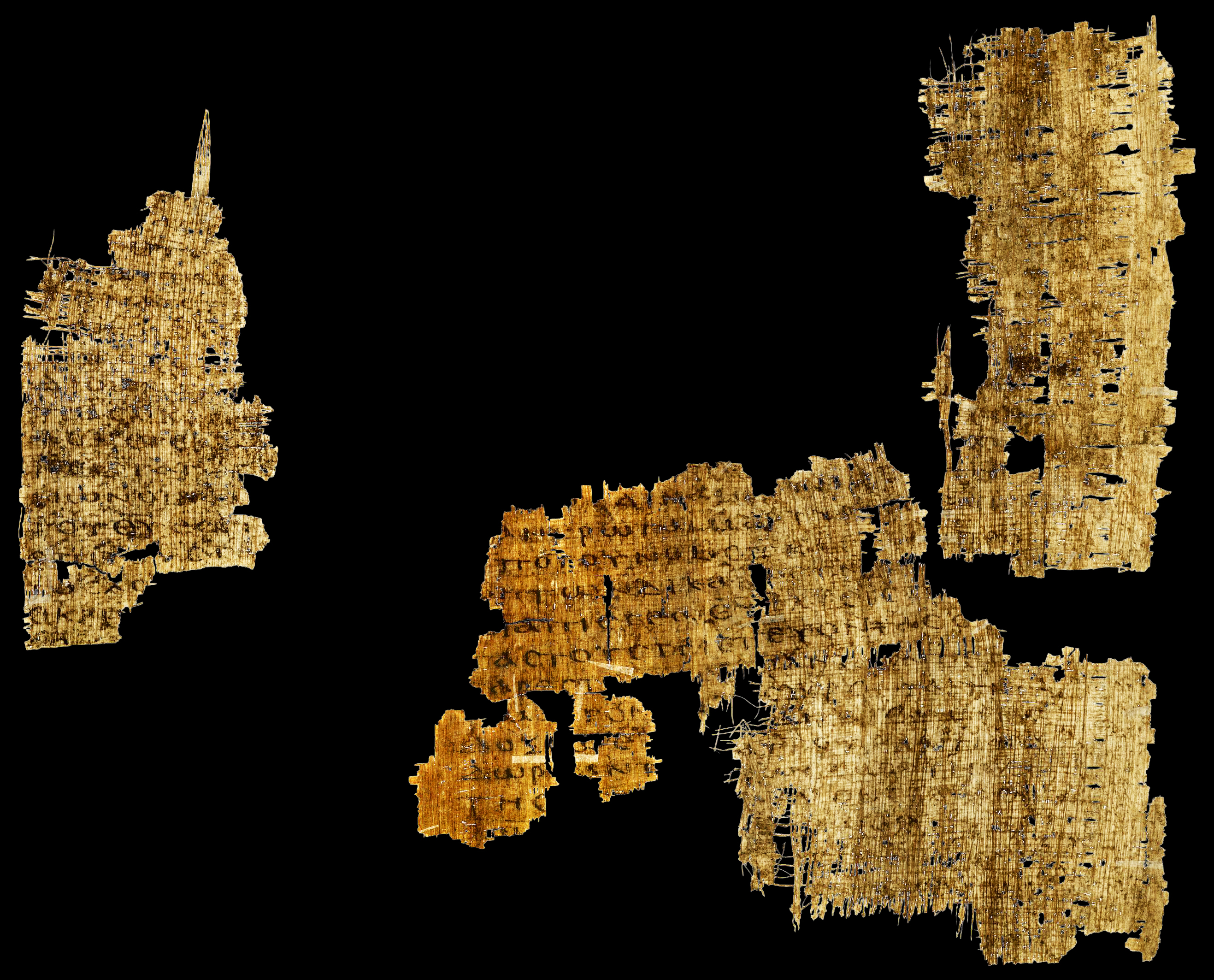
- Fragments a & b recto Romans 3:21–26
- Text: Romans 1–4; 6; 9 †
- Date: 3rd century
- Script: Greek
- Found: Egypt
- Now at: University of Heidelberg
- Cite: F. Bilabel, Römerbrieffragmente, VBP IV (Heidelberg 1924), 28–31
- Type: Alexandrian text-type
- Category: I

Papyrus 40 (in the Gregory-Aland numbering), designated by 𝔓^{40}, is an early copy of the New Testament in Greek. The manuscript paleographically has been assigned to the 3rd century.

== Description ==
It is a papyrus manuscript of the Epistle to the Romans, it contains Romans 1:24-27; 1:31-2:3; 3:21-4:8; 6:4-5.16; 9:16-17.27.

The Greek text of this codex is a representative of the Alexandrian text-type, rather proto-Alexandrian, Aland named it as "Free text", and placed it in Category I because of its date.

This manuscript is closer to Codex Sinaiticus than to Codex Alexandrinus and Vaticanus.

It is currently housed at the Papyrussammlung der Universität in the University of Heidelberg (Inv. no. 45).

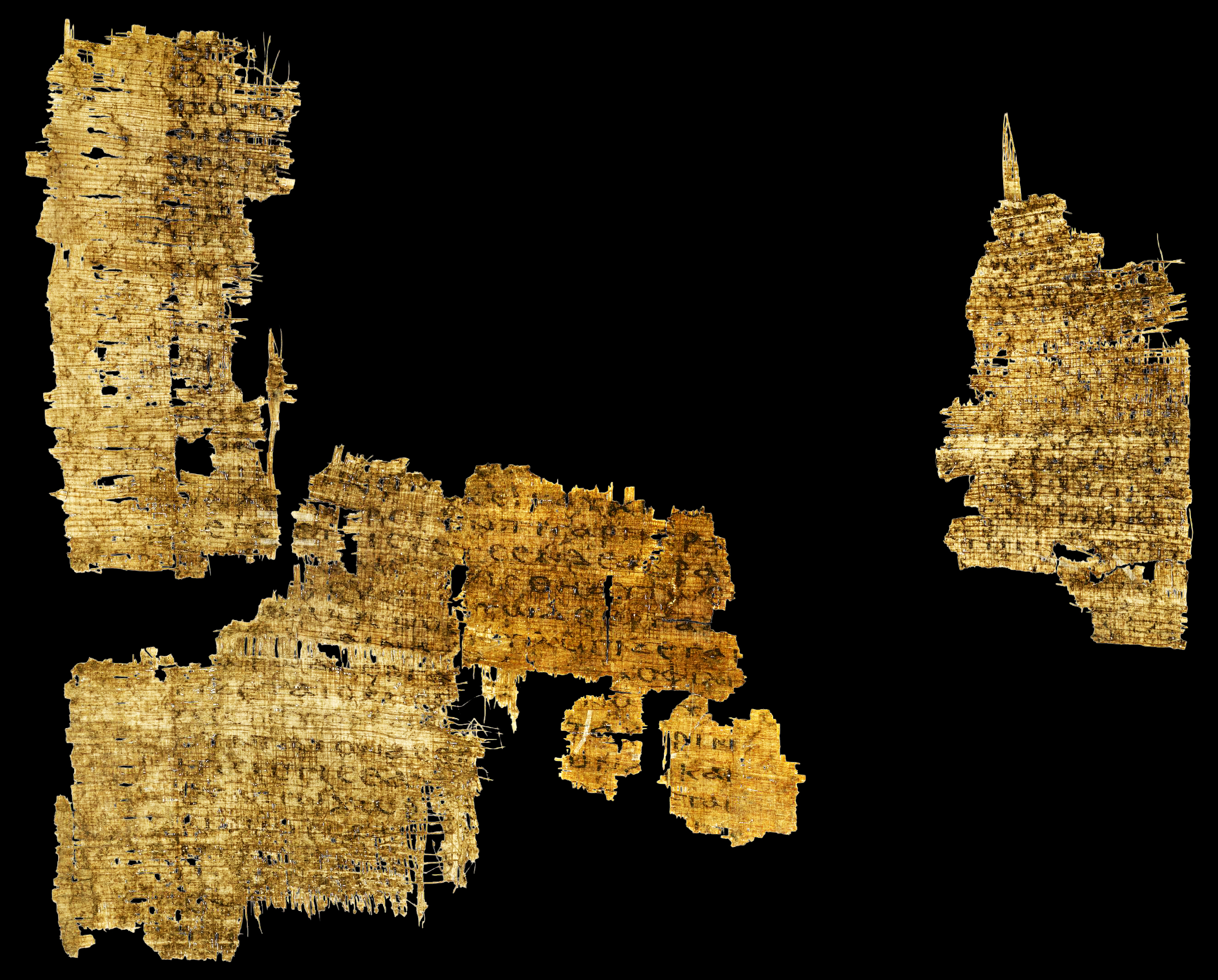
Fragments a & b verso Romans 3:26–4:8

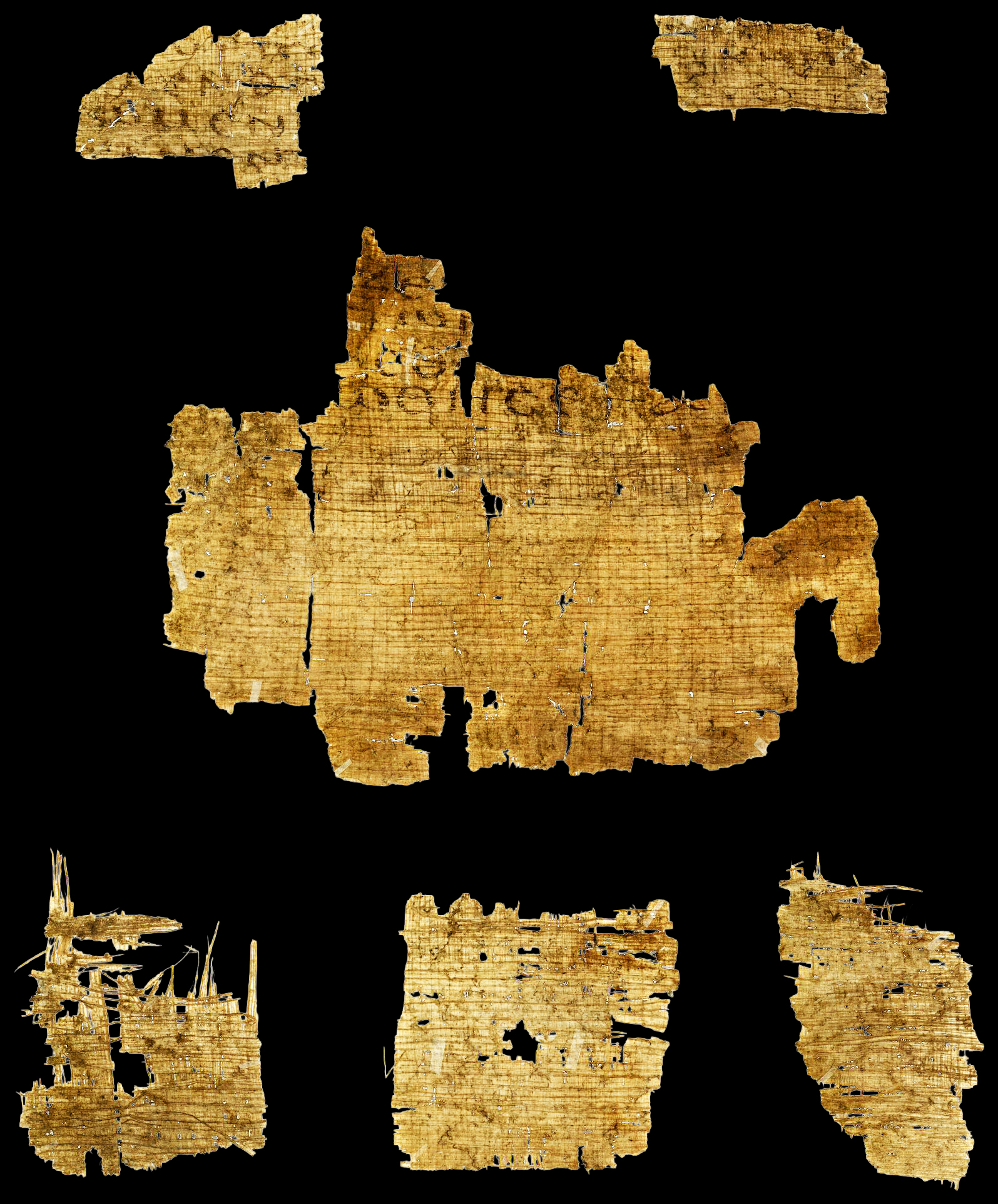
Fragments c–h recto Romans 1:24–27

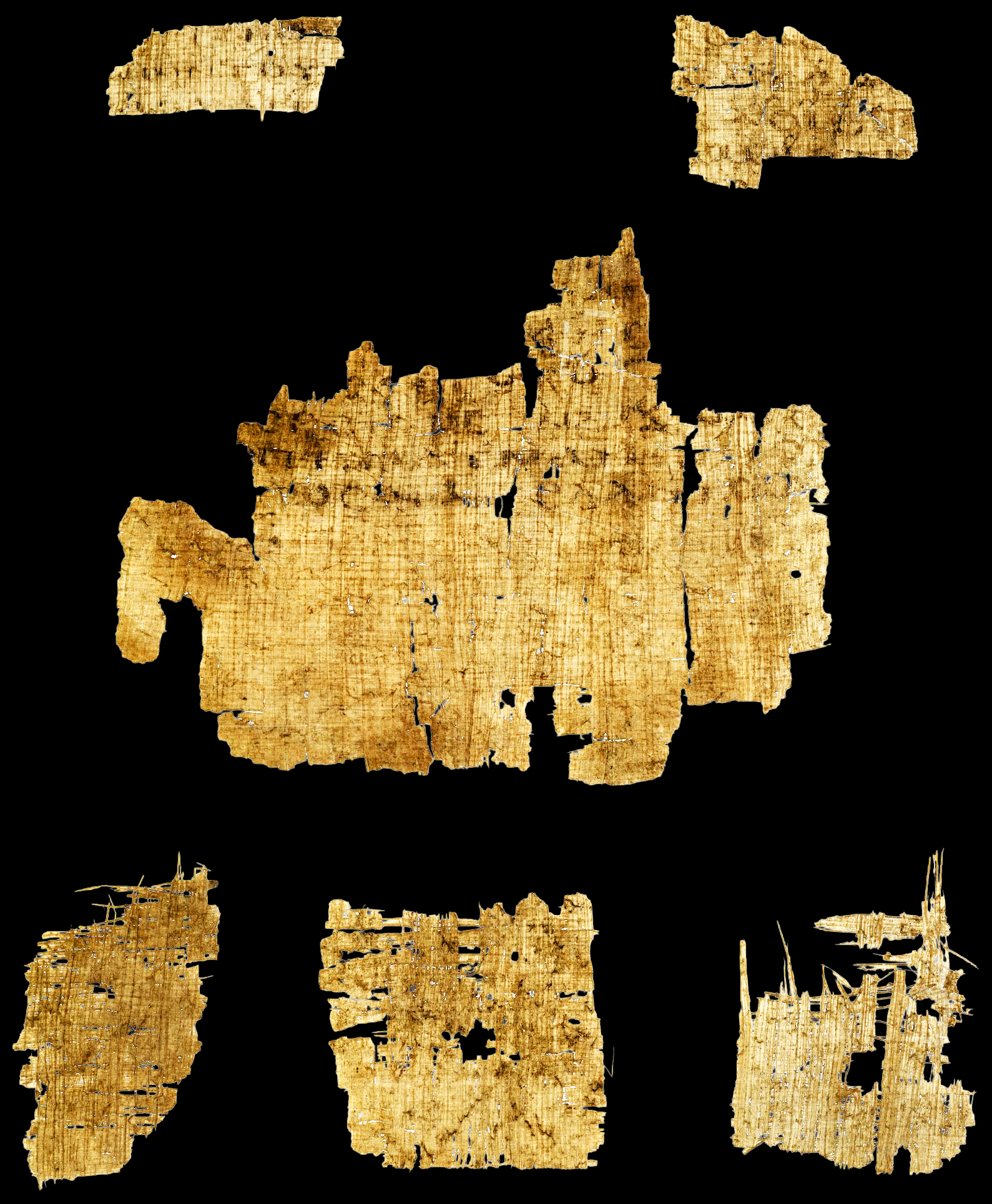
Fragments c–h verso Romans 1:31–2:3

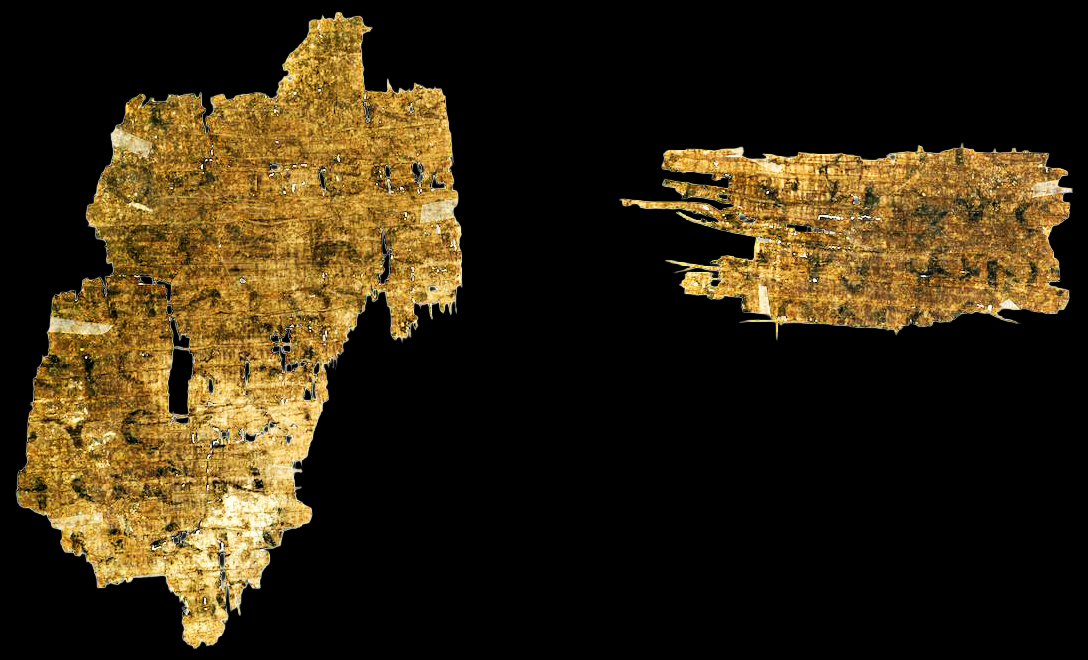
Fragments i & k recto Romans 9:16–17, 27

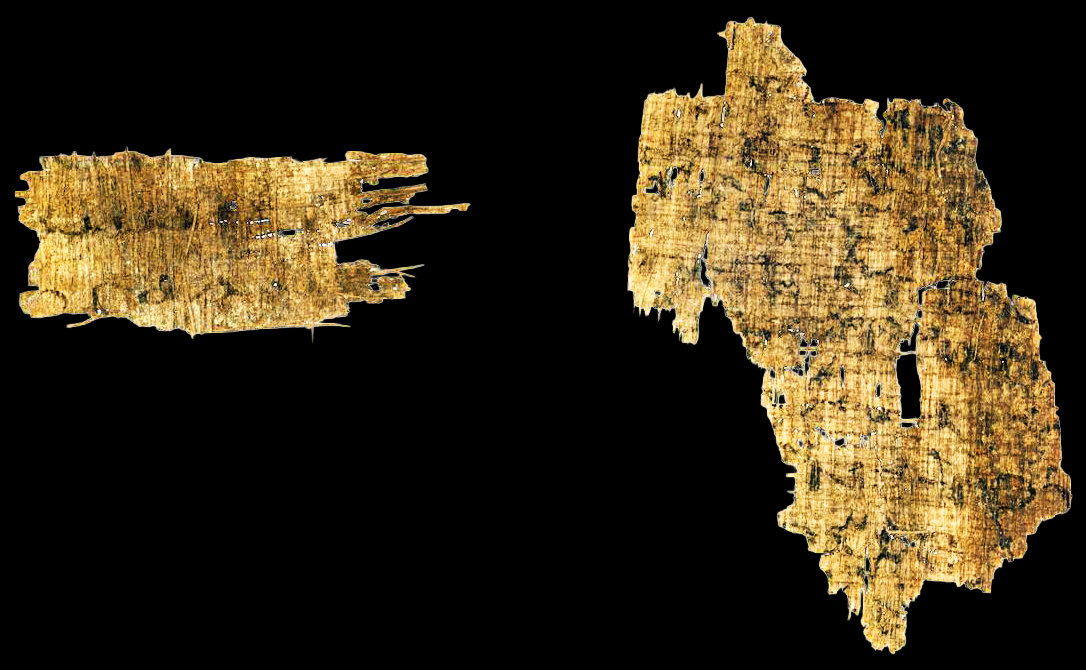
Fragments i & k verso Romans 6:4–5, 6, 16

== See also ==
- List of New Testament papyri
