= Japan Bible Society Interconfessional Version =

Japanese Bible translation, published 2018

- Full name: Japan Bible Society Interconfessional Version
- Other names: Bible Society Joint Translation Bible
- Abbreviation: JBSIV
- Language: Japanese
- OT published: 2018
- NT published: 2018
- Complete Bible published: 2018
- Derived from: New Interconfessional Translation Bible
- Textual basis: OT: Biblia Hebraica Stuttgartensia; Biblia Hebraica Quinta; Deuterocanonicals: Göttingen Septuagint; NT: UBS Greek New Testament (5th ed.); Novum Testamentum Graece (28th ed.)
- Publisher: Japan Bible Society
- Copyright: 2018 by Japan Bible Society, All Rights Reserved.
- Religious affiliation: Ecumenical (Catholic and Protestant)
- Webpage: www.bible.or.jp/online/jbsiv.html
- Genesis 1:1–3 初めに神は天と地を創造された。地は混沌として、闇が深淵の面にあり、神の霊が水の面を動いていた。神は言われた。「光あれ。」すると光があった。 John 3:16 神は、その独り子をお与えになったほどに、世を愛された。御子を信じる者が一人も滅びないで、永遠の命を得るためである。

The Japan Bible Society Interconfessional Version (JBSIV) (Japanese: 聖書協会共同訳聖書, Hepburn: Seisho Kyōkai Kyōdōyaku Seisho, lit. "Bible Society Joint Translation Bible") is a Japanese translation of the Bible published in 2018 by the Japan Bible Society. It is a revision of the New Interconfessional Translation Bible (NIT) of 1987, the first revision in 31 years.

Like the NIT, the JBSIV is an ecumenical translation of the Bible by Japanese Catholic and Protestant Christians. Their aim, as with its predecessor, was to create the standard version of the Bible for the "next generation" of Christians, used for worship and study by both Catholics and Protestants in Japan. The translation team was made up of 60 percent Protestants and 40 percent Catholics.

== History ==
The 1987 translation, despite becoming the most used version of the Bible in Japan with 80 percent of Christians and 70 percent of churches (as well as the entirety of the Catholic Church in Japan) using it, according to a survey by the Japan Bible Society in 2005, was subject to scrutiny in a 2010 questionnaire published by Kirishin (Japanese: キリスト新聞, Hepburn: Kirisuto Shimbun, lit. "The Christ Newspaper") when inconsistencies in the translation of words throughout the text were pointed out and the public expressed interest in a revision in order to improve it. These inconsistencies originated from a sudden shift in translation philosophy, from dynamic equivalence to formal equivalence, partway through the original translation, and even dating back to the 1978 Interconfessional Translation New Testament. The most notable inconsistencies were found in the Gospels, the Book of Job, and the Psalms.

Nevertheless, the Japan Bible Society had for several years before been examining the New Interconfessional Bible text, considering how to create a new Bible translation for the "next generation". The results of this research led them to the Nieuwe Bijbelvertaling (transl. New Bible Translation), a highly acclaimed ecumenical translation of the Bible published by the Netherlands Bible Society in 2004, and to the Skopos theory of translation, which states that each part of the text should be translated according to its original intentions, rather than rigidly literal or loosely dynamic as a one-size-fits-all solution; this theory sought to prevent prose intended to be read literally from being translated too loosely, or poetry or idiomatic language from being translated so literally as to lose its intended original meaning. Upon inviting Professor Lourens de Vries of Vrije Universiteit Amsterdam, a chief proponent of the theory, to discuss it with them, the Japan Bible Society formally adopted the theory as the translation philosophy for their future translation in order to achieve a "prestigious and beautiful Japanese that is suitable for reading in worship services."

In 2009, the board of directors of the Japan Bible Society officially decided to undertake the revision of the NIT Bible and, on March 2, 2010, they held a press conference to announce the start of the translation project that would result in the JBSIV, which would be completed in 2017 after eight years of work, and published in 2018.

According to the annual report by the Japan Bible Society for the year 2019, published in 2020, 31 percent of all Bibles distributed by them were the JBSIV translation; still 63 percent were the NIT.

== See also ==
- Japanese New Interconfessional Translation Bible
- Bible translations
- Bible translations into Japanese
- Christianity in Japan
- Catholic Church in Japan
