= Bible translations into Japanese =

There are two main translations of the Bible into Japanese widely in use today—the Japanese New Interconfessional Version (新共同訳聖書) and the New Japanese Bible (新改訳聖書). The New Japanese Bible, published by the Organization for the New Japanese Bible Translation (新日本聖書刊行会) and distributed by Inochinokotoba-sha (いのちのことば社), aims to be a literal translation using modern Japanese, while the New Interconfessional Version, published by the Japan Bible Society, aims to be ecumenically used by all Christian denominations and must therefore conform to various theologies. Protestant Evangelicals most often use the New Japanese Bible, but the New Interconfessional Version is the most widely distributed and the one used by the Catholic Church, the United Church of Christ, Lutheran Church factions and many Anglicans in Japan.

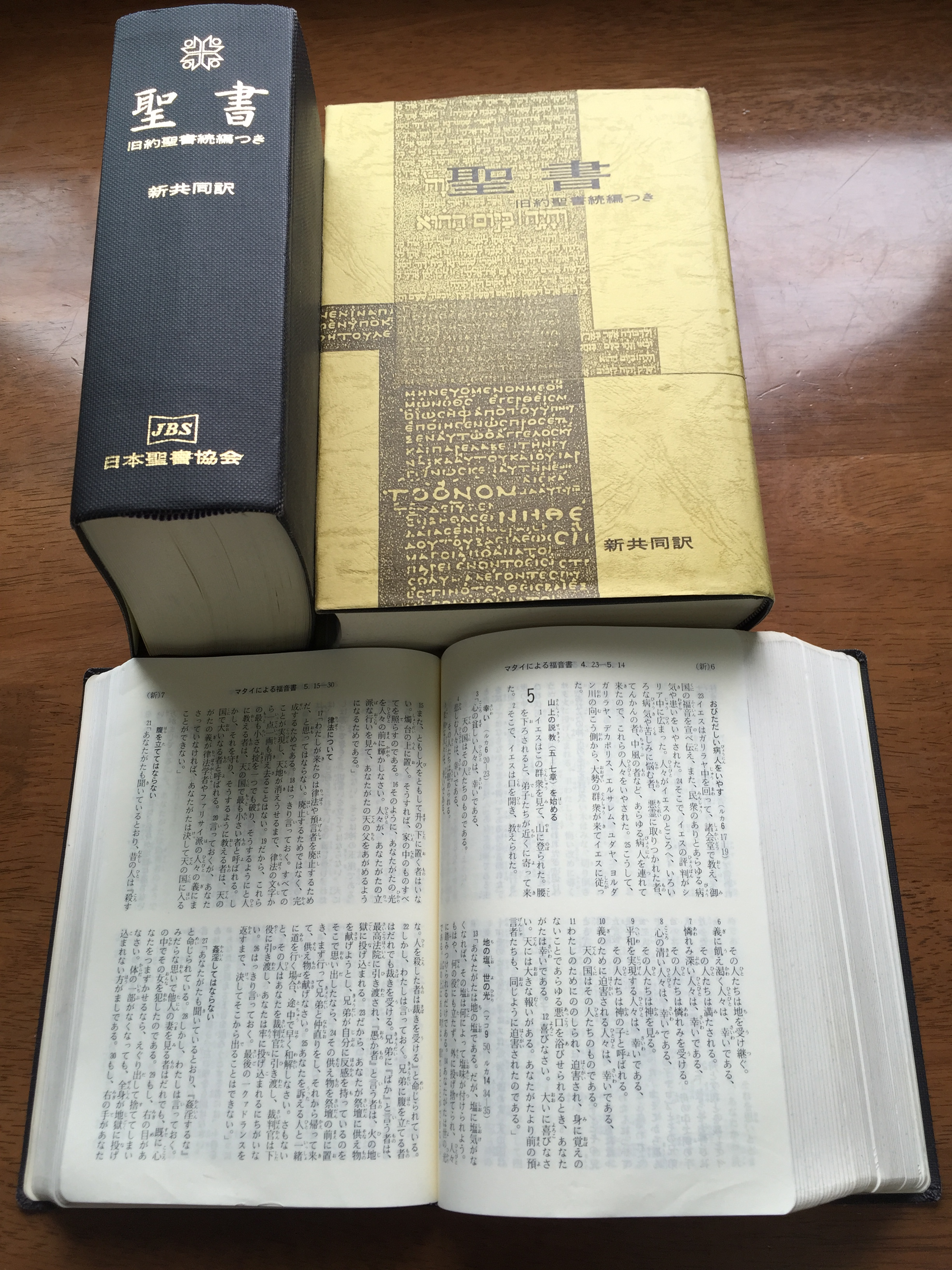
New Interconfessional Version

== Jesuit missions ==
Japanese Bible translation began when Catholic missionaries (Kirishitan) entered Japan in 1549. In 1613, Jesuits published portions of the New Testament in Kyoto, though no copies survive. Gospels for the Sundays of the year and other Bible pericopes were translated, but it is unknown exactly how much else was translated. This translation of the Bible is now lost. Shortly afterwards, Christianity was banned and the missionaries were exiled.

== Protestant missionaries ==
Work on translation started outside Japan in the 19th century by Protestant missionaries interested in Japan. Karl Gutzlaff of the London Missionary Society translated the Gospel of John in Macau in 1837, referring to the Chinese version of Robert Morrison (Chinese Shentian Shengshu 神天聖書). Bernard Jean Bettelheim, who had been a missionary in the Ryūkyū Kingdom (Okinawa) and who had been exiled, translated the Bible to Ryūkyūan and published the Gospel of Luke and John, Acts of the Apostles and the Epistle to the Romans in Hong Kong in 1855. Japan re-opened in 1858, and many missionaries came into the country. They found that intellectuals could read Chinese texts easily, so they used Chinese Bibles at first. However, the proportion of intellectuals was only about 2%; thus, in order to spread their religion across the country more effectively, a Japanese Bible became necessary.

A bilingual version of the Gospel of Luke was published in 1858. Intended for missionary use in Japan, it contained a revision of Bettelheim's Luke next to the Chinese Delegates' Bible version. Because the translation was heavily influenced by Ryukyuan languages, it proved just as unsuitable as Chinese-only Bibles. After immigrating to the United States, Bettelheim continued work on his translations, and newly revised editions of Luke, John, and the Acts now closer to Japanese than Ryūkyūan, were published posthumously in Vienna in 1873–1874 with the assistance of August Pfizmaier.

=== Meiji Original Version, 1887 ===
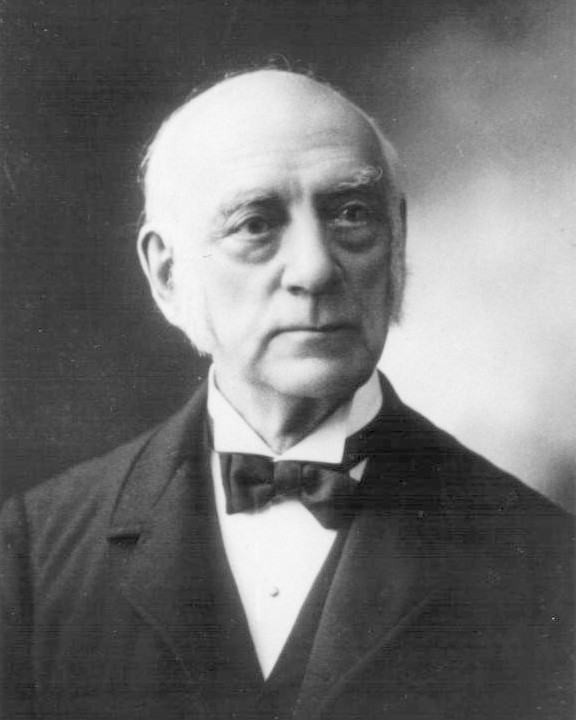
James Curtis Hepburn

A translation was done by James Curtis Hepburn of the Presbyterian Mission and Samuel Robbins Brown of the Reformed Church of America. It is presumed that Japanese intellectual assistants helped translate Bridgman and Culbertson's Chinese Bible (1861) into Japanese, and Hepburn and Brown adjusted the phrases. The Gospels of Mark, Matthew and John were published in 1872. Hepburn's project was taken over by a Missionary Committee, sponsored by the American Bible Society, British and Foreign Bible Society and the Scottish Bible Society in Tokyo. Their New Testament and Old Testament, called the Meiji Original Version (明治元訳聖書 meiji genyaku seisho, "Meiji era Original Translation of Scripture"), was published in 1880 and 1887 respectively. They translated from a Greek text as well as the King James Version.

=== Taisho Revised Version, 1917 ===
A revision of the New Testament, the Taisho Revised Version (大正改訳聖書, taisho kaiyaku seisho; "Taisho era Revised Translation of Scripture"), appeared in 1917 during the Taishō period. This version was widely read even outside of Christian society. Its phrases are in pre-modern style, but the translation became popular in Japan nonetheless. It was based on the Nestle-Åland Greek Text and the English Revised Version (RV).

=== Bible, Japanese Colloquial, 1954, 1955, 1975, 1984, 2002 ===
After World War II, the Japan Bible Society (日本聖書協会, nihon seisho kyōkai) translated the "Bible, Japanese Colloquial (口語訳聖書, kōgoyaku seisho)". The New Testament was ready in 1954 and the Old Testament in 1955. It was adopted by certain Protestant churches but never became very popular. It was considered to have been written in a poor literary style. This translation was based on the Revised Standard Version (RSV).

=== Japanese Living Bible, 1977, 1993, 2016 ===
Based on The Living Bible, this translation uses an informal literary style which attempts to capture the meaning of the original texts in modern Japanese. A revised version released in 2016 by Word of Life press.

=== New Japanese Bible, 1965, 1970, 1978, 2003, 2017 ===
In 1970, the NSK (日本聖書刊行会, nihon seisho kankōkai) – not to be confused with the Japan Bible Society (日本聖書協会, nihon seisho kyōkai) – released the first edition of the New Japanese Bible (新改訳聖書, shin kaiyaku seisho; "New Revised Version of the Bible") which was translated from Hebrew, Aramaic and Greek (Biblia Hebraica Stuttgartensia and Nestle-Åland Novum Testamentum Graece). The Shin Kaiyaku aimed to translate theologically difficult passages in a way that was linguistically accurate to the source texts, to strike a balance between word-for-word and thought-for-thought while erring toward a literal translation.

The latest edition was released in 2017.

=== New Interconfessional Translation/Interconfessional Version, 1987, 1988, 2018 ===
The Second Vatican Council decided to promote ecumenism and emphasized respect for the Bible. Consortia between the Catholic and the Protestant churches were organized and translation projects were started in many countries, including Japan. The collaboration committee published the Interconfessional Translation Bible (共同訳聖書, kyōdō yaku seisho) of the New Testament in 1978, but it was not widely supported by both congregations. The committee then published a revised version in 1987, the New Interconfessional Translation Bible (新共同訳聖書, shin kyōdō yaku seisho), which included the Old Testament. It has been widely distributed by various organisations (such as Gideons International). The next edition was planned to be released in 2016.

After the 1987 text was published, inconsistencies were discovered and the public expressed interest in a revision. The board of directors of the Japan Bible Society officially decided in 2009 to undertake the revision of the New Interconfessional Translation Bible, the first revision in 31 years. On 2 March 2010, they held a press conference to announce the start of the translation project. The translation work was completed in 2017, and the result was published in 2018 as the Japan Bible Society Interconfessional Version (聖書協会共同訳聖書, seisho kyōkai kyōdōyaku seisho). Taking advantage of the Skopos theory of translation, it sought to serve the "next generation" of Christians while presenting the text in a "dignified Japanese suitable for reading in worship."

== Other translators ==
There are many other Japanese translations of the Bible by various organizations and individuals.

=== Catholic versions ===
In the Catholic Church, Emile Raguet of the MEP translated the New Testament from the Vulgate Latin version and published it in 1910. It was treated as the standard text by Japanese Catholics.

Federico Barbaro created a colloquialized version, which was published in 1957. He went on to translate the Old Testament in 1964.

The Franciscans completed a translation of the whole Bible, based on the Greek and Hebrew text, in 1978. This project was inspired by the Jerusalem Bible.

=== Orthodox versions ===
In the Eastern Orthodox Church, Nicholas and Tsugumaro Nakai translated the New Testament as an official text in 1901.

Some, such as Protestant Fujihara Fujio, have criticized the style of the 1901 translation. In the 1930s, Orthodox Christians called for the translation to be revised, as they felt that the translation was difficult to understand. However, in an effort to ensure the accuracy of the translation, Nicholas opposed any such changes.

In modern times, the 1954 Colloquial Translation is often used instead.

=== Jehovah's Witnesses, 1973, 1985, 2019 ===
Japanese was among the first eight languages into which the New World Translation was translated. Jehovah's Witnesses first released the Japanese New World Translation as 「クリスチャン･ギリシャ語聖書 新世界訳｣ (New World Translation of the Christian Greek Scriptures) in 1973. This Bible, however, contains Christian Greek Scriptures only. In 1982, a complete Japanese Bible, the 新世界訳聖書 (New World Translation of the Holy Scriptures), was released. By the end of the year, tens of thousands of copies had been printed in Japan. Not long after, in 1985, another edition of the Japanese New World translation was released; this release also included the new Reference Bible. Both the Standard and Reference editions were based on the English 1984 edition of the New World Translation of the Holy Scriptures, which was released in the United States in 1985.

In 2019, a member of the Governing Body of Jehovah's Witnesses, Stephen Lett, released a revised edition of the New World Translation of the Holy Scriptures with the same name. This translation was based from the English 2013 revision of the New World Translation of the Holy Scriptures. This revised edition in Japanese includes the use of more modern and understandable language, clarified Biblical expression, and appendices, among other changes.

== Comparison ==
Translation	John 3:16
Japan Bible Society Interconfessional Version (2018)（ja:聖書協会共同訳聖書）	神は、その独り子をお与えになったほどに、世を愛された。御子を信じる者が一人も滅びないで、永遠の命を得るためである。
New Revised Version (2017)（ja:新改訳聖書）	神は、実に、そのひとり子をお与えになったほどに世を愛された。それは御子を信じる者が、一人として滅びることなく、永遠のいのちを持つためである。
The New Interconfessional Translation (1987)（ja:新共同訳聖書）	神は、その独り子をお与えになったほどに、世を愛された。独り子を信じる者が一人も滅びないで、永遠の命を得るためである。
New Japanese Bible (1965)（ja:新改訳聖書）	神は、実に、そのひとり子をお与えになったほどに、世を愛された。それは御子を信じる者が、ひとりとして滅びることなく、永遠のいのちを持つためである。
Japanese Colloquial Bible (1954)（ja:口語訳聖書）	神はそのひとり子を賜わったほどに、この世を愛して下さった。それは御子を信じる者がひとりも滅びないで、永遠の命を得るためである。

Translation	John 1 (verses vary)
Gutzlaff (1837)	John 1:1–2 ハジマリニ カシコイモノゴザル、コノカシコイモノ ゴクラクトトモニゴザル、コノカシコイモノワゴクラク。ハジマリニ コノカシコイモノ ゴクラクトトモニゴザル。
Bettelheim "Loochooan" version (Hong Kong, 1855)	John 1:1–2 ハジマリニ カシコイモノ ヲテ， コノカシコイモノヤ シヤウテイトトモニヲタン。 コノ カシコイモノ ハジマリニ シヤウテイト トモニ ヲタン。
Hepburn (1872)	John 1:1–4 元始(はじめ)に言霊(ことだま)あり 言霊は神とともにあり 言霊ハ神なり。この言霊ハはじめに神とともにあり。よろづのものこれにてなれり なりしものハこれにあらでひとつとしてなりしものハなし。これに生(いのち)ありし いのちは人のひかりなりし。
Bettelheim revised (hiragana) version (Vienna, 1873)	John 1:1–2 はじめに かしこいものあり かしこいものハ 神と ともにいます かしこいものハすなわち神
Meiji version (1880)	John 1:3 万物(よろづのもの)これに由(より)て造(つく)らる造(つくら)れたる者に一つとして之に由(よ)らで造られしは無(なし)
Orthodox church Translation(1902)	John 1:1–3 太初(はじめ)に言(ことば)有り、言は神(かみ)と共に在り、言は即(すなはち)神なり。 是(こ)の言は太初に神と共に在り。万物(ばんぶつ)は彼に由(より)て造(つく)られたり、凡(およそ)造(つく)られたる者には、一(いつ)も彼に由(よ)らずして造られしは無し。
Taisho Revised Version (1917)	John 1:1–3 太初(はじめ)に言(ことば)あり、言(ことば)は神と偕(とも)にあり、言(ことば)は神なりき。この言(ことば)は太初(はじめ)に神とともに在(あ)り、萬(よろづ)の物これに由(よ)りて成り、成りたる物に一つとして之によらで成りたるはなし。
Shinkeiyaku(Nagai)version (1928)	John 1:1–4 初に言(ことば)ありき、また言は神と偕(とも)にありき、また言は神なりき。 此の者は初に神と偕にありき。 すべての物、彼によりて刱(はじ)まれり、また刱まりたる物に、一つとして彼を離れて刱まりしはなし。 彼に生(いのち)ありき、また此の生は人の光なりき。
Colloquial version (1954)	John 1:1–3 初めに言(ことば)があった。言(ことば)は神と共にあった。言(ことば)は神であった。この言(ことば)は初めに神と共にあった。すべてのものは、これによってできた。できたもののうち、一つとしてこれによらないものはなかった。
Barbaro (1957)	John 1:1–3 はじめにみことばがあった。みことばは神とともにあった。みことばは神であった。かれは、はじめに神とともにあり、万物はかれによってつくられた。つくられた物のうち、一つとしてかれによらずつくられたものはない。
Shinkaiyaku Seisho (1973)	John 1:1–3 初めに、ことばがあった。ことばは神とともにあった。ことばは神であった。この方は、初めに神とともにおられた。すべてのものは、この方によって造られた。造られたもので、この方によらずにできたものは一つもない。
Franciscan (1978)	John 1:1–3 初めにみ言葉があった。／み言葉は神と共にあった。／み言葉は神であった。／み言葉は初めに神と共にあった。／すべてのものは、み言葉によってできた。／できたもので、み言葉によらずに／できたものは、何一つなかった。
The New Interconfessional Translation (1987)	John 1:1–3 初めに言があった。言は神と共にあった。言は神であった。この言は、初めに神と共にあった。万物は言によって成った。成ったもので、言によらずに成ったものは何一つなかった。
Japanese Living Bible (2016)	John 1:1–4 まだこの世界に何もない時から、キリストは神と共におられました。キリストは、いつの時代にも生きておられます。キリストは神だからです。 このキリストが、すべてのものをお造りになりました。そうでないものは一つもありません。 キリストには永遠のいのちがあります。全人類に光を与えるいのちです。
New Revised Version (2017)	John 1:1–4 初めにことばがあった。ことばは神とともにあった。ことばは神であった。この方は、初めに神とともにおられた。すべてのものは、この方によって造られた。造られたもので、この方によらずにできたものは一つもなかった。この方にはいのちがあった。このいのちは人の光であった。
Japan Bible Society Interconfessional Version (2018)	John 1:1–3 初めに言があった。言は神と共にあった。言は神であった。この言は、初めに神と共にあった。万物は言によって成った。言によらずに成ったものは何一つなかった。言の内に成ったものは、命であった。この命は人の光であった。
New World Translation (2019)	John 1:1–4 初めに，言葉と呼ばれる方がいた。言葉は神と共にいて，言葉は神のようだった。 この方は初めに神と共にいた。 全てのものはこの方を通して存在するようになり，彼を通さずに存在するようになったものは一つもない。
