= Japanese New Interconfessional Translation Bible =

Japanese Bible translation, published 1987

Japanese New Interconfessional Version
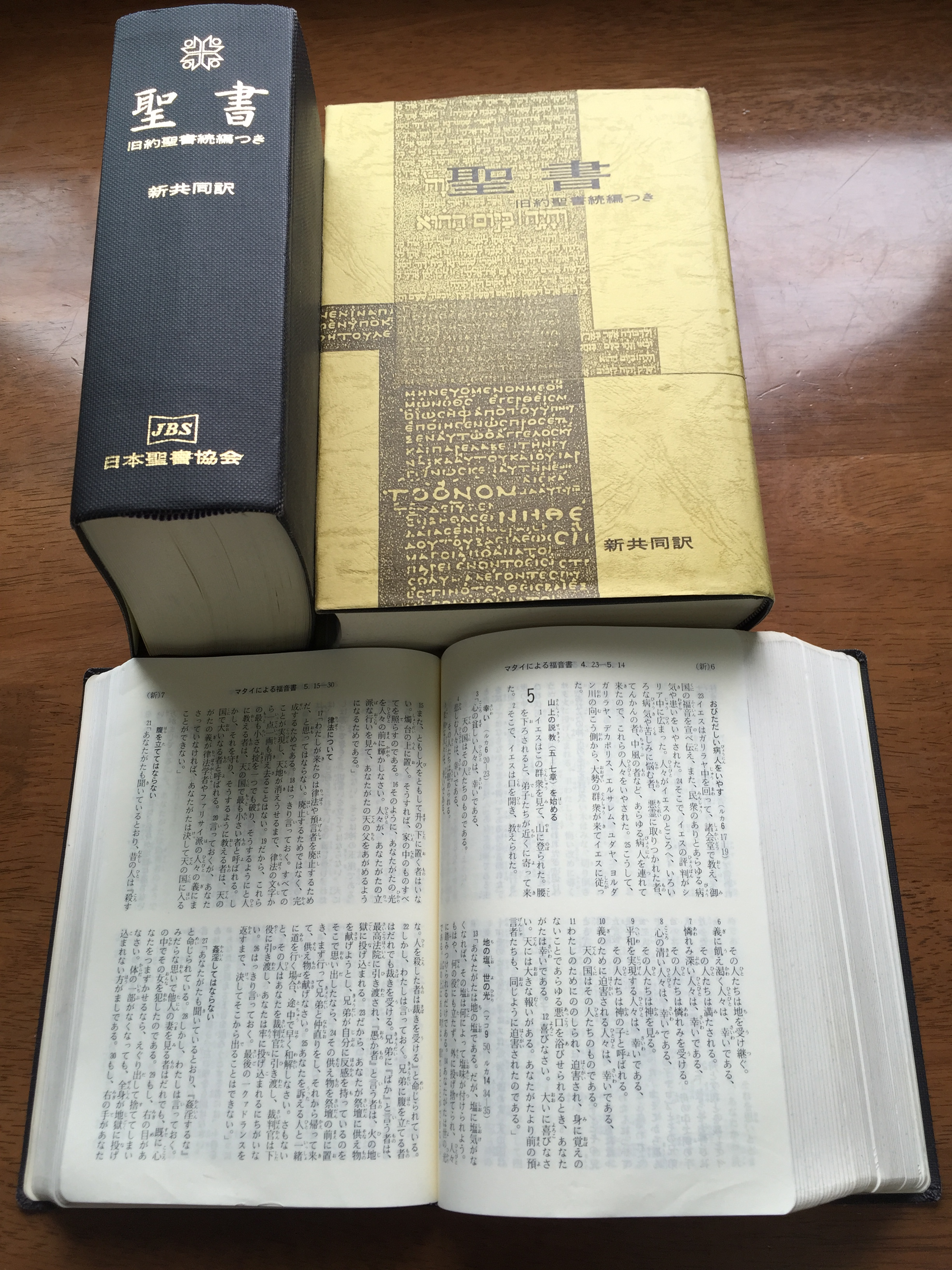
- Full name: New Interconfessional Translation Bible
- Abbreviation: NIT
- Language: Japanese
- OT published: 1987
- NT published: 1987
- Complete Bible published: 1987
- Publisher: Japan Bible Society
- Religious affiliation: Ecumenical (Catholic and Protestant)
- Genesis 1:1–3 初めに、神は天地を創造された。 John 3:16 神は、その独り子をお与えになったほどに、世を愛された。独り子を信じる者が一人も滅びないで、永遠の命を得るためである。

The New Interconfessional Translation Bible (Japanese: 新共同訳聖書, Hepburn: Shin Kyōdō Yaku Seisho, lit. "New Joint Translation Bible") is a Japanese translation of the Christian Bible, completed in 1987, and is currently the most widely used Japanese Bible, by both Catholics and Protestants.

== Joint ecumenical effort ==
In accordance with the ecumenical movement of the latter half of the 20th century, a joint ecumenical translation committee was set up in 1969 to get a new translation of the Bible, so it can be used by all Christian denominations.

== Interconfessional Translation Bible ==
Its New Testament translation, called the Interconfessional Translation Bible (Japanese: 共同訳聖書, Hepburn: Kyōdō Yaku Seisho) was completed in 1978. However, for example, its local pronunciation rule of the people and place names, such as "Yesusu" (Jesus) and "Paurosu" (Paul), when used in worship, created some confusions and problems.

== New Interconfessional Translation Bible ==
The committee, therefore, made necessary adjustments, such as "Yesu" (Jesus) and "Pauro" (Paul), and continued the translation work. In 1987, both Old and New Testaments were published as the New Interconfessional Translation Bible.

== Original Bible texts ==
It is a complete Bible translation, of the Old and New Testaments and the Deuterocanonical books. The original texts used are: Biblia Hebraica Stuttgartensia in Hebrew for the Old Testament, Nestle-Åland Novum Testamentum Graece in Greek, and the Greek Old Testament for the Deuterocanonical books.

== Publication ==
Its publication is done by Japan Bible Society (日本聖書協会), a member of the United Bible Societies (UBS). It is published in various forms, such as the whole Old and New Testament book, Old Testament only book, New Testament only book, Old Testament with or without the Deuterocanonical books, Japanese translation with the English translation (Good News Bible (TEV) or New International Version (NIV)), with the Korean translation, etc.

== Use in churches ==
It is now the most widely read Japanese Bible, by both Catholics and Protestants. It is used by Catholic churches, Anglican/Episcopal churches, Lutheran churches, United Church of Christ churches and other churches. It is not used by the Japanese Orthodox Church because they, although participated in the translation committee initially, later backed out and did not approve its use in the church.

The other Japanese Bible translation often used is the New Japanese Bible (Japanese: 新改訳聖書, Hepburn: Shin Kaiyaku Seisho), first published in 1970, mainly by the Evangelical Protestants. The Bible, Colloquial Japanese (Japanese: 口語訳聖書, Hepburn: Kōgo Yaku Seisho), first published in 1955, is Japan's first effort to translate the Bible in compliance with the modern Japanese writing system that went into effect right after World War II and is now much less used.

== 2018 Revision ==
In 2018, after eight years of work, the Japan Bible Society published the first revision of the New Interconfessional Translation Bible in 31 years, the Japan Bible Society Interconfessional Version (Japanese: 聖書協会共同訳聖書, Hepburn: Seisho Kyōkai Kyōdōyaku Seisho). The aim of the revision was to create a Bible with "prestigious and beautiful Japanese that is suitable for reading in worship services" and to correct issues that had arisen due to the use of both dynamic and formal equivalence translation methods.

== See also ==
- Bible translations
- Bible translations into Japanese
- Christianity in Japan
- Catholic Church in Japan
