= Japan Bible Society =

Japanese nondenominational Christian organization

The Japan Bible Society (日本聖書協会, Nihon Seisho Kyōkai) is a nondenominational Christian organization committed to translating and distributing the Bible in Japan. It was established in 1937 with the help of National Bible Society of Scotland (NBSS, now called the Scottish Bible Society), the American Bible Society, and the British and Foreign Bible Society.

About 2,390,000 copies of the Japanese translation of the Bible were distributed in Japan from 1945 to 1948. The "10 million Bible distribution movement" was influential in the country from 1949 to 1951.

In 1969, the Japan Bible Society became an independently managed organization, no longer seeking financial support from its sister societies in the West. They claim about one million Bibles are sold in Japan every year, including a manga Bible.

== See also ==
- Christianity in Japan
