= Orgelbüchlein =

Set of musical compositions for organ by Johann Sebastian Bach

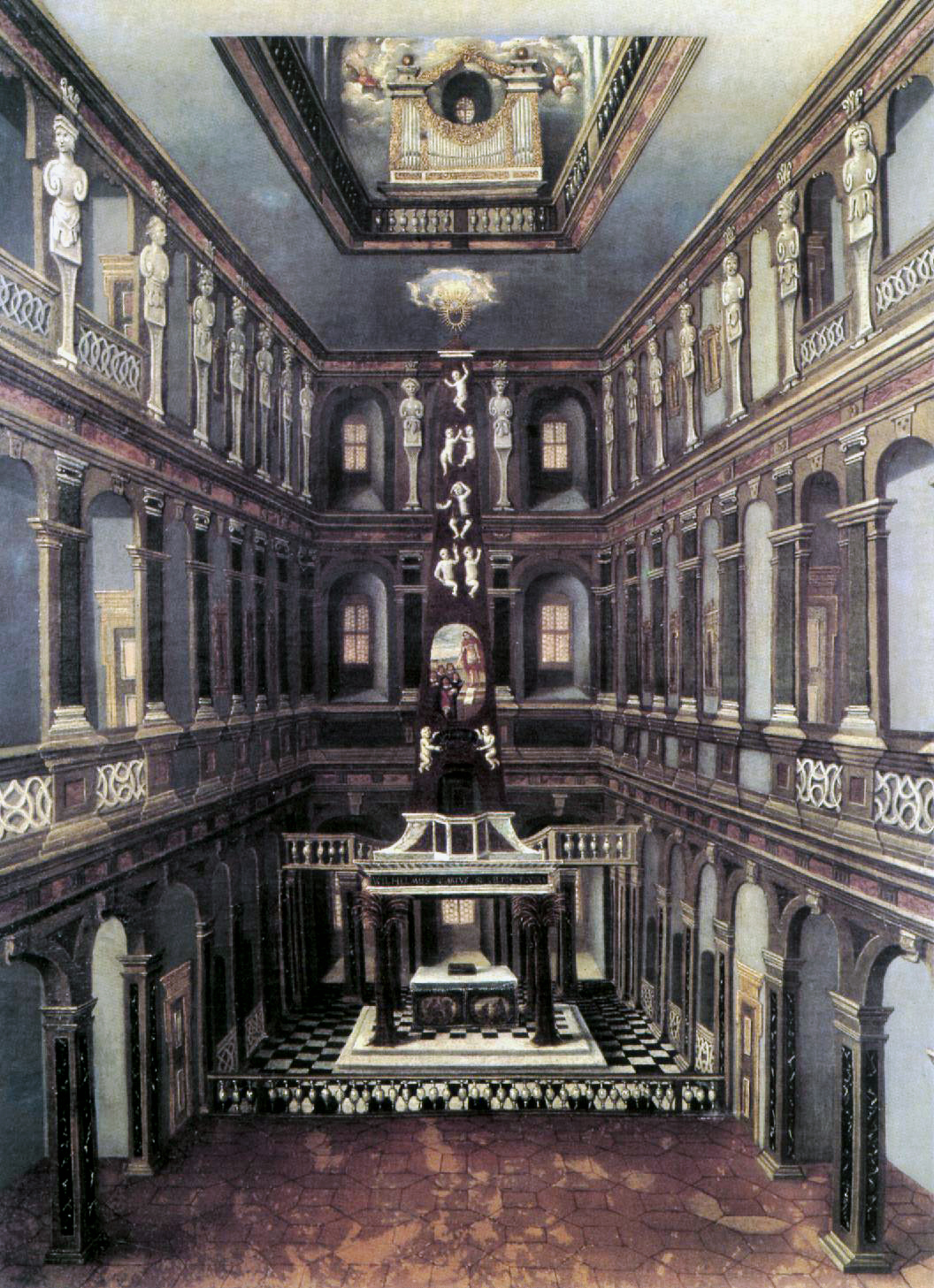
The court chapel at the Schloss in Weimar where Bach was court organist. The organ loft is visible at the top of the picture.

The Orgelbüchlein (Little Organ Book), BWV 599−644, is a set of 46 chorale preludes – one given in two versions – for organ by Johann Sebastian Bach. All but three were written between 1708 and 1717 when Bach served as organist to the ducal court in Weimar; the remainder and a short two-bar fragment came no earlier than 1726, after the composer's appointment as cantor at the Thomasschule in Leipzig.

Bach's apparent plan was for a collection of 164 settings of chorale tunes sung during the Church year so that each part of the year was represented. However, only 46 of these were completed. The manuscript, which is now in the Staatsbibliothek, leaves a number of tunes as missing or "ghost" pieces. A project to complete the missing chorales called "The Orgelbüchlein Project" has been launched in the 21st century, where the chorales are written in modern styles. This project took nine hours in the first complete performance, giving an idea of the potential scope of Bach's "little" book. The Orgelbüchlein as Bach left it contains about 80 minutes of music which span the liturgical calendar.

Each setting takes a Lutheran chorale, adds a motivic accompaniment, and quite freely explores form. Most of the preludes are short, setting only a single verse of the chorale, and use four contrapuntal voices. All have a pedal part, some requiring only a single keyboard and pedal, with an unadorned cantus firmus. Others involve two keyboards and pedal. These include several canons, four ornamental four-part preludes with elaborately decorated chorale lines, and one prelude in trio sonata form.

A further step towards perfecting this form was taken by Bach when he made the contrapuntal elements in his music a means of reflecting certain emotional aspects of the words. Pachelbel had not attempted this; he lacked the fervid feeling which would have enabled him thus to enter into his subject. And it is entering into it, and not a mere depicting of it. For, once more be it said, in every vital movement of the world external to us we behold the image of a movement within us; and every such image must react upon us to produce the corresponding emotion in that inner world of feeling.

— Philipp Spitta, 1873, writing about the Orgelbüchlein in Volume I of his biography of Bach

Here Bach has realised the ideal of the chorale prelude. The method is the most simple imaginable and at the same time the most perfect. Nowhere is the Dürer-like character of his musical style so evident as in these small chorale preludes. Simply by the precision and the characteristic quality of each line of the contrapuntal motive he expresses all that has to be said, and so makes clear the relation of the music to the text whose title it bears.

— Albert Schweitzer, Jean-Sebastien Bach, le musicien-poête, 1905

== Title page ==
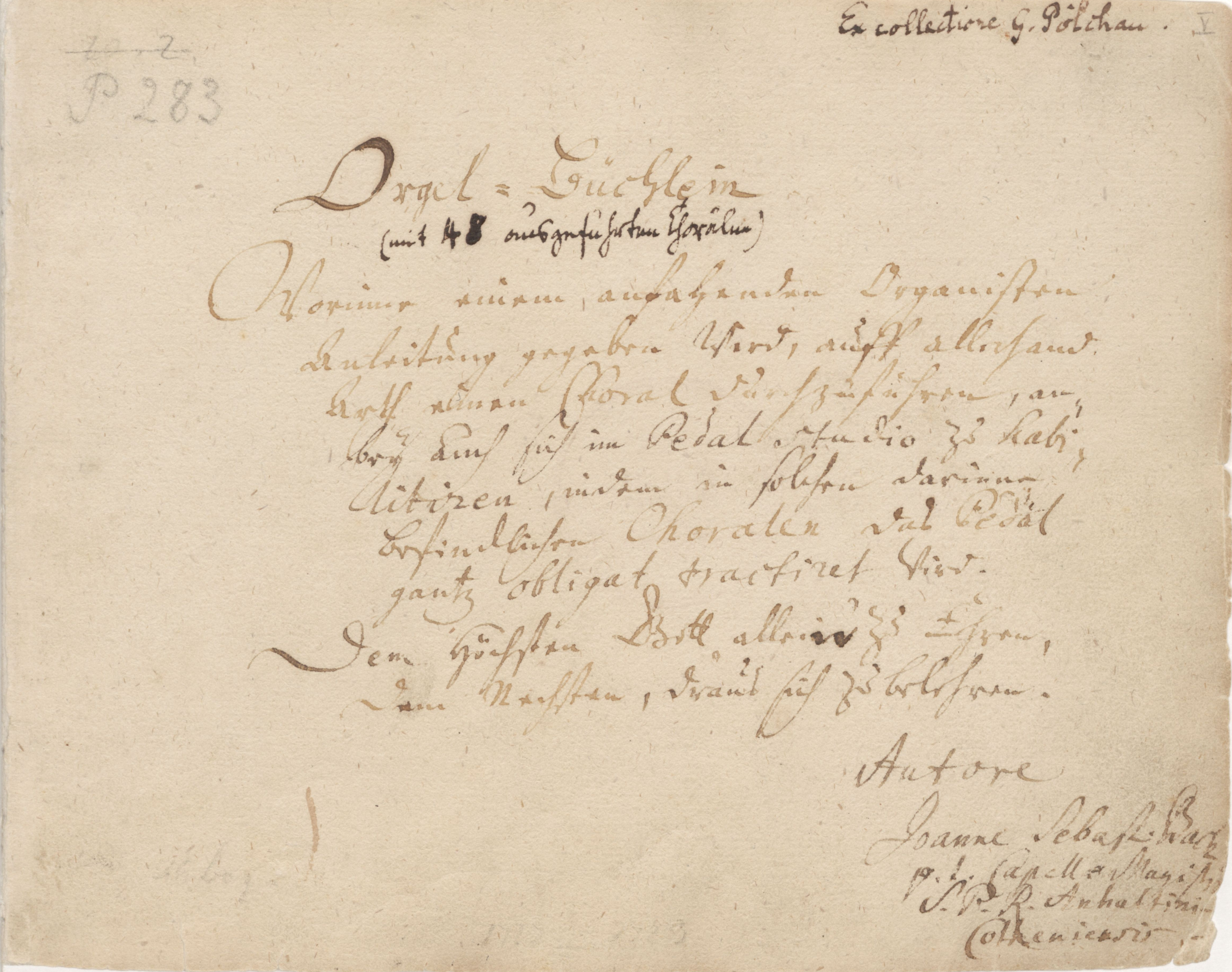
Title page of the Orgelbüchlein

Orgel-Büchlein
Worrine einem anfahenden Organisten
Anleitung gegeben wird, auff allerhand
Arth einen Choral durchzuführen, an-
bey auch sich im Pedal studio zu habi-
litiren, indem in solchen darinne
befindlichen Choralen das Pedal
gantz obligat tractiret wird.
Dem Höchsten Gott allein' zu Ehren,
Dem Nechsten, draus sich zu belehren.
Autore
Joanne Sebast. Bach
p. t. Capellae Magistri
S. P. R. Anhaltini-
Cotheniensis.

Little Organ Book
In which a beginning organist
receives given instruction as to performing
a chorale in a multitude of ways while
achieving mastery in the study of the pedal,
since in the chorales contained herein
the pedal is treated entirely obbligato.

In honour of our Lord alone
That my fellow man his skill may hone.
Composed by
Johann Sebastian Bach
Capellmeister
to his Serene Highness the Prince of Anhalt-
Cöthen

Planned content of the Orgelbüchlein as indicated in the autograph manuscript
Number	Title	Liturgical significance	Page	BWV
1	Nun komm, der Heiden Heiland	Advent	1	599
2	Gott, durch dein Güte or Gottes Sohn ist kommen	Advent	2-3	600
3	Herr Christ, der ein'ge Gottessohn or Herr Gott, nun sei gepreiset	Advent	4	601
4	Lob sei dem allmächtigen Gott	Advent	5	602
5	Puer natus in Bethlehem	Christmas	6-7	603
6	Lob sei Gott in des Himmels Thron	Christmas	7	
7	Gelobet seist du, Jesu Christ	Christmas	8	604
8	Der Tag, der ist so freudenreich	Christmas	9	605
9	Von Himmel hoch, da komm ich her	Christmas	10	606
10	Von Himmel kam der Engel Schar	Christmas	11-10	607
11	In dulci jubilo	Christmas	12-13	608
12	Lobt Gott, ihr Christen, allzugleich	Christmas	14	609
13	Jesu, meine Freude	Christmas	15	610
14	Christum wir sollen loben schon	Christmas	16	611
15	Wir Christenleut	Christmas	17	612
16	Helft mir Gotts Güte preisen	New Year	18	613
17	Das alte Jahr vergangen ist	New Year	19	614
18	In dir ist Freude	New Year	20-21	615
19	Mit Fried und Freud ich fahr dahin [Nunc dimittis]	Purification	22	616
20	Herr Gott, nun schleuss den Himmel auf	Purification	23-23a	617
21	O Lamm Gottes, unschuldig	Passiontide	24-24a	618
22	Christe, du Lamm Gottes	Passiontide	25	619
23	Christus, der uns selig macht	Passiontide	26	620a/620
24	Da Jesu an dem Kreuze stund	Passiontide	27	621
25	O Mensch, bewein dein Sünde gross	Passiontide	28-29	622
26	Wir danken dir, Herr Jesu Christ, dass du für uns gestorben bist	Passiontide	30	623
27	Hilf Gott, das mir's gelinge	Passiontide	31-30a	624
28	O Jesu, wie ist dein Gestalt	Passiontide	32	
29	O Traurigkeit, o Herzeleid (fragment)	Passiontide	33	Anh. 200
30	Allein nach dir, Herr, allein nach dir, Herr Jesu Christ, verlanget mich	Passiontide	34-35	
31	O wir armen Sünder	Passiontide	36	
32	Herzliebster Jesu, was hast du verbrochen	Passiontide	37	
33	Nun gibt mein Jesus gute Nacht	Passiontide	38	
34	Christ lag in Todesbanden	Easter	39	625
35	Jesus Christus, unser Heiland, der den Tod überwand	Easter	40	626
36	Christ ist erstanden	Easter	41-43	627
37	Erstanden ist der heil'ge Christ	Easter	44	628
38	Erscheinen ist der herrliche Tag	Easter	45	629
39	Heut triumphieret Gottes Sohn	Easter	46-47	630
40	Gen Himmel aufgefahren ist	Ascension	48	
41	Nun freut euch, Gottes Kinder, all	Ascension	49	
42	Komm, Heiliger Geist, erfüll die Herzen deiner Gläubigen	Pentecost	50-51	
43	Komm, Heiliger Geist, Herre Gott	Pentecost	52-53	
44	Komm, Gott Schöpfer, Heiliger Geist	Pentecost	54	631a/631
45	Nun bitten wir den Heil'gen Geist	Pentecost	55	
46	Spiritus Sancti gratia or Des Heil'gen Geistes reiche Gnad	Pentecost	56	
47	O Heil'ger Geist, du göttlich's Feuer	Pentecost	57	
48	O Heiliger Geist, o heiliger Gott	Pentecost	58	
49	Herr Jesu Christ, dich zu uns wend	Pentecost	59	632
50	Liebster Jesu, wir sind hier	Pentecost	60	634
51	Liebster Jesu, wir sind hier (distinctius)	Pentecost	61	633
52	Gott der Vater wohn uns bei	Trinity	62-63	
53	Allein Gott in der Höh sei Ehr	Trinity	64	
54	Der du bist drei in Einigkeit	Trinity	65	
55	Gelobet sei der Herr, der Gott Israel [Benedictus]	St. John the Baptist	66	
56	Meine Seele erhebt den Herren [Magnificat]	Visitation	67	
57	Herr Gott, dich loben alle wir	St. Michael and All Angels	68	
58	Er stehn vor Gottes Throne	St. Michael and All Angels	69	
59	Herr Gott, dich loben wir	St. Simon and St. Jude, Apostles	70-71	
60	O Herre Gott, dein göttlich Wort	Reformation Festival	72	
61	Dies sind die heil'gen zehn Gebot	Ten Commandments	73	635
62	Mensch, willst du leben seliglich	Ten Commandments	74	
63	Herr Gott, erhalt uns für und für	Ten Commandments	75	
64	Wir glauben all an einem Gott	Creed	76-77	
65	Vater unser im Himmelreich	Lord's Prayer	78	636
66	Christ, unser Herr, zu Jordan kam	Holy Baptism	79	
67	Auf tiefer Not schrei ich zu dir [Psalm 130]	Confession, Penitence and Justification	80	
68	Erbarm dich mein, o Herre Gott	Confession, Penitence and Justification	81	
69	Jesu, der du meine Seele	Confession, Penitence and Justification	82	
70	Allein zu dir, Herr Jesu Christ	Confession, Penitence and Justification	83	
71	Ach Gott und Herr	Confession, Penitence and Justification	84	
72	Herr Jesu Christ, du höchstes Gut	Confession, Penitence and Justification	85	
73	Ach Herr, mich armen Sünder	Confession, Penitence and Justification	86	
74	Wo soll ich fliehen hin	Confession, Penitence and Justification	87	
75	Wir haben schwerlich	Confession, Penitence and Justification	88	
76	Durch Adams Fall ist ganz verderbt	Confession, Penitence and Justification	89	637
77	Es ist das Heil uns kommen her	Confession, Penitence and Justification	90	638
78	Jesus Christus, unser Heiland	Lord's Supper	91	
79	Gott sei gelobet und gebenedeiet	Lord's Supper	92-93	
80	Der Herr is mein getreuer Hirt [Psalm 23]	Lord's Supper	94	
81	Jetzt komm ich als ein armer Gast	Lord's Supper	95	
82	O Jesu, du edle Gabe	Lord's Supper	96	
83	Wir danken dir, Herr Jesu Christ, dass du das Lämmlein worden bist	Lord's Supper	97	
84	Ich weiss ein Blümlein hübsch und fein	Lord's Supper	98	
85	Nun freut euch, lieben Christen g'mein	Lord's Supper	99	
86	Nun lob, mein Seel, den Herren [Psalm 103]	Lord's Supper	100-101	
87	Wohl dem, der in Gottes Furcht steht	Christian Life and Conduct	102	
88	Wo Gott zum Haus nicht gibt sein Gunst [Psalm 127]	Christian Life and Conduct	103	
89	Was mein Gott will, das g'scheh allzeit	Christian Life and Conduct	104	
90	Kommt her zu mir, spricht Gottes Sohn	Christian Life and Conduct	105	
91	Ich ruf zu dir, Herr Jesu Christ	Christian Life and Conduct	106-107	639
92	Weltlich Ehr und zeitlich Gut	Christian Life and Conduct	107	
93	Von Gott will ich nicht lassen	Christian Life and Conduct	108	
94	Wer Gott vertraut	Christian Life and Conduct	109	
95	Wie's Gott gefällt, so gefällt mir's auch	Christian Life and Conduct	110	
96	O Gott, du frommer Gott	Christian Life and Conduct	111	
97	In dich hab ich gehoffet, Herr [Psalm 31]	Christian Life and Conduct	112	
98	In dich hab ich gehoffet, Herr (alia modo)	Christian Life and Conduct	113	640
99	Mag ich Unglück nicht widertstahn	Christian Life and Conduct	114	
100	Wenn wir in höchsten Nöten sein	Christian Life and Conduct	115	641
101	An Wasserflüssen Babylon [Psalm 137]	Christian Life and Conduct	116-117	
102	Warum betrübst du dich, mein Herz	Christian Life and Conduct	118	
103	Frisch auf, mein Seel, verzage nicht	Christian Life and Conduct	119	
104	Ach Gott, wie manches Herzeleid	Christian Life and Conduct	120	
105	Ach Gott, erhör mein Seufzen und Wehklagen	Christian Life and Conduct	121	
106	So wünsch ich nun eine gute Nacht [Psalm 42]	Christian Life and Conduct	122	
107	Ach lieben Christen, seid getrost	Christian Life and Conduct	123	
108	Wenn dich Unglück tut greifen an	Christian Life and Conduct	124	
109	Keinen hat Gott verlassen	Christian Life and Conduct	125	
110	Gott ist mein Heil, mein Hülf und Trost	Christian Life and Conduct	126	
111	Was Gott tut, das ist wohlgetan, kein einig Mensch ihn tadeln kann	Christian Life and Conduct	127	
112	Was Gott tut, das ist wohlgetan, es bleibt gerecht sein Wille	Christian Life and Conduct	128	
113	Wer nur den lieben Gott lässt walten	Christian Life and Conduct	129	642
114	Ach Gott, vom Himmel sieh darein [Psalm 12]	Psalm Hymns	130	
115	Es spricht der Unweisen Mund wohl [Psalm 14]	Psalm Hymns	131	
116	Ein feste Burg ist unser Gott [Psalm 46]	Psalm Hymns	132	
117	Es woll uns Gott genädig sein [Psalm 67]	Psalm Hymns	133	
118	Wär Gott nicht mit uns diese Zeit [Psalm 124]	Psalm Hymns	134	
119	Wo Gott der Herr nicht bei uns hält [Psalm 124]	Psalm Hymns	135	
120	Wie schön leuchtet der Morgernstern	Word of God and Christian Church	136-137	
121	Wie nach einer Wasserquelle [Psalm 42]	Word of God and Christian Church	138	
122	Erhalt uns, Herr, bei deinem Wort	Word of God and Christian Church	139	
123	Lass mich dein sein und bleiben	Word of God and Christian Church	140	
124	Gib Fried, o frommer, treuer Gott	Word of God and Christian Church	141	
125	Du Friedefürst, Herr Jesu Christ	Word of God and Christian Church	142	
126	O grosser Gott von Macht	Word of God and Christian Church	143	
127	Wenn mein Stündlein vorhanden ist	Death and Dying	144	
128	Herr Jesu Christ, wahr Mensch und Gott	Death and Dying	145	
129	Mitten wir im Leben sind	Death and Dying	146-147	
130	Alle Menschen müssen sterben	Death and Dying	148	
131	Alle Menschen müssen sterben (alio modo)	Death and Dying	149	643
132	Valet will ich dir geben	Death and Dying	150	
133	Nun lasst uns den Leib begraben	Death and Dying	151	
134	Christus, der ist mein Leben	Death and Dying	152	
135	Herzlich lieb hab ich dich, o Herr	Death and Dying	152-153	
136	Auf meinen lieben Gott	Death and Dying	154	
137	Herr Jesu Christ, ich weiss gar wohl	Death and Dying	155	
138	Mach's mit mir, Gott, nach deiner Güt	Death and Dying	156	
139	Herr Jesu Christ, meins Lebens Licht	Death and Dying	157	
140	Mein Wallfahrt ich vollendet hab	Death and Dying	158	
141	Gott hat das Evangelium	Death and Dying	159	
142	Ach Gott, tu dich erbarmen	Death and Dying	160	
143	Gott des Himmels und der Erden	Morning	161	
144	Ich dank dir, lieber Herre	Morning	162	
145	Aus Meines Herzens Grunde	Morning	163	
146	Ich dank dir schon	Morning	164	
147	Das walt mein Gott	Morning	165	
148	Christ, der du bist der helle Tag	Evening	166	
149	Christe, der du bist Tag und Licht	Evening	167	
150	Werde munter, mein Gemüte	Evening	168	
151	Nun ruhen alle Wälder	Evening	169	
152	Dankt dem Herrn, denn er ist sehr freundlich [Psalm 136]	After Meals	170	
153	Nun lasst uns Gott dem Herren	After Meals	171	
154	Lobet dem Herren, denn er ist sehr freundlich [Psalm 147]	After Meals	172	
155	Singen wir aus Herzensgrund	After Meals	173	
156	Gott Vater, der du deine Sonn	Good Weather	174	
157	Jesue, meines Herzens Freud	Appendix	175	
158	Ach, was soll ich Sűnder machen	Appendix	176	
159	Ach wie nichtig, ach wie flüchtig	Appendix	177	644
160	Ach, was ist doch unser Leben	Appendix	178	
161	Allenthalben, wo ich gehe	Appendix	179	
162	Hast du denn, Jesu, dein Angesicht gänzlich verborgen or Soll ich denn, Jesu, mein Leben in Trauern beschliessen	Appendix	180	
163	Sei gegrüsset, Jesu gütig or O Jesu, du edle Gabe	Appendix	181	
164	Schmücke dich, o liebe Seele	Appendix	182	

== History ==
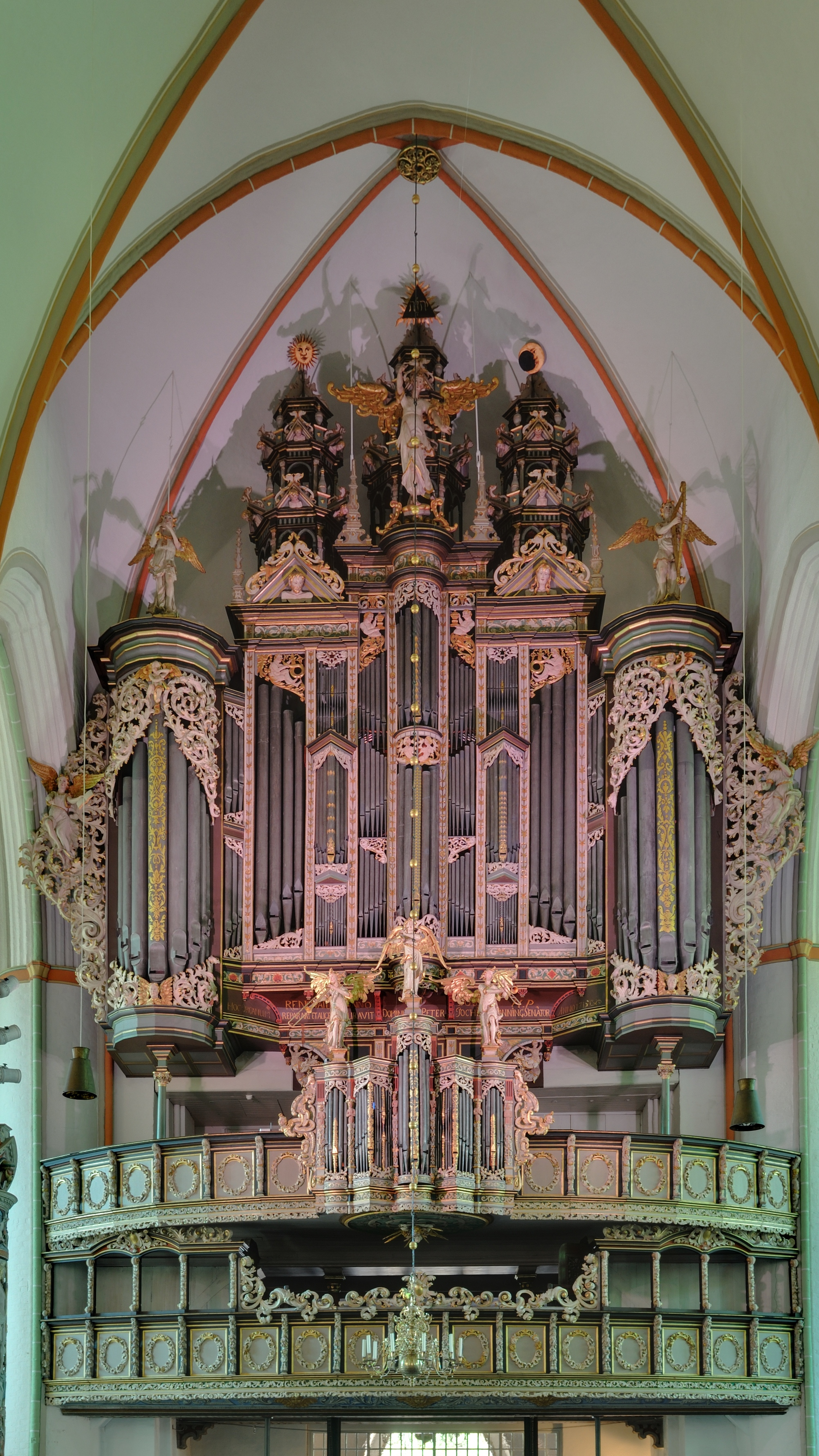
Baroque organ in the Johanniskirche in Lüneburg, where Bach's teacher Georg Böhm was organist

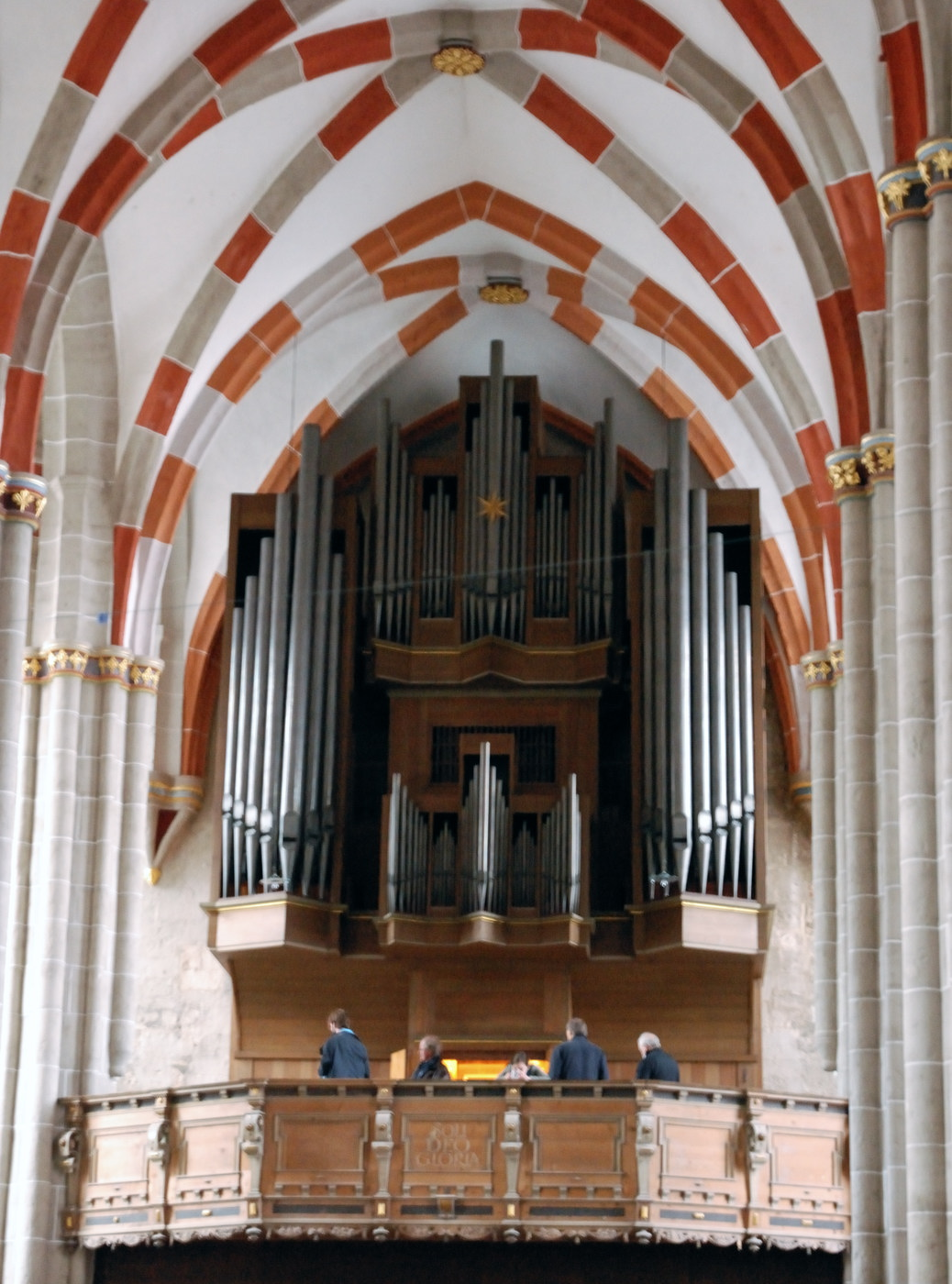
Organ in St Blasius Church in Mühlhausen, reconstructed in 1959 to Bach's 1708–09 specifications, with a third keyboard and 26 bell glockenspiel.

Bach's formal training as a musician started when he was enrolled as a chorister at the Michaelskirche in Lüneburg in 1700–1702. Manuscripts in Bach's hand recently discovered in Weimar by the Bach scholars Peter Wollny and Michael Maul show that while in Lüneburg he studied the organ with Georg Böhm, composer and organist at the Johanniskirche. The documents are hand copies made in Böhm's home in tablature format of organ compositions by Reincken, Buxtehude and others. They indicate that already at the age of 15 Bach was an accomplished organist, playing some of the most demanding repertoire of the period. After a brief spell in Weimar as court musician in the chapel of Johann Ernst, Duke of Saxe-Weimar, Bach was appointed as organist at St. Boniface's Church (now called the Bachkirche) in Arnstadt in the summer of 1703, having inspected and reported on the organ there earlier in the year. In 1705–1706 he was granted leave from Arnstadt to study with the organist and composer Dieterich Buxtehude in Lübeck, a pilgrimage he famously made on foot. In 1707 Bach became organist at St. Blasius' Church in Mühlhausen, before his second appointment at the court in Weimar in 1708 as concertmaster and organist, where he remained until 1717.

During the period before his return to Weimar, Bach had composed a set of 31 chorale preludes: these were discovered independently by Christoph Wolff and Wilhelm Krunbach in the library of Yale University in the mid-1980s and first published as Das Arnstadter Orgelbuch. They form part of a larger collection of organ music compiled in the 1790s by the organist Johann Gottfried Neumeister (1756–1840) and are now referred to as the Neumeister Chorales BWV 1090–1120. These chorale preludes are all short, either in variation form or fughettas. Only a few other organ works based on chorales can be dated with any certainty to this period. These include the chorale partitas BWV 766-768 and 770, all sets of variations on a given chorale.

During his time as organist at Arnstadt, Bach was upbraided in 1706 by the Arnstadt Consistory "for having hitherto introduced sundry curious embellishments in the chorales and mingled many strange notes in them, with the result that the congregation has been confused." The type of chorale prelude to which this refers, often called the "Arnstadt type", were used to accompany the congregation with modulating improvisatory sections between the verses: examples that are presumed to be of this form include BWV 715, 722, 726, 729, 732 and 738. The earliest surviving autograph manuscript of a chorale prelude is BWV 739, Wie schön leuchtet der Morgenstern, based on an Epiphany hymn. It dates from 1705 and possibly was prepared for Bach's visit to Lübeck.

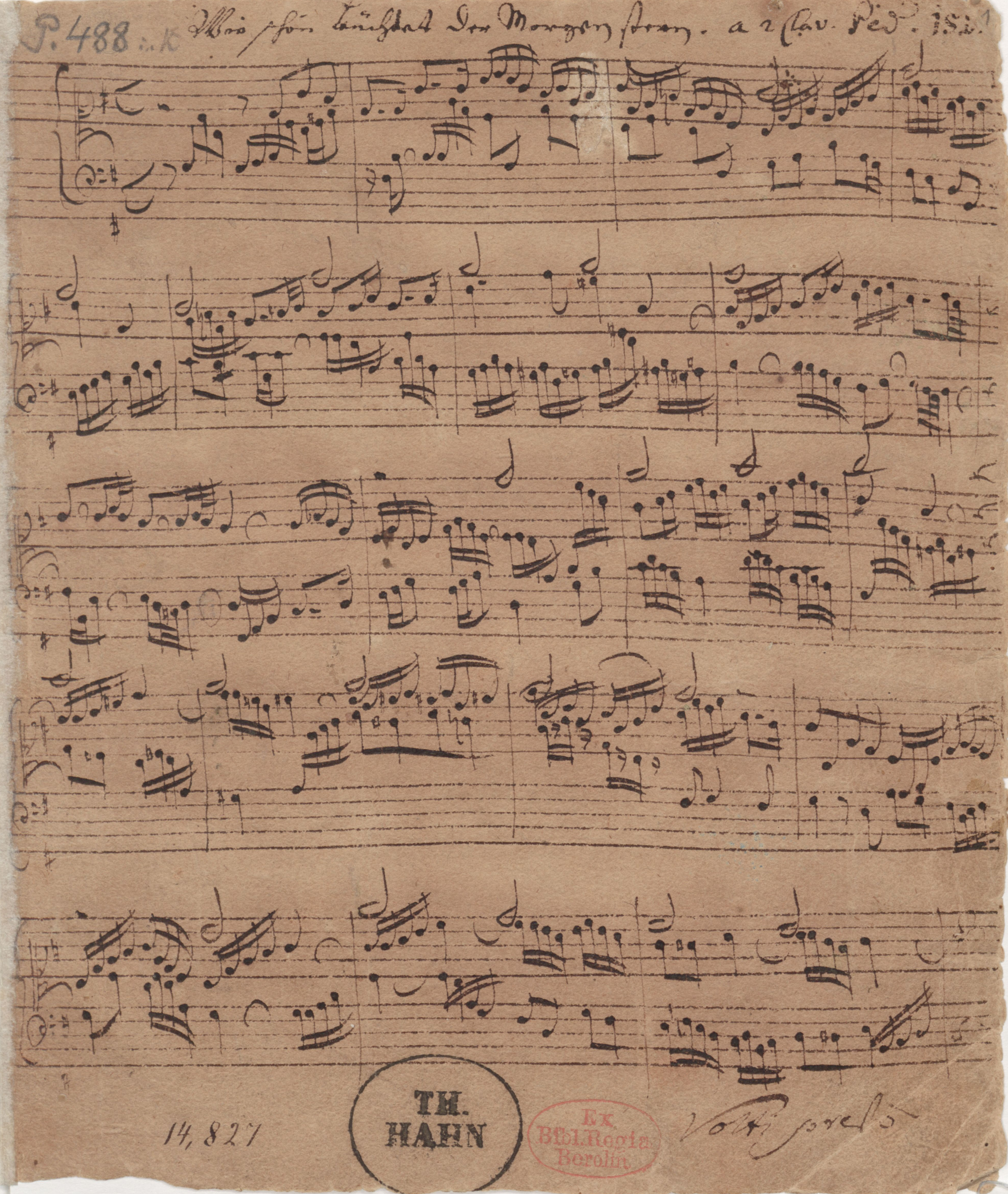
Autograph manuscript of BWV 739

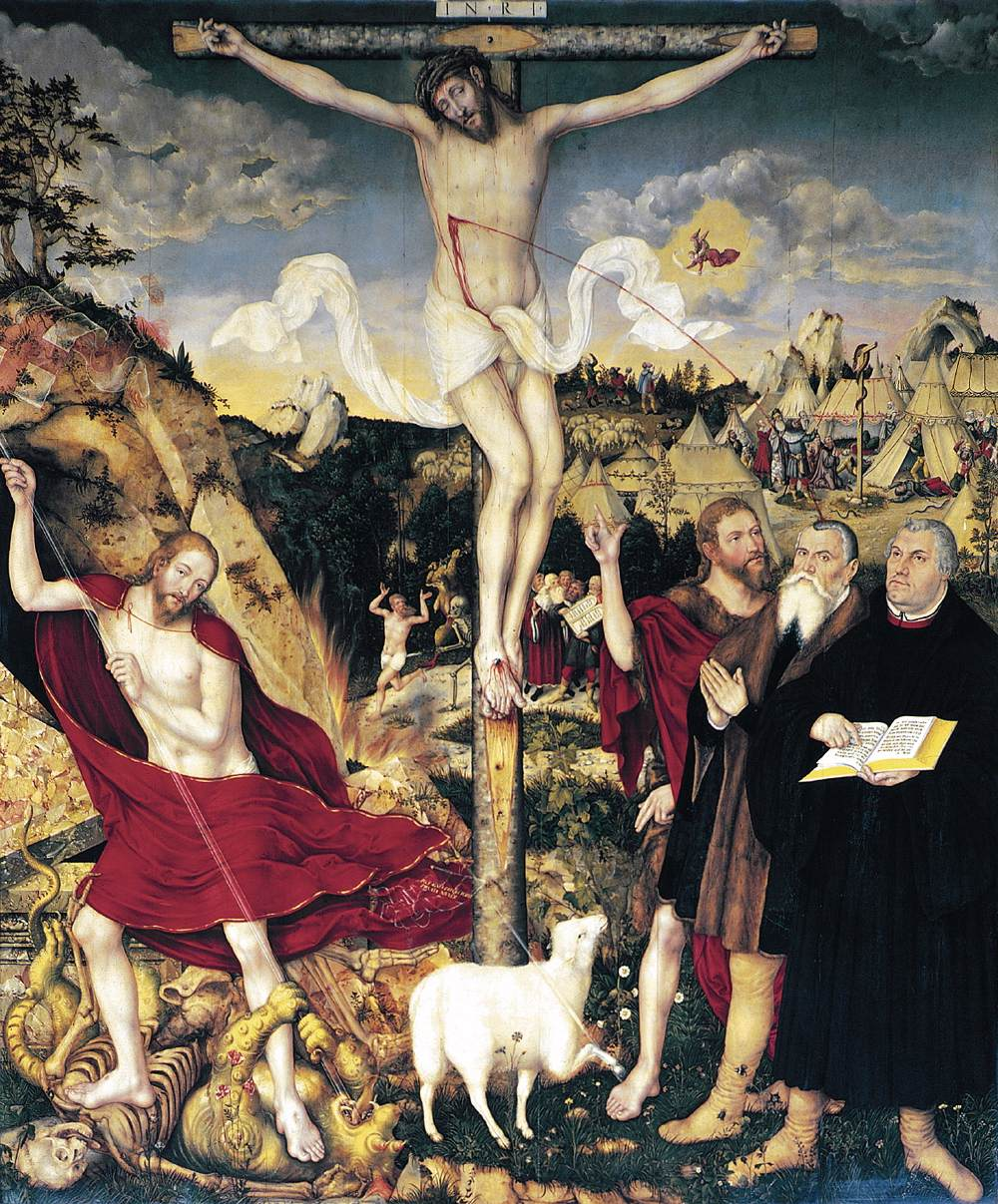
Cranach altarpiece in St Peter und Paul, where Bach played the organ

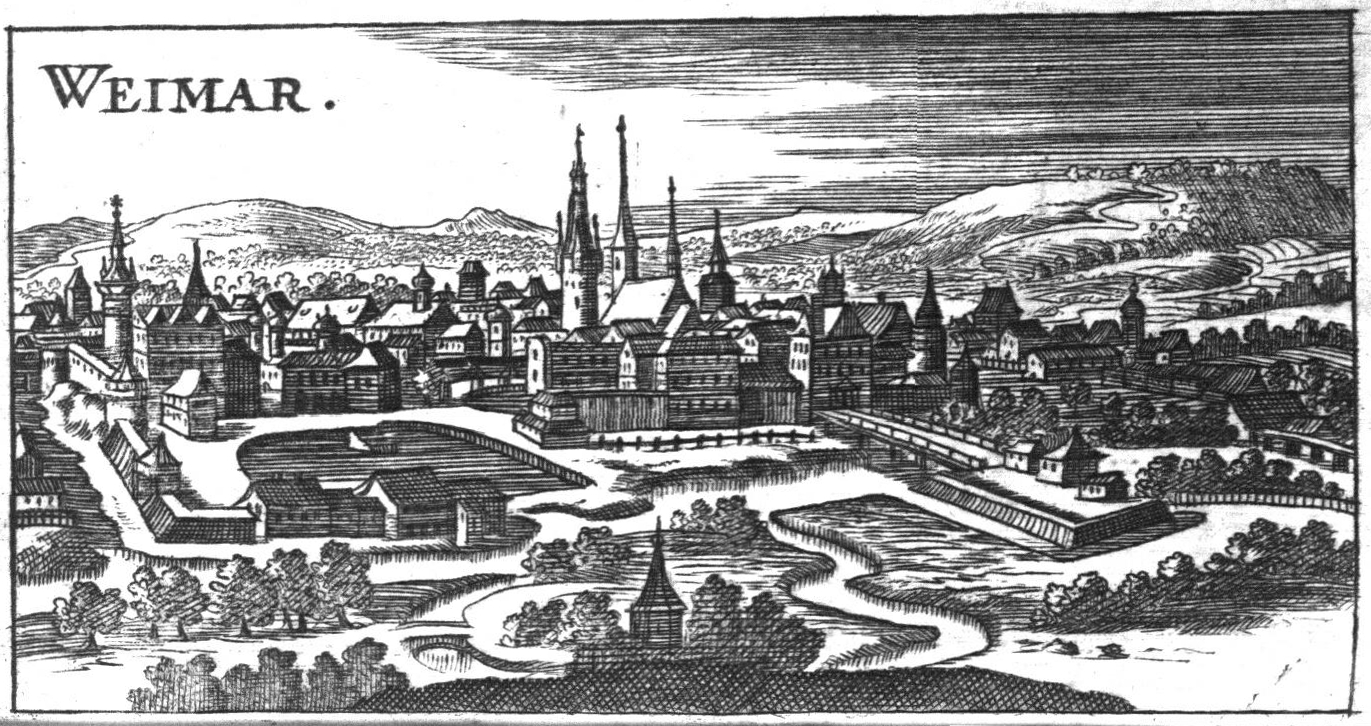
View of Weimar, 1686: Wilhelmsburg in centre, St Peter and Paul behind, Rote Schloss over footbridge on left

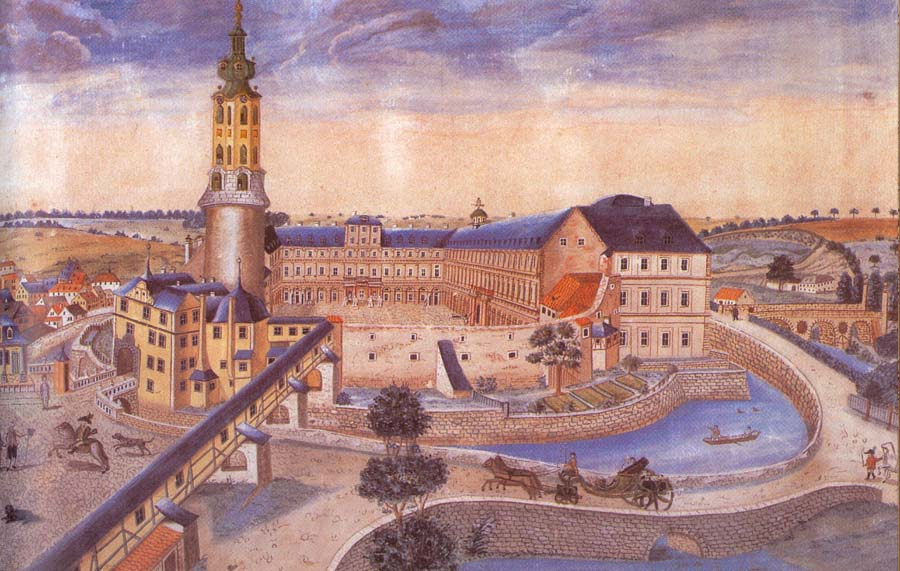
Wilhelmsburg, Weimar, c 1730, built in the 1650s and destroyed by fire in 1774

== Purpose ==
The Orgelbüchlein is simultaneously a compositional treatise, a collection of liturgical organ music, an organ method, and a theological statement. These four identities are so closely intertwined that it is hard to know where one leaves off and another begins.

— Stinson (1999, p. 25)

== Compositional style ==
Although there are a few important departures, the chorale preludes of the Orgelbüchlein were composed with a number of common stylistic features, which characterise and distinguish the so-called "Orgelbüchlein style:"

- They are harmonisations of a cantus firmus which is taken by the soprano voice.
- They are in four parts, with three accompanying voices.
- The harmonies are filled out in the accompanying voices by motifs or figures derived from the cantus and written imitatively.
- They begin directly with the cantus, either with or without accompaniment.
- There are no breaks between the lines of the cantus for ritornellos or interludes in the accompanying voices.
- The notes ending verse lines in the cantus are marked by fermata (pauses).

Exceptions include:

- BWV 611, Christum wir sollen loben schon, where the cantus is in the alto voice
- BWV 600, 608, 618, 619, 620, 624, 629 and 633/634 where the soprano cantus is in canon with another voice.
- BWV 615, In dir ist Freude, where the cantus is heard in canon in all the voices over the accompanying motifs.
- BWV 599, Nun komm, der Heiden Heiland, and BWV 619, Christe du Lamm Gottes, which are written for five voices.
- BWV 639, Ich ruf' zu dir, Herr Jesu Christ, which is written for three voices.
- BWV 617, 618, 619 and 637, where the accompaniment starts before the cantus.

== Chorale Preludes BWV 599–644 ==
The brief descriptions of the chorale preludes are based on the detailed analysis in Williams (2003) and Stinson (1999). The metrical English translations of the texts of the Lutheran chorales are mostly taken from Terry (1921); more literal translations can be found in Williams (2003) and have been provided in the text below when appropriate.

=== Advent BWV 599–602 ===
- BWV 599 Nun komm, der Heiden Heiland [Come now Saviour of heathens]

MIDI rendition

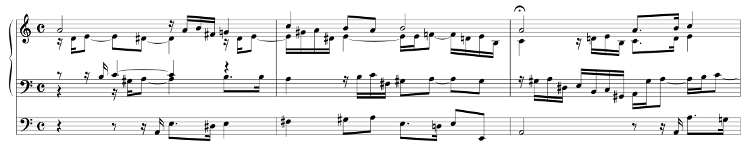

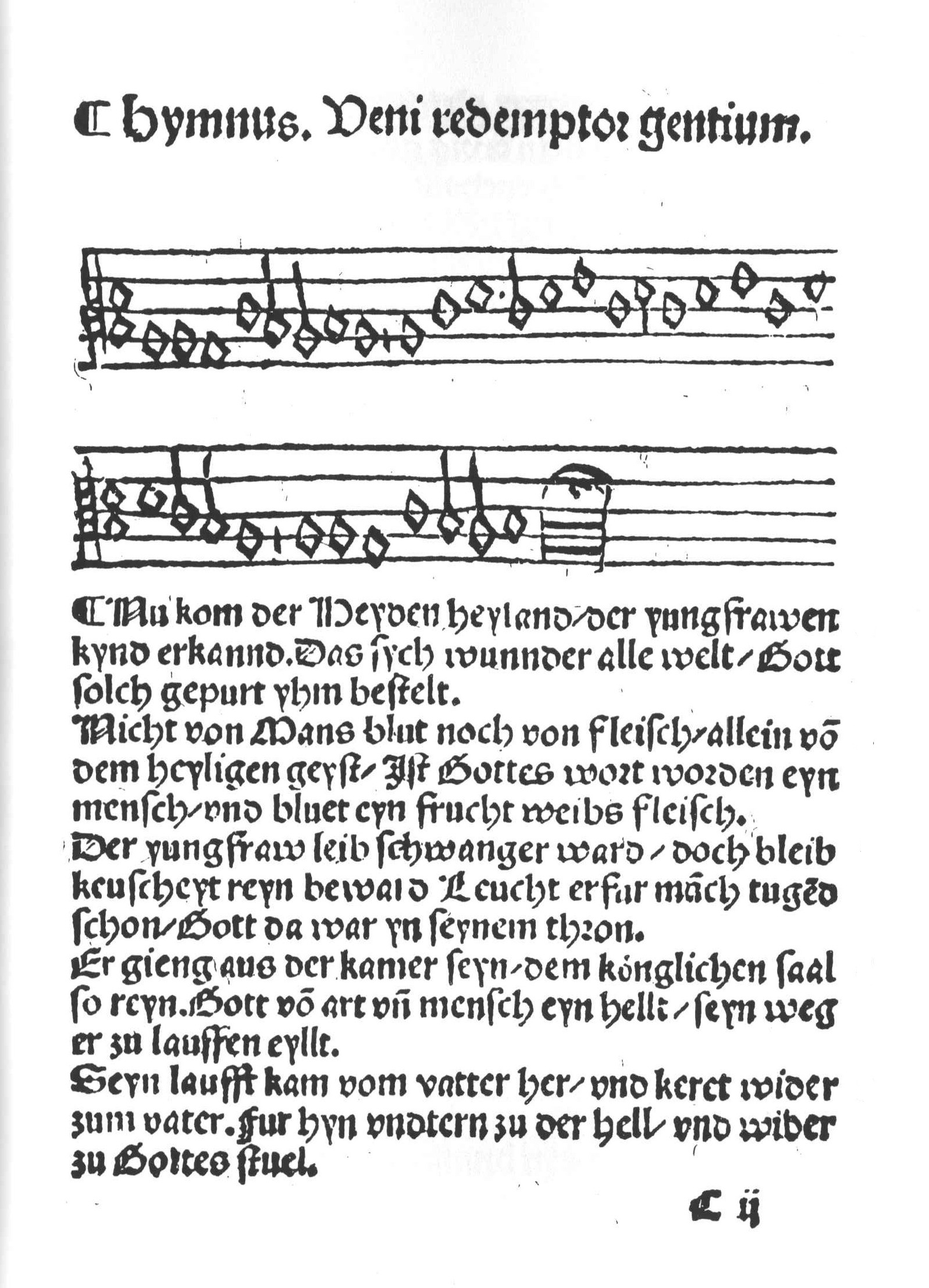
The melody and words of "Nun komm, der Heiden Heiland" from the Erfurt Enchiridion, 1524

Below is the first verse of Luther's advent hymn "Nun komm, der Heiden Heiland" with the translation in English of George MacDonald.

Nun komm, der Heiden Heiland,
der Jungfrauen Kind erkannt!
dass sich wundert alle Welt,
Gott solch' Geburt ihm bestellt.

Translation:

Come, Saviour of nations wild,
Of the maiden owned the Child,
Fill with wonder all the earth,
God should grant it such a birth.

Although it has often been suggested that this opening advent chorale prelude resembles a French overture, in construction, with its texture of arpeggiated chords, it is more similar to the baroque keyboard preludes of German and French masters, such as Couperin. The accompanying motif in the lower three or sometimes four parts is derived from a suspirans in the melodic line, formed of a semiquaver (16th note) rest—a "breath"—followed by three semiquavers and a longer fourth note. Some commentators have seen this falling figure as representing a descent to earth, but it could equally well reflect a repetition of the words "Nun komm" in the text. The suspirans is made up of intervals of a rising second, a falling fourth following by yet another rising second. It is derived from the first line of the melody of the cantus firmus and often shared out freely between voices in the accompaniment. The mystery of the coming of the Saviour is reflected by the somewhat hidden cantus firmus, over harmonies constantly reinventing themselves. It is less predictable and regular than other settings of the same hymn by Bach or predecessors like Buxtehude, only the second and third lines having any regularity. The last line repeats the first but with the suspirans suppressed and the dotted rhythms of the bass replaced by a long pedal note, possibly reflecting the wonder described in the third and fourth lines of the first verse.

- BWV 600 Gott, durch deine Güte [God, through your goodness] (or Gottes Sohn ist kommen [The Son of God is come])

MIDI rendition

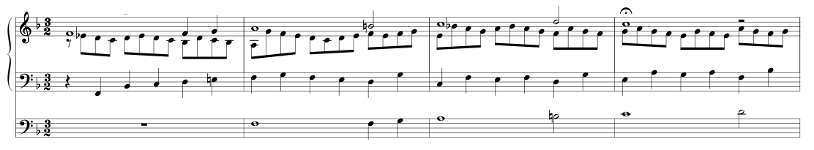

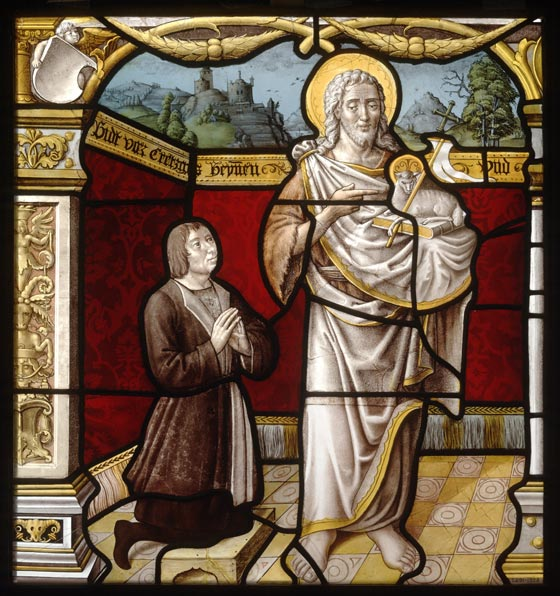
St John the Baptist with the Lamb of God, early 16th-century stained glass from Mariawald Abbey near Cologne

Below is the first of three verses of Johann Spannenberg's advent hymn with the translation in English of Charles Sanford Terry.

Gott, durch deine Güte,
wolst uns arme Leute
Herze, Sinn und Gemüte
für des Teufels Wüten
am Leben und im Todt
gnädiglich behüten.

Translation:

God of grace and mercy,
Glance in pity on me;
Heart and mind and spirit,
Keep them through Thy merit.
Satan every hour
Waiteth to devour.

It is set to the same melody as Johann Roh's advent hymn Gottes Sohn ist kommen, the first verse of which is given here with the English translation of Catherine Winkworth.

Gottes Sohn ist kommen
uns allen zu Frommen
hier auf diese Erden
in armen Gebärden,
daß er uns von Sünde
freiet' und entbünde.

Translation:

Once He came in blessing,
All our ills redressing;
Came in likeness lowly,
Son of God most holy;
Bore the cross to save us,
Hope and freedom gave us.

This chorale prelude is a canon at the octave in the soprano and tenor voices, with the tenor entering one bar after the soprano. The stops for the canonic parts were explicitly marked by Bach in the autograph score, with the high tenor part in the pedal, written at the pitch Bach intended and also within the compass of the Weimar organ. Bach left no indication that the manualiter parts were to be played on two keyboards: indeed, as Stinson (1999) points out, the autograph score brackets all the keyboard parts together; in addition technically at certain points the keyboard parts have to be shared between the two hands. The accompaniment is a skillful and harmonious moto perpetuo in the alto and bass keyboard parts with flowing quavers (eighth notes) in the alto, derived from the first four quaver suspirans figure, played above a walking bass in detached crotchets (quarter notes). The hymn was originally written in duple time but, to facilitate the canonic counterpoint, Bach adopted triple time with a minim beat, at half the speed of the bass. The bass accompaniment at first is derived directly from the melody; during the pauses in the soprano part, a second motif recurs. The continuous accompaniment in quavers and crotchets is an example of the first of two types of joy motif described by Schweitzer (1911b), used to convey "direct and naive joy". In the words of Albert Riemenschneider, "the exuberance of the passage work indicates a joyous background."

- BWV 601 Herr Christ, der einge Gottes-Sohn [Lord Christ, the only Son of God] (or Herr Gott, nun sei gepreiset [Lord God, now be praised])

MIDI rendition

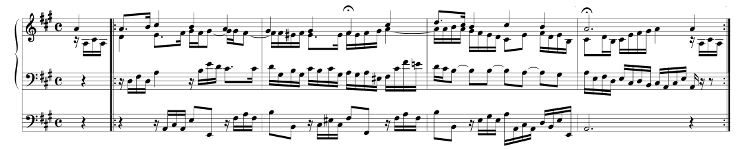

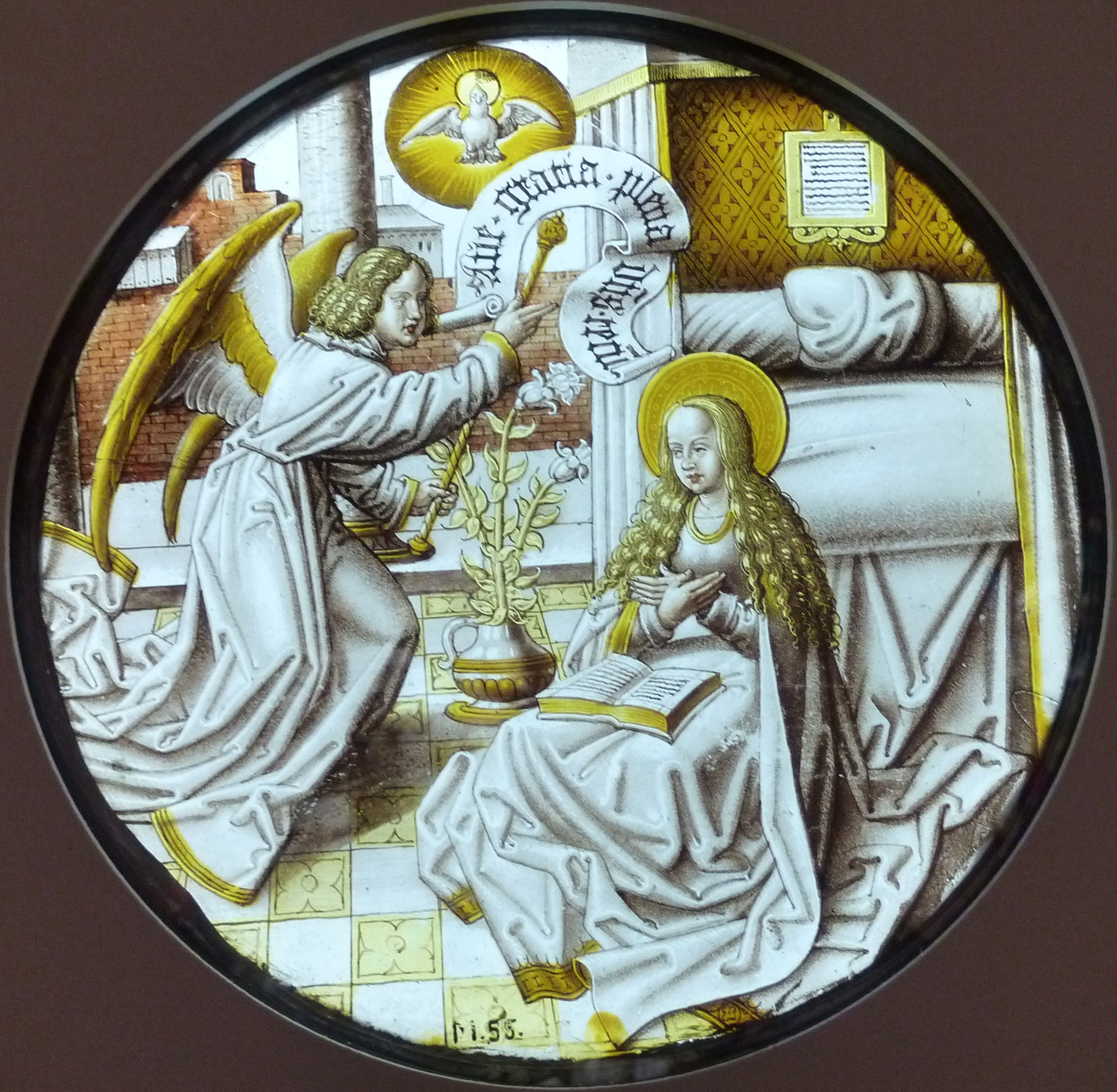
The Annunciation, early 16th-century German stained glass roundel

Below are the first and last verses of Elisabeth Cruciger's hymn for Epiphany Herr Christ, der einig Gotts Sohn with the English translation of Myles Coverdale.

Herr Christ, der ein'ge Gottes-Sohn
Vaters in Ewigkeit,
aus sein'm Herzen entsprossen,
gleichwie geschrieben steht,
er is der Morgensterne,
sein Glänzen streckt er ferne
vor andern Sternen klar.
∘∘∘
Ertöt uns durch dein Güte,
erweck uns durch dein Gnad;
den alten Menschen kränke,
daß der neu' leben mag
wohl hie auf dieser Erden,
den Sinn und all Begehren
und G'danken hab'n zu dir.

Translation:

Christ is the only Sonne of God,
The Father Eternall:
We have in Jesse founde this rod,
God and Man natural!
He is the mornynge star;
His beames sendeth He out farre
Beyonde other starres all.
∘∘∘
Awake us, Lorde, we praye The;
Thy Holy Spirite us gave,
Which maye oure olde man mortifie,
That oure new man maye lyve.
So wyll we alwaye thanke The,
That shewest us so great mercye,
And oure synnes dost forgeve.

The same melody was used in the postprandial grace Herr Gott, nun sei gepreiset, the first verse of which is given below with the English translation of Charles Sanford Terry.

Herr Gott, nun sei gepreiset,
wir sagen frohen Dank,
daß du uns Gnad' erwiesen,
gegeben Speis' und Trank,
dein mildes Herz zu merken,
den Glauben uns zu stärken,
daß du seist unser Gott.

Translation:

O God in heaven we praise Thee
And yield Thee gratitude
For all Thy generous bounty,
For all our daily food,
For all the love showered on us.
For all the grace poured on us,
By Thee, our loving Lord.

According to the chronology of Stinson (1999), this chorale prelude was probably the first to be entered by Bach in the autograph manuscript. Already it shows with beguiling simplicity all the features typical of the Orgelbüchlein preludes. The cantus firmus is presented unadorned in the soprano line with the other three voices on the same keyboard and in the pedal. The accompaniment is derived from the suspirans pedal motif of three semiquavers (16th notes) followed by two quavers (eighth notes). For Schweitzer (1911b) this particular motif signified "beatific joy", representing either "intimate gladness or blissful adoration". Although the chorale prelude cannot be precisely matched to the words of either hymn, the mood expressed is in keeping both with joy for the coming of Christ and gratitude for the bountifulness of God. The motif, which is anticipated and echoed in the seamlessly interwoven inner parts, was already common in chorale preludes of the period. Easy to play with alternating feet, it figured in particular in the preludes of Buxtehude and Böhm as well as an earlier manualiter setting of the same hymn by Bach's cousin, Johann Gottfried Walther. Bach, however, goes beyond the previous models, creating a unique texture in the accompaniment which accelerates, particularly in the pedal, towards the cadences. Already in the opening bar, as Williams (2003) points out, the subtlety of Bach's compositional skills are apparent. The alto part anticipates the pedal motif and, with it and the later dotted figure, echos the melody in the soprano. This type of writing—in this case with hidden and understated imitation between the voices, almost in canon, conveying a mood of intimacy—was a new feature introduced by Bach in his Orgelbüchlein.

- BWV 602 Lob sei dem allmächtigen Gott [Praise be to God Almighty]

MIDI rendition

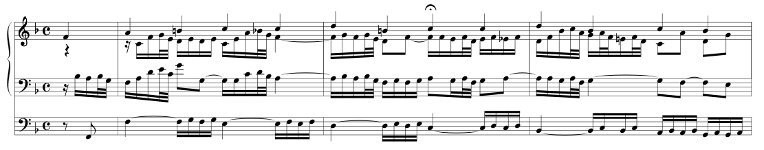

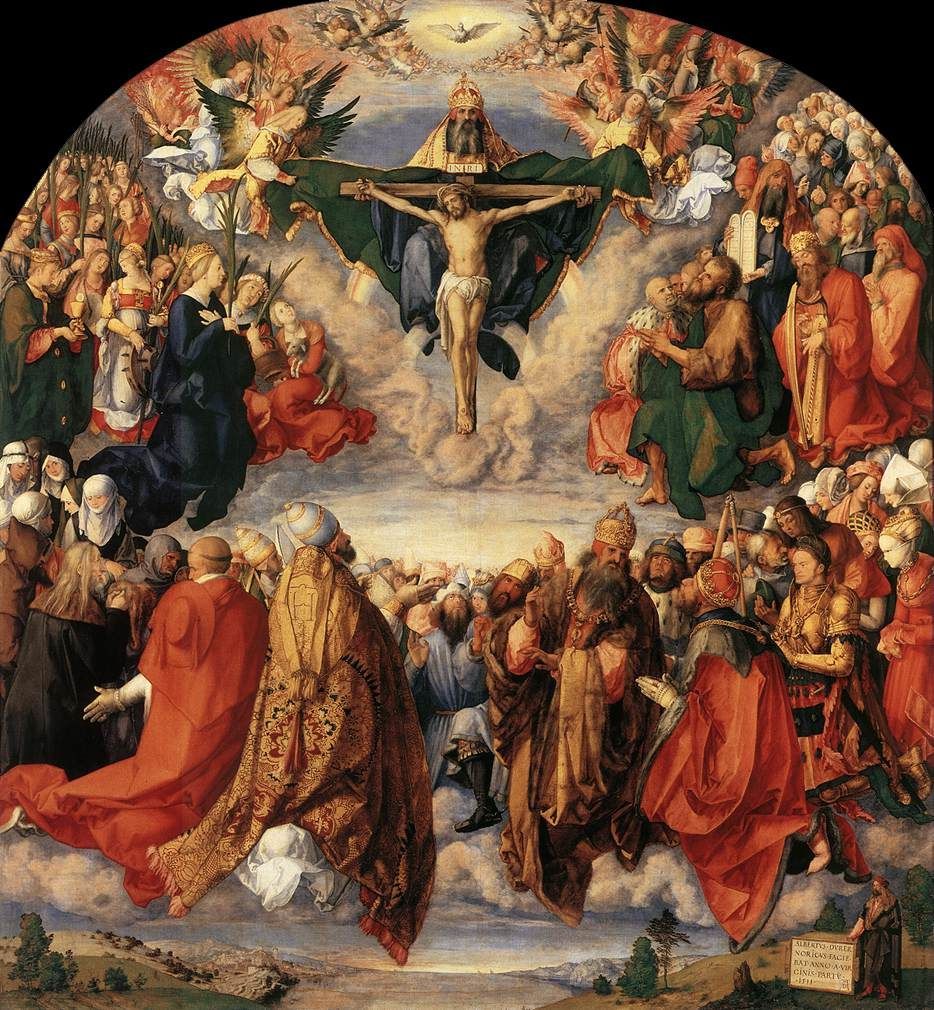
Adoration of the Trinity, Albrecht Dürer

Below are the first two verses of Michael Weisse's advent hymn with the English translation of John Gambold.

Lob sei dem allmächtigen Gott,
der unser sich erbarmet hat,
gefandt sein allerliebsten Sohn,
aus ihm geborn im höchsten Thron,
∘∘∘
auf daß er unser Heiland würd,
uns freiet von der Sündenbürd
und durch sein Gnade und Wahrheit
führet zur ewigen Klarheit.

Translation:

To God we render thanks and praise,
Who pitied mankind's fallen race,
And gave His dear and only Son
That us, as children, He might own.
∘∘∘
He came to seek and save the lost;
We sinned, and He would bear the cost.
That we might share eternal bliss;
O what unbounded love was this!

The cantus firmus for this chorale prelude originates in the Gregorian chant Conditor alme siderum. Although in the phrygian mode, Bach slightly modifies it, replacing some B♭s by B♮s in the melody, but still ends in the key of A. The accompaniment is composed of two motifs, both suspirans: one in the inner parts contains a joy motif; and the other, shared between all three lower parts, is formed of three semiquavers (16th notes) and a longer note or just four semiquavers. In the pedal part this prominent descending motif has been taken to symbolise the "coming down of divine Majesty". Some commentators have suggested that the motion of the inner parts in parallel thirds or sixths might represent the Father and Son in the hymn. Albert Riemenschneider described the lower voices as creating "an atmosphere of dignified praise".

=== Christmas BWV 603–612 ===
- BWV 603 Puer natus in Bethlehem [A boy is born in Bethlehem]

MIDI rendition

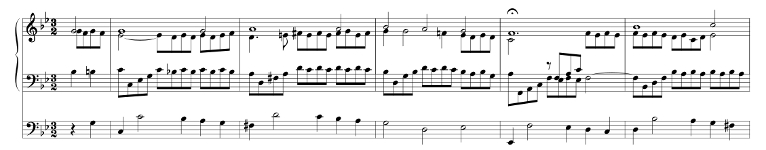

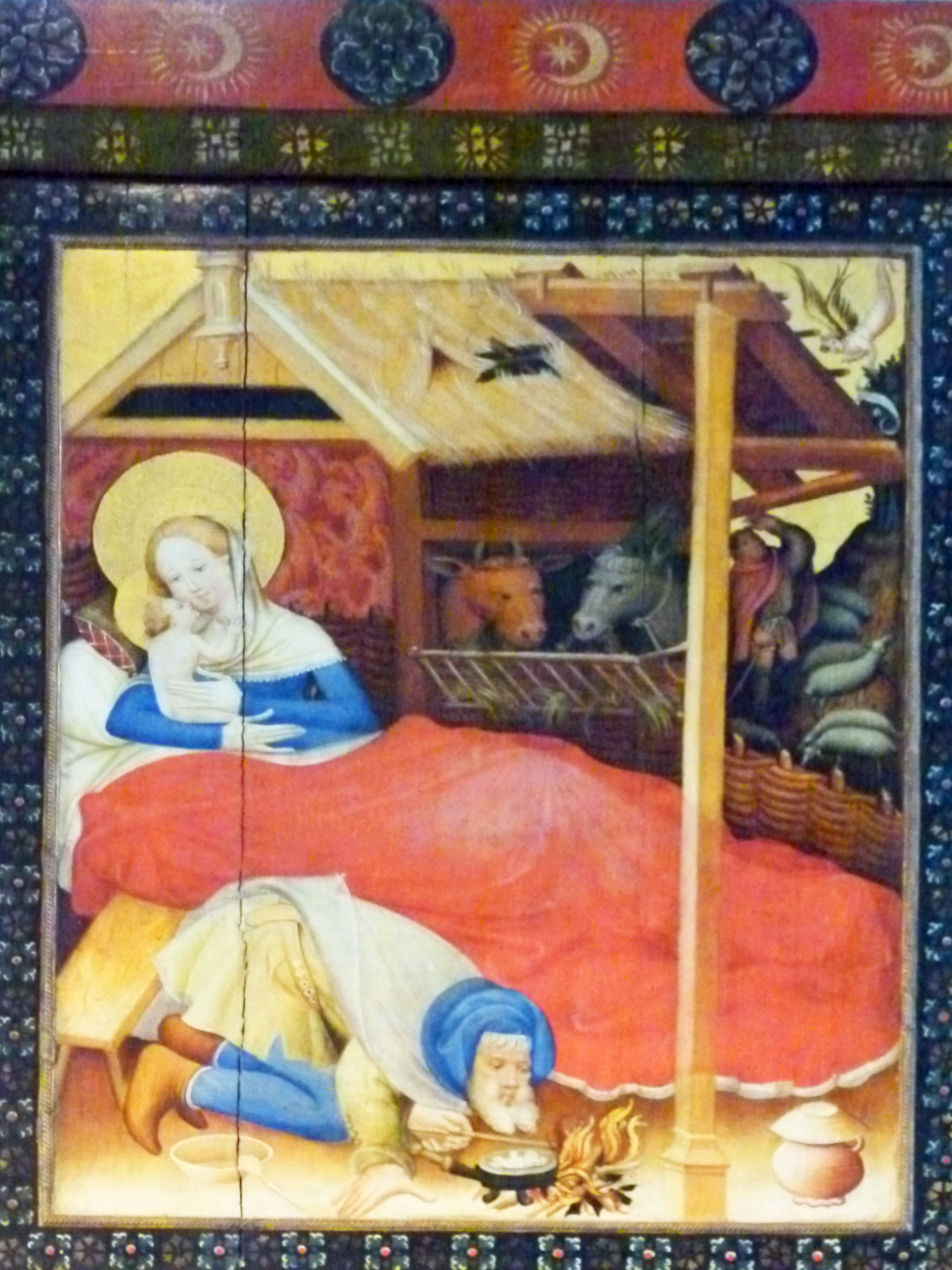
The Nativity, Wildungen altarpiece of Konrad von Soest

Below is the first verse of the traditional Latin carol Puer natus in Bethlehem with the English translation of Hamilton Montgomerie MacGill.

Puer natus est in Bethlehem, unde gaudet Ierusalem! Alleluia, alleluia!	A Child is born in Bethlehem; Exult for joy, Jerusalem! Allelijah, Allelujah!

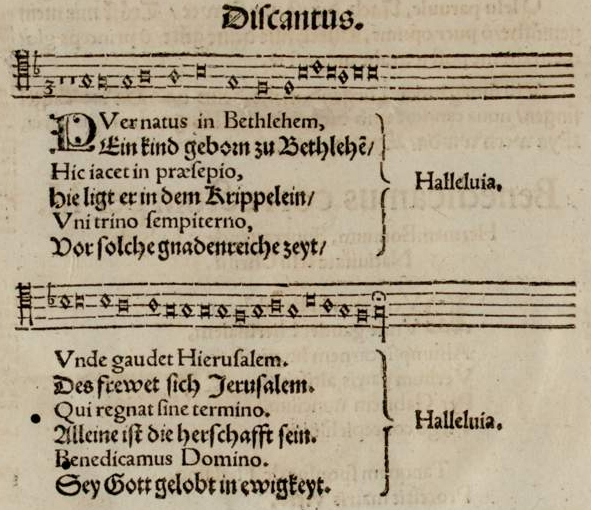
Treble part of Puer natus in Bethlehem, Lossius 1553

The cantus firmus in the soprano voice of this chorale prelude is a slight variant of the treble part of a four-part setting of Puer natus by Lossius. The chorale prelude is in four parts for single manual and pedals. It is unusual in that in most published versions no repeats are marked. However, in the autograph score there are markings by Bach at the end of the score which might indicate that a repeat of the whole prelude was envisaged with first and second time versions for the last bar. Some recent editions have incorporated this suggestion. The two inner voices and pedal follow the usual Orgelbüchlein pattern, providing a harmonious accompaniment, with gently rocking quavers in the inner voices and a repeated motif in the pedal, rising first and then descending in crotchet steps. Various commentators have proposed interpretations of the accompanying motifs: the rocking motif to suggest the action of swaddling; and the pedal motif as symbolising either the "journey of the Magi" to Bethlehem (Schweitzer (1905)) or Christ's "descent to earth" (Chailley (1974)). On a purely musical level, a mood of increasing wonder is created as the accompaniment intensifies throughout the chorale with more imitative entries in the inner parts.

- BWV 604 Gelobet seist du, Jesu Christ [Praised be you, Jesus Christ] a 2 Clav. et Ped.

MIDI rendition

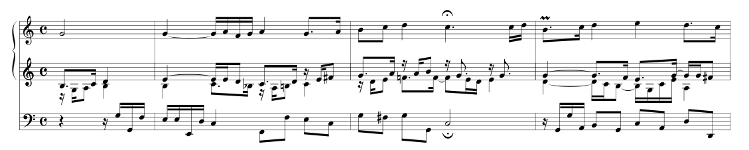

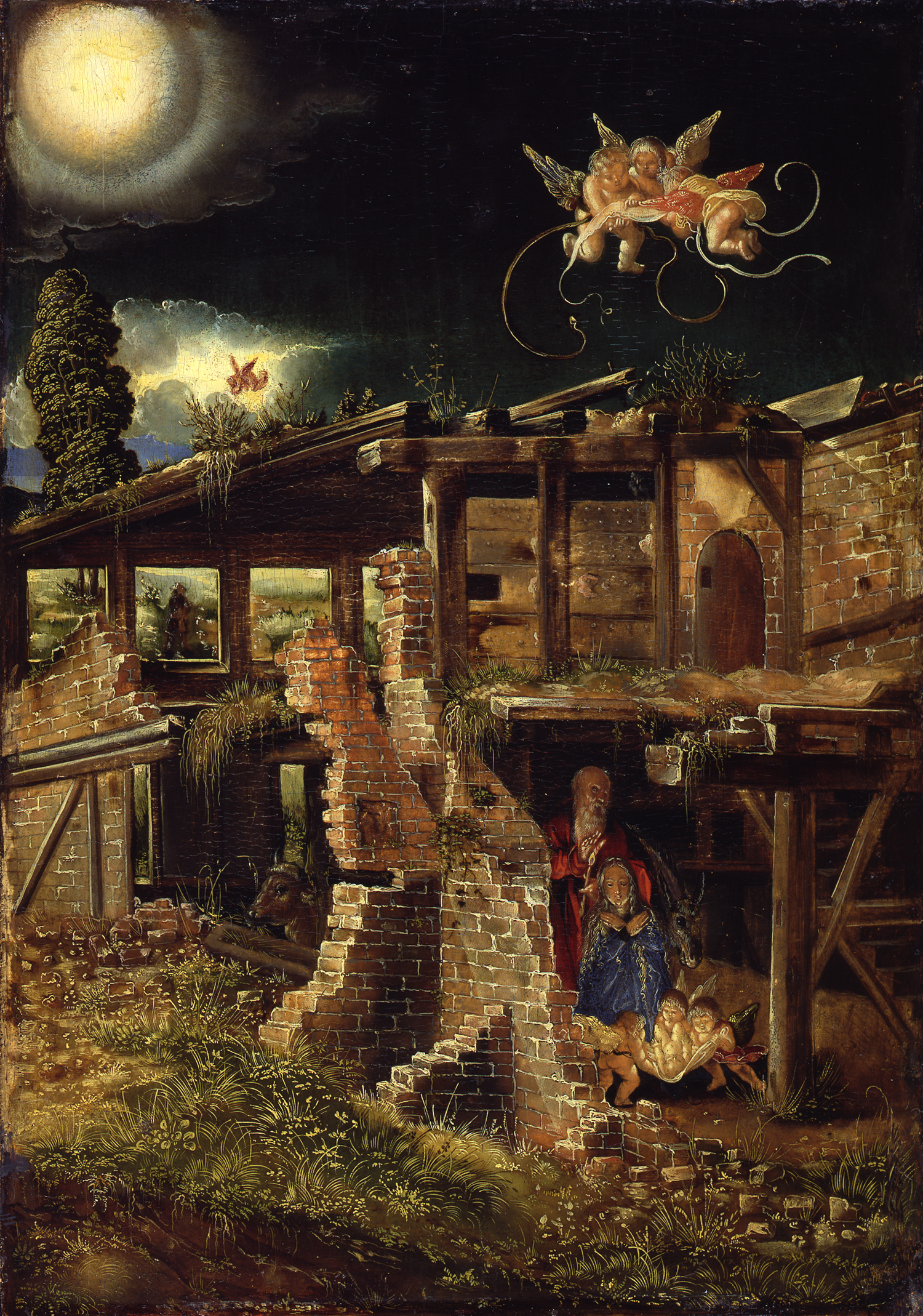
The Nativity, Albrecht Altdorfer

Below is the first verse of Martin Luther's version "Gelobet seist du, Jesu Christ" (1524) of the traditional Christmas hymn Gratis nunc omnes reddamus, with the English translation of Myles Coverdale.

Gelobet seist du, Jesu Christ, dass du Mensch geboren bist von einer Jungfrau, das ist wahr; des freuet sich der Engel Schar. Kyrieleis!	Now blessed be Thou, Christ Jesu; Thou art man borne, this is true: The aungels made a mery noyse, Yet have we more cause to rejoyse. Kirieleyson.

Bach used the same hymn in other organ compositions as well as in the cantatas BWV 64, 91 and 248, parts I and III (the Christmas Oratorio). The chorale prelude is scored for two manuals and pedal, with the cantus firmus in the soprano voice on the upper manual. On the lower manual the two inner voices provide the harmonic accompaniment, moving stepwise in alternating semiquavers. The pedal part responds throughout with a constantly varying motif involving octave semiquaver leaps. The chorale prelude is in the mixolydian mode. Combined with the unadorned but singing melody and its gentle accompaniment, this produces a mood of tenderness and rapture.

- BWV 605 Der Tag, der ist so freudenreich [The day is so full of joy] a 2 Clav. et Ped.

MIDI rendition

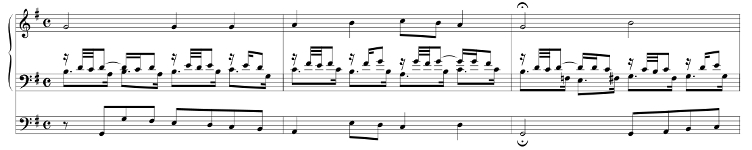

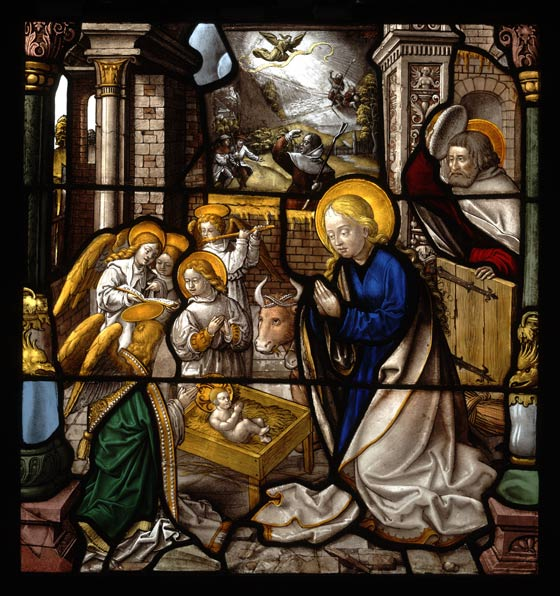
The Nativity, early 16th-century stained glass from Mariawald Abbey near Cologne

Below is the German version of the Christmas hymn Dies est latitiae with the English translation by Charles Sanford Terry.

Der Tag, der is so freudenreich aller Kreature, denn Gottes Sohn vom Himmelreich über die Nature von einer Jungfrau is geboren, Maria, du bist auserkoren das du Mutter wärest. Was geschah so wunderlich? Gottes Sohn vom Himmelreich, der is Mensch geboren. ∘∘∘ Ein Kindelein so löbelich ist uns geboren heute von einer Jungfrau säuberlich zu Trost uns armen Leuten. Wär uns das Kindein nicht geboren, so wären wir allzumal verloren; das Heil is unser aller. Ei du süsser Jesu Christ, dass du Mensch geboren bist, behüttet uns vor der Holle!	O hail this brightest day of days, All good Christian people! For Christ hath come upon our ways, Ring it from the steeple! Of maiden pure is He the Son; For ever shall thy praise be sung, Christ's fair mother Mary! Ever was there news so great? God's own Son from heaven's high state Is born the Son of Mary! ∘∘∘ This day the wondrous Child is born, Lent to earth from heaven. He comes to cheer a world forlorn, Its heavy sin to leaven. So, sing ye all the glorious birth Which doth redeem our fallen earth, And works our salvation. Laud to Thee, Child Jesu Christ! With mankind Thou'st kept the tryst Thou Star of every nation.

The melody, medieval in origin, was published with the text in 1529. Apart from BWV 606, Bach composed a harmonisation of the hymn in BWV 294 and set it as a chorale prelude, BWV 719 in the Neumeister Collection. The chorale prelude BWV 605 is written for two manuals and pedal with the cantus firmus in the soprano part. The frequent F♮s are a hint of the mixolydian mode. The accompanying motif is shared between the two inner voices on the second manual which together provide a continuous stream of semiquavers with two hemidemiquavers on the second semiquaver of each group. The pedal provides a rhythmic pulse with a semiquaver walking bass with sustained notes at each cadence. Williams (2003) suggests that the relative simplicity of BWV 605 and the uniformity of the accompaniment could be signs that it was one of the earliest composed pieces in Orgelbüchlein. Dissonances in the pedal in bars 3 and 5, however, could also be signs of Bach's more mature style. Ernst Arfken and Siegfried Vogelsänger have interpreted some of the dissonant F♮s as references to elements of foreboding in the text (for example Ei du süsser Jesu Christ in the second verse). The accompanying figure in the inner voices has been interpreted as a joy motif by Schweitzer (1905); as an evocation of rocking by Keller (1948); and as symbolising the miracle of virgin birth by Arfken. Many commentators have agreed with Spitta (1899) that the lively and rhythmic accompaniment conveys "Christmas joy".

- BWV 606 Vom Himmel hoch, da komm ich her [From Heaven on high I come here]

MIDI rendition

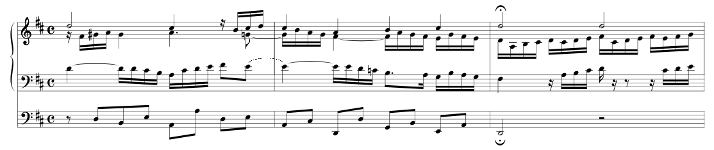

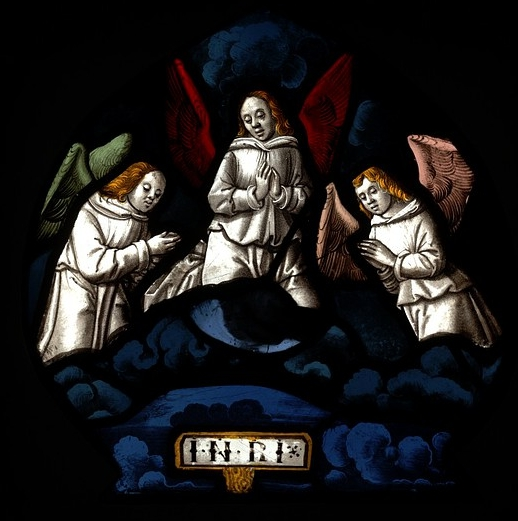
Three angels, early 16th-century stained glass from Germany

Below are the first, second and last verses of the Christmas hymn Vom Himmel hoch, da komm ich her by Martin Luther with the English translation of Catherine Winkworth.

Vom Himmel hoch, da komm ich her. ich bring' euch gute neue Mär, der guten Mär bring ich so viel, davon ich singn und sagen will. ∘∘∘ Euch ist ein Kindlein heut' geborn Von einer Jungfrau auserkorn, Ein Kindelein, so zart und fein, Das soll eu'r Freud und Wonne sein. ∘∘∘ Lob, Ehr sei Gott im höchsten Thron, Der uns schenkt seinen ein'gen Sohn. Des freuen sich der Engel Schar Und singen uns solch neues Jahr.	From Heaven above to earth I come To bear good news to every home; Glad tidings of great joy I bring Whereof I now will say and sing: ∘∘∘ To you this night is born a child Of Mary, chosen mother mild; This little child, of lowly birth, Shall be the joy of all your earth. ∘∘∘ Glory to God in highest Heaven, Who unto man His Son hath given! While angels sing with pious mirth A glad New Year to all the earth.

Cantus firmus, "Vom Himmel hoch da komm' ich her", Lutheran hymnbook, 1539

The melody of Vom Himmel hoch was published in 1539. The hymn was performed throughout the Christmas period, particularly during nativity plays. Many composers set it to music for both chorus and organ: closest to Bach's time, Pachelbel and Johann Walther wrote chorale preludes. Bach's use of the hymn in his choral works includes the Magnificat, BWV 243 and 3 settings in the Christmas Oratorio, BWV 248. Apart from BWV 606, his organ settings include the early chorale preludes BWV 701 and 702 from the Kirnberger Collection and BWV 738 from the Neumeister Collection; the five Canonic Variations, BWV 769 were composed towards the end of his life.

The chorale prelude BWV 606 is written for single manual and pedal with the cantus firmus in the soprano part. As in all his other organ settings, Bach changed the rhythmic structure of the melody by drawing out the initial upbeats to long notes. This contrasts with Bach's choral settings and the chorale preludes of Pachelbel and Walther, which follow the natural rhythm of the hymn. In BWV 606, the rhythm is further obscured by the cadences of the second and final lines falling on the third beat of the bar. The accompaniment on the keyboard is built from semiquaver motifs, made up of four-note groups of suspirans semiquavers (starting with a rest or "breath"). These include turning figures and ascending or descending scales all presented in the first bar. The semiquaver figures, sometimes in parallel thirds or sixths, run continuously throughout the upper parts, including the soprano part, further obscuring the melody. Below the upper voices, there is a striding pedal part in quavers with alternate footing. In the two closing bars, there is a fleeting appearance of figures usually associated with crucifixion chorales, such as Da Jesus an dem Kreuzer stund, BWV 621: semiquaver cross motifs in the upper parts above delayed or dragging entries in the pedal.

The predominant mood of the chorale prelude is one of joyous exultation. The semiquaver motifs, in constant motion upwards and downwards, create what Schweitzer (1905) called "a charming maze", symbolising angels heralding the birth of Christ. As Anton Heiller and others have observed, the brief musical allusions to the crucifixion in the closing bars bring together themes from Christmas and Easter, a momentary reminder that Christ came into the world to suffer; in the words of Clark & Peterson (1984), "Christ's Incarnation and Passion are inseparable, and Bach tried to express this through musical means."

- BWV 607 Vom Himmel kam der Engel Schar

MIDI rendition

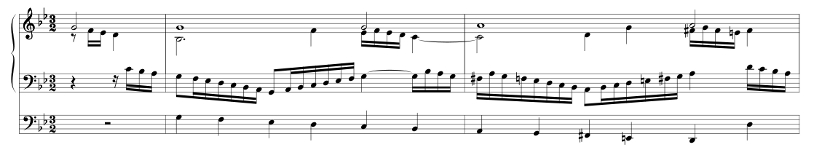

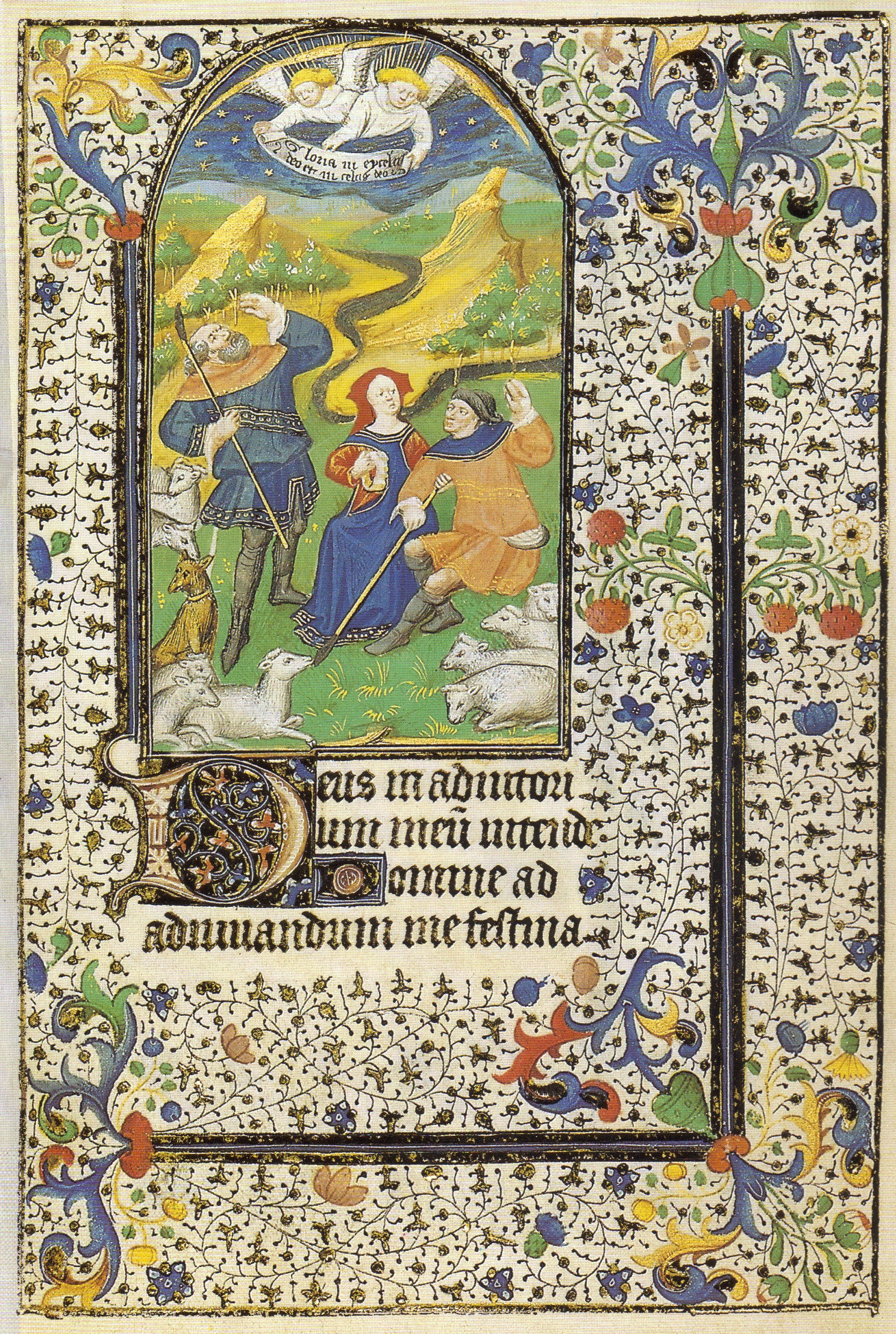
Annunciation to the shepherds, 15th-century book of hours, Mainz

Below are the first and fourth verses of Martin Luther's Christmas hymn Vom Himmel kam der Engel Schar with the English translation of Catherine Winkworth.

Vom Himmel kam der Engel Schar, erschien den Hirten offenbar; sie sagten ihn'n: ein Kindlein zart, das liegt dort in der Krippe hart ∘∘∘ Was kann euch tun die Sünd' und Tod? Ihr habt mit euch den wahren Gott. laßt zuernen Teufel und die Höll' Gott's Sohn ist worden eu'r Gesell.	From heaven the angel-troop come near, And to the shepherds plain appear: A tender little child, they cry, In a rough manger lies hard by. ∘∘∘ What can death do to you, or sin? The true God is to you come in. Let hell and Satan raging go — The Son of God's your comrade now.

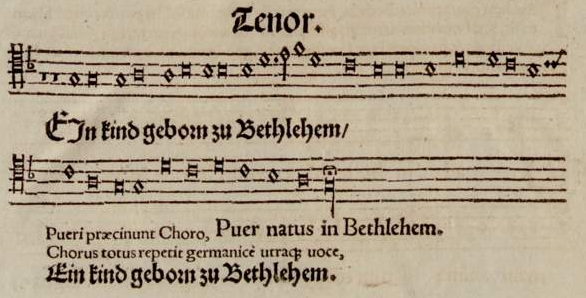
Tenor part of Puer natus in Bethlehem, Lossius 1553

The cantus firmus of this chorale prelude is in the soprano voice and is drawn from the tenor part of the four-part setting of Puer natus by Lossius. It is the only time that Bach used this hymn tune. Although there is some ambiguity in the autograph manuscript, the crossing of parts suggests that the intended scoring is for single manual and pedals. The motifs in the intricately crafted accompaniment are descending and ascending scales, sometimes in contrary motion, with rapid semiquaver scales shared between the inner voices and slower crotchet scales in the walking bass of the pedal part following each phrase of the melody. The mood of the chorale prelude is "ethereal" and "scintillating", veering elusively between the contemplative harmonised melody and the transitory rushing scales: towards the close the scales in the inner voices envelope the melody. The semiquaver motifs have been taken to represent flights of angels in the firmament: for Spitta (1899), "Bach's music rushes down and up again like the descending and ascending messengers of heaven."

- BWV 608 In dulci jubilo [In sweet joy]

MIDI rendition

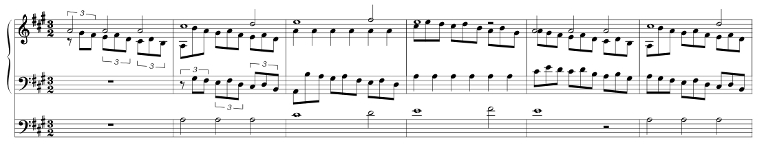

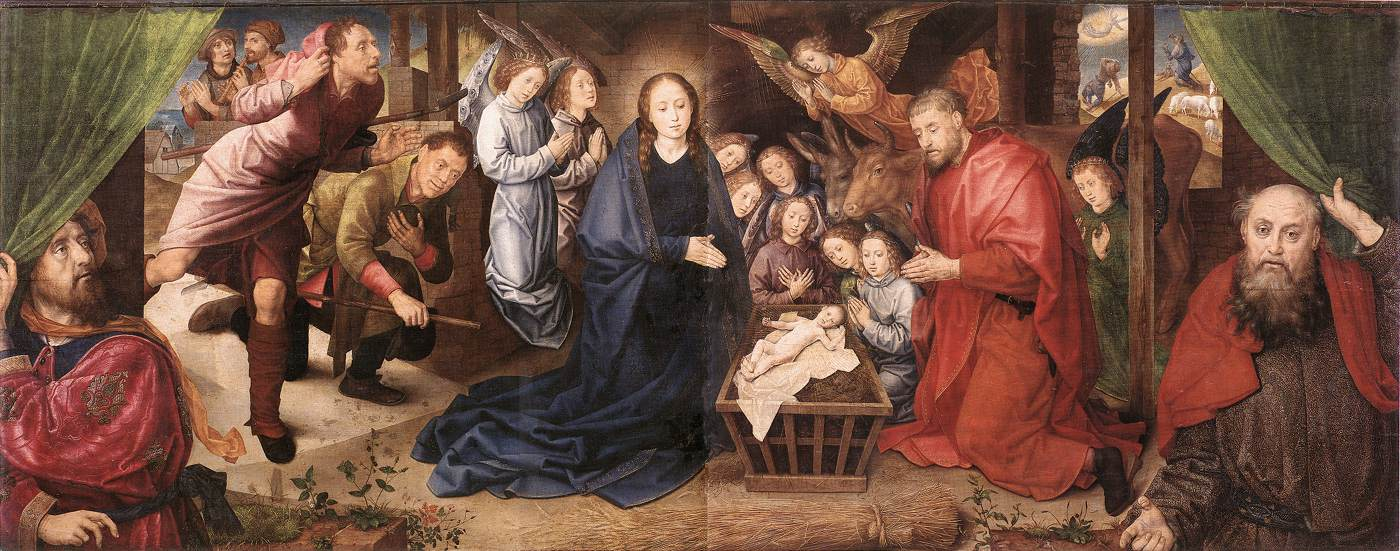
Adoration of the Shepherds, Hugo van der Goes

Below is the traditional fourteenth century German/Latin Christmas carol In dulci jubilo with the English/Latin translation of Robert Lucas de Pearsall.

In dulci jubilo, nun singet und seid froh! Unsers Herzens Wonne leit in praesepio, und leuchtet als die Sonne matris in gremio, Alpha es et O! ∘∘∘ O Jesu parvule nach dir ist mir so weh! Tröst mir mein Gemüte O puer optime durch alle deine Güte O princeps gloriae. Trahe me post te! ∘∘∘ O patris caritas, o nati lenitas! Wir wären all verloren per nostra crimina, so hat er uns erworben coelorum gaudia. Eia wären wir da! ∘∘∘ Ubi sunt gaudia nirgend mehr denn da! da die Engel singen nova cantica, und die Schellen klingen in regis curia. Eia, wären wir da!	In dulci jubilo Let us our homage shew: Our heart's joy reclineth In praesepio; And like a bright star shineth Matris in gremio, Alpha es et O! ∘∘∘ O Jesu parvule, My heart is sore for Thee! Hear me, I beseech Thee, O puer optime; My praying let it reach Thee, O princeps gloriae. Trahe me post te. ∘∘∘ O patris caritas! O Nati lenitas! Deeply were we stained. Per nostra crimina: But Thou for us hast gained Coelorum gaudia, O that we were there! ∘∘∘ Ubi sunt gaudia, If that they be not there? There are Angels singing Nova cantica; And there the bells are ringing In Regis curia. O that we were there!

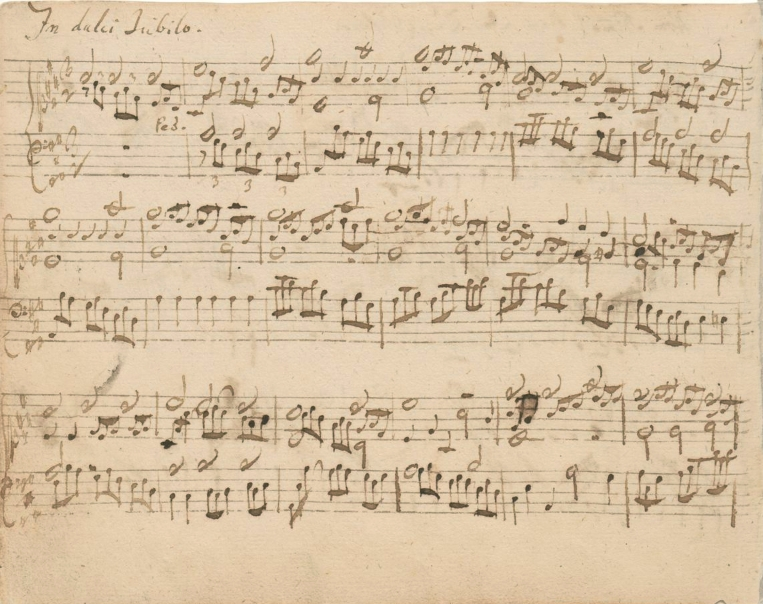
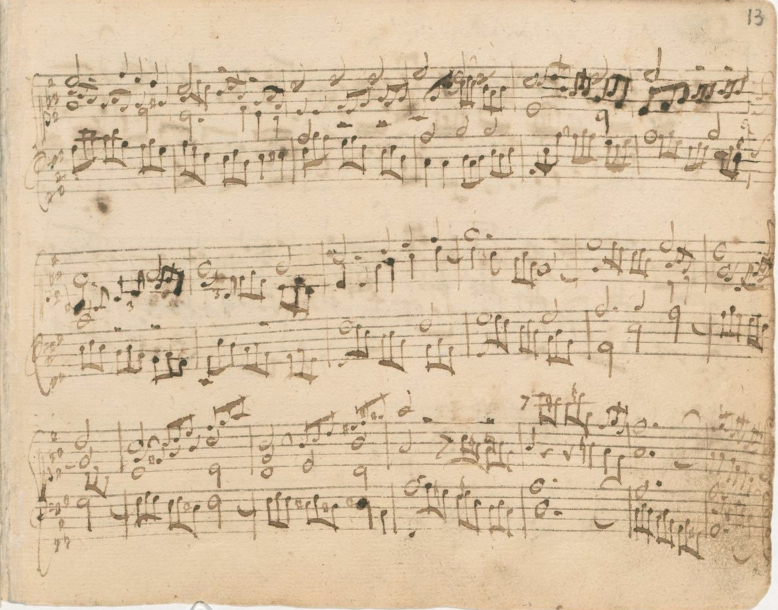
The two pages of "In dulci jubilo" in the autograph manuscript

This chorale prelude is based on a traditional Christmas carol in canon that predates Luther. Prior to Bach, there had been settings of the carol as a canon by Fridolin Sicher and Johann Walther for organ and by Michael Praetorius for choir. Bach's chorale prelude is written for single manual and pedals, with the leading voice in the soprano. The canon—normally in the tenor part in the carol—is taken up one bar later in the pedal. As was Bach's custom, it was notated in the autograph manuscript at the pitch at which it should sound, although this fell outside the range of baroque pedalboards. The desired effect was achieved by using a 4′ pedal stop, playing the pedals an octave lower. The two accompanying inner voices, based on a descending triplet motif, are also in canon at the octave: such a double canon is unique amongst Bach's organ chorales. Following baroque convention, Bach notated the triplets in the accompaniment as quavers instead of crotchets, to make the score more readable for the organist. The accompaniment also has repeated crotchets on the single note of A, which, combined with the A's in the main canon, simulate the drone of a musette sounding constantly through the chorale until the A♯ in bar 25. At that point the strict canon in the accompaniment stops, but the imitative triplet motif continues until the close, also passing effortlessly into the soprano part. Over the final pedal point, it sounds in all three of the upper voices. There is some ambiguity as to whether Bach intended the crotchets in the accompanying motif to be played as a dotted rhythm in time with the triplets or as two beats against three. The deliberate difference in spacing in the autograph score and the intended drone-like effect might suggest adopting the second solution throughout, although modern editions often contain a combination of the two.

The piping triplets above the musette drone create a gentle pastoral mood, in keeping with the subject of the carol. For Williams (2003) the constant sounding of A major chords, gently embellished by the accompaniment, suggest unequivocally the festive spirit of the dulci and jubilo in the title; Schweitzer (1905) already described the accompanying triplets as representing a "direct and naive joy". Williams further suggests that the F♯ major chord at bar 25 might be a reference to leuchtet als die Sonne ("shines like the sun") in the first verse; and the long pedal point at the close to Alpha es et Omega ("You are the Alpha and the Omega") at the end of the first verse. The mood also reflects the first two lines of the third verse, "O love of the father, O gentleness of the newborn!" Bach often used canons in his chorale preludes to signify the relation between "leader" and "follower" as in his settings of Dies sind die heil'gen zehn Gebot ("These are the Ten Commandments"); Stinson (1999) considers that this was unlikely to be the case here, despite the words Trahe me post te ("Draw me to thee") in the second verse.

- BWV 609 Lobt Gott, ihr Christen, allzugleich [Praise God, you Christians all together]

MIDI rendition

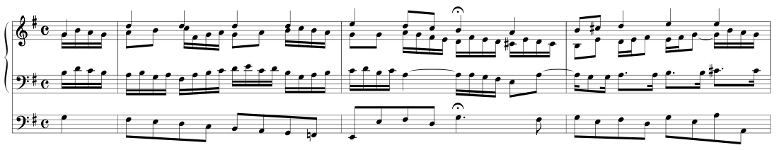

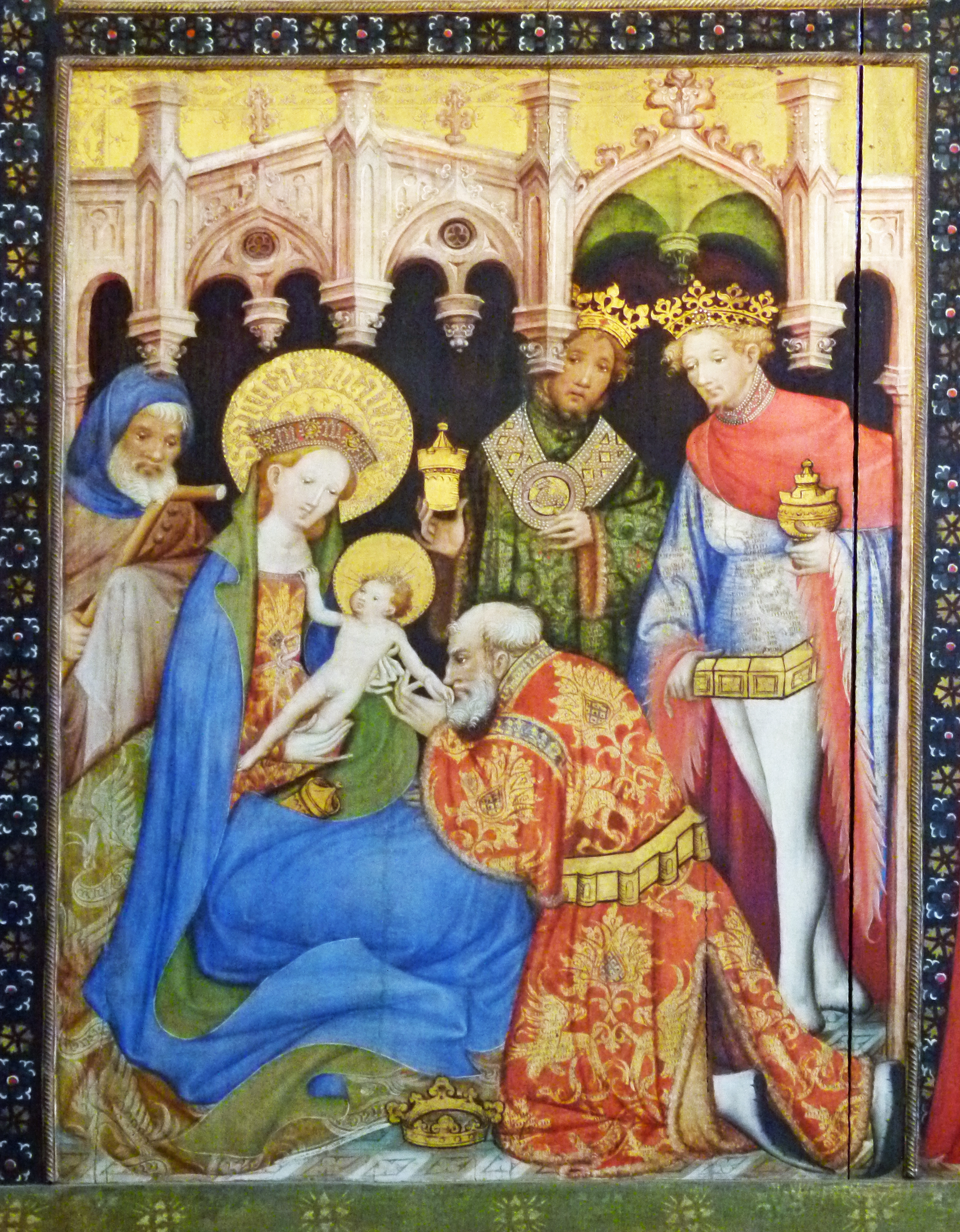
Adoration of the Magi, Wildungen altarpiece of Konrad von Soest

Below are the first and last verses of Nikolaus Herman's Christmas hymn with the English translation by Arthur Tozer Russell.

Lobt Gott, ihr Christen, allzugleich, in seinem höchsten Thron, der heut schließt auf sein Himmelreich und schenkt uns seinen Sohn. ∘∘∘ Das aus seinem Stamm entsprießen sollt in dieser letzten Zeit, durch welchen Gott aufrichten wollt sein Reich, die Christenheit.	Let all together praise our God Upon His lofty throne; He hath His heavens unclosed to-day, And given to us His Son. ∘∘∘ The glorious gates of Paradise The cherub guards no more; This day again those gates unfolds! With praise our God adore!

The melody first appeared with this text in a 1580 hymnbook. Prior to Bach, there were choral settings by Michael Praetorius and Samuel Scheidt and a setting for organ in the choral prelude BuxWV 202 by Dieterich Buxtehude. Apart from BWV 609, Bach set the hymn in the cantatas BWV 151 and 195, the two harmonisations BWV 375 and 376 and the chorale prelude BWV 732. The chorale prelude BWV 609 is scored for single manual and pedal with the cantus firmus unembellished in the soprano voice. The accompaniment in the inner voices is a uniform stream of semiquavers shared between the parts, often in parallel sixths but occasionally in contrary motion. It is built up from several four-note semiquaver motifs first heard in the opening bars. Beneath them in the pedal is a contrasting walking bass in quavers with sustained notes at the end of each phrase. Unlike the inner voices, the pedal part has a wide range: there are two scale-like passages where it rises dramatically through two octaves, covering all the notes from the lowest D to the highest D. The four voices together convey a mood of joyous exultation. Stinson (1999) speculates that the passages ascending through all the notes of the pedalboard might symbolise the word allzugleich ("all together"); and Clark & Peterson (1984) suggest that the widening intervals at the start between the cantus and the descending pedal part might symbolise the opening up of the heavens (schließt auf sein Himmelreich).

- BWV 610 Jesu, meine Freude [Jesus, my joy]

MIDI rendition

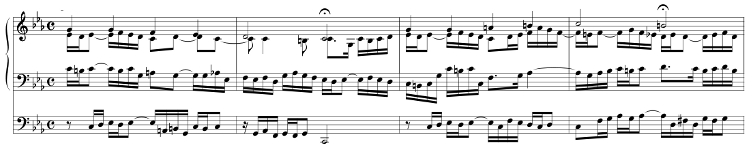

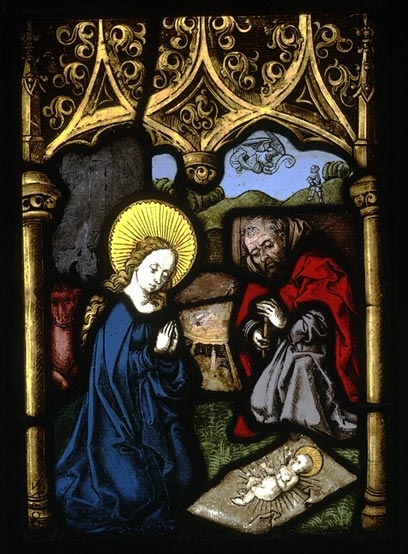
Adoration of the Christ Child, early 16th-century Germany stained glass panel

Below are the first two verses of Johann Frank's hymn Jesu, meine Freude with the English translation by Catherine Winkworth.

Jesu, meine Freude, meines Herzens Weide, Jesu, meine Zier, ach, wie lang, ach lange ist dem Herzen bange und verlangt nach dir! Gotteslamm, mein Bräutigam, außer dir soll mir auf Erden nichts sonst Liebers werden! ∘∘∘ Unter deinem Schirmen bin ich vor den Stürmen aller Feinde frei. Laß den Satan wittern, laß die Welt erschüttern, mir steht Jesus bei. Ob es jetzt gleich kracht und blitzt, obgleich Sünd' und Hölle schrecken, Jesus will mich decken.	Jesu, priceless treasure, Source of purest pleasure, Truest Friend to me; Ah! how long I've panted, And my heart hath fainted, Thirsting, Lord, for Thee! Thine I am, O spotless Lamb, I will suffer nought to hide Thee, Nought I ask beside Thee. ∘∘∘ In Thine arm I rest me, Foes who would molest me Cannot reach me here; Though the earth be shaking, Every heart be quaking, Jesus calms my fear; Sin and hell in conflict fell With their bitter storms assail me; Jesus will not fail me.

The melody was first published with the text in Johann Crüger's hymnal Praxis pietatis melica of 1653. In later hymnbooks the hymn became associated with Christmas and Epiphany; it was also frequently included amongst the so-called Jesuslieder, devotional hymns addressed to Jesus, often for private use. One of the earliest settings of the hymn was Dieterich Buxtehude's cantata BuxWV 60 for four voices, strings and continuo, composed in the 1680s. Bach's friend and colleague Johann Walther composed an organ partita on the hymn in 1712. Apart from BWV 610, Bach's organ settings include the chorale preludes BWV 713 in the Kirnberger Collection, BWV 1105 in the Neumeister Collection and BWV 753 composed in 1720. Amongst his choral settings are the harmonisation BWV 358, the motet BWV 227 for unaccompanied choir and cantatas BWV 12, 64, 81 and 87.

The chorale prelude BWV 610 is scored for single manual and pedal, with the cantus firmus unadorned in the soprano voice. Marked Largo, the cantus and accompanying voices in the two inner parts and pedal are written at an unusually low pitch, creating a sombre effect. The accompaniment is based on semiquaver motifs first heard in their entirety in the pedal in bar one; the inner parts often move in parallel thirds followed by quasi-ostinato responses in the pedal. The rich and complex harmonic structure is partly created by dissonances arising from suspensions and occasional chromaticisms in the densely scored accompanying voices: the motifs are skillfully developed but with restraint.

Both Williams (2003) and Stinson (1999) concur with the assessment of Spitta (1899) that "fervent longing (sehnsuchtsvoll Innigkeit) is marked in every line of the exquisite labyrinth of music in which the master has involved one of his favourite melodies." As Honders (1988) has pointed out, when composing this chorale prelude Bach might have had in mind one of the alternative more intimate texts for the melody such as Jesu, meine Freude, wird gebohren heute, available in contemporary Weimar hymnbooks and reprinted later in Schemellis Gesangbuch of 1736.

- BWV 611 Christum wir sollen loben schon [We should indeed praise Christ] Choral in Alto

MIDI rendition

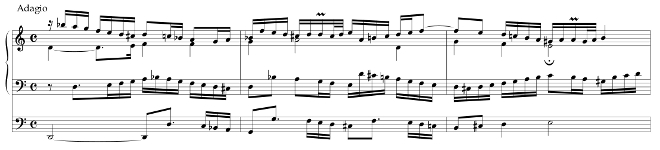

Below is the first verse of Martin Luther's hymn Christum wir sollen loben schon with the English translation of Richard Massie (1854). Luther's text was his version of the Latin hymn A solis ortus cardine, part of the fifth century abecedarius of Coelius Sedulius; it has been inserted between the two. Another extract from Sedulius' poem became the Latin Hymn Hostis herodes impie. The first verse is given below with Luther's German version Was fürchtst du, Feind Herodes, sehr to the same melody. Both verses concern Christ's coming on earth.

Christum wir sollen loben schon, der reinen Magd Marien Sohn, soweit die liebe Sonne leucht't und an aller Welt Ende reicht. ∘∘∘ Was fürchtst du, Feind Herodes, sehr, dass uns geborn kommt Christ der Herr? Er sucht kein sterblich Königreich, der zu uns bringt sein Himmelreich.	A solis ortus cardine ad usque terræ limitem Christum canamus principem, natum Maria virgine. ∘∘∘ Hostis herodes impie, Christum venire quid times? non eripit mortalia, qui regna dat caelestia.	Now praise we, Christ, the Holy One, The spotless Virgin Mary's Son, Far as the blessed sun doth shine, E'en to the world's remote confine. ∘∘∘ Herod, why dreadest thou a foe, Because the Christ comes born below? He seeks no mortal kingdom thus, Who brings His kingdom down to us.

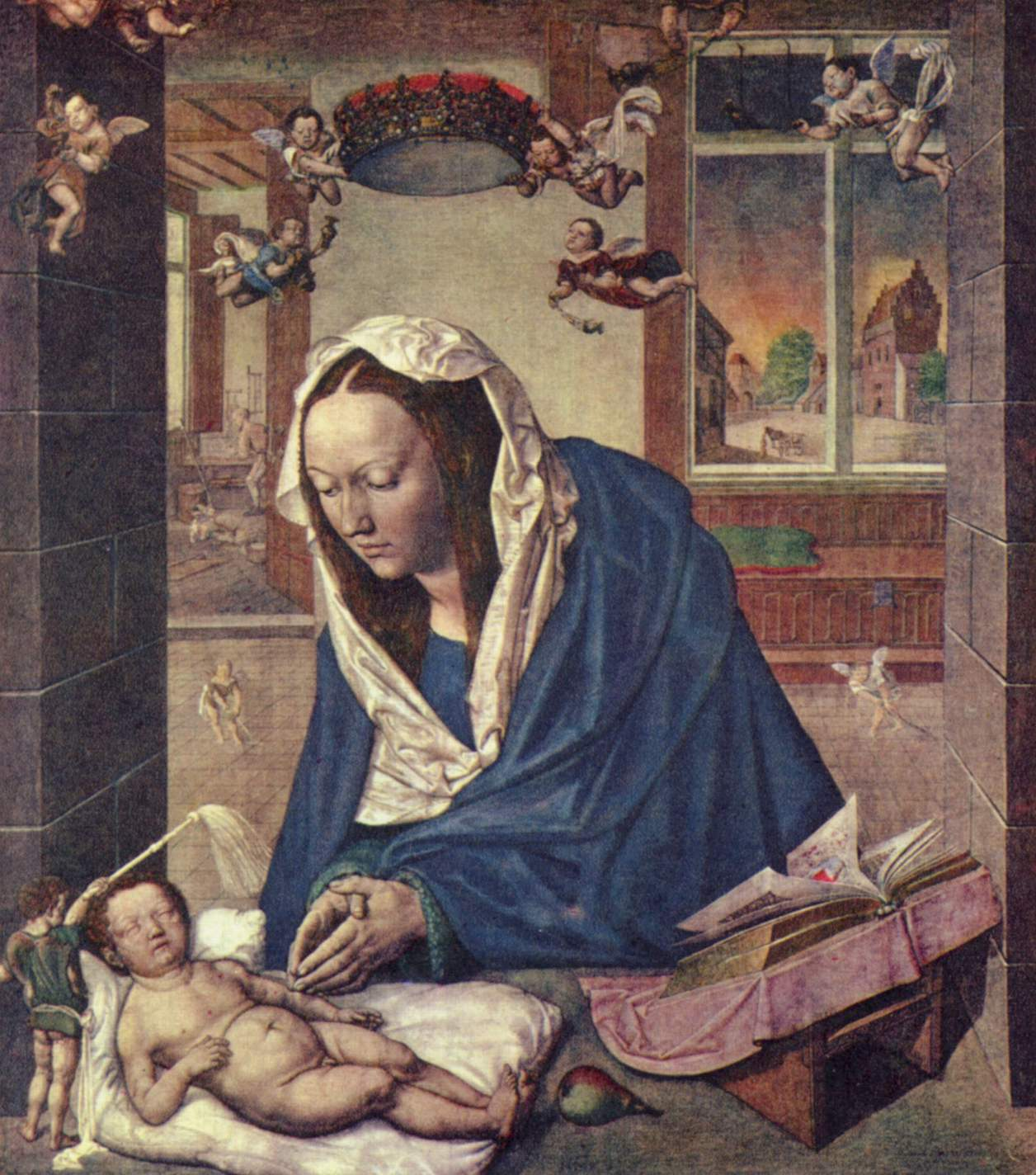
Marienalter, Albrecht Dürer

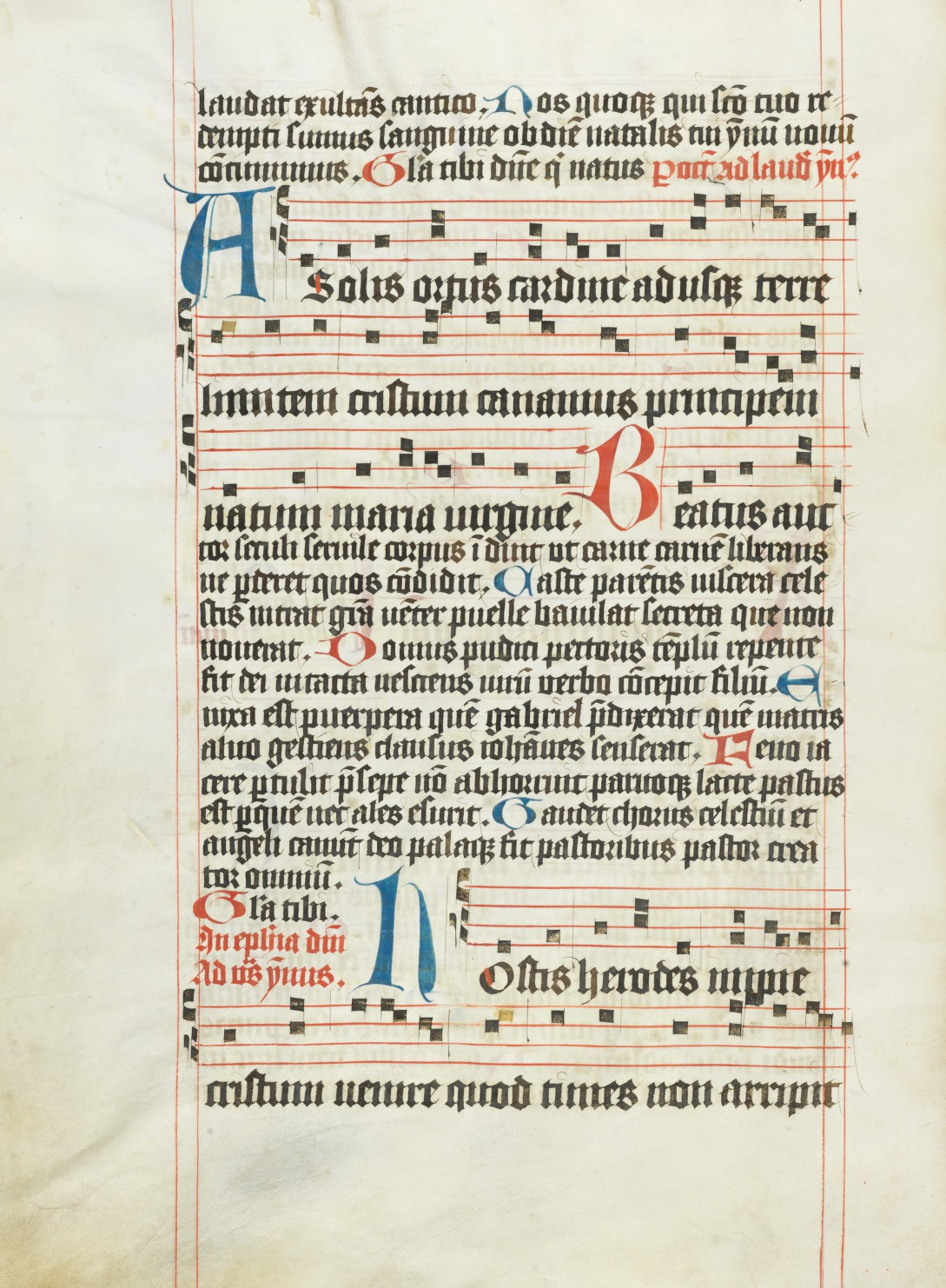
Plainchant melody for A solis ortus cardine, an abecedarius in a late 15th-century antiphonary, Convent of St. Catherine, St. Gallen

The melody of the cantus firmus in the Dorian mode is based on the Latin hymn A solis ortus cardine, which appeared in its Lutheran version in 1524. It was used in settings by Scheidt, Scheidemann, Walther and de Grigny, the latter two employing the Latin title. Apart from BWV 611, Bach set the hymn earlier in BWV 696, a chorale prelude from the Kirnberger Collection, and later in his cantata Christum wir sollen loben schon, BWV 121.

BWV 611, marked Adagio, has several unusual and novel features. In contrast to the densely scored chorale prelude BWV 610, the four parts—augmented to five by the double pedal in the last two bars—are widely spaced employing the full range of the baroque organ. Apart from chorale preludes that are canons, this is the unique Orgelbüchlein prelude where the cantus firmus is in the "middle" alto voice. Scored for single manual and pedal, the accompanying voices are the soprano (right hand), the tenor (left hand) and the bass (pedal). The cantus firmus alto part is in a dotted rhythm shared between the two hands, as if hidden. The accompanying motif derives from a suspirans figure, a four note descending or ascending semiquaver scale starting off the beat; this flowing motif is possibly derived from the hymn melody, moving as it does in steps, albeit much slower. The motif is first heard high up in the soprano voice which is placed in bare relief by the sustained notes and slow-moving melody in the lower parts. In particular the pedal point in the first note of the bass heightens the dramatic effect of the opening by briefly abandoning the usual motivic Orgelbüchlein pattern. After the opening, the four note motif is extended throughout in the bass part to five notes by preceding it by a dotted quaver: the slow tempo facilitates semiquaver scales in the pedal. In the sixth bar the soprano and the bass play the highest and lowest notes in the Weimar organ's register, the two C's above and below middle C. The Bach scholar Hermann Keller has described the resulting musical texture as the most ethereal in the Orgelbüchlein. The "hidden" alto hymn tune, occasionally tinged with chromaticism, imparts a further sense of mystery. Above and below it the scale figures in the three accompanying parts are heard meandering in parallel and sometimes contrary motion. In the eleventh bar the bass's motivic accompaniment pauses for a second pedal point after which it resumes by unexpectedly taking up the cantus firmus in canon—two beats after and two octaves below the alto—until the end of the twelfth bar. At the same time in the eleventh bar the soprano and tenor parts play semiquaver motives in canon separated by a quaver and two octaves, before playing in more transparent imitation in bars 12 and 13. After the cadence at bar 14 from D minor to A minor, the accompaniment is augmented to four voices with a second voice in the pedal, first with motivic semiquaver figures in all the parts in the penultimate bar; and then imitative dactylic joy motifs in the soprano and tenor parts during the closing bar.

There is a precursor of the musical style of BWV 611—the plainchant melody A solis ortus cardine/Hostis herodes impie accompanied by polyphonic scale motifs—in the 1667 Deuxième Livre d'Orgue of Nivers.

Commentators have suggested how the musical form echos the themes of the hymn—the cantus firmus reflecting the mystery of the incarnation, Christ hidden in Mary's womb, and its chromaticism the purity of the virgin. The widely spaced polyphonic texture has been taken as a musical depiction of Sedulius' poetic lines A solis ortus cardine, ad usque terræ limitem—"From the hinge of the rising sun, To the farthest edge of the earth". For Schweitzer (1911a) the opening motivic accompaniment "entwines the chorale melody in a consummately effective way and embraces a whole world of unutterable joy", the adagio is a "mystical contemplation", and the motifs "a joyous exaltation in the soprano".

- BWV 612 Wir Christenleut [We Christians]

BWV 612

MIDI rendition

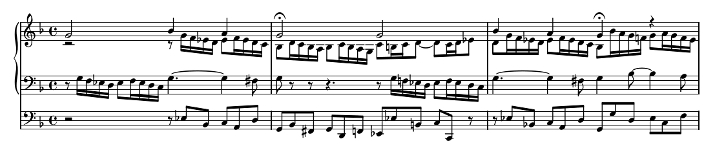

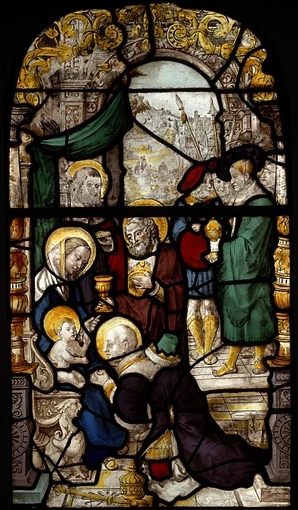
Adoration of the Magi, early 16th-century stained glass from Steinfeld Abbey

Below are the first and third verses of the hymn of Caspar Fuger with the English translation of Catherine Winkworth first published in 1592 with the melody, which predates it.

Wir Christenleut haben jetzund Freud, weil uns zu Trost Christus ist Mensch geboren, hat uns erlöst. Wer sich des tröst', und glaubet fest, soll nicht werden verloren. ∘∘∘ Die Sünd macht Leid; Christus bringt Freud, weil er zu uns in diese Welt ist kommen. Mit uns ist Gott in dieser Not: Wer ist, der jetzt uns Christen kann verdammen?	We Christians may Rejoice to-day, When Christ was born to comfort and to save us; Who thus believes No longer grieves, For none are lost who grasp the hope He gave us. ∘∘∘ Sin brought us grief. But Christ relief, When down to earth He came for our salvation; Since God with us Is dwelling thus. Who dares to speak the Christian's condemnation?

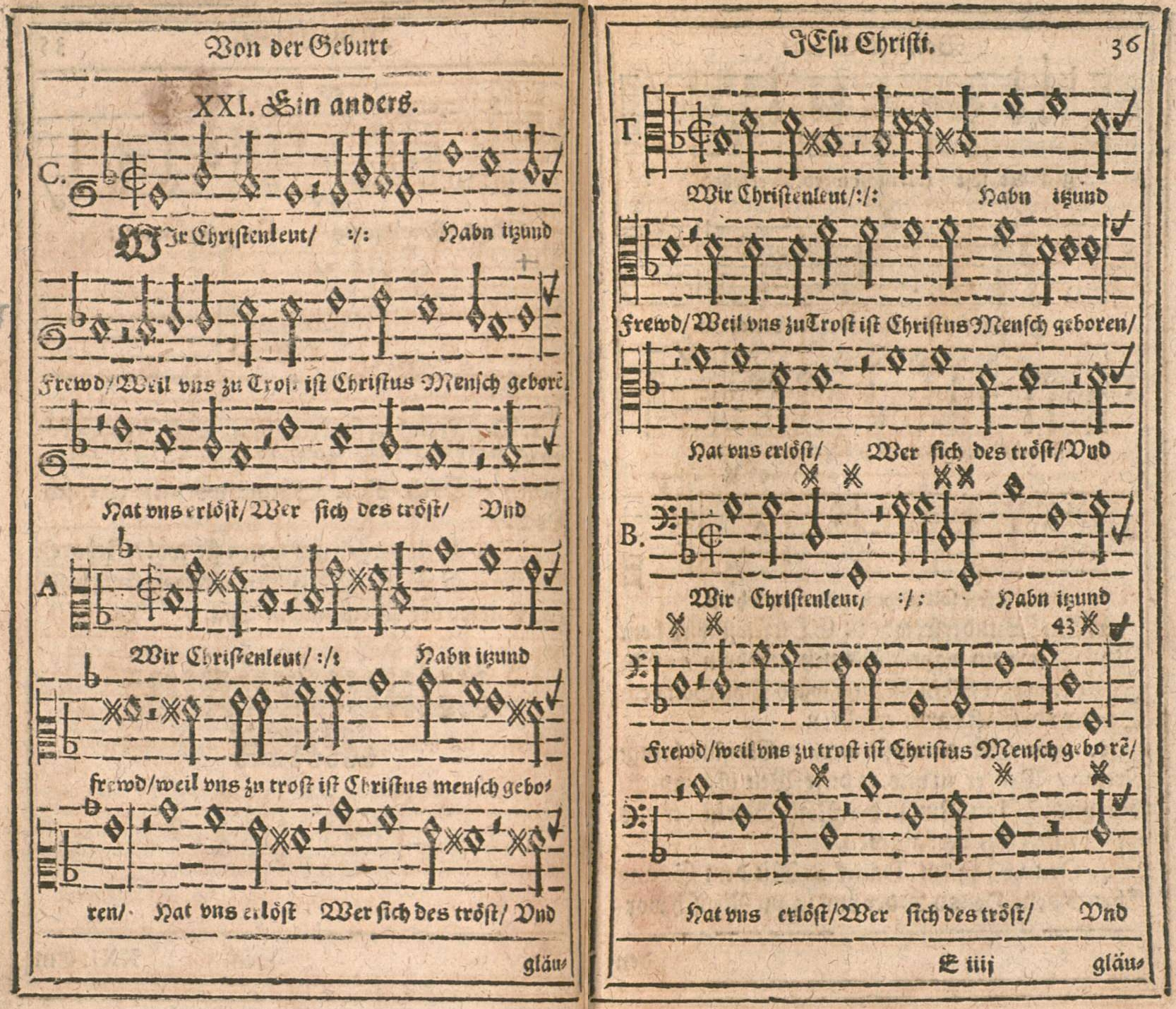
Wir Christenleut in the second edition of the Lutheran Hymnbook of Johann Hermann Schein, 1645

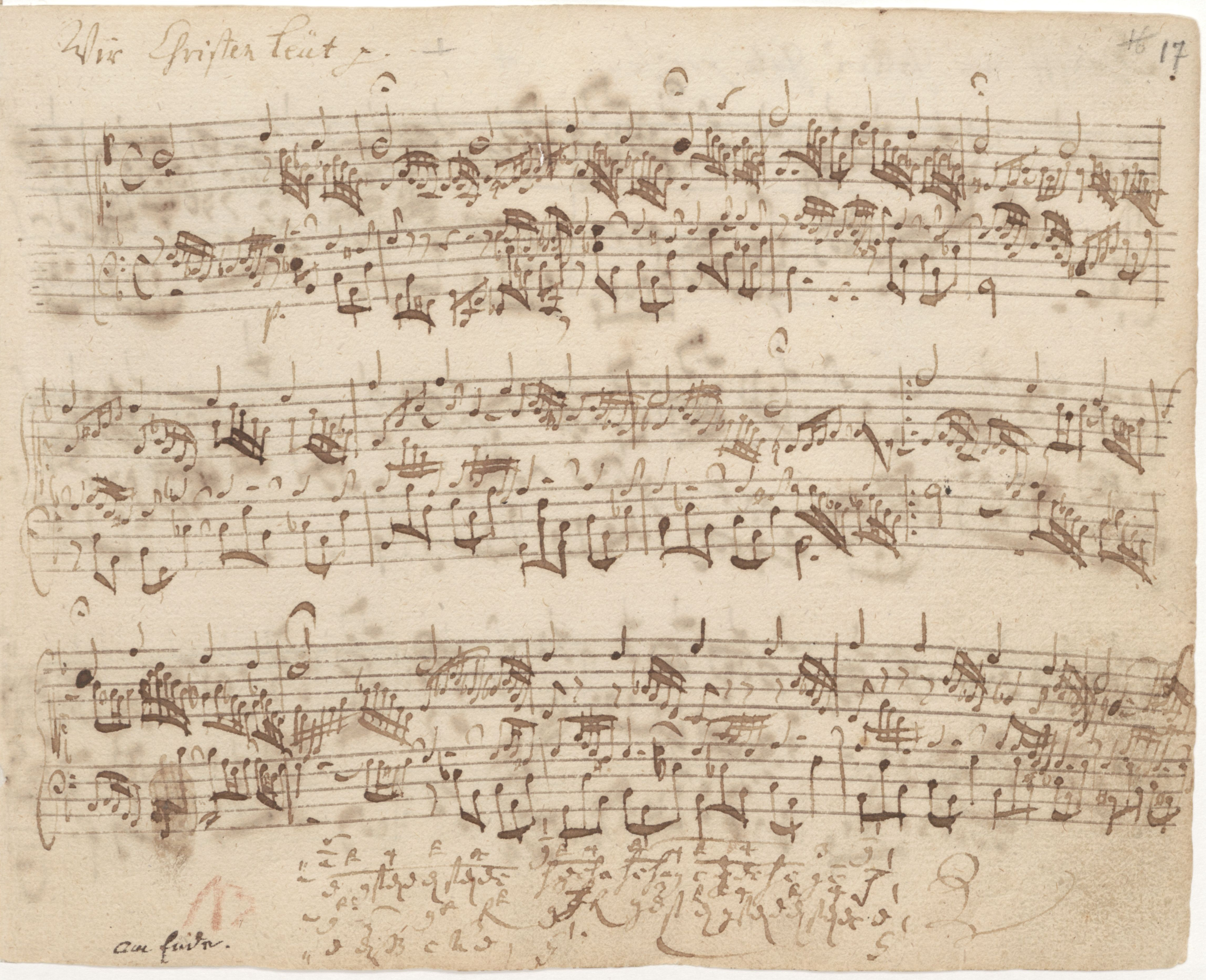
Autograph manuscript of BWV 612, with final bars entered at bottom of the page in organ tablature (also added on 2 clefs by unknown scribe at end of MS)

The hymn was previously set as the chorale prelude BWV 710 in the Kirnberger Collection; and it also appears as BWV 1090 in the Neumeister Collection. The autograph manuscript of Orgelbüchlein contains the original composing score for BWV 612. As with most of the collection, Bach had allotted one page for the chorale prelude. Due to lack of space, he entered the final two and a half bars in more compact tablature notation. The dots indicating the second half could be repeated—an unusual feature in Orgelbüchlein—first appeared in print in the 1983 Neue Bach-Gesellschaft edition of Heinz-Harald Löhlein.

BWV 612 is written for single manual and pedal with four voices. The plain cantus firmus is in the soprano part. The accompaniment—striding quavers in the pedal like an ostinato bass and dance-like semiquavers in the inner parts—s formed from two short motifs. Both motifs are related as can be seen when they are first heard together in the alto and bass parts in the last two beats of bar 1 and first beats of bar 2: separated by an octave plus a third, the bass motif (a rest followed by six notes) can be seen as a simplified form of the alto motif (a rest followed by two five-note figures). At the same time the motif in the inner parts is derived from descending scale D, C, B-flat, A that recurs in the cantus. Both accompanying motifs serve to propel the chorale prelude forwards, the bass line having a similar function to that in the last movement of the fourth Brandenburg concerto. Although the cantus itself repeats more of its lines than most Lutheran hymns, Bach avoids repetitiveness in the chorale prelude by varying the harmonies and rhythmic texture in the accompaniment for each phrase. In addition what sounds like an interlude for alto and tenor during a two and a half bar rest in the pedal part creates further variety.

The resolute striding bass has been seen by Schweitzer (1911b) as representing firmness in faith, a reference to the last two lines of the first verse Wer sich des tröst', und glaubet fest, soll nicht werden verloren: "whosoever trusts in Him and firmly believes shall not be lost." The same type of bass line was used much later by Bach in the chorale prelude Wir glauben all an einen Gott”, BWV 664 in Clavier-Übung III.

=== New Year BWV 613–615 ===
- BWV 613 Helft mir Gotts Güte preisen [Help me to praise God's goodness]

MIDI rendition

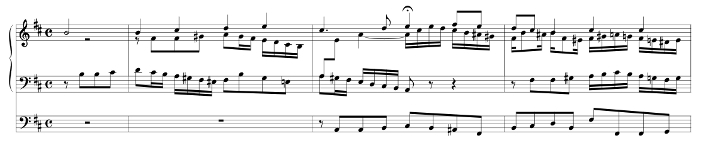

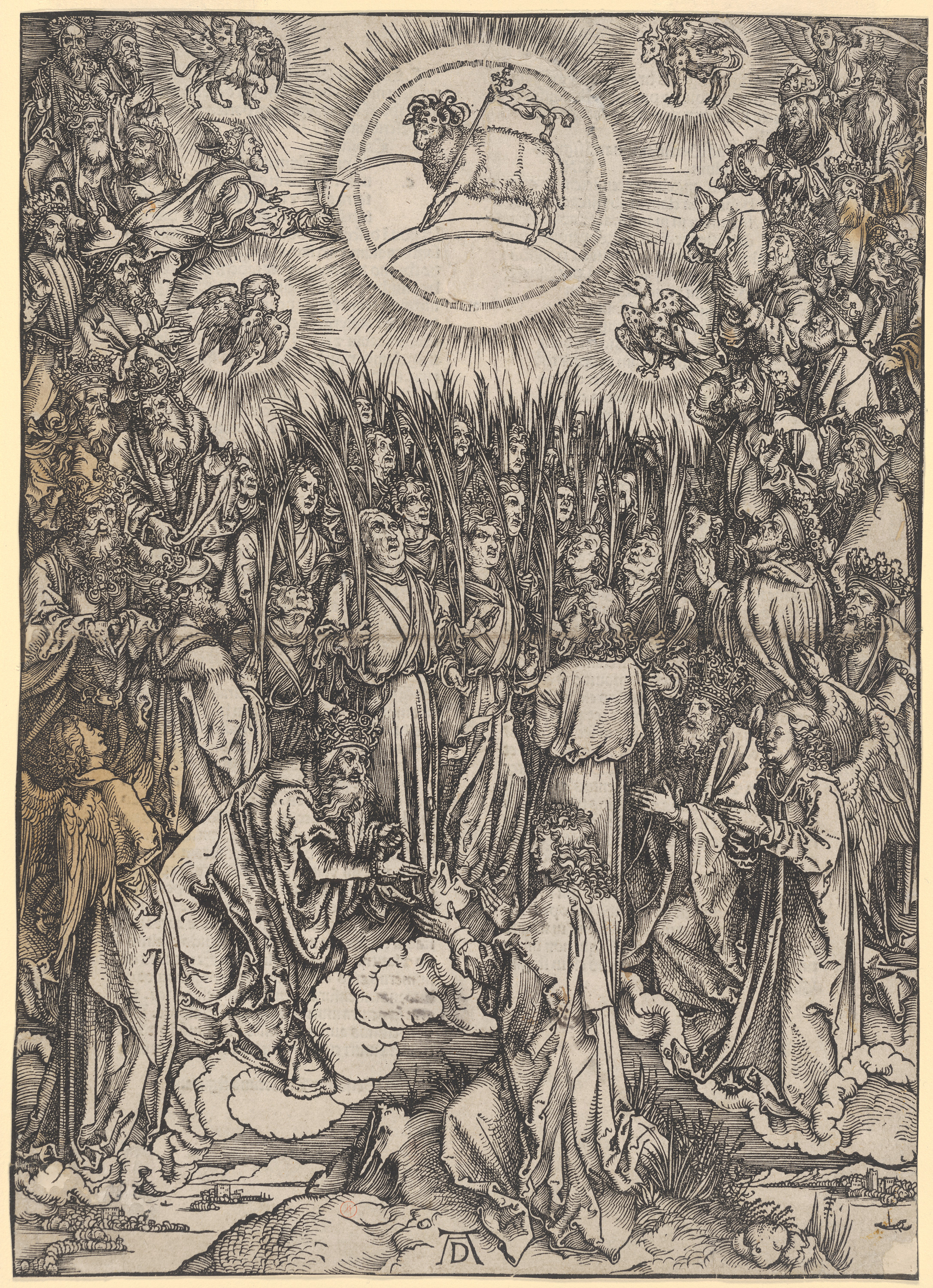
Hymn in adoration of the lamb from Dürer's Apocalypse

Below is the first verse of this New Year's hymn of Paul Eber with the English translation by John Christian Jacobi.

Helft mir Gott's Güte preisen, ihr lieben Kinderlein, mit G'sang und andrer Weisen ihm allzeit dankbar sein, vornehmlich zu der Zeit, da sich das Jahr tut enden, die Sonn' sich zu uns wenden, das Neujahr ist nicht weit.	Come, let us All, with Fervour, On whom Heaven's Mercies shine, To our Supreme Preserver In tuneful Praises join. Another Year is gone; Of which the tender Mercies (Each pious Heart rehearses) Demand a grateful Song.

- BWV 614 Das alte Jahr vergangen ist [The old year has passed] a 2 Clav. et Ped.

MIDI rendition

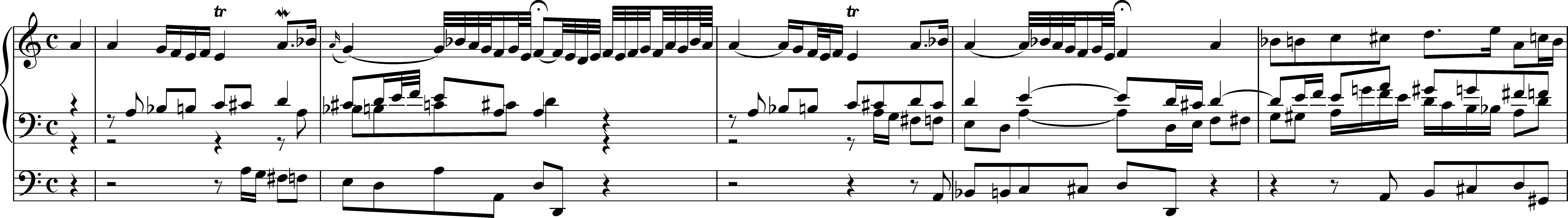

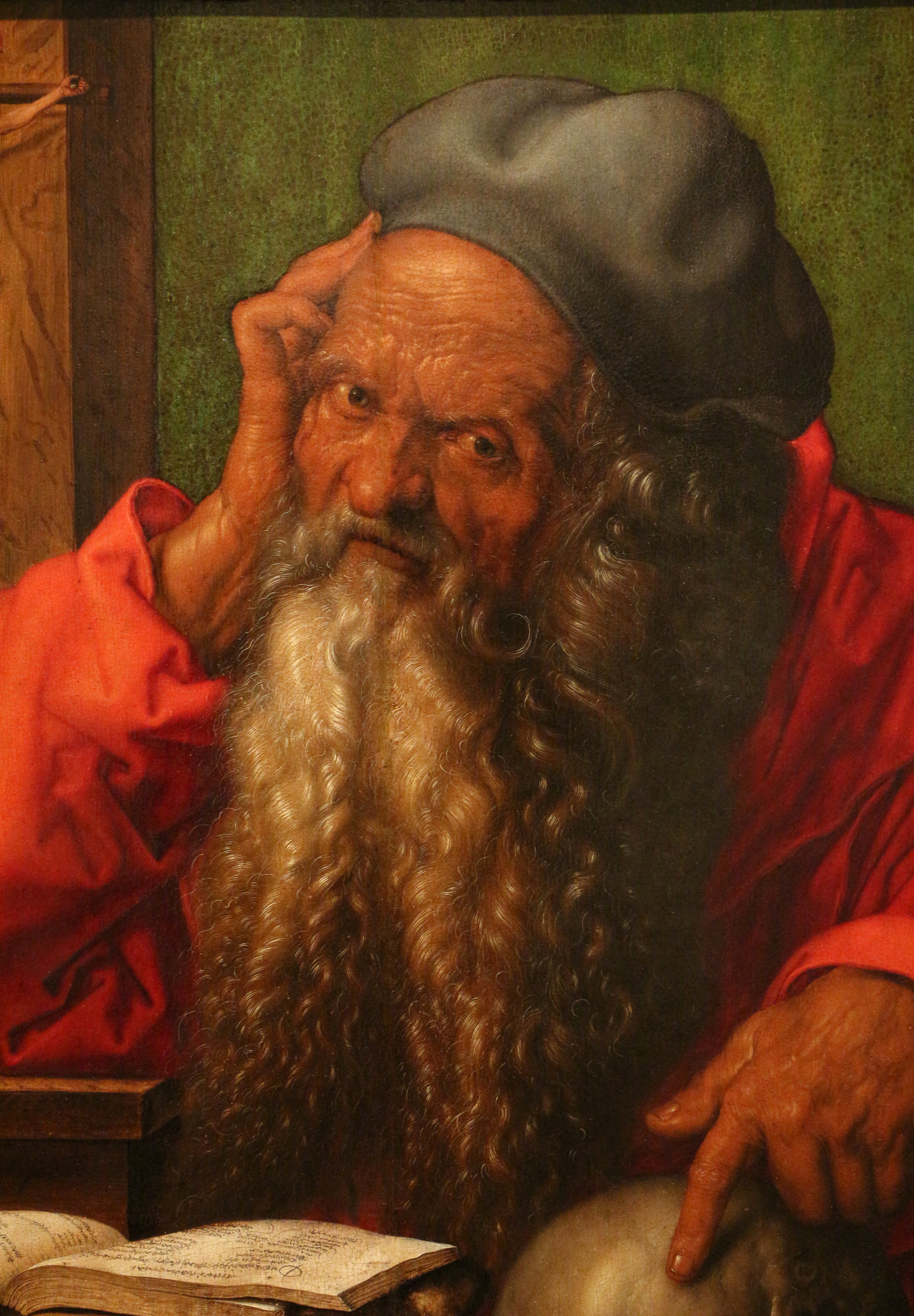
Albrecht Dürer, St Jerome

Below are the six verses of this New Year's hymn with the English translation of Catherine Winkworth.

Das alte Jahr vergangen ist, wir danken dir, Herr Jesu Christ, daß du uns hast in aller G'fahr so gnädiglich behüt't dies Jahr. Wir bitten dich, ewigen Sohn Des Vaters in dem höchsten Thron, Du woll'st dein' arme Christenheit Ferner bewahren allezeit. Entzeuch uns nicht dein heilsam Wort, welch's ist der Seelen Trost und Hort, vor's Papsts Lehr' und Abgötterei bewahr uns, Herr, und steh uns bei! Hilf, daß wir von der Sand' ablan Und fromm zu werden fahen an. Kein'r Sünd' im alten Jahr gedenk, Ein gnadenreich neu Jahr uns schenk. Christlich zu leben, seliglich Zu sterben und hernach fröhlich Am Jüngsten Tag wied'r aufzustehn, Mit dir in Himmel einzugehn, Zu danken und zu loben dich Mit allen Engeln ewiglich. O Jesu, unsern Glauben mehr Zu deines Namens Lob und Ehr'!	The old year now hath passed away, We thank Thee, O our God, today That Thou hast kept us through the year, When danger and distress were near. We pray Thee, O Eternal Son, Who with the Father reign'st as One, To guard and rule Thy Christendom Through all the ages yet to come. Take not Thy saving Word away. Our souls' true comfort and their stay; Abide with us, and keep us free From errors, following only Thee. O help us to forsake all sin, A new and holier course begin, Mark not what once was done amiss; A happier, better year be this, Wherein as Christians we may live, Or die in peace that Thou canst give, To rise again when Thou shalt come, And enter Thine eternal home. There shall we thank Thee, and adore, With all the angels evermore; Lord Jesus Christ, increase our faith To praise Thy name through life and death.

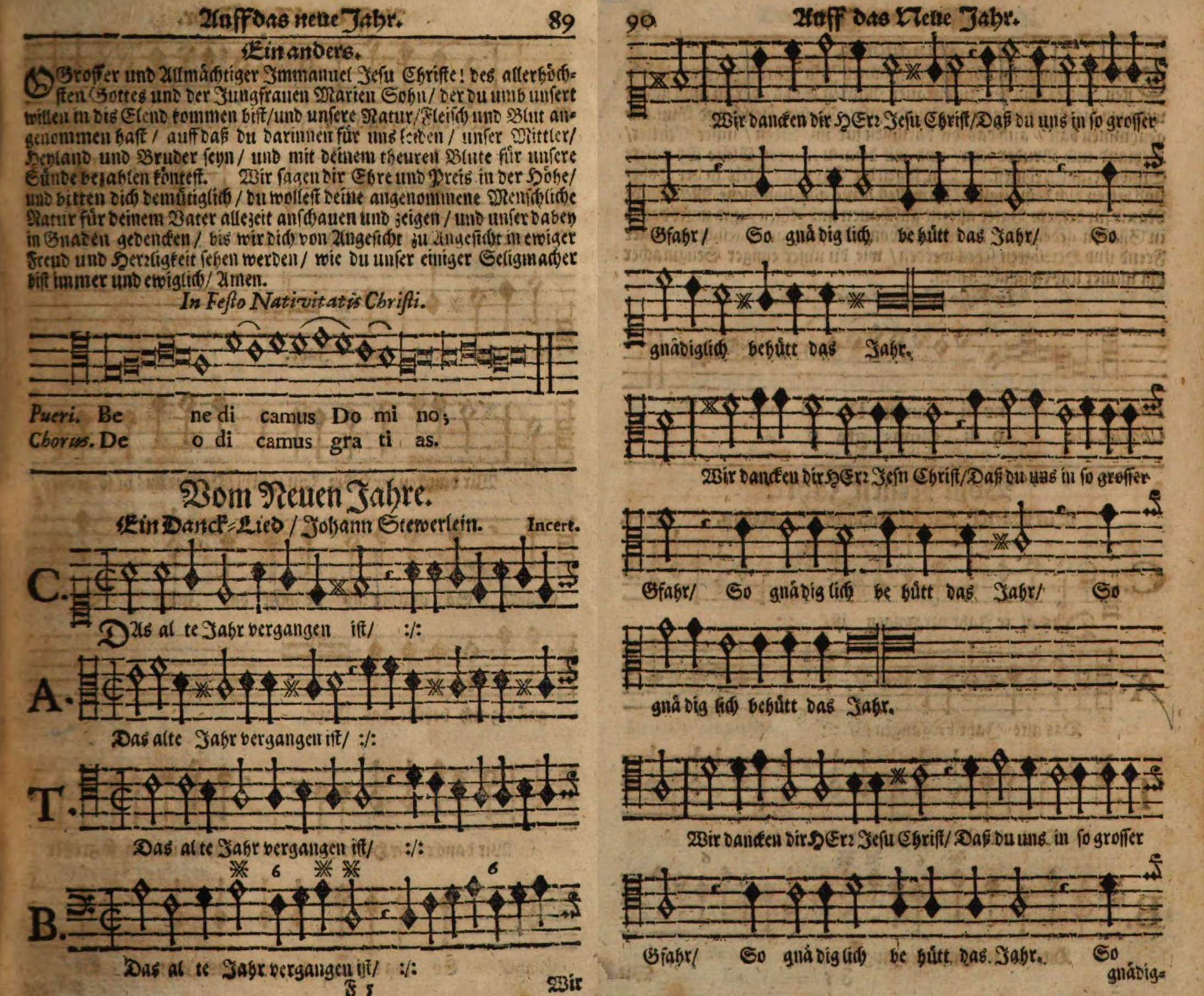
Das alte Jahr vergangen ist in the Neu Leipziger Gesangbuch of Gottfried Vopelius, 1682. The hymn tune is on the first line of the first page and the first three lines of the second.

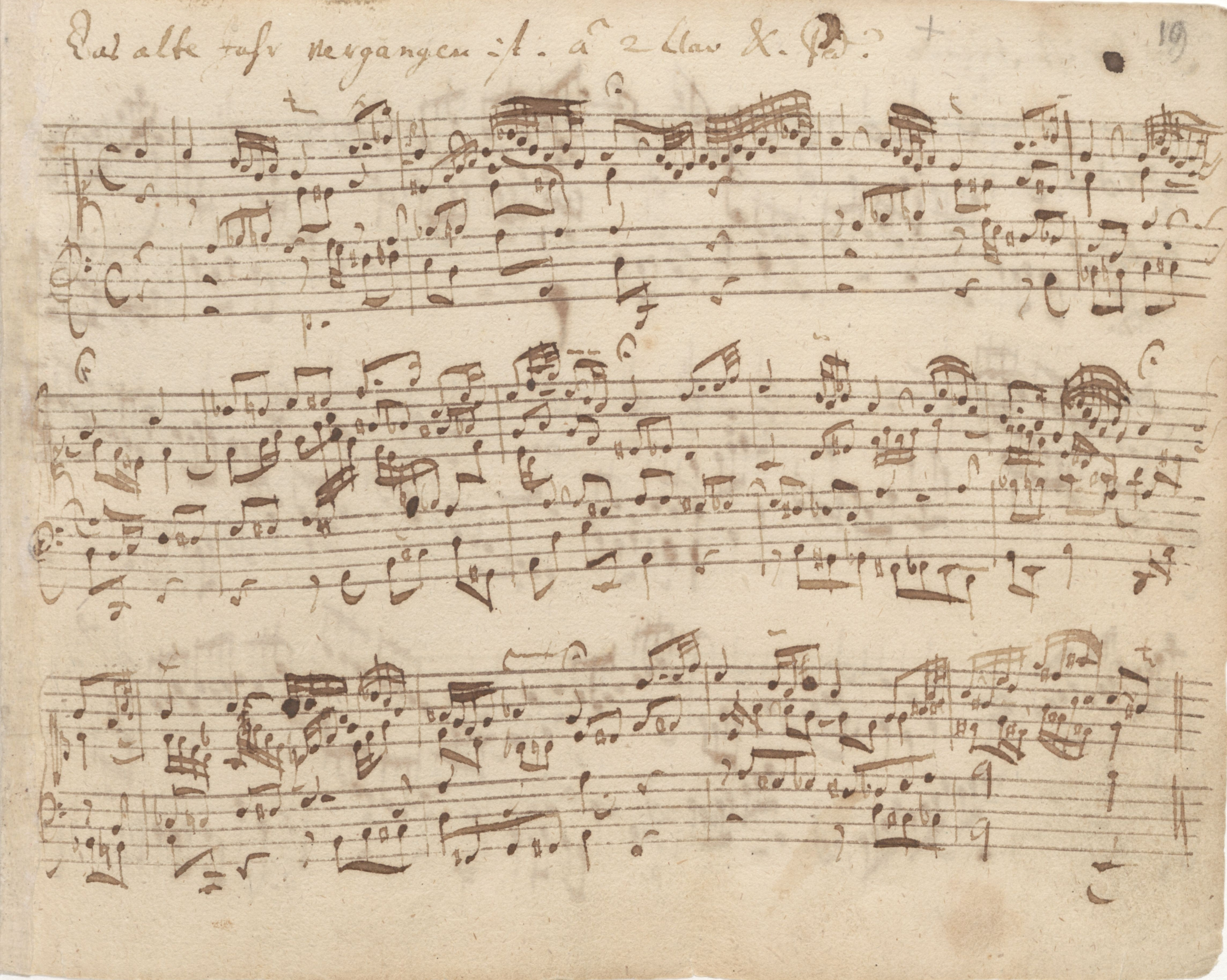
Autograph manuscript of Das alte Jahre vergangen ist, BWV 614

Customarily sung on New Year's Day, the hymn addresses thanks for the past year and prayers for the coming year to Christ. Although primarily a supplication looking forwards to the future, the hymn also looks back at the past, reflecting on the perils facing man, his sins and his transitory existence.

The version of the hymn that Bach used for BWV 614 only emerged gradually. The first two verses of the hymn text were first published in Clemens Stephani's Nuremberg hymnbook of 1568; the entire six verses of the text appeared in Johann Steuerlein's Erfurt hymnbook of 1588. An early version of the melody also appeared in Steuerlein's hymnbook, but set to different words (Gott Vater, der du deine Sonn). That melody first appeared with the text in Erhard Bodenschatz's Leipzig hymnbook of 1608. One of the earliest known sources for the version of the hymn used by Bach is Gottfried Vopelius's Leipzig hymnbook of 1682. Prior to modern scientific methods for dating Bach's autograph manuscripts, scholars had relied on identifying hymnbooks available to him to determine exactly when Orgelbüchlein was written. Terry (1921) erroneously assigned a date after 1715, because the earliest source for Das alte Jahr he had been able to locate was Christian Friedrich Witt's Gotha hymnbook, first published in 1715. As is now known, Bach set Das alte Jahr early in his career as BWV 1091, one of the chorale preludes in the Neumeister Collection; he also composed two four-part harmonisations, BWV 288 and 289.

The chorale prelude BWV 614 is written for two manuals and pedal with the cantus firmus in the soprano voice. Despite starting starkly with two repeated crotchets—unaccompanied and unembellished—in the cantus, BWV 614 is an ornamental chorale prelude: the highly expressive melodic line, although restrained, includes elaborate ornamentation, coloratura melismas (reminiscent of Bach's Arnstadt chorale preludes) and "sighing" falling notes, which at the close completely subsume the melody as they rise and fall in the final cadence. The accompaniment is built from the motif of a rising chromatic fourth heard first in the response to the first two notes of the cantus. The motif is in turn linked to the melodic line, which later on in bar 5 is decorated with a rising chromatic fourth. Bach ingeniously develops the accompaniment using the motif in canon, inversion and semiquaver stretto. The three lower voices respond to each other and to the melodic line, with the soprano and alto voices sighing in parallel sixths at the close. The chromatic fourth was a common form of the baroque passus duriusculus, mentioned in the seventeenth century musical treatise of Christoph Bernhard, a student of Heinrich Schütz. The chromaticism creates ambiguities of key throughout the chorale prelude. The original hymn melody is in the aeolian mode of A (the natural form of A minor) modulating to E major in the final cadence. Renwick (2006) analyses the mysteries of the key structure in BWV 614. In addition to giving a detailed Schenkerian analysis, he notes that the cadences pass between D minor and A until the final cadence to E major; that the modal structure moves between the Dorian mode on D and the Phrygian mode on E through the intermediary of their common reciting note A; and that the key changes are mediated by the chromatic fourths in the accompaniment.

Since the nineteenth century successive commentators have found the mood of the chorale prelude to be predominantly sad, despite that not being in keeping with the hymn text. The chromatic fourth has been interpreted as a "grief motif". It has been described as "melancholic" by Schweitzer (1905); as having "the greatest intensity" by Spitta (1899); as a "prayer" with "anxiety for the future" by Ernst Arfken; and as a crossroads between "the past and the future" by Jacques Chailley. Williams (2003) suggests that the grieving mood might possibly reflect tragic events in Bach's life at the time of composition; indeed in 1713 his first wife gave birth to twins who died within a month of being born. Renwick (2006) takes a different approach, suggesting that Bach's choice of tonal structure leads the listener to expect the E's that end the chorale prelude to be answered by A's, the notes that start it. To Renwick such "cyclicity" reflects the themes of the hymn: "a turning point; a Janus-like reflection backward and forward; regret for the past and hope for the future; the place between before and after."

- BWV 615 In dir ist Freude [In you is joy]

MIDI rendition

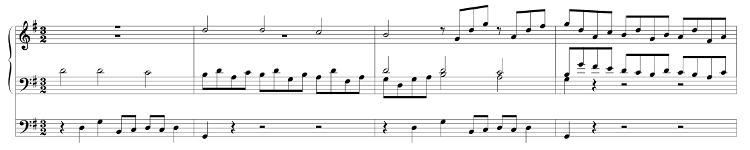

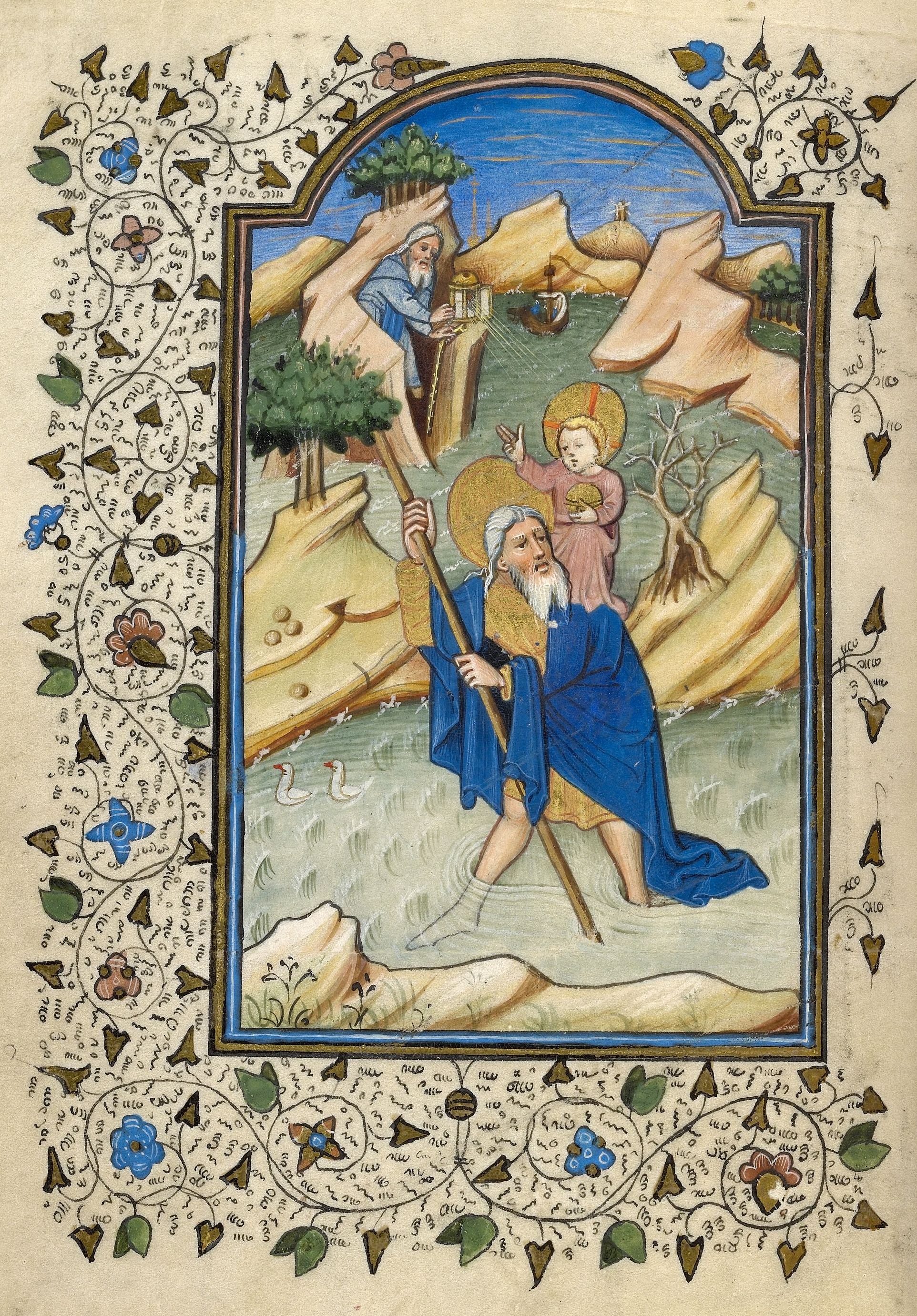
St Christopher with the Christ Child, early 15th-century Book of Hours, Ghent

Below is the first verse of the hymn In dir ist Freude with the English translation by Catherine Winkworth.

In dir ist Freude in allem Leide, o du süßer Jesu Christ! Durch dich wir haben himmlische Gaben, du der wahre Heiland bist; hilfest von Schanden, rettest von Banden. Wer dir vertrauet, hat wohl gebauet, wird ewig bleiben. Halleluja. Zu deiner Güte steht unser G'müte, an dir wir kleben im Tod und Leben; nichts kann uns scheiden. Halleluja.	In Thee is gladness Amid all sadness, Jesus, Sunshine of my heart! By Thee are given The gifts of heaven, Thou the true Redeemer art! Our souls Thou wakest, Our bonds Thou breakest, Who trusts Thee surely Hath built securely, He stands for ever: Hallelujah! Our hearts are pining To see Thy shining, Dying or living To Thee are cleaving, Nought can us sever: Hallelujah!

The church musician Johann Lindemann published the text in 1598 which was set to Giovanni Giacomo Gastoldi's melody written in 1591.

=== Candlemas BWV 616–617 ===
- BWV 616 Mit Fried' und Freud' ich fahr' dahin [With peace and joy I depart]

MIDI rendition

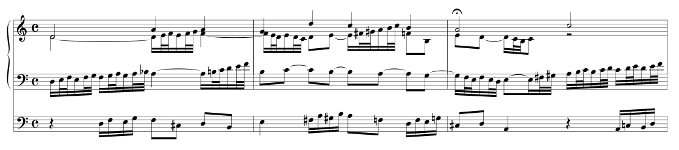

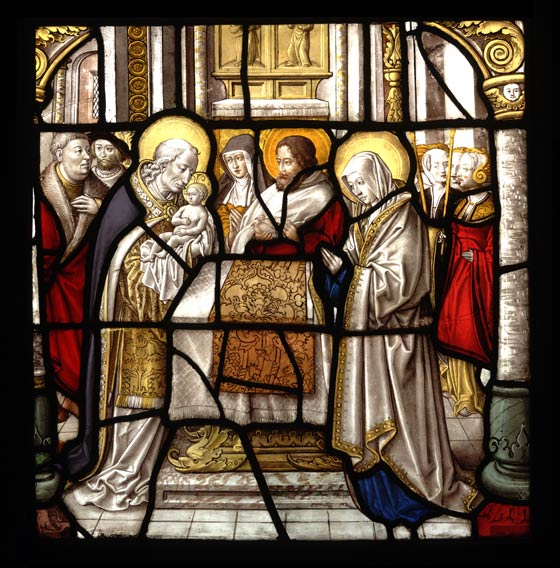
Feast of the Purification, early 16th-century stained glass from Mariawald Abbey near Cologne

Below is the first verse of Martin Luther's version of the Nunc dimittis, Mit Fried und Freud ich fahr dahin, a text associated with the Epiphany-tide feast of the Presentation in the Temple, together with an English translation by Catherine Winkworth.

Mit Fried und Freud ich fahr dahin in Gottes Willen; getrost ist mir mein Herz und Sinn, sanft und stille, wie Gott mir verheißen hat: er Tod ist mein Schlaf worden.	In peace and joy I now depart, According to God's will, For full of comfort is my heart, So calm and sweet and still; So doth God His promise keep, And death to me is but a sleep.

- BWV 617 Herr Gott, nun schleuß den Himmel auf [Lord God, now unlock Heaven]

MIDI rendition

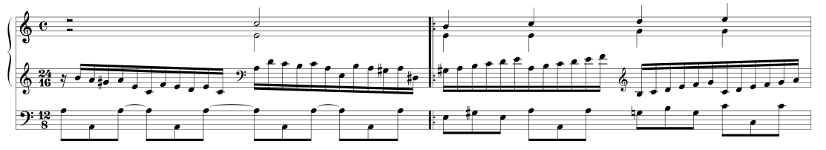

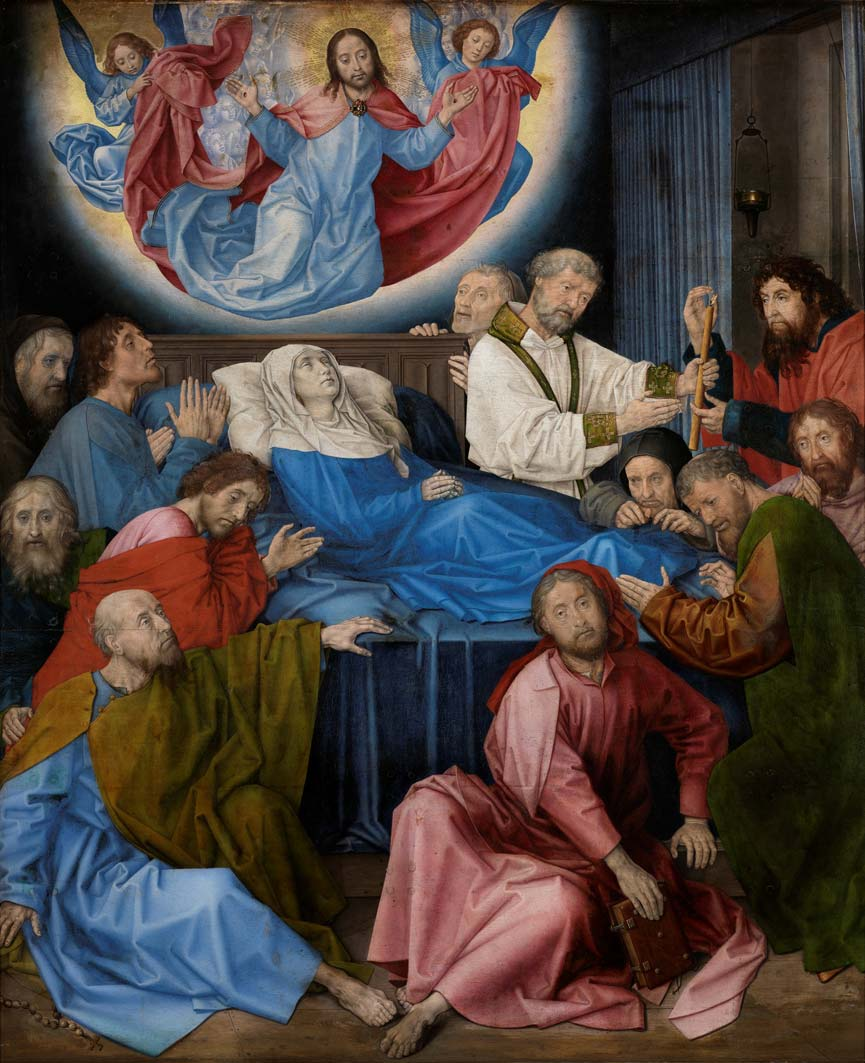
Hugo van der Goes, Death of the Virgin

Below are the first and last verses of Tobias Kiel's hymn which references the Song of Simeon, a biblical text associated with the Epiphany-tide feast of the Presentation in the Temple. The English translation is by Catherine Winkworth.

Herr Gott, nun schleuss den Himmel auf! mein Zeit zu End sich neiget, ich hab vollendet meinen Lauf, des sich mein Seel freuet; hab g'nug gelitten, mich müd gestritten, schick mich fein zu zur ewig'n Ruh laß fahren, was auf Erden will lieber selig werden. ∘∘∘ Laß mich nur, Herr, wie Simeon im Friede zu dir fahren. Befiehl mich Christo, deinem Sohn der wir mich wohl bewahren; wird mich recht führen im Himmel zieren mit Ehr und Kron; fahr drauf davon; laß fahren, was auf Erden will lieber selig werden.	Lord God, now open wide Thy heaven, My parting hour is near; My course is run, enough I've striven, Enough I've suffered here; Weary and sad My heart is glad That she may lay her down to rest; Now all on earth I can resign. But only let Thy heaven be mine. ∘∘∘ Then let me go like Simeon In peace with Thee to dwell. For I commend me to Thy Son, And He will guard me well, And guide me straight To the golden gate: And in this hope I calmly die; Yes, all on earth I can resign. If but Thy heaven may now be mine.

=== Lent BWV 618–624 ===
- BWV 618 O Lamm Gottes, unschuldig [Oh innocent Lamb of God] Canon alla Quinta

MIDI rendition

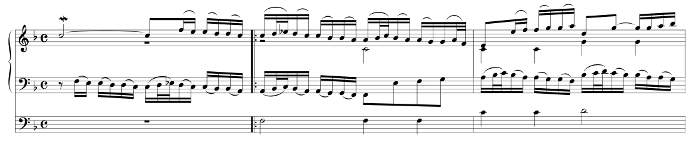

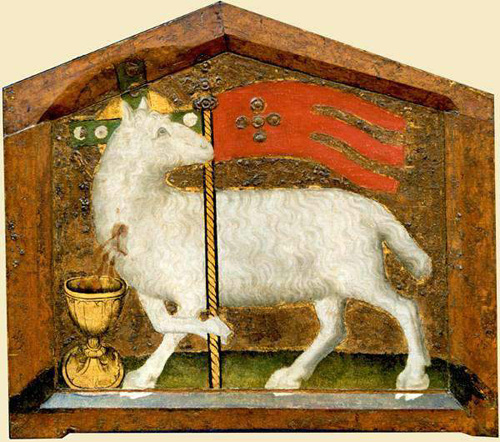
Lamb of God, 14th-century altar painting from Prague

Below is the first verse and refrain of the third verse of this version of the Agnus Dei, O Lamm Gottes, unschuldig, with the English translation of Catherine Winkworth.

O Lamm Gottes, unschuldig am Stamm des Kreuzes geschlachtet, allzeit funden geduldig, wiewohl du warest verachtet; all Sünd hast du getragen, sonst müßten wir verzagen. Erbarm dich unser, O Jesu. ∘∘∘ Gieb uns dein Frieden, o Jesu.	O Lamb of God, most stainless! Who on the Cross didst languish, Patient through all Thy sorrows. Though mocked amid Thine anguish; Our sins Thou bearest for us, Else had despair reigned o'er us: Have mercy upon us, O Jesu! ∘∘∘ Grant us Thy peace today, O Jesu!

- BWV 619 Christe, du Lamm Gottes [Christ, Lamb of God] in Canone alla Duodecime, a 2 Clav. et Ped.

MIDI rendition

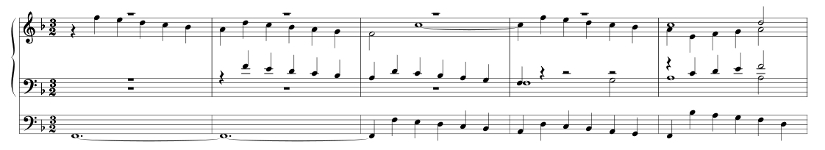

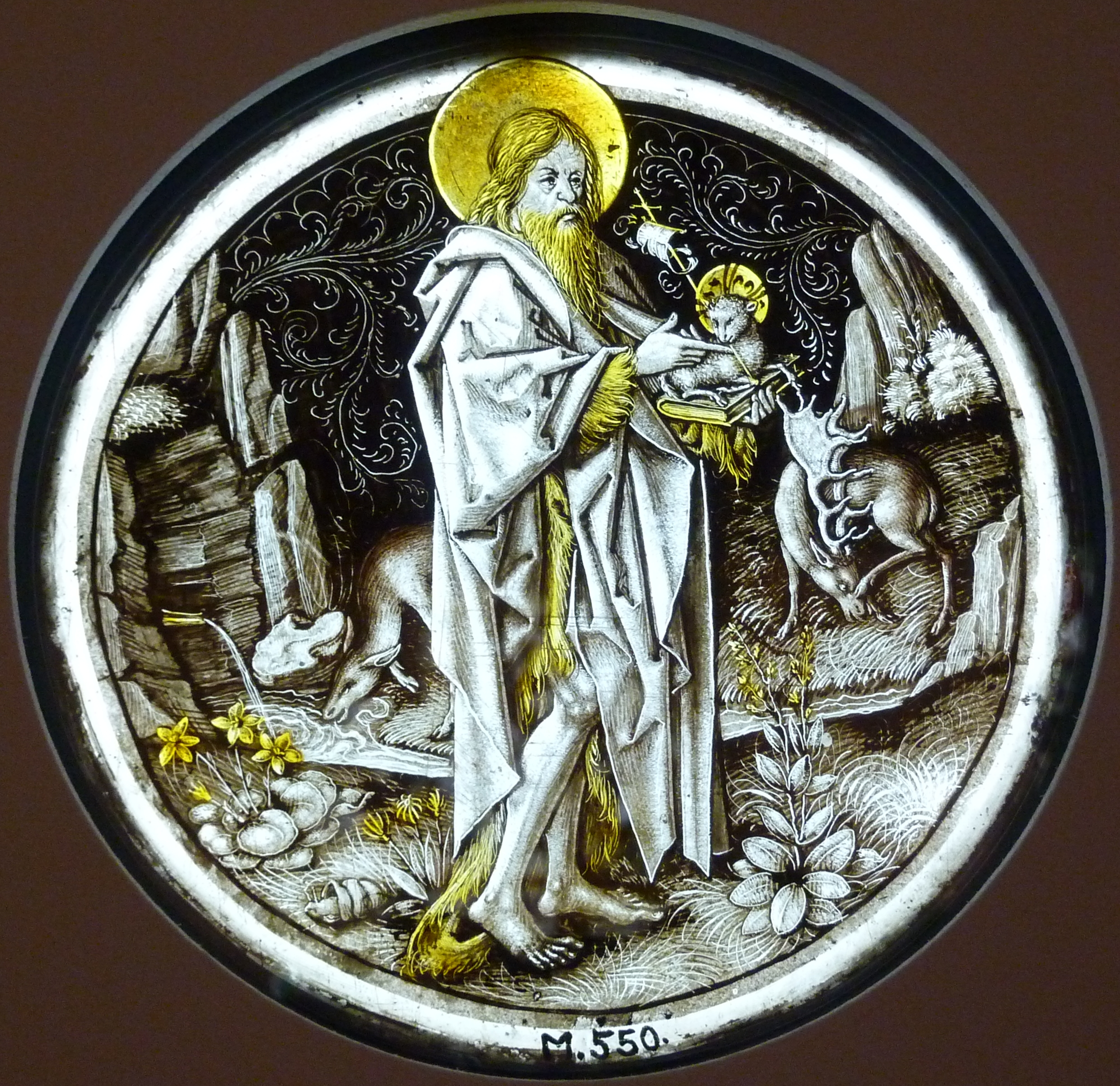
St John the Baptist with the Lamb of God, late 15th-century German stained glass roundel

Below is the first verse and refrain of the third verse of Christe, du Lamm Gottes, a German version of the Agnus Dei, with the English translation of Charles Sanford Terry.

Christe, du Lamm Gottes, der du trägst die Sünd' der Welt, erbarm dich unser! ∘∘∘ gib uns dein'n Frieden!	Christ, Thou Lamb of God, Thou that bear'st the sins of men, Have mercy on us! ∘∘∘ Grant to us Thy peace!

- BWV 620 Christus, der uns selig macht [Christ, who makes us blessed] in Canone all'Ottava

MIDI rendition

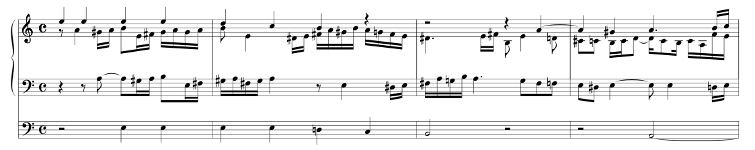

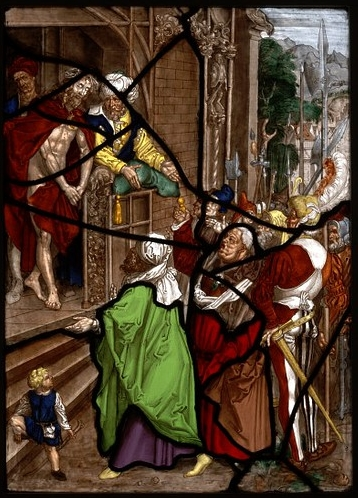
Ecce Homo, mid-16th-century stained glass panel from Germany

This setting of the Lutheran hymn Christus, der uns selig macht features the chorale in canon between the highest voice in the manuals and the pedal part. The original manuscript features passages in tablature notation, which has led to inaccurate readings in some published editions.

Below is the text of the first and last verse of the Passiontide hymn with the English translation of John Christian Jacobi.

Christus, der uns selig macht, kein Bös hat gegangen, war für uns zur Mitternacht als ein dieb gefangen, geführt vor Gottlose Leut und fälschlich verklaget, verlacht, verhöhnt under verspeit, wie den Schrift saget. ••• O hilf, Christe, Gottes Sohn, durch dein bitter Leiden, daß wir dir stets untertan Sünd und Unrecht meiden, deinen Tod und sein Ursach fruchtbar nun bedenken, dafür, wiewohl arm und schwach, dir Dankopfer schenken.	Christ, by Whose all-saving Light Mankind benefited, Was for Sinners in the Night As a Thief committed. Dragged before a wicked Court Of the Jewish Clergy; Where they tried their worst Effort 'Gainst the Lord of Mercy. ••• Grant, O Jesu, blessed Lord, By Thy Cross and Passion, Thy blest Love may be adored By the whole Creation: Hating Sin, the woful Cause Of Thy Death and Suffering, Give our Heart to obey Thy Laws As the best Thanks-offering.

- BWV 621 Da Jesus an dem Kreuze stund [As Jesus hung upon the Cross]

BWV 621

MIDI rendition

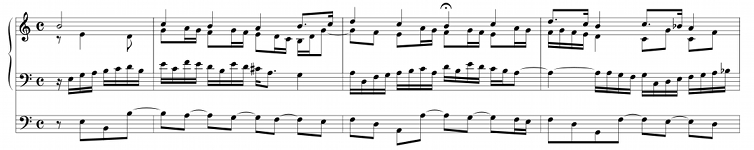

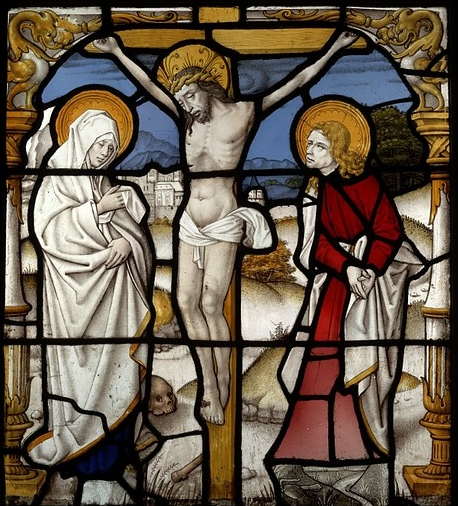
The Crucifixion, early 16th-century stained glass

Below is the text by Johann Böschenstein (1472–1540) of the first and last verses of this Passiontide hymn Da Jesus an dem Kreuze stund with the English translation from the Moravian Hymn Book (1746). Usually sung on Good Friday, the hymn has as its theme the Seven Last Words from the Cross, each of the seven intervening verses meditating on a different Word.

Da Jesus an dem Kreuze stund und ihm sein Leib war ganz verwund't mit bitterlichen Schmerzen, die sieben Wort, die er da sprach, betracht in deinem Herzen. ∘∘∘ Wer Gottes Mart'r in Ehren hat, und oft gedenckt der sieben Wort, des will Gott eben pflegen, wohl hier auf Erd'n mit seinem Gnad, und dort im ewigen Leben.	When Jesus on the Cross was found, His Body pierced with many a Wound, With Torture very bitter; The dying Words, which He then spake, With a still Heart consider. ∘∘∘ He who God's Pains in Honour has, To whom our Saviour gives the Grace To be in Heart possessing And weigh these seven Gospel Words, Enjoys a noble Blessing.

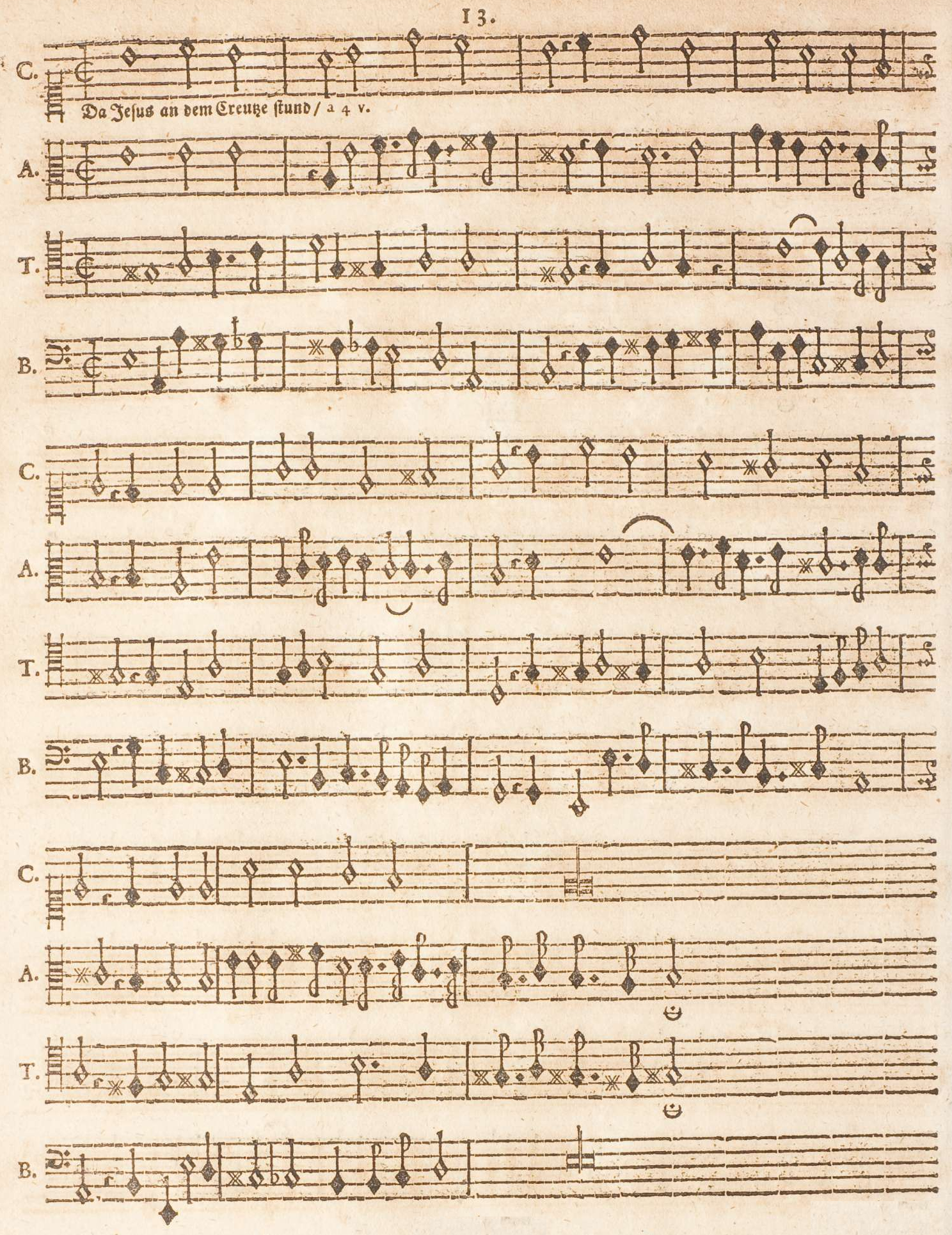
Hymn in the 1650 Görlitzer Tabulaturbuch of Samuel Scheidt with cantus in soprano clef

The hymn melody is in the phrygian mode and dates back to the Reformation. In the generation prior to Bach, organ settings had mainly been made by composers in Southern Germany like Kindermann, Pachelbel and Fischer.

Unlike most of the other chorale preludes in the Orgelbüchlein, Bach did not use the chorale in any of his cantatas—BWV 621 is his unique setting of the hymn. BWV 621 is scored for single manual and pedal, with the cantus firmus in the soprano voice almost entirely in plain crotchets. The accompaniment below the cantus creates an unusually dense texture. There are three accompanying voices, often closely scored: the alto and tenor voices in the keyboard between them weave a continuous and complex pattern of rising and falling semiquavers, sometimes in parallel thirds; and below them the bass voice in the pedal moves in steady quavers and syncopated crotchets.

The accompaniment in each lower voice is constructed from its own separate motifs, each having its own characteristic rhythm. Although the longer figures in the two lowest voices are heard several times throughout the piece, Bach's ingenious writing gives no sense of artifice or mechanical repetition. In addition, as Williams (2003) notes, the outer and inner voices are naturally paired: the pedal with—or in opposition to—the cantus; and the alto voice with the tenor. The pedal starts off with a cross motif in quavers, which recurs throughout the composition. The cross motifs are followed by suspended crochets, falling in steps. These create constant dissonances with the cantus which are resolved only by the cadence at the close. The syncopated crotchets in the pedal also interrupt the fermatas at the end of each cantus line, giving a further sense of restlessness. The alto part is characterised by falling anapaests; while the tenor line is made up of two parts, the first a rising semiquaver figure and the second shorter semiquaver cross motifs descending in sequence. As the piece progresses the motifs become more concentrated, with the alto taking up some of the tenor motifs towards the close. These novel features mark a departure from the more standard settings of the hymn by Bach's predecessors such as Fischer which conform more closely to the stile antico.

Many commentators have interpreted the compositional form and motifs of BWV 621 in terms of the themes of the Passiontide hymn, primarily concerned with the crucifixion. Spitta (1899) wrote that Christ's hanging on the cross "is represented by the heavy, syncopated notes" and takes this as "evidence of a wonderfully true aesthetic feeling" [in Bach], since "that enforced quietude of direst anguish was no real calm." Similarly for Schweitzer (1911b), the pedal line symbolises "the drooping of the exhausted body of Jesus on the cross." Stinson (1999) describes the dissonant suspensions as fitting for "the tragic subject matter". For Williams (2003) the syncopated bass line is a "masterful" way of evoking the dragging of the cross. Similar motifs and handling of voices occur at the close of Von Himmel hoch, da komm ich her, BWV 606: although that Christmas hymn primarily concerns the incarnation of Christ, later parts of the text foreshadow the crucifixion.

- BWV 622 O Mensch, bewein dein Sünde groß [Oh Man, bewail your great sins] a 2 Clav. et Ped.

MIDI rendition

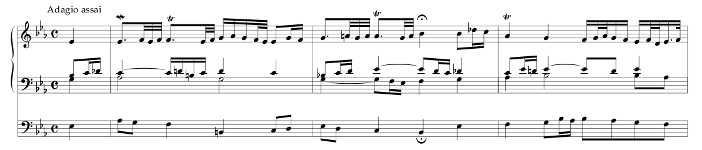

Below is the text of the first stanza of the hymn O Mensch, bewein dein Sünde groß by Sebald Heyden with the English translation of Catherine Winkworth.

O Mensch, bewein dein Sünde gross, darum Christus seins Vaters Schoss verliess und kam auf Erden. Von einer Jungfrau rein und zart für uns er hier geboren war: er wollt der Mittler werden. Den Toten er das Leben gab, und legt dabei all Krankheit ab! Bis sich die Zeit herdrange daß er für uns geopfert würd trug unser Sünd ein schwere Bürd wohl an dem Kreuze lange.	O man, thy grievous sin bemoan, For which Christ left His Father's throne, From highest heaven descending. Of Virgin pure and undefiled He here was born, our Saviour mild, For sin to make atonement. The dead He raised to life again. The sick He freed from grief and pain. Until the time appointed That He for us should give His Blood, Should bear our sins' o'erwhelming load, The shameful Cross enduring.

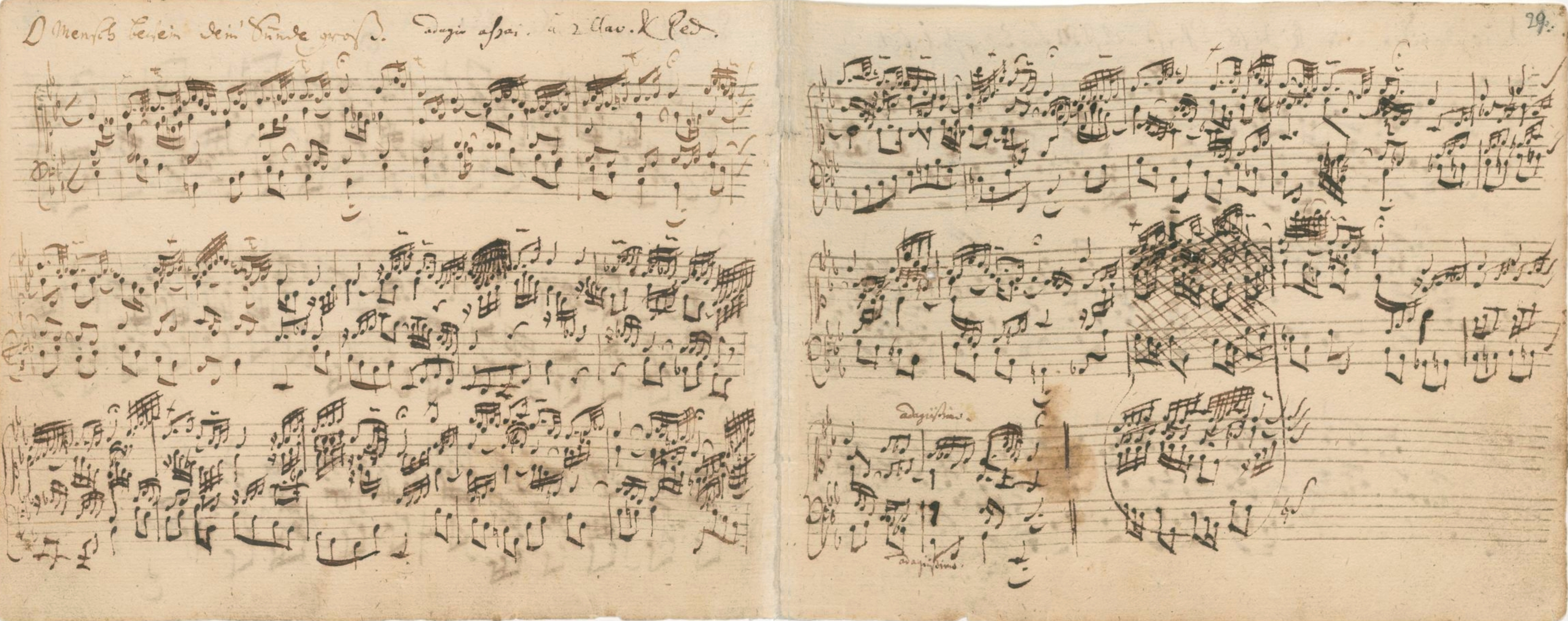
Autograph score of BWV 622, O Mensch, bewein dein Sünde groß

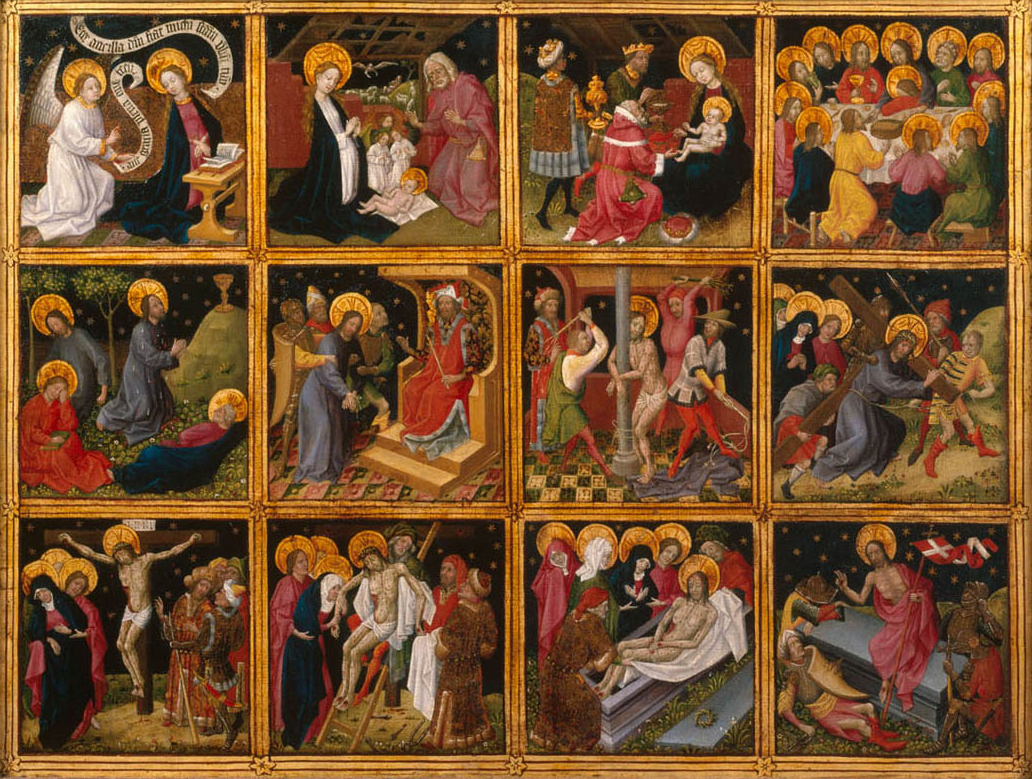
Twelve scenes from the life of Christ, 15th-century painting from Cologne

"O Mensch" is one of the most celebrated of Bach's chorale preludes. The cantus firmus, composed in 1525 by Matthias Greitter and associated with Whitsuntide, was also later used with the same words for the closing chorale of the first part of the St Matthew Passion, taken from the 1725 version of the St John Passion. Bach ornamented the simple melody, in twelve phrases reflecting the twelve lines of the opening verse, with an elaborate coloratura. It recalls but also goes beyond the ornamental chorale preludes of Buxtehude. The ornamentation, although employing conventional musical figures, is highly original and inventive. While the melody in the upper voice is hidden by coloratura over a wide range, the two inner voices are simple and imitative above the continuo-style bass. Bach varies the texture and colouring of the accompaniment for each line of what is one of the longest melodies in the collection.

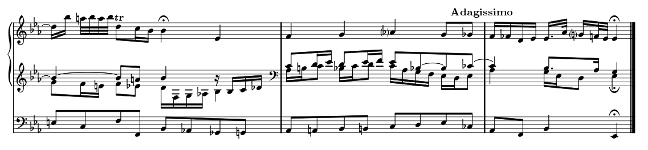

In the penultimate line, accompanying the words "ein schwere Bürd" (a heavy burden), the inner parts intensify moving in semiquavers (16th notes) with the upper voice to a climax on the highest note in the prelude. The closing phrase, with its mounting chromatic bass accompanying bare unadorned crotchets (quarter notes) in the melody to end in an unexpected modulation to C♭ major, recall but again go beyond earlier compositions of Pachelbel, Frohberger and Buxtehude. It has been taken by some commentators as a musical allusion to the words kreuze lange in the text: for Spitta the passage was "full of imagination and powerful feeling". As Williams (2003) comments, however, the inner voices, "with their astonishing accented passing-notes transcend images, as does the sudden simplicity of the melody when the bass twice rises chromatically."

- BWV 623 Wir danken dir, Herr Jesu Christ [We give thanks to you, Lord Jesus Christ]

MIDI rendition

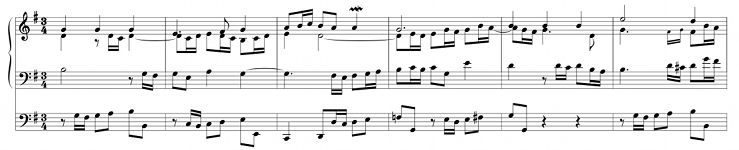

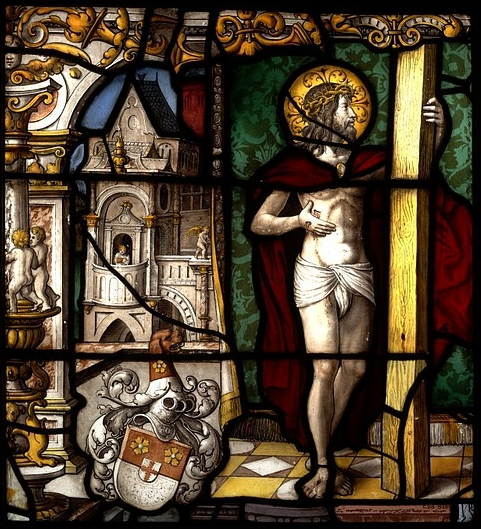
Man of Sorrows, early 16th-century stained glass from Steinfeld Abbey

Below is the German text of the 1568 Lutheran hymn by the Bohemian theologian Christoph Fischer, with the English translation of Benjamin Hall Kennedy.

Wir danken dir, Herr Jesu Christ, daß du für uns gestorben bist und hast uns durch dein teures Blut gemacht vor Gott gerecht und gut, ∘∘∘ Und bitten dich, wahr'r Mensch und Gott, durch dein' heilig' fünf Wunden rot, erlös' uns von dem ew'gen Tod und tröst uns in der letzten Not! ∘∘∘ Nehüt uns auch vor Sünd' und Schand', reich uns dein' allmächtige Hand, daß wir im Kreuz geduldig sei'n uns trösten deiner schweren Pein ∘∘∘ Und draus schöpfen die Zuversicht, daß du uns werd'st verlaßen nicht, sondern ganz treulich bei uns stehn, bis wir durchs Kreuz ins Leben gehn.	We bless Thee, Jesus Christ our Lord; For ever be Thy name adored: For Thou, the sinless One, hast died That sinners might be justified. ∘∘ O very Man, and very God, Redeem us with Thy precious blood; From death eternal set us free, And make us one with God in Thee. ∘∘ From sin and shame defend us still. And work in us Thy stedfast will, The Cross with patience to sustain, And bravely bear its utmost pain. ∘∘ In Thee we trust, in Thee alone; For Thou forsakest not Thine own: To all the meek Thy strength is given, Who by Thy Cross ascend to heaven.

- BWV 624 Hilf, Gott, daß mir's gelinge [Help me, God, that I may succeed] a 2 Clav. et Ped.

MIDI rendition

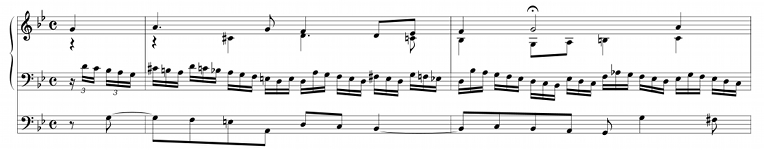

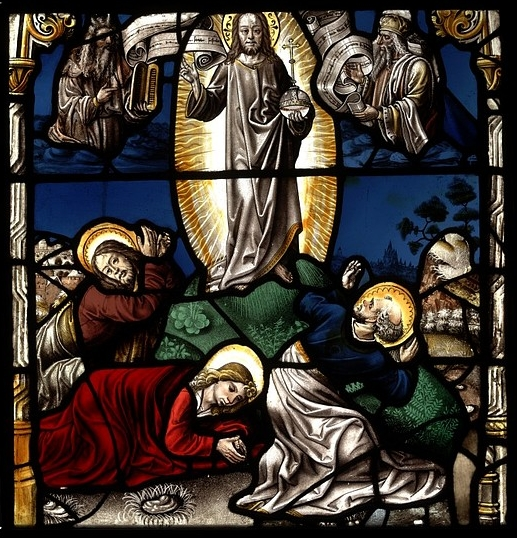
The Transfiguration, early 16th-century stained glass from Mariawald Abbey near Cologne

Below is the text of the hymn from the Ballad of the Passion (1527) by Heinrich Müller with a 16th-century translation from The Gude and Godlie Ballatis.

Hilf, Gott, daß mirs gelinge, du edler Schöpfer mein, die Silben reimweis zwinge Lob und Ehren dein, daß ich mag fröhlich heben an, von deinem Wort zu singen. Herr, du wollst mir beistan.	Help, God, the formar of all thing. That to Thy gloir may be my dyte; Be baith at end and beginning, That I may mak ane sang perfyte Of Jesus Christis Passioun, Sinnaris onlie Saluatioun, As witnes is Thy word in write.

=== Easter BWV 625–630 ===
- BWV 625 Christ lag in Todesbanden [Christ lay in the bonds of death]

MIDI rendition

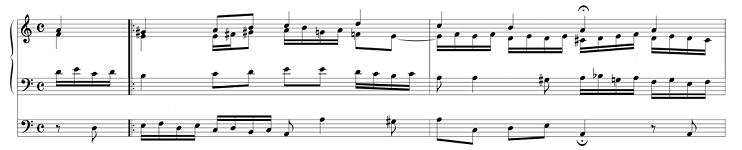

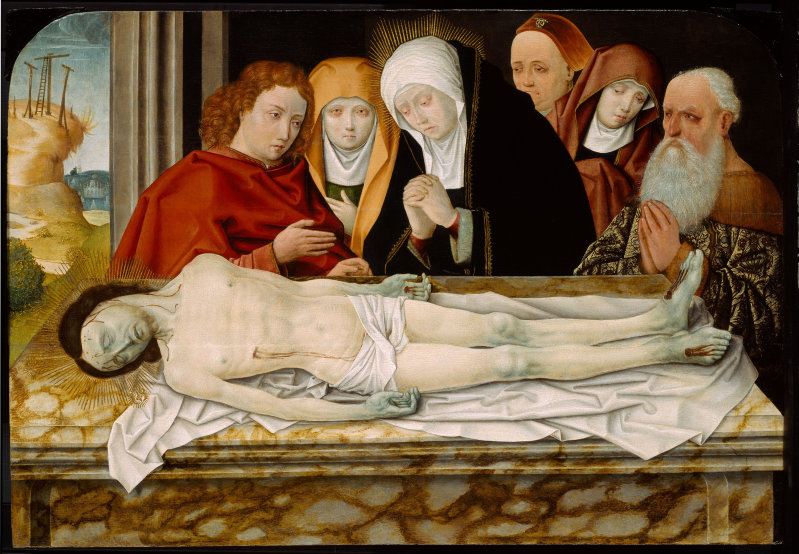
Entombment of Christ, early 16th-century painting from Cologne

Below are the first and fourth verses of Martin Luther's Easter hymn Christ lag in Todesbanden with the English translation of Paul England.

Christ lag in Todesbanden, für unsre Sünd' gegeben, der ist wieder erstanden und hat uns bracht das Leben. des wir sollen fröhlich sein, Gott loben und dankbar sein und singen: Halleluja! Halleluja! ∘∘∘ Es war ein wunderlicher Krieg, da Tod und Leben rungen; das Leben, das behielt den Sieg, es hat den Tod verschlungen. Die Schrift hat verkündet das, wie ein Tod den andern fraß, ein Spott der Tod ist worden. Halleluja!	Christ lay in Death's dark prison, It was our sin that bound Him; This day hath He arisen, And sheds new life around Him. Therefore let us joyful be And praise our God right heartily. So sing we Hallelujah! Hallelujah! ∘∘∘ How fierce and dreadful was the strife When Life with Death contended; For Death was swallowed up by Life And all his power was ended. God of old, the Scriptures show, Did promise that it should be so. O Death, where's now thy victory? Hallelujah!

BWV 625 is based on the hymn tune of Luther's "Christ lag in Todesbanden". The sharp on the second note was a more modern departure, already adopted by the composer-organists Bruhns, Böhm and Scheidt and by Bach himself in his early cantata Christ lag in Todes Banden, BWV 4. The chorale prelude is in four parts for single manual and pedals, with the cantus firmus in the soprano voice. It closely follows the four voices of Bach's earlier harmonisation in the four-part chorale BWV 278, with virtually no changes in the cantus firmus. The two accompanying inner parts and pedal are elaborated by a single motif of four or eight semiquavers descending in steps. It is derived from the final descending notes of the melody:

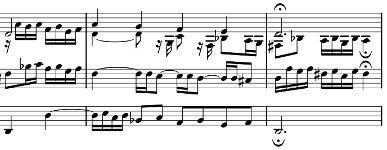

The semiquaver motif runs continuously throughout the piece, passing from one lower voice to another. Commentators have given different interpretations of what the motif might symbolise: for Schweitzer (1905) it was "the bonds of death" (Todesbanden) and for Hermann Keller "the rolling away of the stone". Some have also seen the suspensions between bars as representing "the bonds of death". These interpretations can depend on the presumed tempo of the chorale prelude. A very slow tempo was adopted by the school of late nineteenth and early twentieth century French organists, such as Guilmant and Dupré: for them the mood of the chorale prelude was quiet, inward-looking and mournful; Dupré even saw in the descending semiquavers "the descent by the holy women, step by step, to the tomb". At a faster tempo, as has become more common, the mood becomes more exultant and vigorous, with a climax at the words Gott loben und dankbar sein ("praise our God right heartily"), where the music becomes increasingly chromatic. Williams (2003) suggests that the motif might then resemble the Gewalt ("power") motif in the cello part of BWV 4, verse 3; and that the turmoil created by the rapidly changing harmonies in some bars might echo the word Krieg ("war") in verse 4.

- BWV 626 Jesus Christus, unser Heiland, der den Tod überwand [Jesus Christ, our Saviour, who conquered death]

MIDI rendition

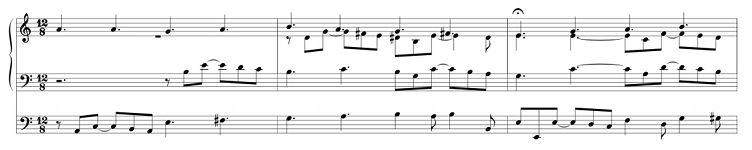

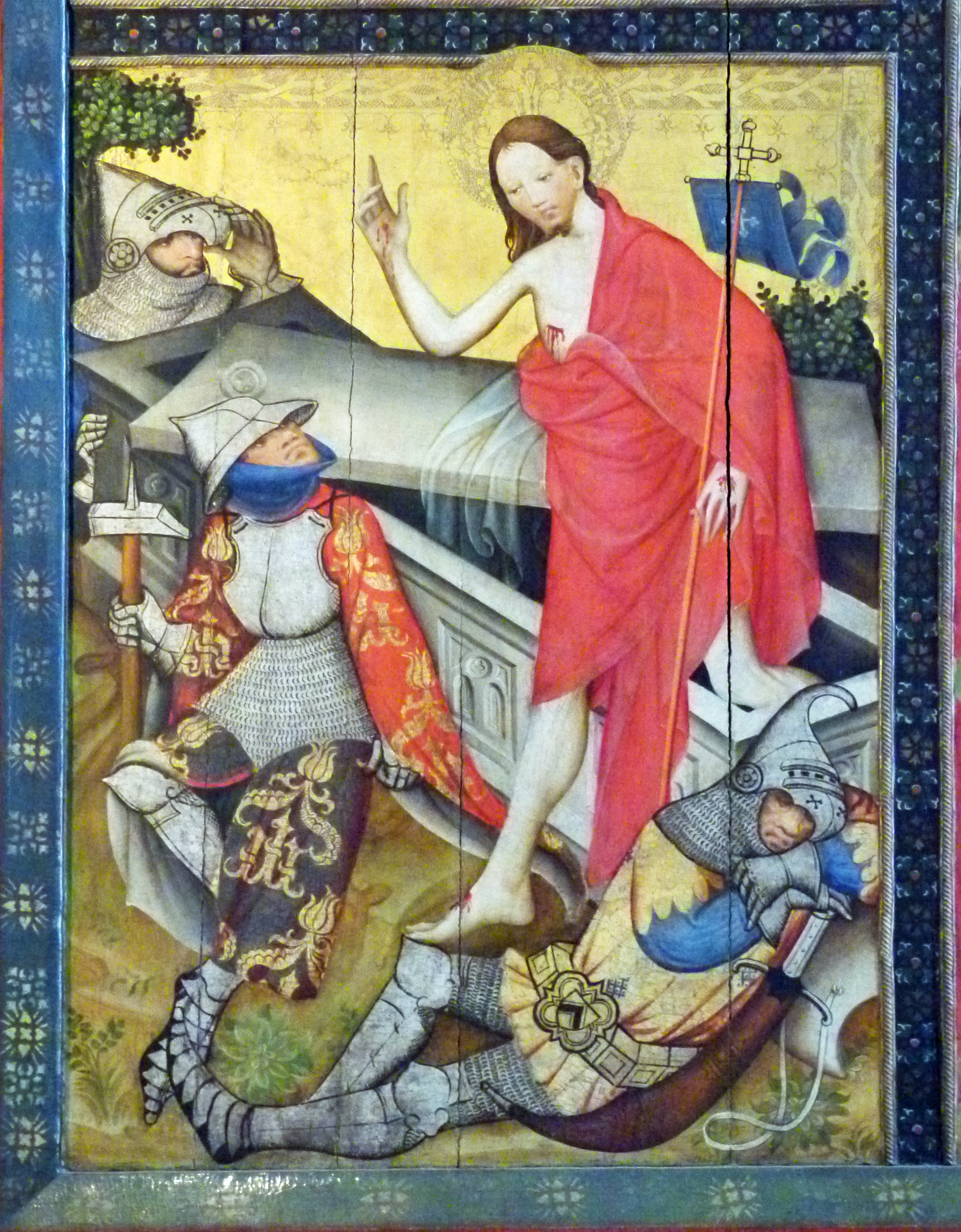
Resurrection, Wildungen Altarpiece, Konrad von Soest

Below is the first verse of Martin Luther's Easter hymn Jesus Christus, unser Heiland, der den Tod überwand with the English translation by George MacDonald.

Jesus Christus unser Heiland, der den Tod überwand, ist auferstanden, die Sünd' hat er gefangen. Kyrie eleison!	Jesus Christ, our Saviour true, He who Death overthrew, Is up arisen, And sin hath put in prison. Kyrieleison.

- BWV 627 Christ ist erstanden [Christ is risen]

MIDI rendition

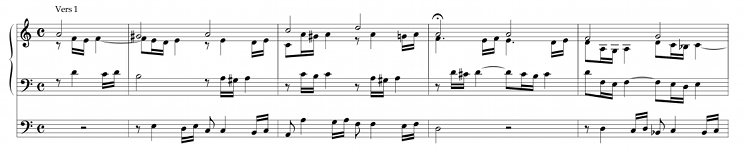
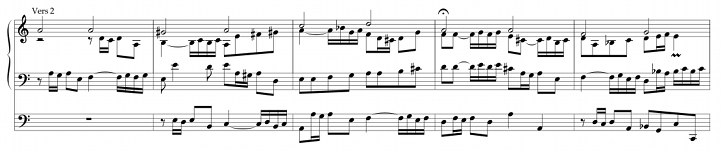
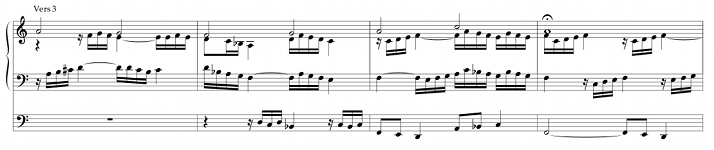

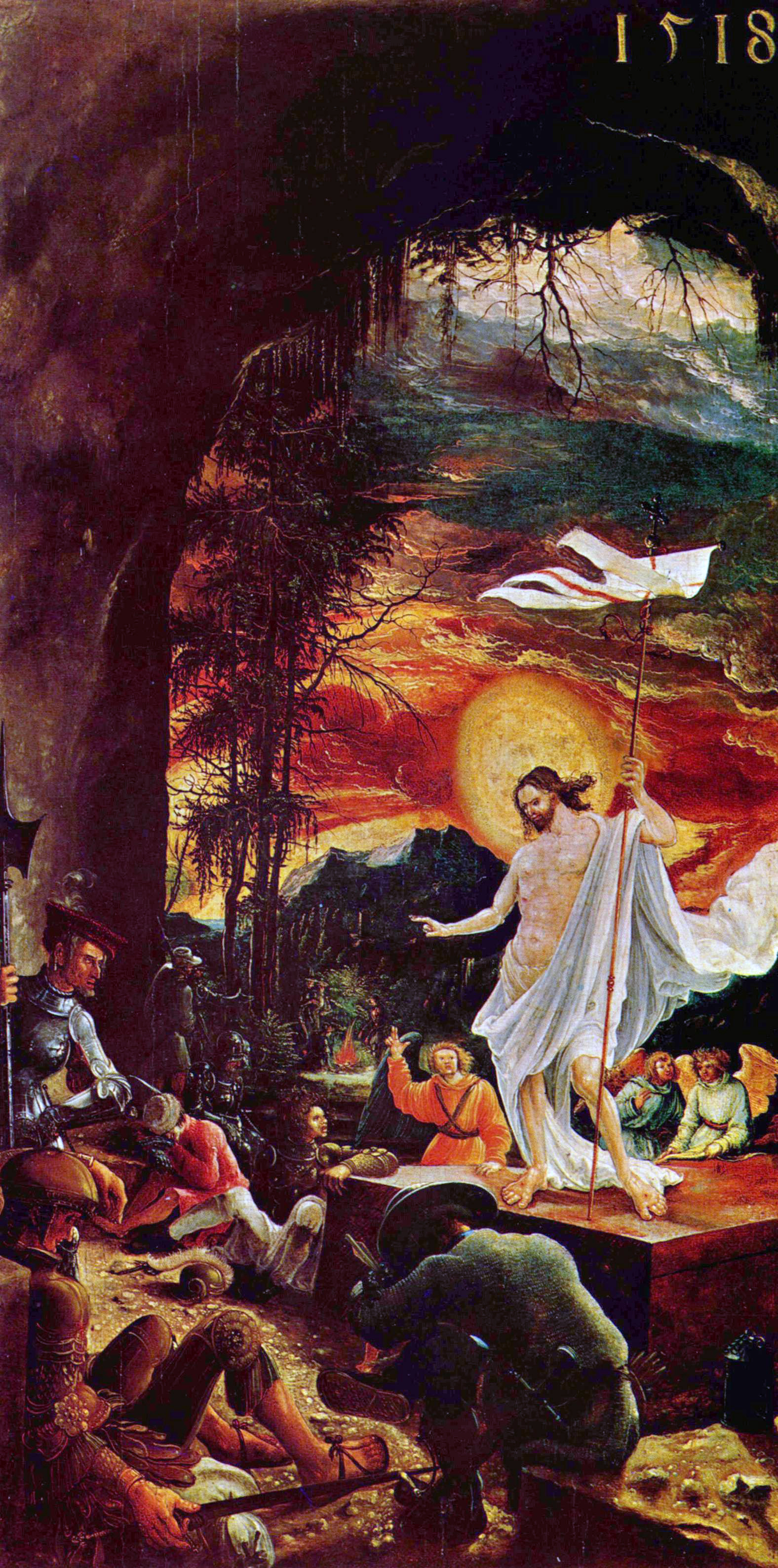
Resurrection, Albrecht Altdorfer

Below is the text of the three verses of the Easter hymn Christ ist erstanden with the English translation of Myles Coverdale.

Christ ist erstanden Von der Marter alle, Des solln wir alle froh sein, Christ will unser Trost sein. Kyrieleis. ∘∘∘ Wär er nicht erstanden, So wär die Welt vergangen; Seit daß er erstanden ist, So lobn wir den Vater Jesu Christ. Kyrieleis. ∘∘∘ Halleluja, Halleluja, Halleluja! Des solln wir alle froh sein, Christ will unser Trost sein. Kyrieleis.	Christe is now rysen agayne From His death and all His payne: Therfore wyll we mery be, And rejoyse with Him gladly. Kirieleyson, ∘∘∘ Had He not rysen agayne, We had ben lost, this is playne: But sen He is rysen in dede. Let us love Hym all with spede. Kirieleyson. ∘∘∘ Now is tyme of gladnesse. To synge of the Lorde's goodnesse: Therfore glad now wyll we be, And rejoyse in Hym onely. Kirieleyson.

- BWV 628 Erstanden ist der heil'ge Christ [The holy Christ is risen]

MIDI rendition

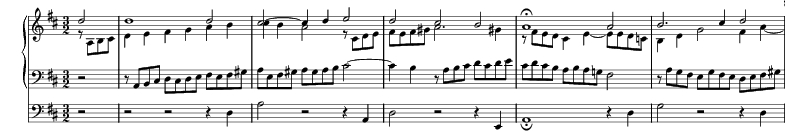

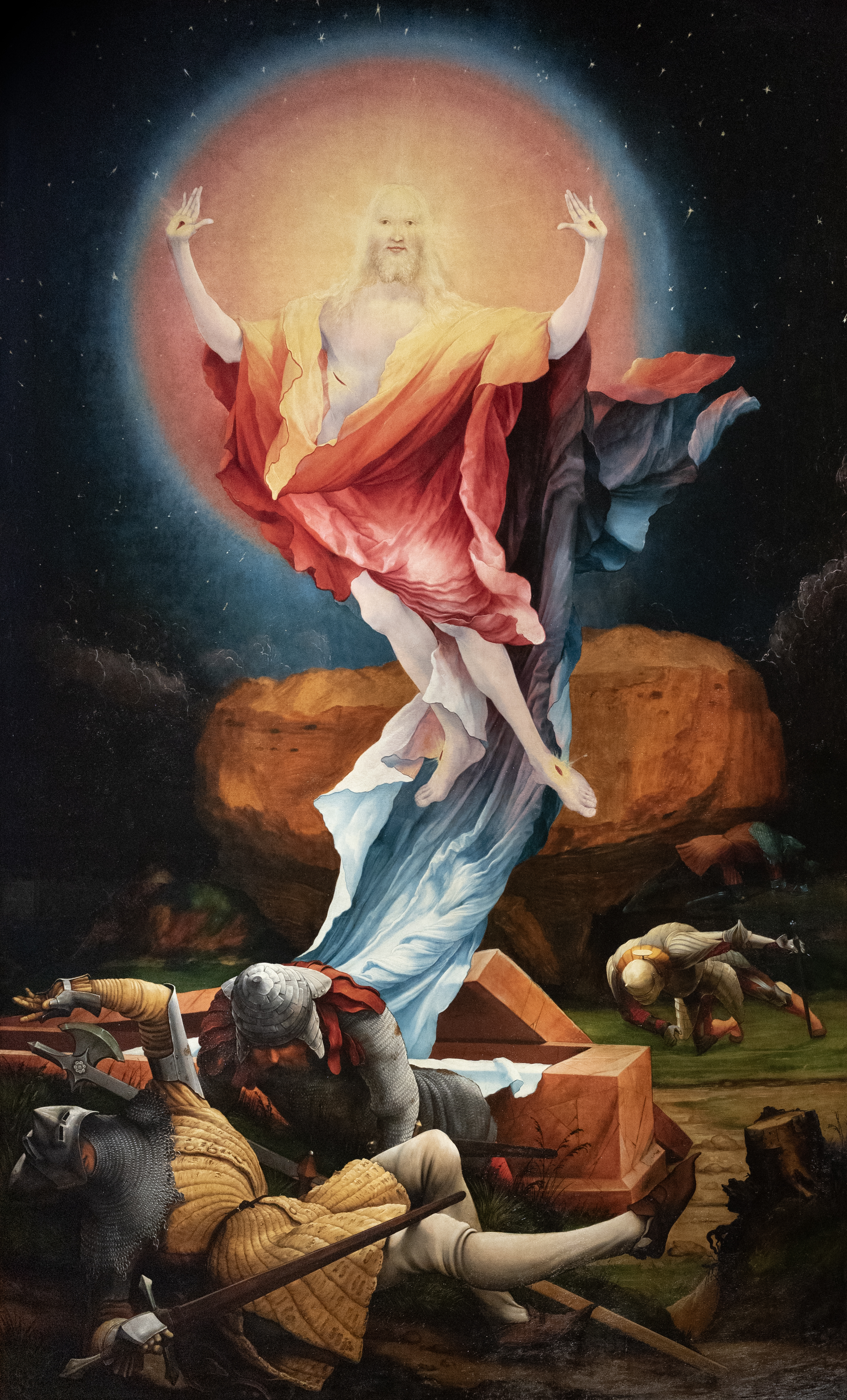
Resurrection, Isenheim Altarpiece, Matthias Grünewald

Below is the traditional Easter carol Surrexit Christus hodie in German and English translations.

Erstanden ist der heilge Christ, alleluia der aller Welt ein Tröster ist alleluia. Und wär er nicht erstanden, alleluia so wär die Welt vergangen, alleluia.	Christ our Lord is Risen to-day, Hallelujah Christ, our Life, our Light, our Way, Hallelujah. The Object of our Love and Faith, Hallelujah Who but died to conquer Death, Hallelujah.

- BWV 629 Erschienen ist der herrliche Tag [The glorious day has come] a 2 Clav. et Ped.

MIDI rendition

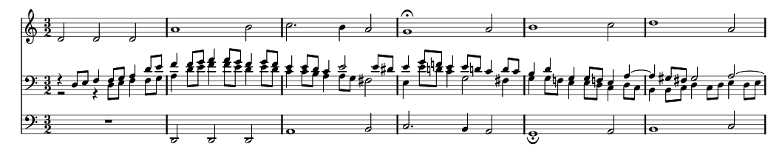

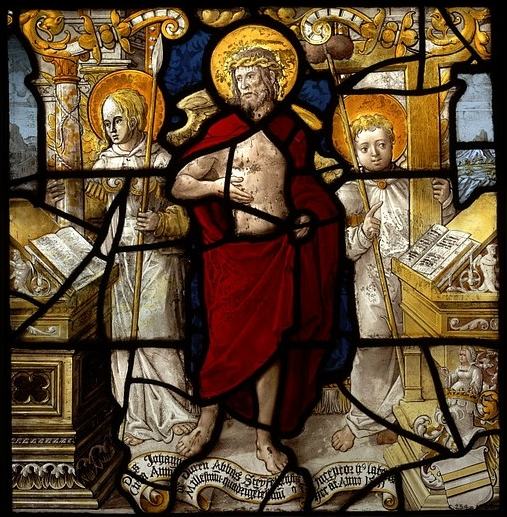
Christ with angels, early 16th-century stained glass from Steinfeld Abbey

Below is the first verse of Nikolaus Herman's hymn Erschienen ist der herrlich Tag with the English translation of Arthur Russell.

Erschienen ist der herrlich Tag, dran sich niemand gnug freuen mag; Christ, unser Herr, heut triumphiert, all seine Feind er gefangen führt. Halleluja!	The day hath dawned — the day of days Transcending all our joy and praise: This day our Lord triumphant rose; This day He captive led our foes. Hallelujah!

- BWV 630 Heut triumphieret Gottes Sohn [Today the Son of God triumphs]

MIDI rendition

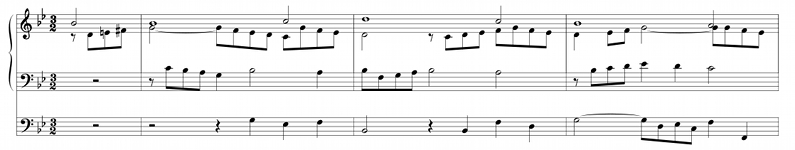

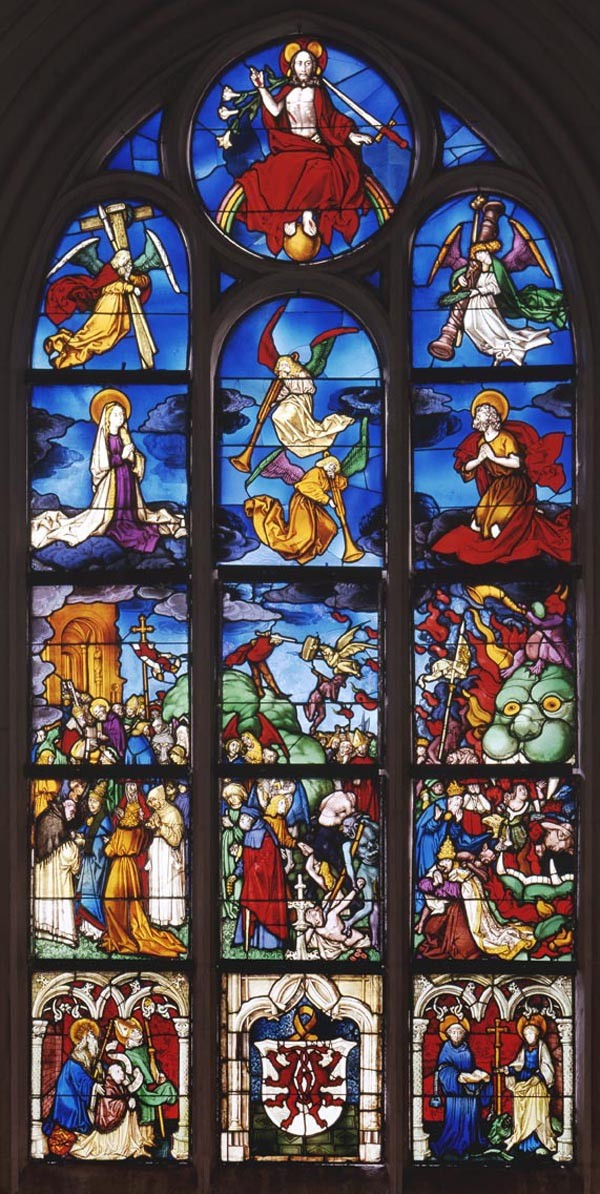
Last Judgement, Eichstätt, early 16th-century stained glass designed by Hans Holbein

Below is the first verse of Caspar Stolshagen's Easter hymn Heut triumphieret Gottes Sohn by Bartholomäus Gesius with the English translation of George Ratcliffe Woodward.

Heut triumphieret Gottes Sohn, der von dem Tod erstanden schon, Halleluja, Halleluja, mit großer Pracht und Herrlichkeit, des dankn wir ihm in Ewigkeit. Halleluja, Halleluja.	Today God's only-gotten Son Arose from death, and triumph won, Alleluya, Alleluya, In mighty pomp and rich array; His therefore be the praise alway. Alleluya, Alleluya.

=== Pentecost BWV 631–634 ===
- BWV 631 Komm, Gott Schöpfer, Heiliger Geist [Come God, Creator, Holy Ghost]

MIDI rendition

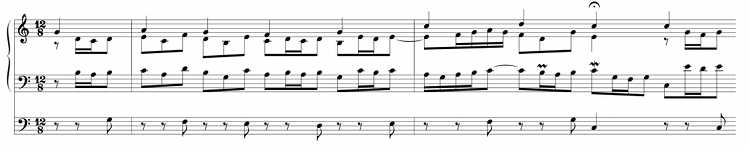

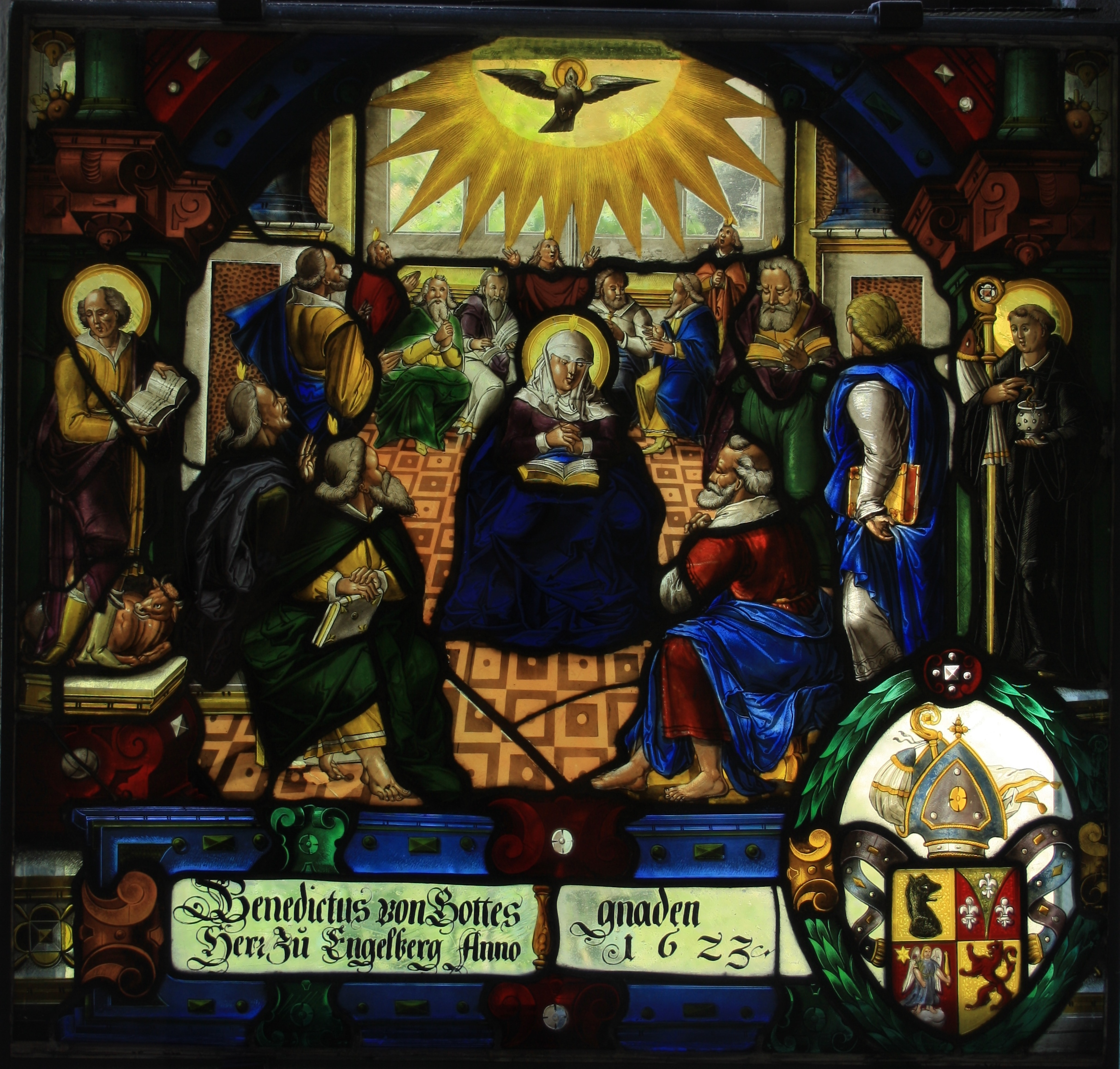
Pentecost, early 17th-century stained glass from Wettingen Abbey in Switzerland

Below are the first and last verses of Martin Luther's hymn for Pentecost Komm, Gott Schöpfer, Heiliger Geist with the English translation of George MacDonald.

Komm, Gott Schöpfer, Heiliger Geist, besuch' das Herz der Menschen dein, mit Gnaden sie füll', wie du weißt, daß dein Geschöpf vorhin sein. ∘∘∘ Gott Vater sei Lob und dem Sohn, der von den Todten auferstund; dem Tröster sei dasselb' gethan in Ewigkeit alle Stund'.	Come, God, Creator, Holy Ghost, Visit the heart of all Thy men; Fill them with grace, the way Thou know'st; What Thine was, make it again. ∘∘∘ Praise God the Father, and the Son, Who from the dead arose in power; Like praise to the Consoling One, Evermore and every hour.

- BWV 632 Herr Jesu Christ, dich zu uns wend [Lord Jesus Christ, turn to us]

BWV 632

MIDI rendition

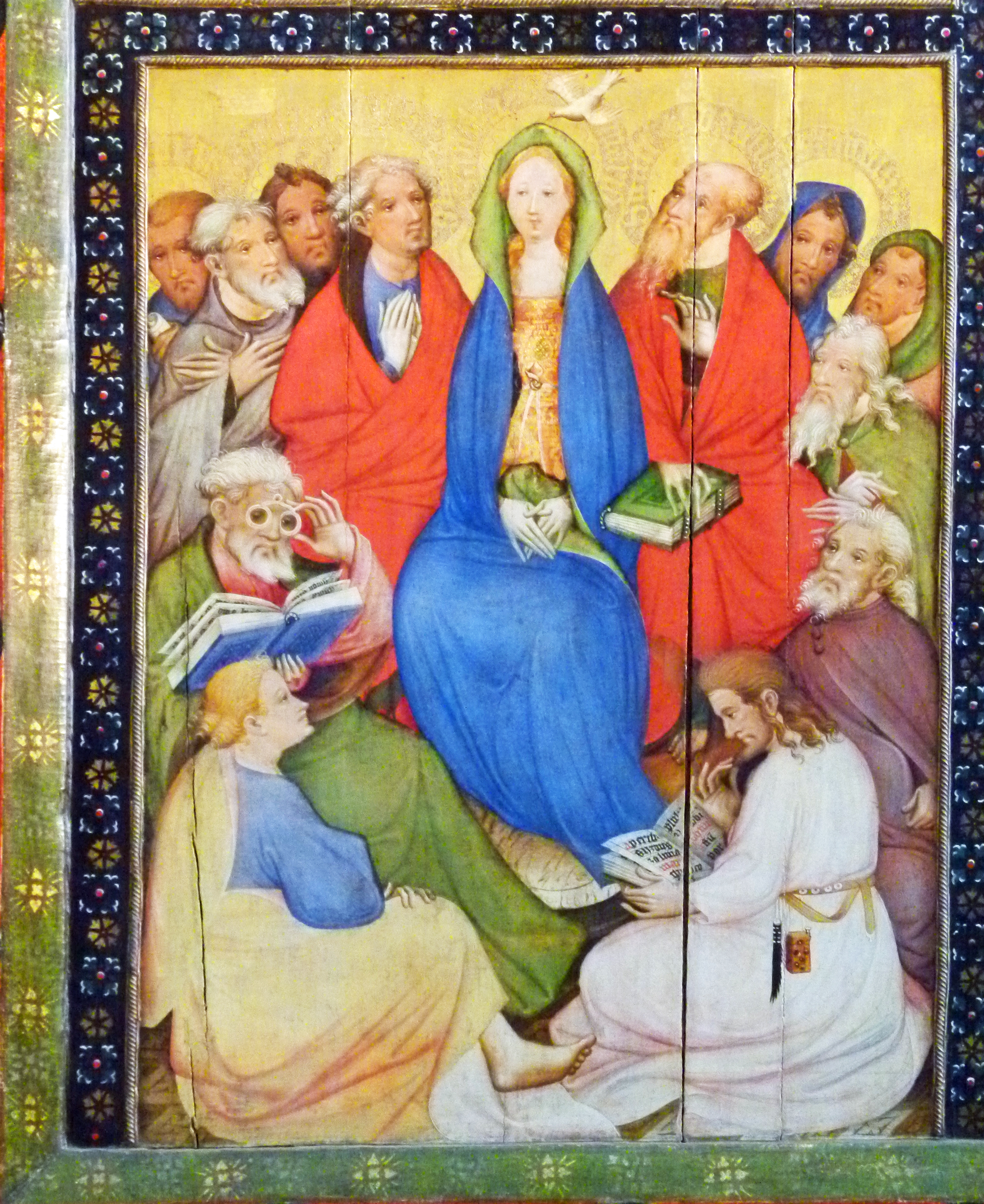
Pentecost, Wildunger Altarpiece, Konrad von Soest

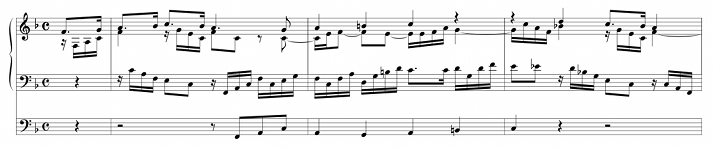

Below are the first and third verses of the Lutheran hymn Herr Jesu Christ, dich zu uns wend by Wilhelm, Duke of Saxe-Weimar (1648) with the English translation of John Christian Jacobi. Throughout Thuringia and Saxony this became the hymn that the congregation sang as the priest entered the pulpit before delivering his Sunday sermon.

Herr Jesu Christ, dich zu uns wend, dein'n Heil'gen Geist du zu uns send! mit Lieb' und Gnad', Herr, uns regier und uns den Weg zu Wahrheit führ. ∘∘∘ Bis wir singen mit Gottes Heer: heilig, heilig ist Got der Herr! und schauen dich von Angesicht in ew'ger Freud' und sel'gem Licht.	Lord Christ, reveal Thy holy face, And send the Spirit of Thy grace, To fill our hearts with fervent zeal. To learn Thy truth, and do Thy will. ∘∘∘ Till we with angels join to sing Eternal praise to Thee, our King; Till we behold Thy face most bright, In joy and everlasting light.

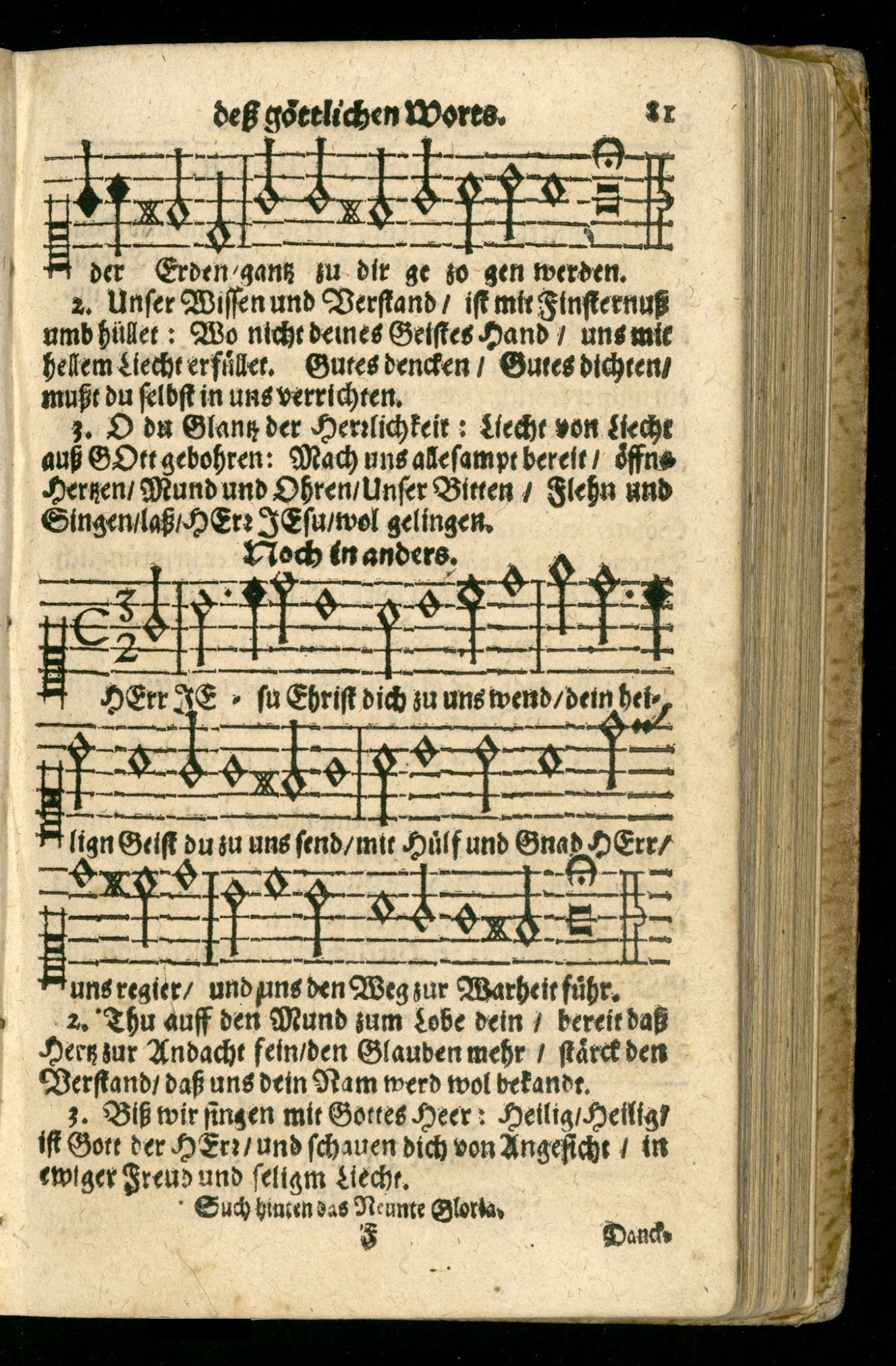
Hymn in 1691 Württemberg hymnal with soprano clef

Although, with its references to the Holy Spirit, the hymn has relevance to Pentecost, its customary use in Sunday services almost certainly prompted Bach to compose several settings (BWV 622, BWV 655, BWV 709, BWV 726 and BWV 749). Johann Gottfried Walther, Bach's distant cousin and the organist in the Stadtkirche in Weimar, also set the hymn as a chorale prelude and as a partita with many variations.

BWV 632 is written for single keyboard and pedal with the cantus firmus in the soprano part: it starts with a characteristic triad, at first concealed by the intermediate notes of the legato dotted rhythm. The same suspirans triad motif, like a broken chord or arpeggio, forms the basis of the accompaniment in the two inner voices: the imitative responses between the parts providing a steady flow of semiquaver figures, rising and falling, melifluous and sweet. More than a simple accompaniment, the push the harmonies forward, revealing it unexpectedly at every turn. Below them the pedal bass provides a distinctive accompaniment in quavers and crotchets, starting off with a quaver triad. Although largely moving in steps, like a walking bass, the pedal plays a type of canon two octaves below the cantus. The canon is itself disguised, in crotchets in the first half with the same rhythm as the soprano; but in the second half it is heard in fragmentary form at double the speed in quavers.

The accompanying arpeggio motifs in the inner parts are not dissimilar to figurations in settings of the hymn by Georg Böhm and Walther (the 6th variation in his partita). But the light and airy texture of the keyboard writing has more in common with the harpsichord allemande, such as BuxWV 238/1 below, from the thirteenth keyboard suite of Dieterich Buxtehude: the introductory upbeat; the repeats of binary dance form; and the arpeggiated accompaniment at the cadences.

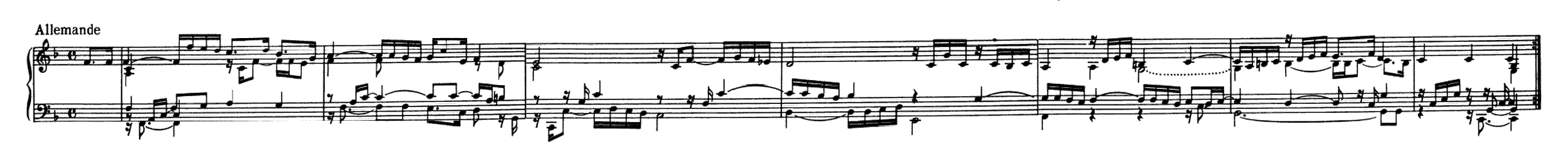

The reprise of the second part differs from the hymn as it appears in hymnbooks; but the stream of repeated triadic motifs—which Schweitzer (1911a) interpreted as constant repetitions of Herr Jesu Christ—add to the mood of supplication in the chorale prelude. Hermann Keller has suggested that Bach might have employed the canon as musical iconography for the plea to be "led" at the end of the first verse: und uns den Weg zu Wahrheit führ ("and lead us on the path of truth").

- BWV 633 Liebster Jesu, wir sind hier (distinctius) [Dearest Jesus, we are here] in Canone alla Quinta, a 2 Clav. et Ped.

MIDI rendition

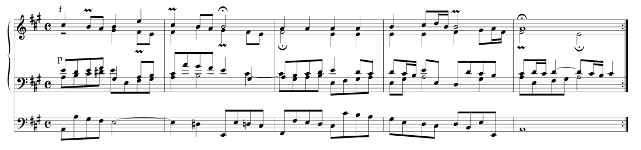

- BWV 634 Liebster Jesu, wir sind hier [Dearest Jesus, we are here] in Canone alla Quinta, a 2 Clav. et Ped.

MIDI rendition

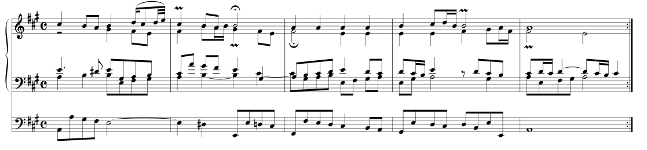

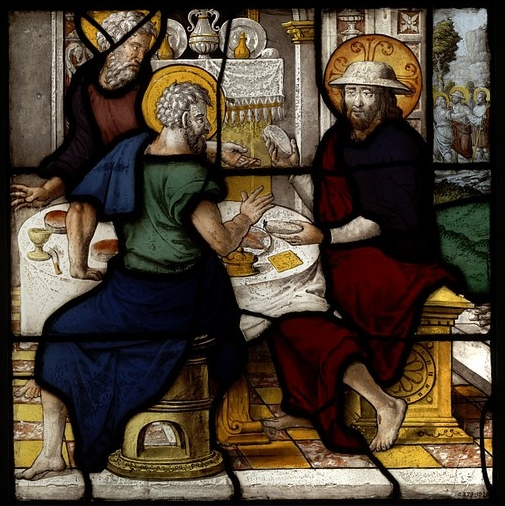
Supper at Emmaus, early 16th-century German stained glass

Below is the first verse of Tobias Clausnitzer's Lutheran hymn Liebster Jesu, wir sind hier with the English translation of Catherine Winkworth.

Liebster Jesu, wir sind hier, dich und dein Wort anzuhören; lenke Sinnen und Begier auf die süßen Himmelslehren, daß die Herzen von der Erden ganz zu dir gezogen werden.	Blessed Jesu, at Thy word We are gathered all to hear Thee; Let our hearts and souls be stirred Now to seek and love and fear Thee, By Thy teachings sweet and holy Draw from earth to love Thee solely.

=== Catechism hymns BWV 635–638 ===
- BWV 635 Dies sind die heil'gen zehn Gebot [These are the ten commandments]

MIDI rendering

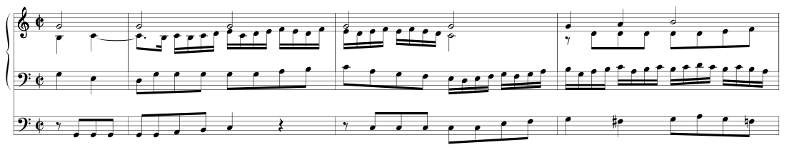

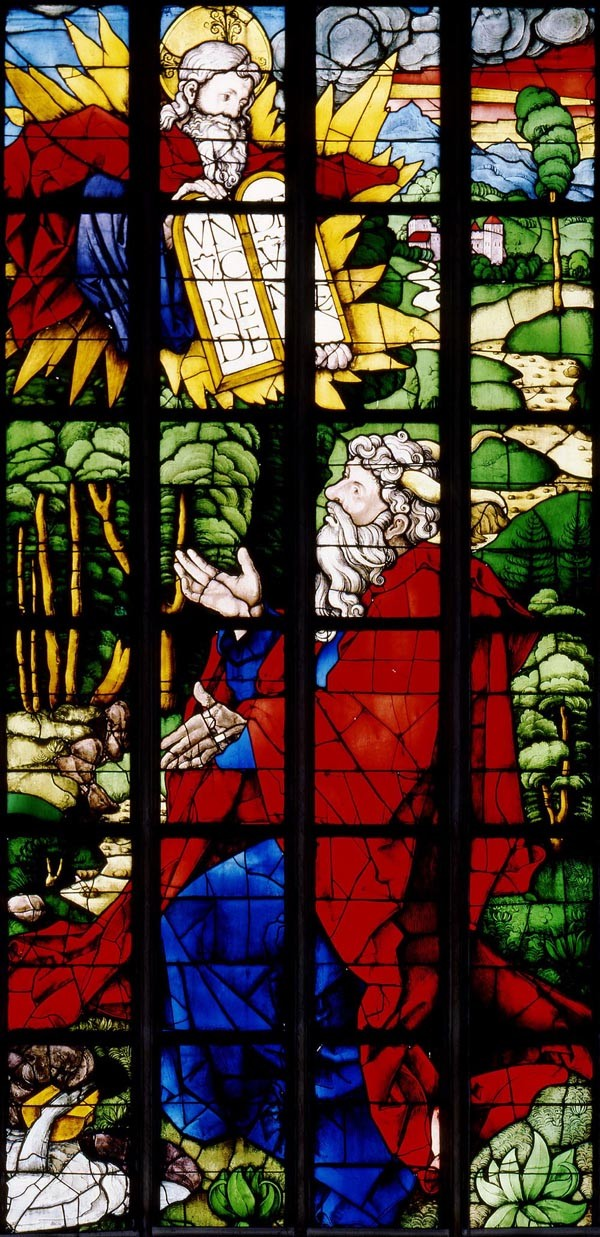
Albrecht Dürer: Moses receiving the Ten Commandments, stained glass panel, Jakobskirche, Straubing

Below are the first and last two verses of the Lutheran catechism hymn Dies sind die heil'gen zehn Gebot (the Ten Commandments) with an English translation by George MacDonald.

Dies sind die heil'gen Zehn Gebot', die uns gab unser Herre Gott durch Moses, seinen Diener treu, hoch auf dem Berg Sinai. Kyrieleis! ∘∘∘ Die Gebot all' uns geben sind, daß du dein' Sünd', o Menschenkind, erkennen sollst und lernen wohl, wie man vor Gott leben soll. Kyrieleis! ∘∘∘ Das helf' uns der Herr Jesus Christ, der unser Mittler worden ist; es ist mit unserm Tun verlor'n, verdienen doch eitel Zorn. Kyrieleis!	These are the holy ten commands, Which came to us from God's own hands, By Moses, who obeyed His will, On the top of Sinai's hill. Kyrioleis. ∘∘∘ To us come these commands, that so Thou, son of man, thy sins mayst know. And with this lesson thy heart fill, That man must live for God's will. Kyrioleis. ∘∘∘ May Christ our Lord help us in this, For He our mediator is; Our own work is a hopeless thing, Wrath alone all it can bring. Kyrioleis.

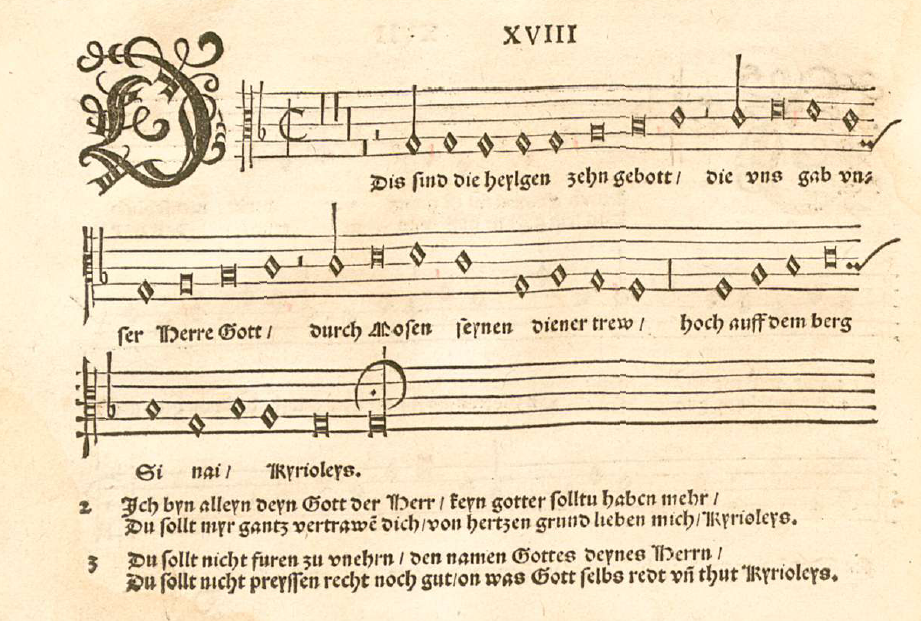
The Ten Commandments in the 1524 hymnbook of Luther and Walter

The Lutheran Erfurter Enchiridion of 1524 contains the text with the melody, which was also used for In Gottes Nahmen fahren wir, a pilgrims' hymn. Bach wrote a four-part chorale on the hymn tune in BWV 298; he used it for the trumpet canon in the opening chorus of cantata BWV 77; and much later he set it for organ in the first two of the catechism chorale preludes, BWV 678 and 679, of Clavier-Übung III.

The chorale prelude BWV 635 is in the mixolydian mode with the cantus firmus in the soprano voice in simple minims. The accompaniment in the three lower voices is built up from two motifs each containing the repeated notes that characterise the theme. The first motif in quavers is a contracted version of the first line of the cantus (GGGGGGABC), first heard in the pedal bass in bars 1 and 2. It also occurs in inverted form. This emphatic hammering motif is passed imitatively between the lower voices as a form of canon. The second motif, first heard in the alto part in bars 2 and 3, is made up of five groups of 4 semiquavers, individual groups being related by inversion (first and fifth) and reflection (second and third). The pivotal notes CCCDEF in this motif are also derived from the theme. The second motif is passed from voice to voice in the accompaniment—there are two passages where it is adapted to the pedal with widely spaced semiquavers alternating between the feet—providing an unbroken stream of semiquavers complementing the first motif.

The combined affekt of the four parts, with 25 repetitions of the quaver motif, is one of "confirming" the biblical laws chanted in the verses of the hymn. There is likewise a reference to "law" in the canon of the quaver motif. For Spitta (1899) the motif had "an inherent organic connection with the chorale itself". Some commentators, aware that the number "ten" of the Ten Commandments has been detected in the two chorale preludes of Clavier-Übung III, have endeavoured to find a hidden numerology in BWV 635. The attempts of Schweitzer (1905) have been criticised: Harvey Grace felt that Bach was "expressing the idea of insistence, order, dogma—anything but statistics." Williams (2003) points out, however, that if there is any intentional numerology, it might be in the occurrences of the strict form of the motif, with tone and semitone intervals matching the first entry: it occurs precisely ten times in the chorale prelude (m.1 – bass; m.1 – tenor; m.2 – bass; m.4 – bass; m.9 – tenor; m.10 – bass; m.11 – tenor; m.13 – tenor; m.15 – alto; m.18 – tenor).

- BWV 636 Vater unser im Himmelreich [Our Father who art in Heaven]

MIDI rendition

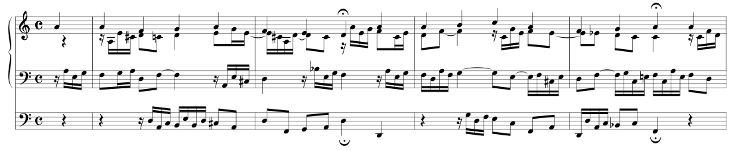

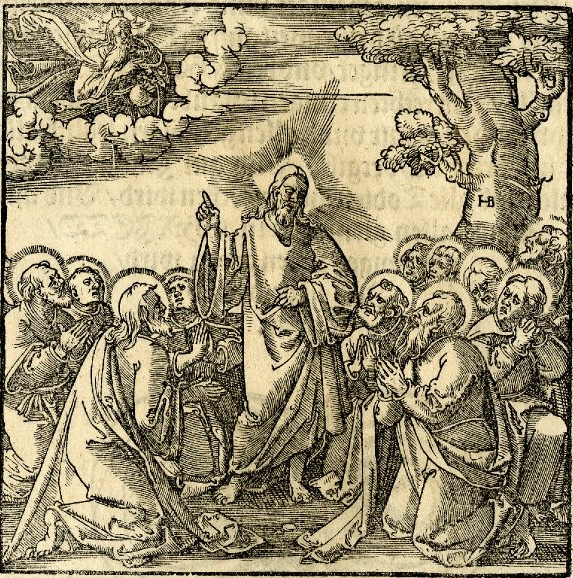
Hans Brosamer, 1550: woodcut in Luther's Small Catechism of Christ teaching His disciples the Lord's Prayer

Below are the first and last verses of Luther's hymn version of the Lord's Prayer based on his Small Catechism with the English translation of George MacDonald.

Vater unser im Himmelreich, der du uns alle heißest gleich Brüder sein und dich rufen an und willst das Beten von uns hab'n, gib, daß nicht bet' allein der Mund, hilf, daß es geh' von Herzensgrund! ∘∘∘ Amen, das ist, es werde wahr! stärk unsern Glauben immerdar, auf daß wir ja nicht zweifeln dran, was wir hiermit gebeten hab'n auf dein Wort in dem Namen dein; so sprechen wir das Amen fein.	Our Father in the heaven Who art, Who tellest all of us in heart Brothers to be, and on Thee call, And wilt have prayer from us all, Grant that the mouth not only pray, From deepest heart oh help its way. ∘∘∘ Amen, that is, let this come true! Strengthen our faith ever anew, That we may never be in doubt Of that we here have prayed about. In Thy name, trusting in Thy word. We say a soft Amen, O Lord.

Following the publication of the text and melody in 1539, the hymn was used in many choral and organ compositions. Amongst Bach's immediate predecessors, Dieterich Buxtehude wrote two settings of the hymn for organ—a freely composed chorale prelude in three verses (BuxWV 207) and a chorale prelude for two manuals and pedal (BuxWV 219); and Georg Böhm composed a partita and two chorale preludes (previously misattributed to Bach as BWV 760 and 761). Bach himself harmonised the hymn in BWV 416, with a later variant in one of the chorales from the St John Passion. He used it in cantatas BWV 90, 100 and 102 with a different text. Amongst the early organ compositions on Vater unser attributed to Bach, only the chorale prelude BWV 737 has been ascribed with any certainty. After Orgelbüchlein, Bach returned to the hymn with a pair of chorale preludes (BWV 682 and 683) in Clavier-Übung III.

In the chorale prelude BWV 636 the plain cantus firmus is in the soprano voice. The accompaniment in the inner parts and pedal is based on a four-note semiquaver suspirans motif (i.e. preceded by a rest or "breath") and a longer eight-note version; both are derived from the first phrase of the melody. In turn Bach's slight alteration of the melody in bars 1 and 3 might have been dictated by his choice of motif. The two forms of the motif and their inversions pass from one lower voice to another, producing a continuous stream of semiquavers; semiquavers in one voice are accompanied by quavers in the other two. The combined effect is of the harmonisation of a chorale by arpeggiated chords. Hermann Keller even suggested that Bach might have composed the chorale prelude starting from an earlier harmonisation; as Williams (2003) points out, however, although the harmonic structure adheres to that of a four-part chorale, the pattern of semiquavers and suspended notes is different for each bar and always enhances the melody, sometimes in unexpected ways. Schweitzer (1905) described the accompanying motifs as representing "peace of mind"(quiétude).

- BWV 637 Durch Adams Fall ist ganz verderbt [Through Adam's fall are wholly ruined]

MIDI rendition

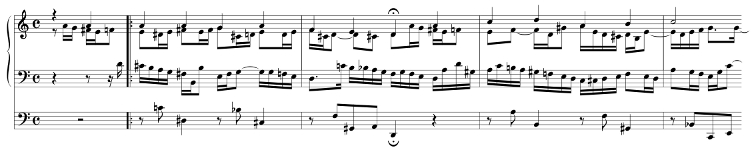

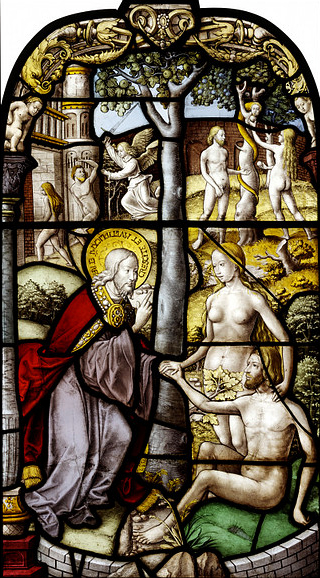
Marriage, Temptation and Fall of Adam, sixteenth century stained glass from Steinfeld Abbey

Below are the first and seventh verses of the hymn written in 1524 by Lazarus Spengler with an English translation by John Christian Jacobi.

Durch Adams Fall ist ganz verderbt menschlich Natur und Wesen, dasselb Gift ist auf uns errebt, daß wir nicht mocht'n genesen ohn' Gottes Trost, der uns erlöst hat von dem großen Schaden, darein die Schlang Eva bezwang, Gotts Zorn auf sich zu laden. ∘∘∘ Wer hofft in Gott und dem vertraut, wird nimmermehr zu Schanden; denn wer auf diesen Felsen baut, ob ihm gleich geht zuhanden wie Unfalls hie, hab ich doch nie den Menschen sehen fallen, der sich verläßt auf Gottes Trost, er hilft sein Gläub'gen allen.	When Adam fell, the frame entire Of nature was infected; The source, whence came the poison dire, Was not to be corrected: The lust accursed, indulged at first, Brought death as its production; But God's free grace hath saved our race From misery and destruction. ∘∘∘ But, who makes God his Hope and trust, Shall never be confounded: No Cleaver to this Rock is lost, Thou' ev'ry where surrounded With daring foes and trying woes; His Faith yet stands unshaken. Who loves the Lord shall by no sword Or woe be overtaken.

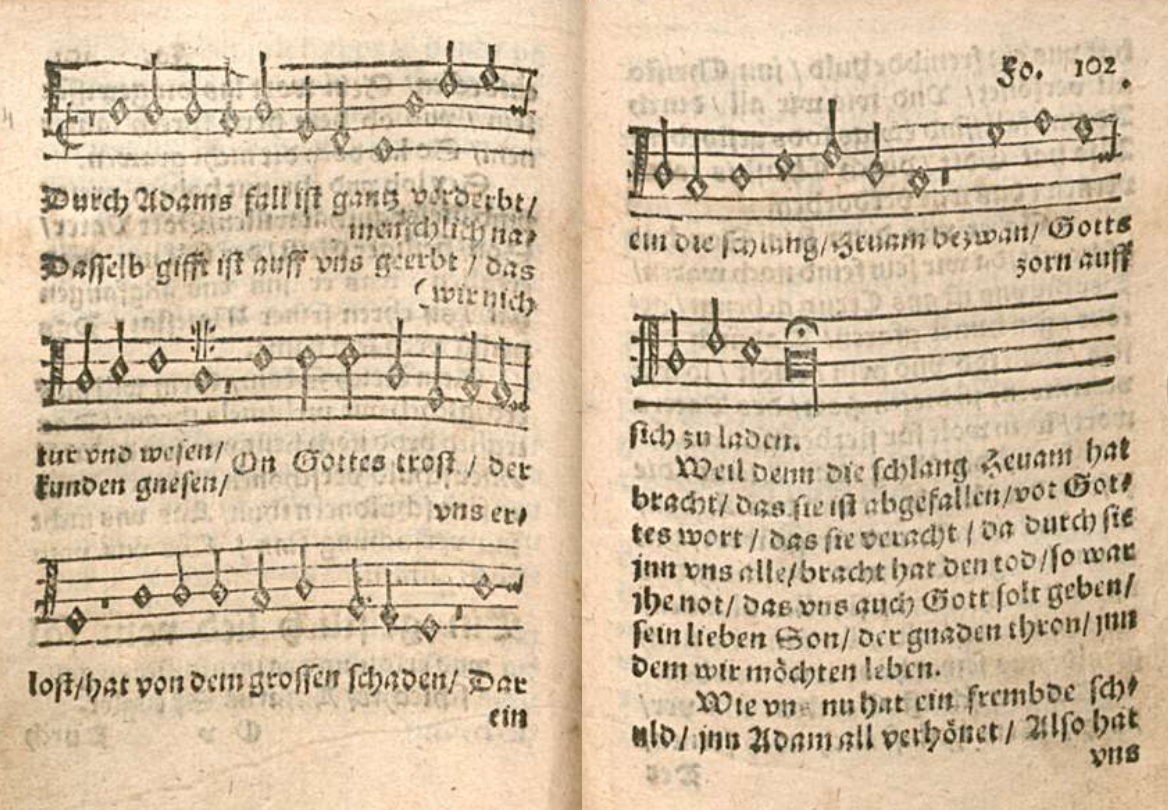
Durch Adams Fall in Luther's Geistliche Lieder, Wittenberg 1535

The penitential text, written in the Nuremberg of Hans Sachs and the Meistersingers where Spengler was town clerk, is concerned with "human misery and ruin", faith and redemption; it encapsulates some of the central tenets of the Lutheran Reformation. The melody, originally for a Reformation battle hymn of 1525, was first published with Spengler's text in 1535. Bach previously set it as a chorale prelude in the Kirnberger Collection (BWV 705) and Neumeister Collection (BWV 1101); the seventh verse also recurs in the closing chorales of cantatas BWV 18 and BWV 109. Dieterich Buxtehude had already set the hymn as a chorale prelude (BuxWV 183) prior to Bach.

The chorale prelude BWV 637 is one of the most original and imaginative in the Orgelbüchlein, with a wealth of motifs in the accompaniment. Scored for single manual and pedal, the unadorned cantus firmus is in the soprano voice. Beneath the melody in a combination of four different motifs, the inner parts wind sinuously in an uninterrupted line of semiquavers, moving chromatically in steps. Below them the pedal responds to the melodic line with downward leaps in diminished, major and minor sevenths, punctuated by rests. Bach's ingenious writing is constantly varying. The expressive mood is heightened by the fleeting modulations between minor and major keys; and by the dissonances between the melody and the chromatic inner parts and pedal. The abrupt leaps in the pedal part create unexpected changes in key; and halfway through the chorale prelude the tangled inner parts are inverted to produce an even stranger harmonic texture, resolved only in the final bars by the modulation into a major key.

The chorale prelude has generated numerous interpretations of its musical imagery, its relation to the text and to baroque affekt. Williams (2003) records that the dissonances might symbolise original sin, the downward leaps in the pedal the fall of Adam, and the modulations at the close hope and redemption; the rests in the pedal part could be examples of the affekt that the seventeenth century philosopher Athanasius Kircher called "a sighing of the spirit". Stinson (1999) points out that the diminished seventh interval used in the pedal part was customarily associated with "grief". The twisting inner parts have been interpreted as illustrating the words verderbt ("ruined") by Hermann Keller and Schlang ("serpent") by Jacques Chailley. Terry (1921) described the pedal part as "a series of almost irremediable stumbles"; in contrast Ernst Arfken saw the uninterrupted cantus firmus as representing constancy in faith. For Wolfgang Budday, Bach's departure from normal compositional convention was itself intended to symbolise the "corruption" and "depravity" of man. Spitta (1899) also preferred to view Bach's chorale prelude as representing the complete text of the hymn instead of individual words, distinguishing it from Buxtehude's earlier precedent. Considered to be amongst his most expressive compositions—Snyder (1987) describes it as "imbued with sorrow"—Buxtehude's setting employs explicit word-painting.

- BWV 638 Es ist das Heil uns kommen her [Salvation has come to us]

MIDI rendition

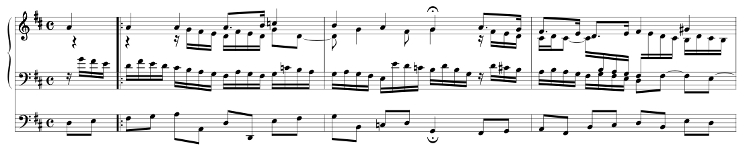

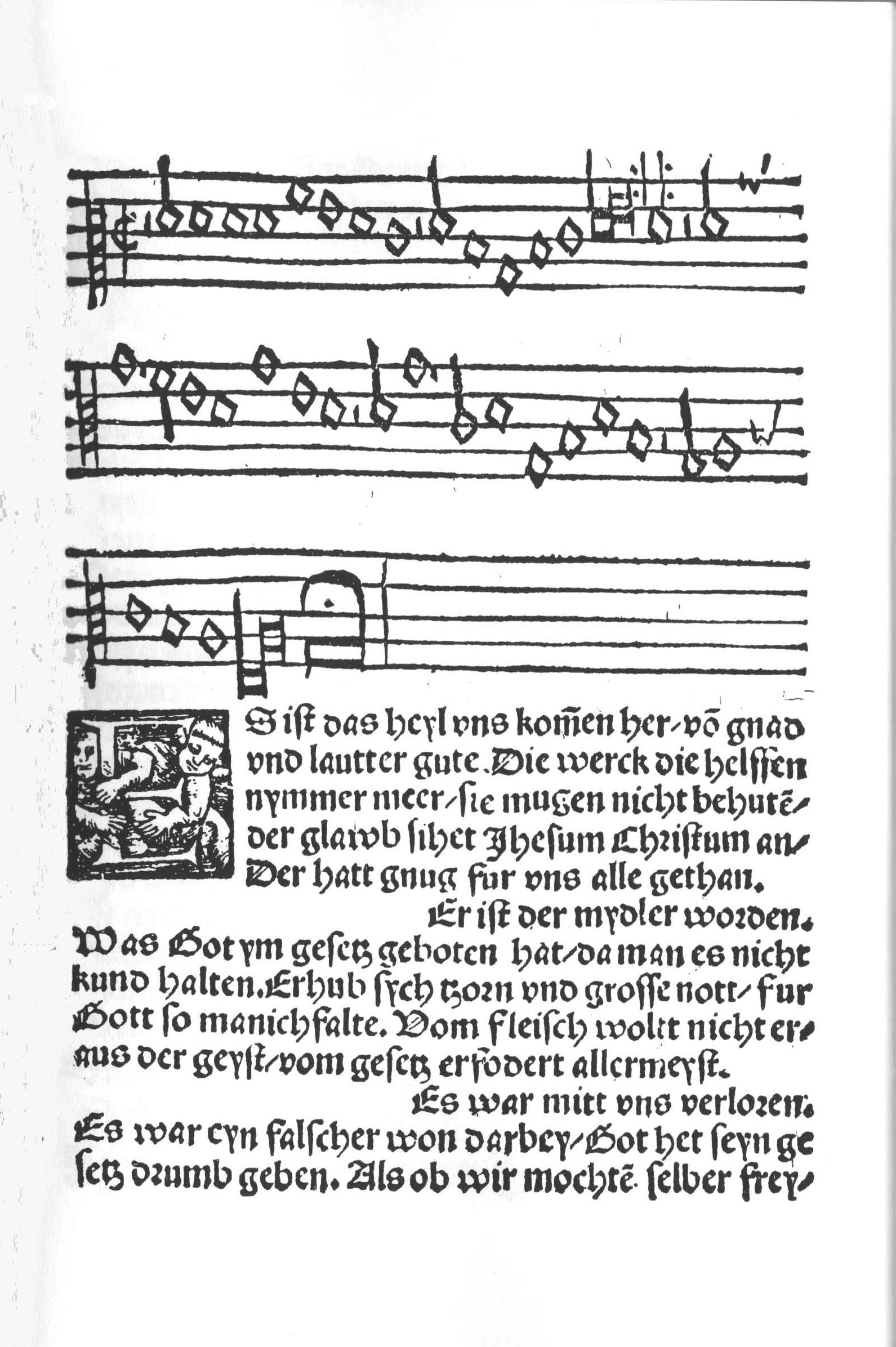
"Es ist das Heil uns kommen her" in the Erfurt Enchiridion, 1524

The first verse of the Lutheran hymn Es ist das Heil uns kommen her of Paul Speratus is given below with the English translation of John Christian Jacobi.

Es ist das Heil uns kommen her von Gnad' und lauter Güte, die Werke helfen nimmermehr, sie mögen nicht behüten, der Glaub' sieht Jesus Christus an der hat g'nug für uns all' getan, er ist der Mittler worden.	Our whole salvation doth depend On God's free grace and Spirit; Our fairest works can ne'er defend A boast in our own merit: Derived is all our righteousness From Christ and His atoning grace; He is our Mediator.

The text treats a central Lutheran theme—only faith in God is required for redemption. The melody is from an Easter hymn. Many composers had written organ settings prior to Bach, including Sweelinck, Scheidt and Buxtehude (his chorale prelude BuxWV 186). After Orgelbüchlein, Bach set the entire hymn in cantata Es ist das Heil uns kommen her, BWV 9; and composed chorales on single verses for cantatas 86, 117, 155 and 186.

In the chorale prelude BWV 638 for single manual and pedal, the cantus firmus is in the soprano voice in simple crotchets. The accompaniment in the inner voices is built on a four-note motif—derived from the hymn tune—a descending semiquaver scale, starting with a rest or "breath" (suspirans): together they provide a constant stream of semiquavers, sometimes in parallel sixths, running throughout the piece until the final cadence. Below them the pedal is a walking bass in quavers, built on the inverted motif and octave leaps, pausing only to mark the cadences at the end of each line of the hymn. The combination of the four parts conveys a joyous mood, similar to that of BWV 606 and 609. For Hermann Keller, the running quavers and semiquavers "suffuse the setting with health and strength." Stinson (1999) and Williams (2003) speculate that this chorale prelude and the preceding BWV 637, written on opposite sides of the same manuscript paper, might have been intended as a pair of contrasting catechism settings, one about sin, the other about salvation. Both have similar rhythmic structures in the parts, but one is in a minor key with complex chromatic harmonies, the other in a major key with firmly diatonic harmonies.

=== Miscellaneous BWV 639–644 ===
- BWV 639 Ich ruf zu dir, Herr Jesu Christ [I call to you, Lord Jesus Christ] a 2 Clav. et Ped.

MIDI rendition

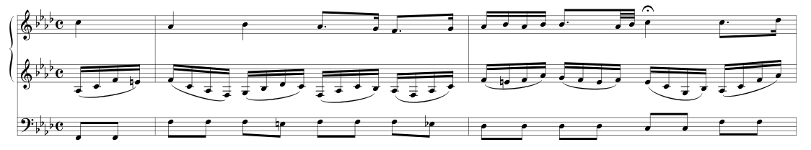

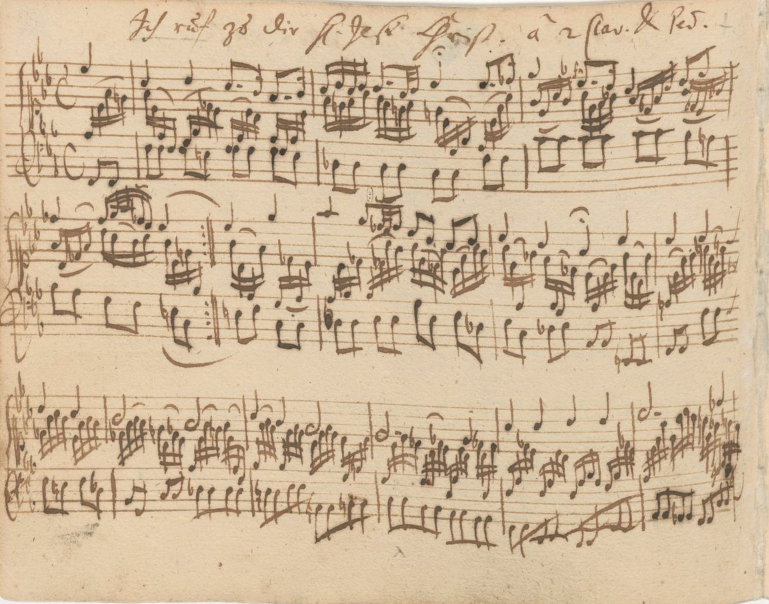
Autograph manuscript of Ich ruf zu dir, Herr Jesu Christ, BWV 639

Below is the first verse of Johannes Agricola's hymn with the English translation of John Christian Jacobi.

Ich ruf zu dir, Herr Jesu Christ, ich bitt, erhör mein Klagen; verleih mir Gnad zu dieser Frist, laß mich doch nicht verzagen. Den rechten Glauben, Herr, ich mein, den wollest du mir geben, dir zu leben, meim Nächsten nütz zu sein, dein Wort zu halten eben.	Lord, hear the voice of my complaint, To Thee I now commend me, Let not my heart and hope grow faint, But deign Thy grace to send me. True faith from Thee, my God, I seek, The faith that loves Thee solely. Keeps me lowly, And prompt to aid the weak, And mark each word that Thou dost speak.

"Ich ruf zu dir" is amongst the most popular chorale preludes in the collection. Pure in style, this ornamental chorale prelude has been described as "a supplication in time of despair". Written in the key of F minor, it is the unique prelude in trio form with voices in the two manuals and the pedal. It is possible that the unusual choice of key followed Bach's experience playing the new organ at Halle which employed more modern tuning. The ornamented melody in crotchets (quarter notes) sings in the soprano above a flowing legato semiquaver (16th note) accompaniment and gently pulsating repeated quavers (eighth notes) in the pedal continuo. Such viol-like semiquaver figures in the middle voice already appeared as "imitatio violistica" in the Tabulatura nova (1624) of Samuel Scheidt. The instrumental combination itself was used elsewhere by Bach: in the third movement of the cantata Schmücke dich, o liebe Seele, BWV 180 for soprano, violoncello piccolo and continuo; and the 19th movement of the St John Passion, with the middle voice provided by semiquaver arpeggios on the lute.

- BWV 640 In dich hab ich gehoffet, Herr [In you have I put my hope, Lord]

MIDI rendition

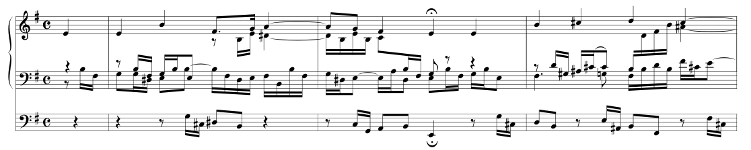

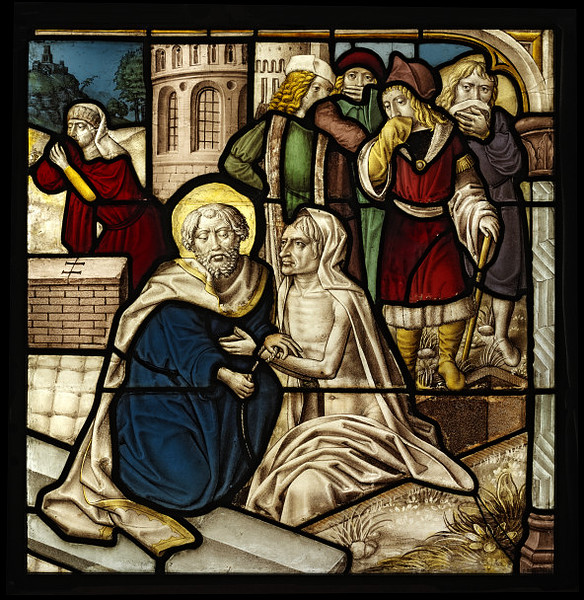
Raising of Lazarus, early 16th-century stained glass from Mariawald Abbey near Cologne

Below is the first verse of the Lutheran hymn In dich hab ich gehoffet, Herr of Adam Reissner with the English translation of Catherine Winkworth.

In dich hab' ich gehoffet, Herr, hilf, daß ich nicht zuschanden werd' noch ewiglich zu Spotte! Das bitt' ich dich, erhalte mich in deiner Treu', mein Gotte!	In Thee, Lord, have I put my trust, Leave me not helpless in the dust, Let not my hope be brought to shame, But still sustain, Through want and pain. My faith that Thou art aye the same.

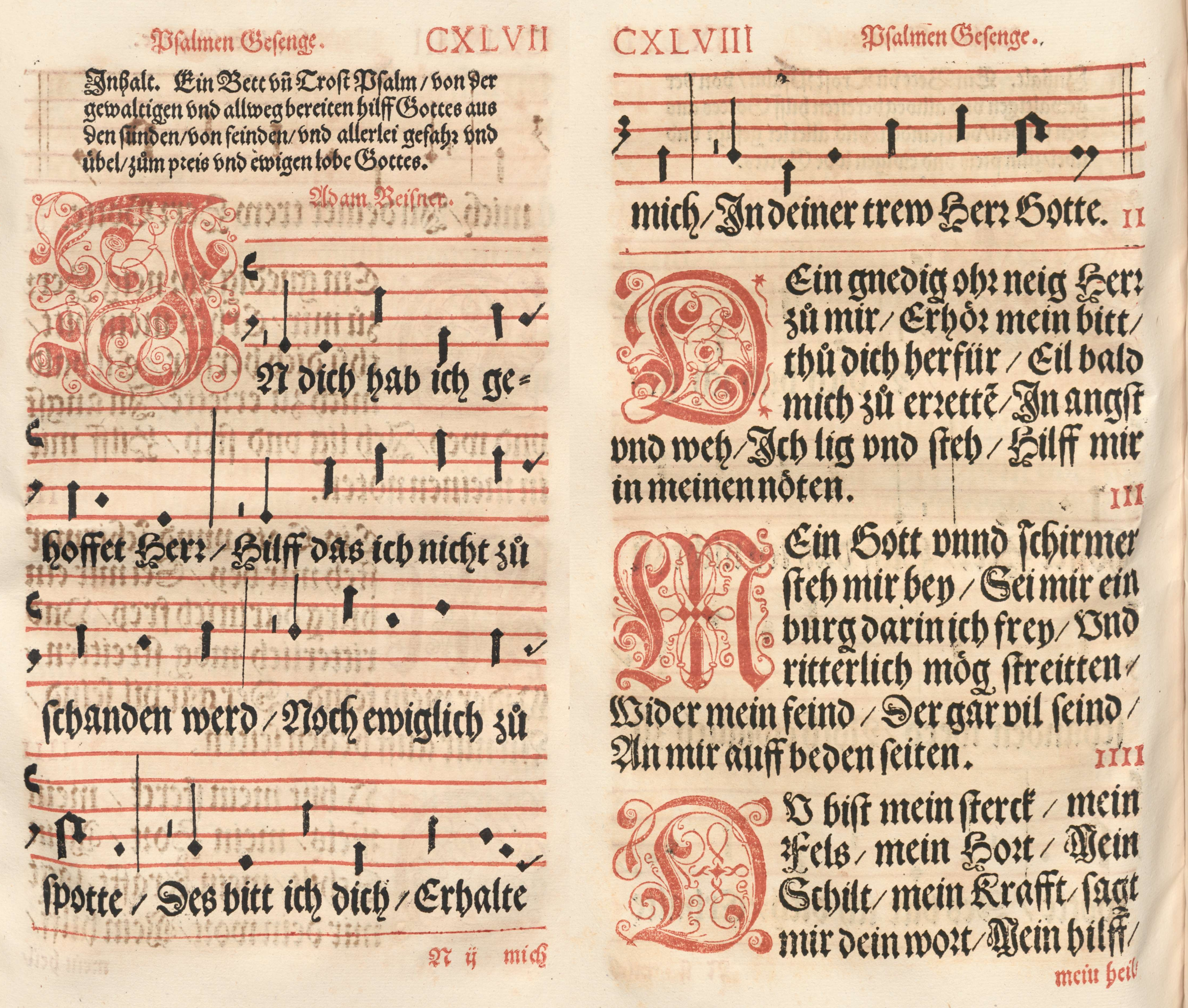
Melody and text of hymn from Das Gros Kirchen Gesangbuch, Strasbourg 1560

The text of the hymn is derived from the first six lines of Psalm 31 and was associated with two different melodies, in major and minor keys. The hymn tune in the major key was used many times by Bach, most notably in the funeral cantata BWV 106, the Christmas Oratorio and the St. Matthew Passion. BWV 640 is the only occasion he used the melody in the minor key, which can be traced back to an earlier reformation hymn tune for Christ ist erstanden and medieval plainsong for Christus iam resurrexit.

In Bach's chorale prelude BWV 640, the cantus firmus is in the soprano voice, several times held back for effect. Beneath it the two inner voices—often in thirds—and the pedal provide an accompaniment based on a motif derived from the melody, a falling three-note anapaest consisting of two semiquavers and a quaver. The motif is passed imitatively down through the voices, often developing into more flowing passages of semiquavers; the motif in the pedal has an added quaver and—punctuated by rests—is more fragmentary. The harmonies resulting from the combined voices produce a hymn-like effect. Schweitzer (1905) described the anapaest as a "joy" motif; to Hermann Keller it symbolised "constancy". For Williams (2003), the angular motifs and richer subdued textures in the lower registers are consonant with the "firm hope" of the text, in contrast to more animated evocations of joy.

- BWV 641 Wenn wir in höchsten Nöten sein [When we are in the greatest distress] a 2 Clav. et Ped.

MIDI rendition

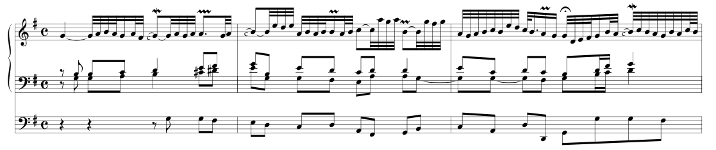

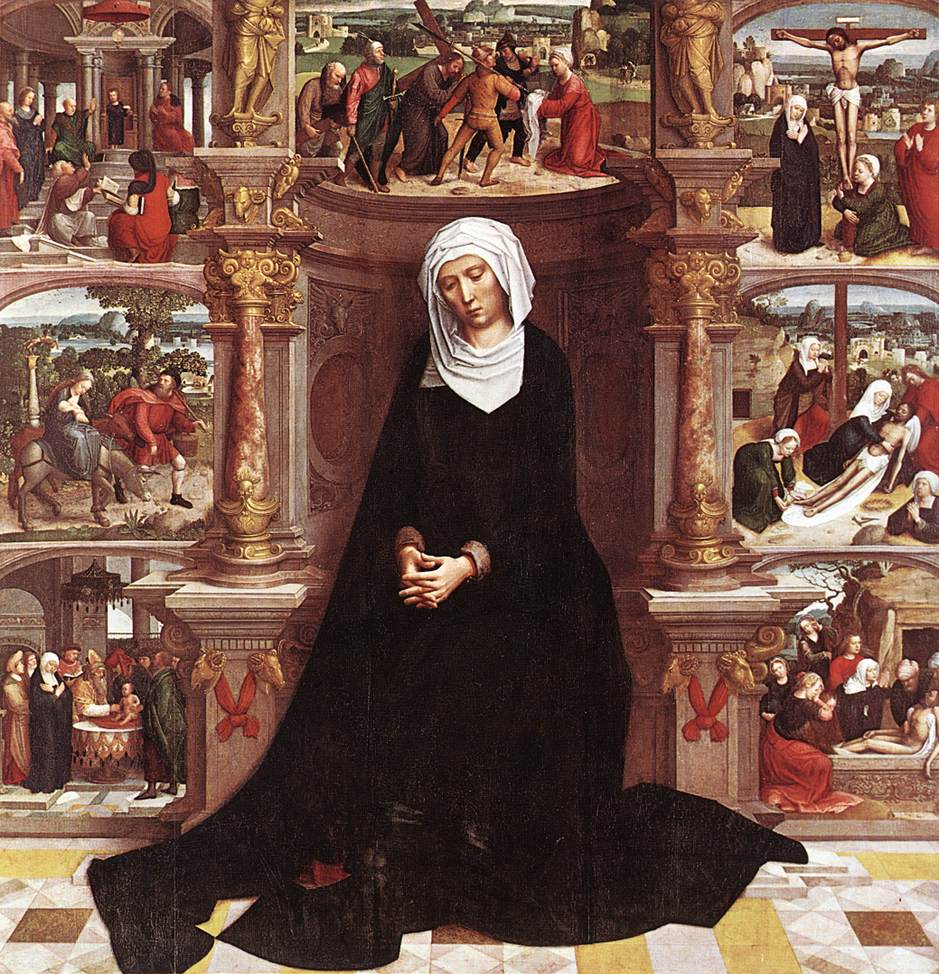
Adriaen Isenbrandt, Our Lady of the Seven Sorrows

Below are the first two verses of the hymn of Paul Eber with the English translation of Catherine Winkworth.

Wenn wir in höchsten Nöten sein und wissen nicht, wo aus noch ein, und finden weder Hilf' noch Rat, ob wir gleich sorgen früh und spat: ∘∘∘ So ist dies unser Trost allein, daß wir zusammen insgemein dich rufen an, o treuer Gott, um Rettung aus der Angst und Not.	When in the hour of utmost need We know not where to look for aid, When days and nights of anxious thought Nor help nor counsel yet have brought, ∘∘∘ Then this our comfort is alone, That we may meet before Thy throne, And cry, O faithful God, to Thee, For rescue from our misery.

The cantus firmus of this ornamental chorale prelude was written by Louis Bourgeois in 1543. It was used again the last of the Great Eighteen Chorale Preludes, BWV 668. The accompaniment in the two middle voices, often in parallel sixths, and the pedal is derived from the first four notes of the melody. The highly ornate ornamentation is rare amongst Bach's chorale preludes, the only comparable example being BWV 662 from the Great Eighteen. The vocal ornamentation and portamento appoggiaturas of the melody are French in style. Coloratura passages lead into the unadorned notes of the cantus firmus. Williams (2003) describes this musical device, used also in BWV 622 and BWV 639, as a means of conveying "a particular kind of touching, inexpressible expressiveness". The prelude has an intimate charm: as Albert Schweitzer commented, the soprano part flows "like a divine song of consolation, and in a wonderful final cadence seems to silence and compose the other parts."

- BWV 642 Wer nur den lieben Gott läßt walten [He who allows dear God to lead him]

MIDI rendition

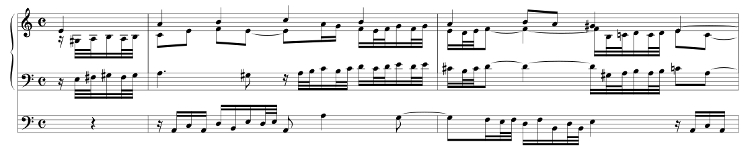

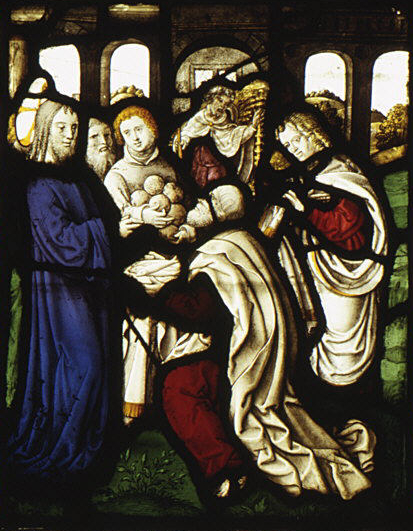
Miracle of the Loaves and Fishes, early 16th-century Flemish stained glass

Below are the first and last verses of the hymn Wer nur den lieben Gott läßt walten of Georg Neumark with the English translation of Catherine Winkworth.

Wer nur den lieben Gott läßt walten und hoffet auf ihn allezeit, den wird er wunderlich erhalten in allem Kreuz und Traurigkeit. Wer Gott, dem Allerhöchsten, traut, der hat auf keinen Sand gebaut. ∘∘∘ Sing, bet und geh auf Gottes Wegen, verricht das Deine nur getreu und trau des Himmels reichem Segen, so wird er bei dir werden neu; denn welcher sine Zuversicht auf Gott setzt, den verläßt er nicht.	If thou but suffer God to guide thee, And hope in Him through all thy ways, He'll give thee strength, whate'er betide thee. And bear thee through the evil days. Who trusts in God's unchanging love Builds on the rock that nought can move. ∘∘∘ Sing, pray, and keep His ways unswerving. So do thine own part faithfully. And trust His word; though undeserving, Thou yet shalt find it true for thee — God never yet forsook at need The soul that trusted Him indeed.

The melody was also composed by Neumark: it and the text were first published in his hymn book of 1657. The hymn tune was later set to other words, notably "Wer weiß, wie nahe mir mein Ende" ("Who knows how near is my end?"). Neumark originally wrote the melody in 3/2 time. Bach, however, like Walther, Böhm and Krebs, generally preferred a version in 4/4 time for his fourteen settings in chorale preludes and cantatas: it appears in cantatas BWV 21, BWV 27, BWV 84, BWV 88, BWV 93, BWV 166, BWV 179 and BWV 197, with words taken from one or other of the two hymn texts. In the chorale prelude BWV 642, the unadorned cantus firmus in 4/4 time is in the soprano voice. The two inner voices, often in thirds, are built on a motif made up of two short beats followed by a long beat—an anapaest—often used by Bach to signify joy (for example in BWV 602, 605, 615, 616, 618, 621, 623, 627, 629, 637 and 640). The pedal has a walking bass which also partly incorporates the joy motif in its responses to the inner voices. For Schweitzer (1905) the accompaniment symbolised "the joyful feeling of confidence in God's goodness." BWV 642 has similarities with the earlier chorale prelude BWV 690 from the Kirnberger collection, with the same affekt of a delayed entry in the second half of the cantus firmus. The compositional structure for all four voices in BWV 642 is close to that of BWV 643.

- BWV 643 Alle Menschen müssen sterben [All mankind must die]

MIDI rendition

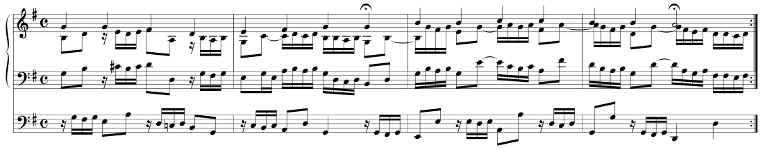

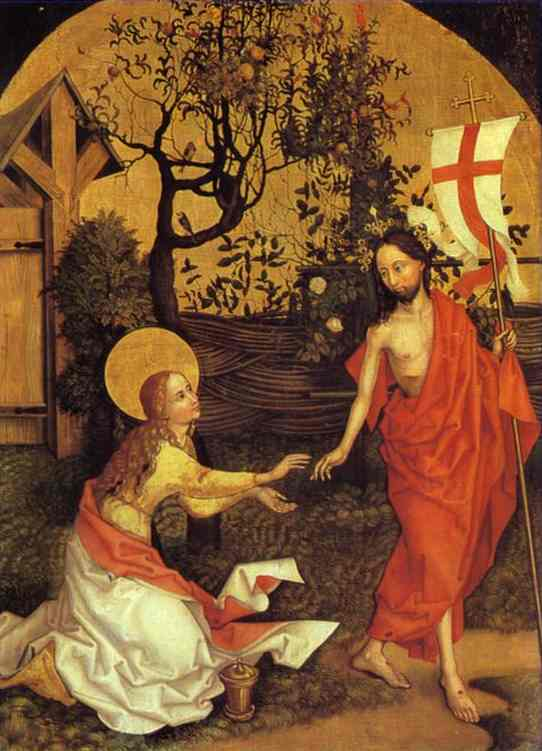
Martin Schongauer, Noli me tangere

Below are the first and last two verses of the funeral hymn of Johann Georg Albinus with the English translation of Catherine Winkworth.

Alle Menschen müßen sterben, alles Fleisch vergeht wie Heu; was da lebet, muß verderben, soll es anders werden neu. Dieser Leib, der muß verwesen, wenn er anders soll genesen zu der großen Herrlichkeit, die den Frommen ist bereit. ∘∘∘ O Jerusalem, du Schöne, ach, wie helle glänzest du! Ach, wie lieblich Lobgetöne hört man da in sanfter Ruh'! O der großen Freud' und Wonne! Jetzund gehet auf die Sonne, jetzund gehet an der Tag, der kein Ende nehmen mag. ∘∘∘ Ach, ich habe schon erblicket diese große Herrlichkeit! Jetzund werd' ich schön geschmücket mit dem weißen Himmelskleid und der goldnen Ehrenkrone, stehe da vor Gottes Throne, schaue solche Fruede an, die kein Ende nehmen kann.	Hark! a voice saith, All are mortal, Yea, all flesh must fade as grass, Only through Death's gloomy portal To a better life ye pass, And this body, formed of clay, Here must languish and decay. Ere it rise in glorious might, Fit to dwell with saints in light. ∘∘∘ O Jerusalem, how clearly Dost thou shine, thou city fair! Lo ! I hear the tones more nearly Ever sweetly sounding there! Oh what peace and joy hast thou! Lo the sun is rising now, And the breaking day I see That shall never end for me! ∘∘∘ Yea, I see what here was told me. See that wondrous glory shine. Feel the spotless robes enfold me. Know a golden crown is mine; So before the throne I stand. One amid that glorious band, Gazing on that joy for aye That shall never pass away!

BWV 643 is one of the most perfect examples of Bach's Orgelbüchlein style. A mood of ecstasy permeates this chorale prelude, a funeral hymn reflecting the theme of heavenly joy. The simple cantus firmus sings in crotchets (quarter notes) above an accompanying motif of three semiquavers (16th notes) followed by two quavers (eighth notes) that echoes between the two inner parts and the pedal. This figure is also found in the organ works of Georg Böhm and Daniel Vetter from the same era. Schweitzer (1905) describes its use by Bach as a motif of "beatific peace", commenting that "the melody of the hymn that speaks of the inevitability of death is thus enveloped in a motif that is lit up by the coming glory." Despite the harmonious thirds and sixths in the inner parts, the second semiquaver of the motif produces a momentary dissonance that is instantly resolved, again contributing to the mood of joy tinged by sadness. As Spitta (1899) comments, "What tender melancholy lurks in the chorale, Alle Menschen müßen sterben, what an indescribable expressiveness, for instance, arises in the last bar from the false relation between c♯ and c', and the almost imperceptible ornamentation of the melody!"

- BWV 644 Ach wie nichtig, ach wie flüchtig [Oh how fleeting, oh how feckless]

MIDI rendition

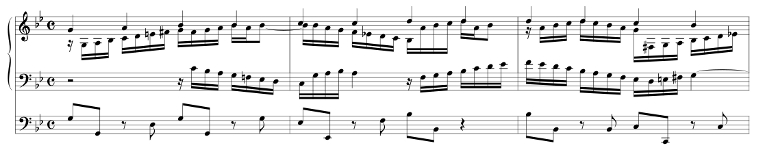

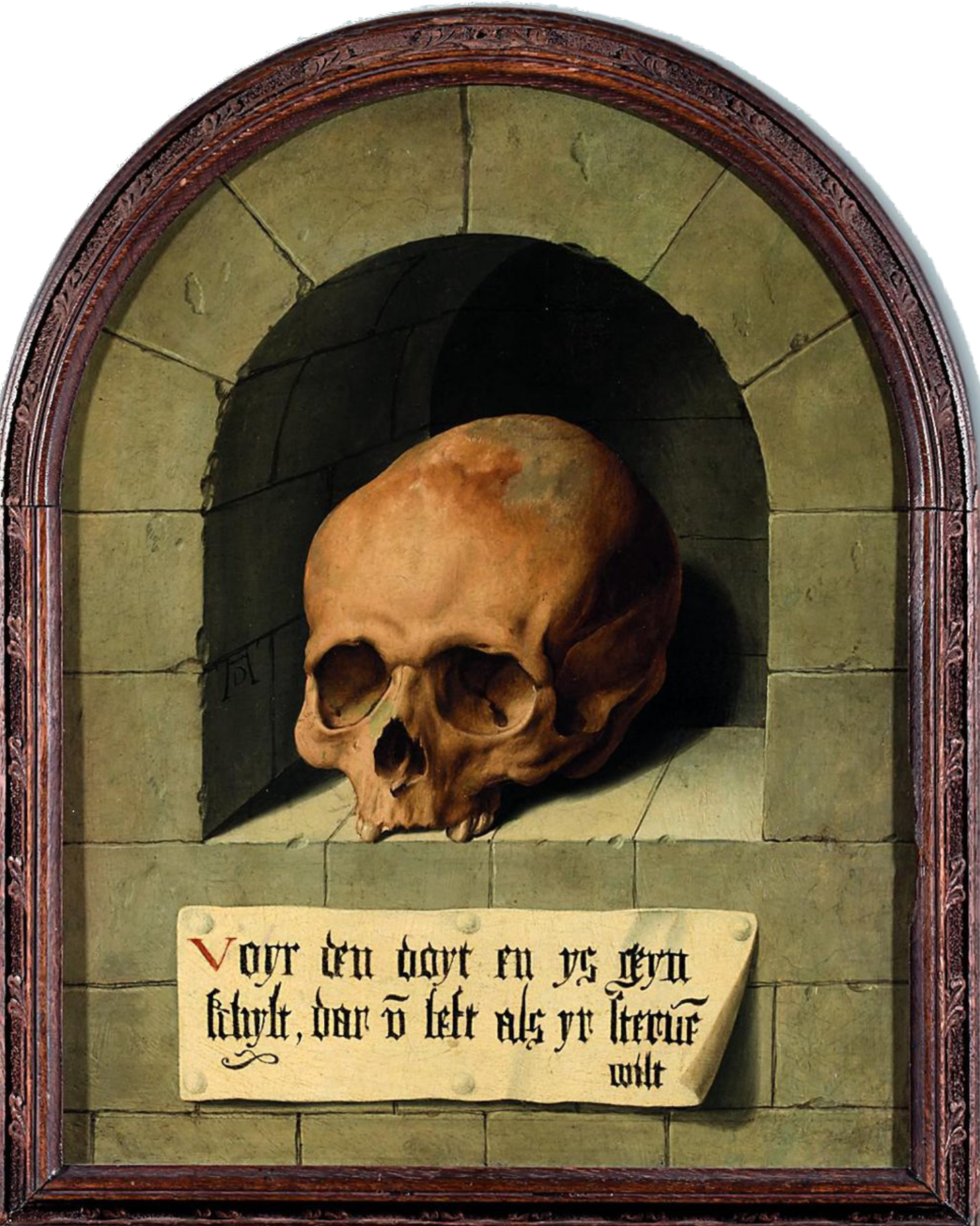
Bartholomäus Bruyn, Memento Mori

Below are the first and last verses of Michael Franck's 1652 Lutheran hymn Ach wie flüchtig, ach wie nichtig with the English translation of Sir John Bowring.

Ach wie flüchtig, ach wie nichtig ist der Menschen Leben! Wie Ein Nebel bald enstehet und auch wie der bald vergehet so ist unser Leben sehet! ∘∘∘ Ach wie nichtig, ach wie flüchtig sind der Menschen Sachen! Alles, alles was wir sehen, das muß fallen und vergehen. Wer Gott fürcht', wird ewig stehen.	O how cheating, O how fleeting, Is our earthly being! 'Tis a mist in wintry weather, Gathered in an hour together, And as soon dispersed in ether. ∘∘∘ O how fleeting, O how cheating, All—yes! all that's earthly! Everything is fading, flying, Man is mortal, earth is dying. Christian! live on Heaven relying.

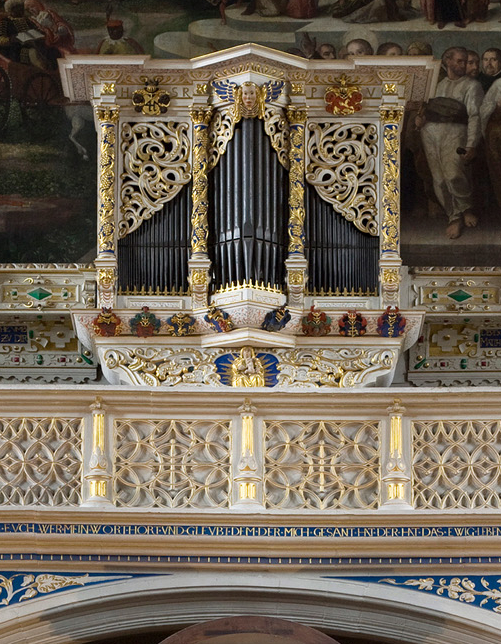
Small organ in the Marienkirche in Halle which Bach played in 1713 in an audition for organist and subsequently evaluated in 1716

The verses of Franck's hymn alternate the order of the words nichtig and flüchtig in their opening lines. Bach's title conforms to a later 1681 hymnbook from Weimar which inverted the order throughout. The chorale prelude is in four voices for single manual with pedals. The cantus firmus in the soprano voice is a simple form of the hymn tune in crotchets. The accompaniment, intricately crafted from two separate motifs in the inner voices and in the pedal, is a particularly fine illustration of Bach's compositional method in the Orgelbüchlein. The motif in the pedal is a constant three-note quaver figure, with octave leaps punctuated by frequent rests. Above this bass, the inner voices weave a continuous pattern of descending and ascending scales in semiquavers, constantly varying, sometimes moving in the same direction and sometimes in contrary motion. This texture of flowing scales over a "quasi-pizzicato" bass captures the theme of the hymn: it is a reflection on the transitory nature of human existence, likened to a mist "gathered in an hour together, and soon dispersed." Similar semiquaver figures had been used in other contemporary settings of this hymn, for example in a set of variations by Böhm

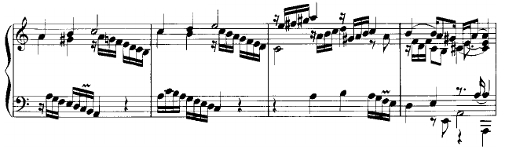
4th variation of Georg Böhm's partita on Ach wie nichtig

and in the first chorus of Bach's cantata BWV 26, but without conveying the same effect of quiet reflection. To Spitta (1899) the scales "hurry by like misty ghosts." Hermann Keller saw the bass motif as representing "the futility of human existence". Others have suggested that the rests in the pedal part might symbolise the nothingness of ach wie nichtig. Exceptionally Bach scored the final chord of this nebulous piece without pedal. A similar device has been used by Bach for the word inanes ("empty") in the ninth movement of his Magnificat. Stinson (1999) also sees similarities with Bach's omission of a bass part in Wie zittern und wanken from cantata BWV 105, an aria concerned with the uncertainties in the life of a sinner.

== Arrangements ==
BWV 639 was used in Andrei Tarkovsky's 1972 film Solaris, mainly in the original version and also in arrangement.

A close variant of BWV 639 is catalogued as BWV Anh. 73, an expanded arrangement for organ, attributed to the composer's son C.P.E. Bach.

== Reception ==
The Orgelbüchlein was originally passed from teacher to student and was not published in its entirety until Felix Mendelssohn edited an edition. Notable editions have been made by Robert Clark and John David Peterson, Quentin Faulkner, Albert Riemenschneider, and Albert Schweitzer.

== Transcriptions ==
Arranger and instrumentation	Published title	Original chorale prelude by BWV number
Johann Nepomuk Schelble, piano duet	Var. Choraele fürs P.f. zu 4 Haenden eingerichtet, Dunst, undated	BWV 620a, 614, 622
Adolph Bernhard Marx, piano	Anzahl aus Sebastian Bach's Kompositionen, zur ersten Bekanntschaft mit dem Meister am Pianoforte, Challier, 1844	BWV 614, 619
Ferruccio Busoni, piano	Orgelchoralvorspiele von Johann Sebastian Bach: Auf das Pianoforte im Kammerstyl übertragen, 2 vols, Breitkopf & Härtel, 1898	BWV 615, 617, 637, 639
Max Reger, piano	Ausgewählte Choralvorspiele von Joh. Seb. Bach: Für Klavier zu 2 Händen übertragen, Universal Edition, 1900.	BWV 614, 622, 637, 639, 644
Bernhard Friedrich Richter, piano duet	Joh. Seb. Bachs Werke, Nach der Ausgabe der Bachgesellschaft. Orgelbüchlein: 46 kürzere Choralbearbaitungen für Klavier zu vier Händen, Breitkopf & Härtel, 1902.	BWV 599-644
Max Reger, string orchestra	Johann Sebastian Bach: "O Mensch, bewein dein Sünde gross." Aria nach dem Choralvorspiel für Streichorchester bearbeitet, Breitkopf & Härtel, 1915.	BWV 622
Max Reger, violin and organ	Album für Violine mit Orgelbegleitung, Breitkopf & Härtel, 1915	BWV 622
Leopold Stokowski, orchestra	Arrangements of several of the chorale preludes for the Philadelphia Orchestra, 1916–1926	BWV 599, 639
Walter Rummel, piano	Adaptations, Ser. 1 (J.S. Bach), J. & W. Chester, 1922	BWV 614
Vittorio Gui, orchestra	Due corale di J.S. Bach. Trascritti dall' organo per orchestra, Universal Edition, 1925.	BWV 615, 622
Harry Hodge, string orchestra	Johann Sebastian Bach: organ choral preludes arranged for strings, Patterson's Publications, 1926	BWV 600, 639
William Murdoch, piano	Johann Sebastian Bach: organ choral preludes arranged for pianoforte, Schott, 1928	BWV 622, 639
Marco Enrico Bossi, violin or viola and organ	Johann Sebastian Bach: "O Mensch, bewein dein Sünde gross." Edition Euterpe, 1929.	BWV 622
Arthur Bliss, piano	A Bach Book for Harriet Cohen: Transcriptions for Pianoforte from the works of J.S. Bach, Oxford University Press, 1932	BWV 614
Herbert Howells, piano	A Bach Book for Harriet Cohen: Transcriptions for Pianoforte from the works of J.S. Bach, Oxford University Press, 1932	BWV 622
Constant Lambert, piano	A Bach Book for Harriet Cohen: Transcriptions for Pianoforte from the works of J.S. Bach, Oxford University Press, 1932	BWV 605
Harry S. Hirsch, oboe, clarinet, bassoon	Johann Sebastian Bach: I Call Upon Thy Name O Jesus, Carl Fischer, 1934	BWV 639
Alexander Kelberine, piano	Joh. Seb. Bach: Organ Chorale Prelude, "Ich ruf' zu dir, Herr Jesu Christ", Elkan-Vogel, 1934	BWV 639
Mabel Wood-Hill, string quartet/orchestra	J.S. Bach: Chorale Preludes, R.D. Roe, 1935	BWV 615, 619, 623
Eric DeLamarter, string orchestra	J.S. Bach: Chorale Prelude Das alte Jahr vergangen ist, Ricordi, 1940	BWV 614
Amedeo de Filippi, string quartet/orchestra	Johann Sebastian Bach: Blessed Jesus, We Are Here (Chorale Prelude), Concord 1940	BWV 633
Boris Goldovsky, 2 pianos	J.S. Bach: Oh, How Fleeting, J. Fischer and Bro., 1940	BWV 644
Felix Guenther, piano	Johann Sebastian Bach: 24 chorale preludes compiled and arranged for piano, solo, Edward B. Marks, 1942	BWV 814, 615, 623, 639
Max Reger, piano	Johann Sebastian Bach: drei Orgelchoralvorspiele, für Klavier gearbeitet, Breitkopf & Härtel, 1943	BWV 606, 638
Charles Henry Stuart Duncan, 2 pianos	Johann Sebastian Bach: eleven chorale preludes from the little organ book, G. Schirmer, 1949	BWV 600, 601, 608, 609, 610, 625, 627, 633, 636, 637, 643
Anne Hull, 2 pianos	Johann Sebastian Bach: Chorale Prelude In dir ist Freude, Carl Fischer, 1950	BWV 615
Wilhelm Kempff, piano	Johann Sebastian Bach: Ich ruf' zu dir, Herr Jesu Christ (Choralvorspiel), Bote & Bock, 1954	BWV 639
György Kurtág, 2 pianos	Transcriptions from Machaut to J.S. Bach, Editio Musica Budapest, 1985	BWV 611, 618, 619, 637, 643, 644
Harrison Birtwistle, soprano, clarinet in A, basset horn, bass clarinet	Five Chorale Preludes, Universal Edition, 1975.	BWV 637, 620, 614 (and BWV 691 and 728)
Harrison Birtwistle, chamber ensemble	Bach Measures, Boosey and Hawkes, 1996	BWV 599, 639, 617, 619, 628, 615, 622, 637

== Discography ==
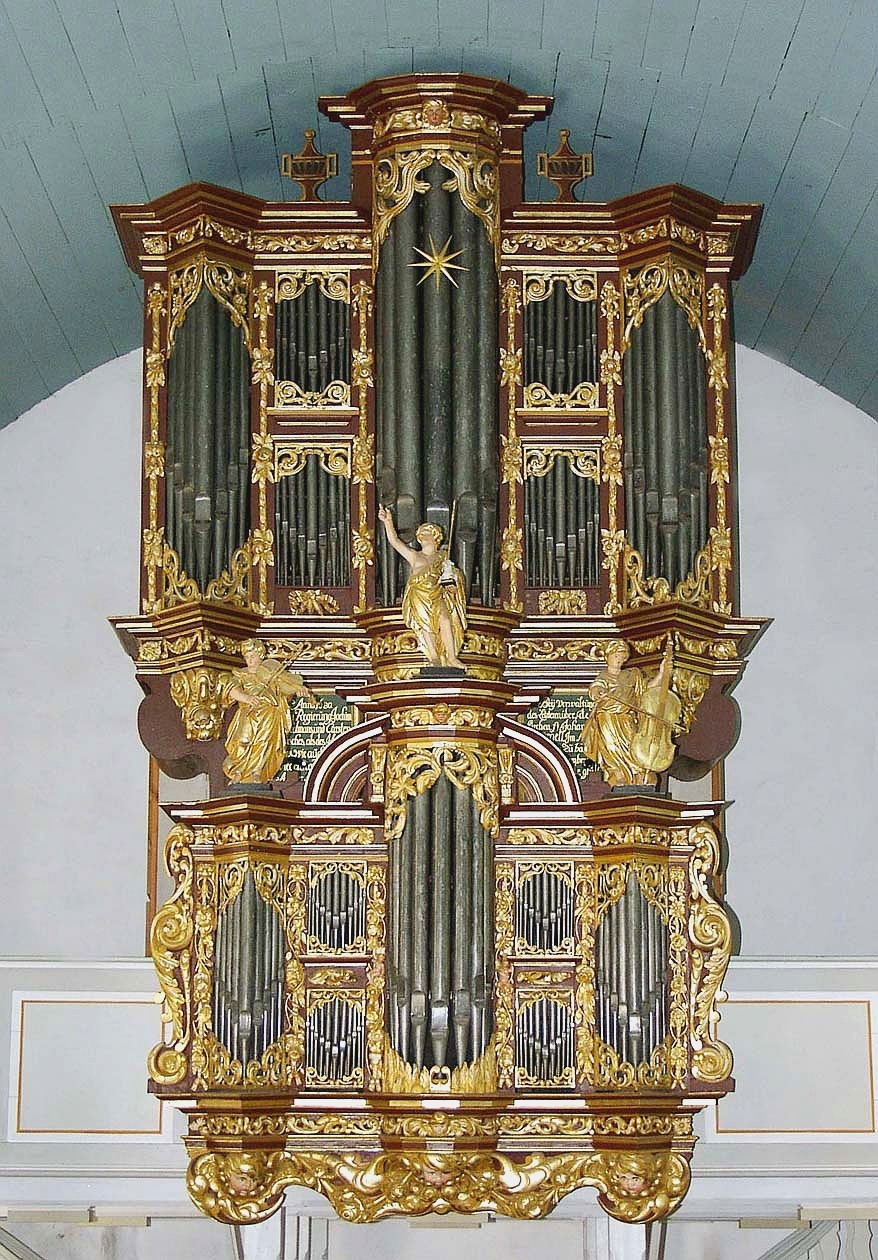
Arp Schnitger organ in Cappel

- Helmut Walcha, Schnitger organ, St Peter and St Paul, Cappel, Lower Saxony (Deutsche Grammophon)
- Ton Koopman, Riepp organ, Ottobeuren Abbey (Teldec 214662)
- Marie-Claire Alain, Silbermann organ, Freiberg Cathedral (Erato 4509-96759-2)
- André Isoir, Ahrend organ in Cantate Domino evangelical church, Frankfurt (Calliope 9711)
- Bernard Foccroulle, Schott organ in the Klosterkirche, Muri Abbey (Ricercar)
- Peter Hurford, organs of Church of Our Lady of Sorrows, Toronto and St Catharine's College, Cambridge (Decca 443485-2) (with Choir of St John's College, Cambridge singing Walter Emery's 1969 harmonisations of chorales)
- Simon Preston, organ in Sorø Academy, Denmark (Deutsche Grammophon)
- Francesco Cera, organ in Church of S. Maria Assunta, Giubasco, Switzerland, (Brillant 94639) (with Swiss Radiotelevision Choir singing each chorale)
- René Saorgin, organ in Saint-Pierre de Luxeuil Cathedral, France (Harmonia Mundi HMX 2951215)
- Anton Heiller, 1964 Metzler organ in Nestal, Switzerland (Vanguard LPs VCS-10026 & VCS-10027; 1968)

== See also ==
- List of compositions by Johann Sebastian Bach
- Neumeister Chorales
- Schübler Chorales
- Great Eighteen Chorale Preludes
- Clavier-Übung III
- Canonic Variations
- Ich ruf zu dir, Herr Jesu Christ, BWV 177

== Notes ==
=== Sources ===
- Anon. (n.d.). "Orgelbüchlein Project".
- Benitez, Vincent P. (1987). "Musical-rhetorical figures in the Orgelbüchlein of J. S. Bach". Bach. 18 (1): 3–21. JSTOR 41640282.
- Boyd, Malcolm (2000), Bach, Master musicians (3rd ed.), Oxford University Press, ISBN 0-19-514222-5
- Chailley, Jacques (1974), Les chorales pour orgues de J.-S. Bach, Leduc, ISBN 2856890113
- Clark, Robert; Peterson, John David, eds. (1984), Orgelbüchlein, Concordia
- Geck, Martin (2005), Bach, London: Haus Publishing, ISBN 1-904341-16-0
- Emery, Walter (October 1938), "The Orgelbuchlein: Some Textual Matters: I. Readings of the tablature in 'Christus, der uns selig macht'", The Musical Times, 79 (1148): 770–771, doi:10.2307/923787, JSTOR 923787
- Haupt, Hartmut (2000), Stauffer, George B.; May, Ernest (eds.), Bach's organs in Thuringia, J. S. Bach as Organist: His Instruments, Music, and Performance Practices, Indiana University Press, pp. 25–30, ISBN 0-253-21386-X
- Honders, A. Casper (1988), "Het 'Orgel-Büchlein' gehoord vanuit de teksten", in Brouwer, Frans (ed.), Bachs 'Orgel-Büchlein' in nieuw perspectief; Studies over Bachs 'Orgel-Buchlein'. Verslag van het internationale Bach-Congres van de Nederlandse Organistenvereniging, Groningen 1985, KerkMLiturg, vol. 1, Utrecht, Hogeschool voor de Kunsten, pp. 21–51
- Kielian-Gilbert, Marianne (2006), "Inventing a Melody with Harmony: Tonal Potential and Bach's "Das alte Jahr vergangen ist"" (PDF), Journal of Music Theory, 50: 77–101, doi:10.1215/00222909-2008-008
- Keller, Hermann (1948), The organ works of Bach: a contribution to their history, form, interpretation and performance (transl. Helen Hewitt, 1967), C.F. Peters
- Renwick, William (1995), Analyzing Fugue: A Schenkerian Approach, Pendragon Press, ISBN 0945193521
- Renwick, W. (2006), "Of Time and Eternity: Reflections on "Das alte Jahr vergangen ist"" (PDF), Journal of Music Theory, 50: 65–76, doi:10.1215/00222909-2008-007
- Richards, Annette; Yearsley, David (2008), Carl Philipp Emanuel Bach: Organ Works (PDF), Packard Humanities Institute, ISBN 978-1-933280-33-2, archived from the original (PDF) on 2016-08-04
- Rose, Stephen (2008), "Review of The Creative Development of Johann Sebastian Bach, i: 1695–1717. Music to Delight the Spirit. By Richard D. P. Jones", Music & Letters, 89: 618–620, doi:10.1093/ml/gcm124
- Schweitzer, Albert (1905), J.S.Bach le musicien-poète, Breitkopf & Härtel
- Schweitzer, Albert (1911a), J.S.Bach, Volume I, Breitkopf & Härtel
- Schweitzer, Albert (1911b), J.S.Bach, Volume II, Breitkopf & Härtel
- Snyder, Kerala (1987), Dieterich Buxtehude: Organist in Lübeck, Schirmer Books, ISBN 0-02-873080-1
- Spitta, Philipp (1899), Johann Sebastian Bach: his work and influence in the music of Germany, Volume I (transl. Clara Bell & J.A. Fuller Maitland), Novello
- Stinson, Russell (1999), Bach: the Orgelbüchlein, Oxford University Press, ISBN 978-0-19-386214-2
- Stinson, Russell (2006), The reception of Bach's organ works from Mendelssohn to Brahms, Oxford University Press, ISBN 0-19-517109-8
- Temperley, David (2006), "Key Structure in "Das alte Jahr vergangen ist"" (PDF), Journal of Music Theory, 50: 103–110, doi:10.1215/00222909-2008-009
- Terry, Charles Sanford (1921), Bach's Chorals, vol. III, Cambridge University Press
- Williams, Peter (1985), The Organ Music of J.S. Bach, Volume II: BWV 599–771, etc., Cambridge Studies in Music, Cambridge University Press, ISBN 0-521-31700-2
- Williams, Peter (2003), The Organ Music of J. S. Bach (2nd ed.), Cambridge University Press, pp. 227–316, ISBN 0-521-89115-9
- Wolff, Christoph (1991), Bach: essays on his life and music, Harvard University Press, pp. 297–305, ISBN 0-674-05926-3, Chapter 22. "Chronology and style in the early works: a background for the Orgelbüchlein"
- Wollny, Peter; Maul, Michael (2008), "The Weimar Organ Tablature: Bach's Earliest Autographs" (PDF), Understanding Bach, 3: 67–74
