= Nun lasst uns den Leib begraben (disambiguation) =

"Nun lasst uns den Leib begraben" (or ...laßt...; ...lasset...) is a Lutheran hymn for funerals. It may also refer to

- Nun lasset uns den Leib begraben, BWV 1111, one of the Neumeister Chorales by Johann Sebastian Bach
- "Nun laßt uns den Leib begraben", D 168 (Schubert) a part song for mixed choir and piano by Franz Schubert
