= Tobie (ship) =

English merchant ship, sunk 1593

History

England
- Name: Tobie
- Owner: M. Richard Staper
- Homeport: London
- Fate: Wrecked near Cape Spartel, 1593

General characteristics
- Tons burthen: 250 tons
- Propulsion: Sail; Wind
- Crew: 50 men

Tobie was an English merchant ship that sank in 1593 and was chiefly notable for the ordeal its crew endured.

== Background ==
The final voyage of the Tobie took place in a period when England was heavily engaged in trade with the Levant. In recent years, England had sent an ambassador and merchant to the court in Istanbul to establish trade relations and formed the Levant Company.

Tobie is thought to have been carrying tin and wool, two of England's major exports at the time. Specie may have also been part of the cargo. The cargo's value was estimated at 11 or 12 thousand pounds sterling.

== Final voyage ==
On August 16, 1593, Tobie set sail from London headed for Zakinthos and Patras in Greece via Livorno. For the ship's master, George Goodlay, this was his first voyage as master on a Levant route. Writer Richard Hakluyt adopted a dim view of him, lamenting "being a young man, and one which never tooke charge before for those parts, was very proud of that charge which he was litle able to discharge, neither would take any counsel of any of his company, but did as he thought best himselfe".

Tobie proceeded down the English Channel and called at Portsmouth to take on a load of wheat. On October 6, it departed the Isle of Wight, where conditions were described as fair, and twelve days later approached the Strait of Gibraltar, where foul weather threatened to run the ship aground, forcing the crew to sail back out to sea.

On the night of October 19, an attempt was made to transit the strait. Still, Goodlay had incorrectly calculated their position, and Tobie ran aground approximately an hour and a half before dawn. Tobie was carrying sail at the time, regarded as an ill-advised action on an unfamiliar coast at night. The ship's estimated position was 12 miles (19 km) south of Cape Spartel.

Goodlay immediately accepted the responsibility to his crew, stating, "I pray you forgive me; for this is my fault and no mans else." They wished to cut the main mast to reduce the strain on the ship's timbers, but Goodlay sought to launch a boat instead. However, upon learning of the depth of the water in the hold, he assented to their plan. This action was then precluded by the ship's breaking in two.

The crew began to sing Psalm 12 as they desperately clung to the mast, which collapsed before the end of the fourth verse, flinging the men into the water. Of the ship's crew of 50, 38 drowned before being able to reach the shore about a quarter of a mile (400 m) away. The few survivors avoided death by clinging to flotsam or swimming. Goodlay and his mate, William Palmer, were among the dead. The ship's carpenter, William Williams, was the sole surviving officer.

== Castaways ==
Once on land, the 12 survivors found no signs of habitation aside from "wilde beasts" and the remains of houses burned down by the Portuguese. The men had nothing in the way of nourishment aside from water and roots of wild dates. At the time, the Maghreb was still home to lions, and the crew sought shelter in olive trees during the night to avoid them.

They traveled until 3 pm on the following afternoon, scaled a mountain, where they recognized Cape Spartel and proceeded until they came upon a row of hedges made of cane. From this vantage, they witnessed an army of Moors engaged in a battle with the Spanish and/or Portuguese and resolved to show themselves to the victors, who were the Moors.

The soldiers violently charged them with javelins but, at the last second, merely struck them with the flats of their weapons. The Moors presumed them to be Spaniards, but through an Italian interpreter, they explained their origin and circumstances. The Moorish leader had them strip-searched, seized their gold and pearls worth about 200 pounds sterling, and provided bread and additional water. The Moors brought them back to the wreck, some 16 miles distant. During the trek, they were beaten if they moved too slowly and were forced to carry their captors' equipment. After seven days, the Moors had salvaged what was left of the wreck, and they brought the survivors to Ksar el Kebir.

There, they were imprisoned with Spanish captives and French survivors of another shipwreck. A week later, 900 soldiers led them to the capital; during the journey, they were treated somewhat better, provided with tents, and could find ample fresh water supplies along the way. Upon arriving in the capital, they appeared before a royal court that had them imprisoned for 15 days while a ransom was arranged. The community of English merchants paid the ransom, which was "700 ounces", where each ounce was equivalent to two shillings. After being released, they traveled overland with the merchants for many weeks and set sail from the continent on about March 20 on four ships over several days.

=== Survivors ===
- Richard Johnson
- William Williams (carpenter)
- John Durham
- Abraham Rouse
- John Matthewes
- Thomas Henmore
- John Silvester
- Thomas Whiting
- William Church
- John Fox
- George Hancock (died in captivity)
- Robert Swancon (died on journey home)
