= Vater unser im Himmelreich =

1538 Lutheran hymn in German by Martin Luther

- Hymn by Martin Luther
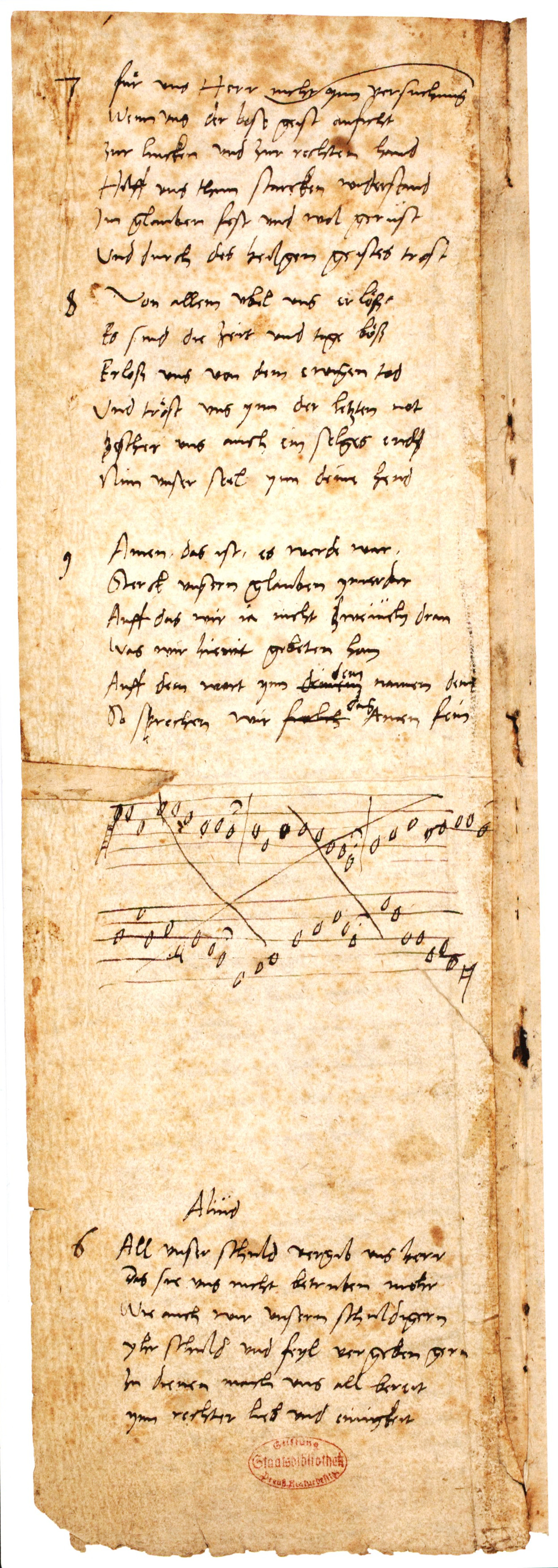
- Second page of the autograph with the only notes extant in Luther's handwriting
- English: Our Father in Heaven
- Catalogue: Zahn 2561
- Text: by Martin Luther
- Language: German
- Based on: The Lord's Prayer
- Published: 1538

"Vater unser im Himmelreich" (Our Father in Heaven) is a Lutheran hymn in German by Martin Luther. He wrote the paraphrase of the Lord's Prayer in 1538, corresponding to his explanation of the prayer in his Kleiner Katechismus (Small Catechism). He dedicated one stanza to each of the seven petitions and framed it with an opening and a closing stanza, each stanza in six lines. Luther revised the text several times, as extant manuscript show, concerned to clarify and improve it. He chose and possibly adapted an older anonymous melody, which was possibly associated with secular text, after he had first selected a different one. Other hymn versions of the Lord's Prayer from the 16th and 20th-century have adopted the same tune, known as "Vater unser" and "Old 112th".

The hymn was published in Leipzig in 1539 in Valentin Schumann's hymnal Gesangbuch, with a title explaining "The Lord's Prayer briefly expounded and turned into metre". It was likely first published as a broadsheet.

The hymn was translated into English in several versions, for example "Our Father, Thou in Heaven Above" by Catherine Winkworth in 1863 and "Our Father, Lord of Heaven and Earth" by Henry J. de Jong in 1982. In the current German hymnal Evangelisches Gesangbuch (EG) it is number 344.

== Text ==
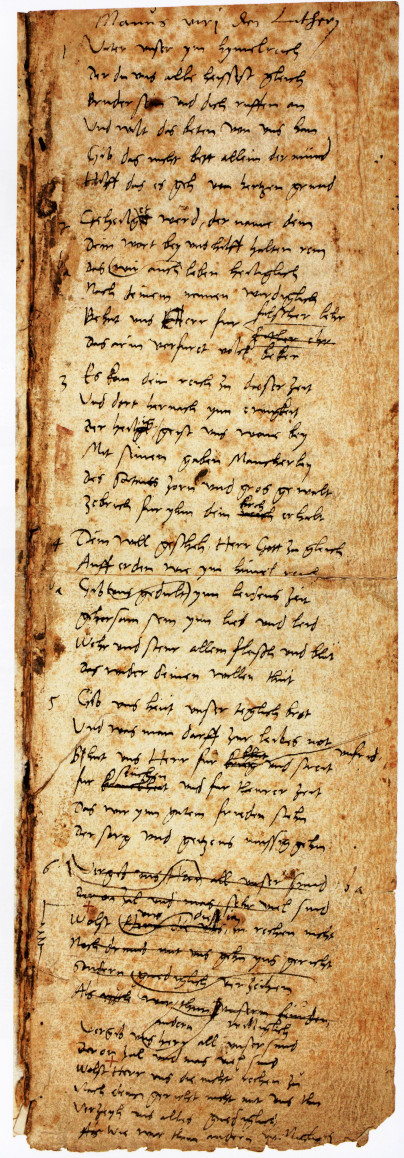
First page of the autograph

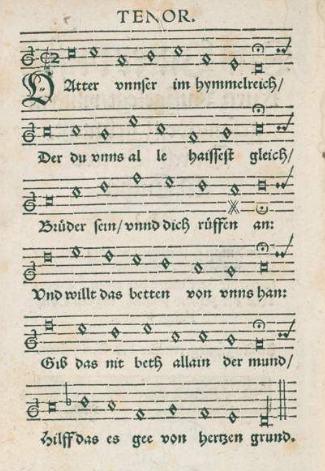
In a 1545 hymnal

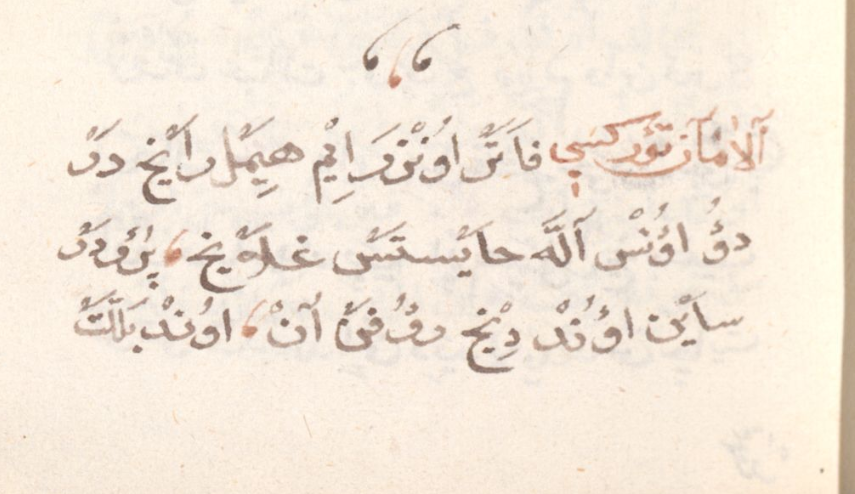
First lines in a late 16th century song collection from Ottoman Europe

Below is the German text from the 1539 Gesangbuch of Valentin Schumann with the English translation by George MacDonald.

1
Vater unser im Himmelreich,
Der du uns alle heißest gleich
Brüder sein und dich rufen an
Und willst das Beten von uns han,
Gibt, daß nicht bet allein der Mund,
Hilf, daß es geh von Herzensgrund.
2
Geheiligt werd der Name dein,
Dein Wort bei uns hilf halten rein,
Daß wir auch leben heiliglich
Nach deinem Namen würdiglich.
Behüt uns, Herr, vor falscher Lehr,
Das arm verführet Volk belehr.
3
Es kommt dein Reich zu dieser Zeit
Und dort hernach in Ewigkeit.
Der heilig Geist uns wohnet bei
Mit seinen Gaben mancherlei.
Des Satans Zorn und groß Gewalt
Zerbrich, vor ihm dein Kirch erhalt.
4
Dein Will gescheh, Herr Gott, zugleich
Auf Erden und im Himmelreich.
Gib uns Geduld in Leidenszeit,
Gehorsam sein in Lieb und Leid,
Wehr und steur allem Fleisch und Blut,
Das wider deinen Willen tut.
5
Gib uns heut unser täglich Brot
Und was man darf zur Leibesnot,
Bhüt uns, Herr, vor Unfried und Streit,
Vor Seuchen und vor teurer Zeit,
Daß wir in gutem Frieden stehn,
Der Sorg und Geizes müßig gehn.
6
All unser Schuld vergib uns, Herr,
Daß sie uns nicht betrüben mehr,
Wie wir auch unsern Schuldigern
Ihr Schuld und Fehl vergeben gern.
Zu dienen mach uns all bereit
In rechter Lieb und Einigkeit.
7
Führ uns, Herr, in Versuchung nicht,
Wenn uns der böse Geist anficht,
Zur linken und zur rechten Hand
Hilf uns tun starken Widerstand,
Im Glauben fest und wohlgerüst
Und durch des heilgen Geistes Trost.
8
Von allem Übel uns erlös,
Es sind die Zeit und Tage bös,
Erlös uns vom ewigen Tod
Und tröst uns in der letzten Not.
Bescher uns auch ein seligs End,
Nimm unser Seel in deine Händ.
9
Amen, das ist: Es werde wahr.
Stärk unsern Glauben immerdar,
Auf das wir ja nicht zweifeln dran,
Das wir hiemit gebeten han.
Auf dein Wort in dem Namen dein,
So sprechen wir das Amen fein.

Our Father in the heaven Who art,
Who tellest all of us in heart
Brothers to be, and on Thee call,
And wilt have prayer from us all,
Grant that the mouth not only pray,
From deepest heart oh help its way.

Hallowed be Thy name, O Lord;
Amongst us pure oh keep Thy word,
That we too may live holily.
And keep in Thy name worthily.
Defend us. Lord, from lying lore;
Thy poor misguided folk restore.

Thy kingdom come now here below,
And after, up there, evermo.
The Holy Ghost His temple hold
In us with graces manifold.
The devil's wrath and greatness strong
Crush, that he do Thy Church no wrong.

Thy will be done the same, Lord God,
On earth as in Thy high abode;
In pain give patience for relief,
Obedience in love and grief;
All flesh and blood keep off and check
That 'gainst Thy will makes a stiff neck.

Give us this day our daily bread,
And all that doth the body stead;
From strife and war, Lord, keep us free,
From sickness and from scarcity;
That we in happy peace may rest,
By care and greed all undistrest.

Forgive, Lord, all our trespasses,
That they no more may us distress.
As of our debtors we gladly let
Pass all the trespasses and debt.
To serve make us all ready be
In honest love and unity,

Into temptation lead us not.
When the evil spirit makes battle hot
Upon the right and the left hand.
Help us with vigour to withstand,
Firm in the faith, armed 'gainst a host,
Through comfort of the Holy Ghost,

From all that's evil free Thy sons —
The time, the days are wicked ones.
Deliver us from endless death;
Comfort us in our latest breath;
Grant us also a blessed end.
Our spirit take into Thy hand,

Amen! that is, let this come true!
Strengthen our faith ever anew,
That we may never be in doubt
Of that we here have prayed about.
In Thy name, trusting in Thy word.
We say a soft Amen, O Lord.

== Hymn tune ==
Below is the hymn tune from Valentin Schumann's Gesangbuch of 1539 (Zahn No. 2561).

In English-language publications, the tune has also appeared with various unrelated texts, and its use in English and Scottish Psalters as a setting for Psalm 112 has led to the tune being referred to as "Old 112th" in some hymnals. The original rhythm is also sometimes altered, as for example in a harmonisation by Johann Sebastian Bach:

== Use in musical compositions ==
Numerous composers used the hymn tune, some also the text. There are choral settings by Orlando di Lasso, Michael Praetorius and Samuel Scheidt. Johann Ulrich Steigleder composed 40 three-part variations on the hymn tune and published them as a Tabulaturbuch in Strasbourg in 1627. Amongst those who set it as a chorale prelude for organ are Michael Praetorius, Jacob Praetorius, Samuel Scheidt and Heinrich Scheidemann. Johann Pachelbel included a chorale prelude in his liturgical collection Erster Theil etlicher Choräle.

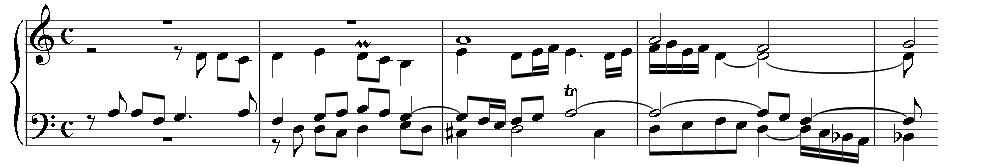
Pachelbel's Vater unser im Himmelreich

Dieterich Buxtehude set the hymn twice as a chorale prelude. The freely composed chorale prelude BuxWV 207 has three separate verses: the first two for manuals alone have one or two quasi-improvisatory voices accompanying a plain cantus firmus; the third verse is a four-part setting for two manuals and pedal with a highly ornamented cantus firmus in the soprano voice. The cantus firmus is also elaborately developed in Buxtehude's ornamental choral prelude BuxWV 219 for two manuals and pedal.

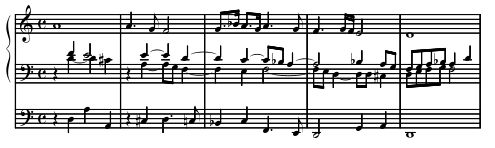
Buxtehude's Vater unser im Himmelreich, BuxWV 219

Georg Böhm also set the hymn twice as a chorale prelude (formerly misattributed to Bach as BWV 760 and 761), in addition to a setting as an organ partita.

Johann Sebastian Bach used the hymn tune in several of his chorale preludes for organ. One early setting (BWV 737) can be found in the collection of Neumeister Chorales. There is a four-part setting BWV 636 in his Orgelbüchlein (Little Organ Book). Bach's late Clavier-Übung III (German Organ Mass) contains a pair of settings BWV 682-683: an elaborate one for five voices with the cantus firmus in canon over a trio sonata ritornello; and a shorter four-part setting for single manual. In his choral works, Bach used the melody in his cantata Es reißet euch ein schrecklich Ende, BWV 90 (1723), the chorale cantata Nimm von uns, Herr, du treuer Gott, BWV 101 (1724) and cantata Herr, deine Augen sehen nach dem Glauben, BWV 102 (1726), and stanza 4 (Dein Will gescheh, Herr Gott, zugleich) in his St John Passion (1724) (BWV 416 is an earlier version of the same harmonisation).

Felix Mendelssohn included the melody in his Sixth Organ Sonata. Max Reger composed a chorale prelude as No. 39 of his 52 Chorale Preludes, Op. 67 in 1902.

== See also ==
- List of hymns by Martin Luther
