= Daniel Erich =

German organist and composer

Daniel Erich (19 February 1649 in Lübeck – 30 October 1712 in Güstrow) was a German organist and composer.

Born into a musical family—his father was a lutenist and maker of stringed instruments in Lübeck—Erich studied for many years with Dietrich Buxtehude, who bought a tenor viol from his father in 1677. From 1675 until 1679, Erich played the positive organ in the choir loft at the Marienkirche in Lübeck. In 1679, he was appointed organist at the parish church in Güstrow (also the Marienkirche), a position he held until his death.

Erich also enjoyed a high reputation as an organ teacher and authority on the instrument, and in the latter capacity worked closely with the organ builder Arp Schnitger. In 1700, he played at the dedication of a new organ by Schnitger in the Dargun castle church.

Only four of his compositions survive. All are chorale preludes, none of them dated:

- Allein zu dir, Herr Jesu Christ, which has been described as "not very expressive";
- Christum wir sollen loben schon, described as "fantasy-like" and "virtuosic";
- Es ist das Heil uns kommen her, which "shows considerable originality"; and
- Von Gott will ich nicht lassen, a set of six "fluent" variations.

Christum wir sollen loben schon came to light when the Neumeister Collection was rediscovered in 1984, inspiring hope that other works may yet be found.
