= Ach Gott, vom Himmel sieh darein, BWV 2 =

Chorale cantata by Johann Sebastian Bach

Ach Gott, vom Himmel sieh darein
- BWV 2
- Chorale cantata by J. S. Bach
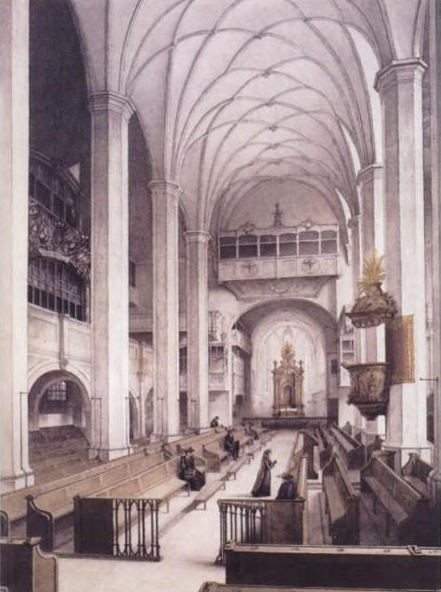
- Thomaskirche, Leipzig 1885
- Occasion: Second Sunday after Trinity
- Chorale: "Ach Gott, vom Himmel sieh darein" by Martin Luther
- Performed: 18 June 1724: Leipzig
- Movements: 6
- Vocal: SATB choir; solo: alto, tenor and bass
- Instrumental: 2 oboes; 4 trombones; 2 violins; viola; continuo

Ach Gott, vom Himmel sieh darein (Oh God, look down from heaven), BWV 2, is a chorale cantata composed by Johann Sebastian Bach for the second Sunday after Trinity in 1724. First performed on 18 June in Leipzig, it is the second cantata of his chorale cantata cycle. The church cantata is based on Martin Luther's 1524 hymn "Ach Gott, vom Himmel sieh darein", a paraphrase of Psalm 12.

In the format of Bach's chorale cantata cycle, the words of the hymn are retained unchanged only in the outer movements, while an unknown contemporary librettist paraphrased the inner stanzas for recitatives and arias. Bach structured the cantata in six movements, setting the chorale tune in a chorale fantasia in the opening movement, and in a four-part setting in the closing movement. The two choral movements frame alternating recitatives and arias of three vocal soloists. Bach also used a four-part choir, and a Baroque instrumental ensemble of a choir of trombones, two oboes, strings and continuo. He set the first movement in "archaic" motet style, but the arias in "modern" concertante style, only occasionally reminiscent of the chorale tune.

The cantata was first published in 1851, as No. 2 in the first volume published by the Bach Gesellschaft.

== History and words ==
Bach took office as Thomaskantor, music director in Leipzig, end of May 1723. It was part of his duties to supply music for the Sundays and feast days of the liturgical year at four churches of the town, and he decided to compose new cantatas for these occasions. He began with a cantata for the first Sunday after Trinity in 1723, performed on 30 May, and wrote a series of church cantatas until Trinity of the next year, which became known as his first cantata cycle. The following year, he composed new cantatas for the occasions of the liturgical year, each based on one Lutheran chorale, an effort which became known later as his chorale cantata cycle. He wrote Ach Gott, vom Himmel sieh darein as the second cantata of this cycle, which he began a week before with O Ewigkeit, du Donnerwort, BWV 20.

Bach wrote the cantata for the Second Sunday after Trinity. The prescribed readings for the Sunday were from the First Epistle of John, "He that loveth not his brother abideth in death" (1 John 3:13–18), and from the Gospel of Luke, the parable of the great banquet (Luke 14:16–24). The cantata is based on the chorale in sixth stanzas "Ach Gott, vom Himmel sieh darein", a paraphrase of Psalm 12 by Martin Luther, published in 1524 in the Achtliederbuch, the first Lutheran hymnal. In the format of Bach's chorale cantata cycle, the words of the hymn are retained unchanged in the outer movements, here the first and the sixth, while an unknown contemporary librettist transcribed the ideas of the inner stanzas in poetry for recitatives and arias, which matched the style of Bach's cantatas of the first cycle. Bach first performed the cantata on 18 June 1724.

== Music ==
=== Structure and scoring ===
Bach structured the cantata in six movements. The first and last are set for choir as a chorale fantasia and a closing chorale. They frame alternating recitatives and arias, with the text arranged by the librettist. Bach scored the work for three vocal soloists (alto (A), tenor (T) and bass (B)), a four-part choir, and a Baroque instrumental ensemble: four trombones (Tb), two oboes (Ob), two violins (Vl), viola (Va), and basso continuo (Bc). The duration of the piece has been stated as 20 minutes.

In the following table of the movements, the scoring follows the Neue Bach-Ausgabe. The keys and time signatures are taken from the book by Bach scholar Alfred Dürr, using the symbols for common time (4/4) and alla breve (2/2). The instruments are shown separately for winds and strings, while the continuo, playing throughout, is not shown.

Movements of Ach Gott, vom Himmel sieh darein
No.	Title	Text	Type	Vocal	Winds	Strings	Key	Time
1	Ach Gott, vom Himmel sieh darein	Luther	Chorale fantasia	SATB	4Tb 2Ob	2Vl Va	D minor	cut time
2	Sie lehren eitel falsche List	anon.	Recitative	T				common time
3	Tilg, o Gott, die Lehren	anon.	Aria	A		Vl solo	B-flat major	3/4
4	Die Armen sind verstört	anon.	Recitative	B		2Vl Va		common time
5	Durchs Feuer wird das Silber rein	anon.	Aria	T	2Ob	2Vl Va	G minor	common time
6	Das wollst du, Gott, bewahren rein	Luther	Chorale	SATB	4Tb 2Ob	2Vl Va	D minor	common time

=== Movements ===
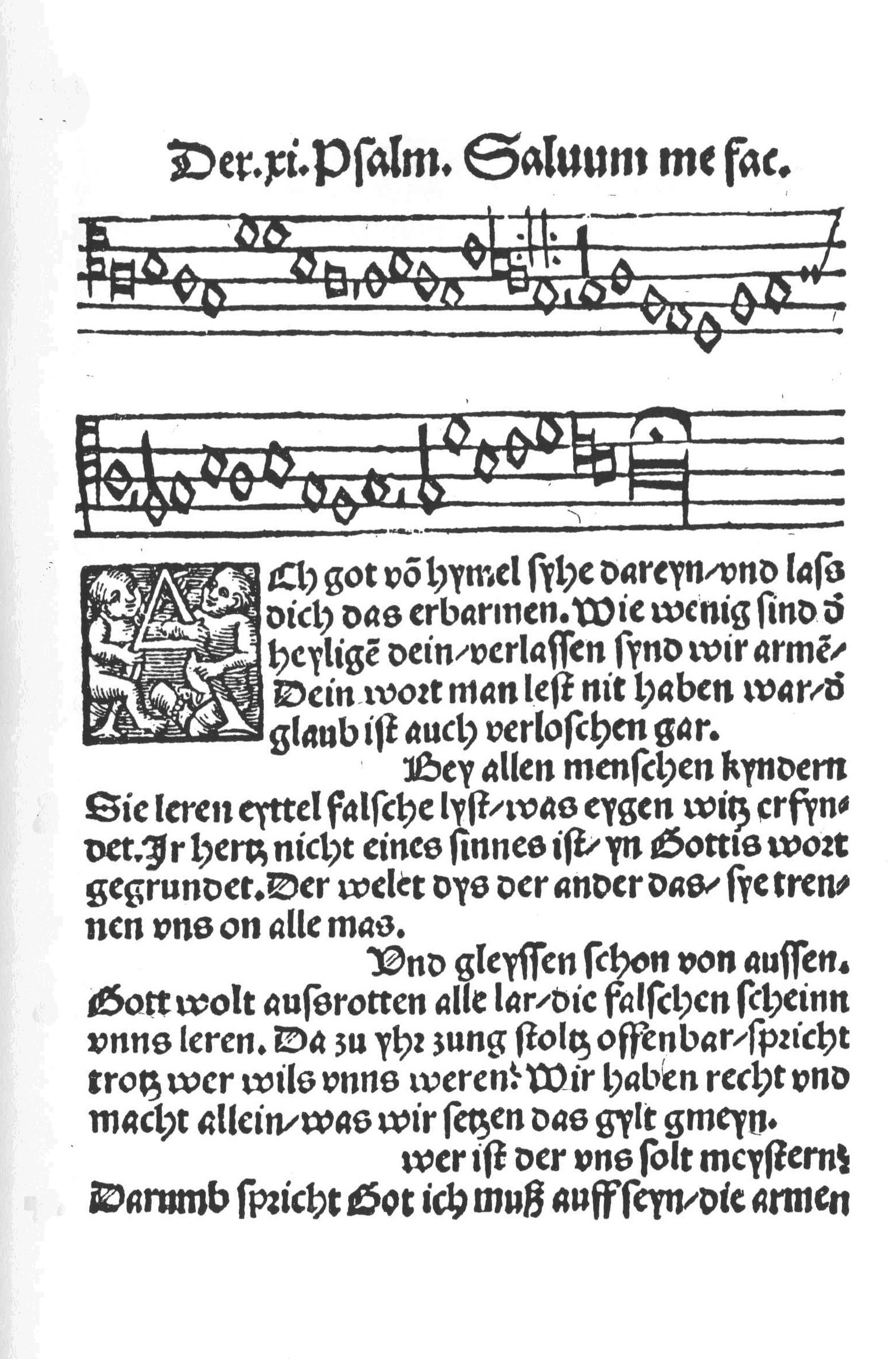
The hymn in the Erfurt Enchiridion of 1524

The first and last movements set Luther's original words and the original melody, both dating to 1524 and thus already 200 years old when Bach wrote his cantata. Bach used a style that has been called "archaic": the instruments include a choir of trombones doubling the voices.

==== 1 ====
In the opening chorale fantasia, "Ach Gott, vom Himmel sieh darein" (Ah God, look down from heaven), the melody of the chorale is sung by the alto in long notes as a cantus firmus, doubled by two oboes. Dürr calls it an exemplary cantus firmus motet, with each entrance of the chorale tune prepared by fugal entrances of the other voices on the same theme. The instruments double the voices, with the occasional exception of the continuo. John Eliot Gardiner, who conducted the Bach Cantata Pilgrimage in 2000 and recorded Ach Gott, vom Himmel sieh darein at the Basilique Saint-Denis in Paris, assumes that the severe text caused Bach to return to the austere motet style which was already old-fashioned.

==== 2 ====
The second movement is a secco recitative, "Sie lehren eitel falsche List, was wider Gott und seine Wahrheit ist" (They teach vain, false deceit, which is opposed to God and His truth), which changes to arioso for two lines that resemble the words of the chorale. These lines are marked adagio, and in them the continuo plays in canon with the voice.

==== 3 ====
The alto aria, "Tilg, o Gott, die Lehren, so dein Wort verkehren!" (O God, remove the teachings that pervert your word!), is written in more modern concertante style with a solo violin as the obbligato instrument, playing lively figuration. The last line of the text remains close to the original, and again Bach quotes the chorale tune.

==== 4 ====
The bass recitative, "Die Armen sind verstört" (The wretched are confused), is accompanied by the strings. It changes to arioso during the middle section, which lets God respond to the pleas of the sinners: "Ich muss ihr Helfer sein" (I must be their helper). Even in the outer sections, the string writing enforces a certain rigidity of the rhythm.

==== 5 ====
The tenor aria, "Durchs Feuer wird das Silber rein, durchs Kreuz das Wort bewährt erfunden." (Through fire silver is purified, through the cross the Word is verified.), is accompanied by a concerto of the oboes and strings. The instruments are first silent in the middle section, but return for its transition to the da capo with the words "Im Kreuz und Tod geduldig sein" (be patient in cross-bearing and distress). Gardiner notes that the instrumental music suggests "liquid movement or the flow of molten metal", and recalls Bach's interest in coins and precious metals, and of contemporary alchemists in Dresden trying to turn base metal to gold for August the Strong, but making porcelain instead.

==== 6 ====
The closing chorale, "Das wollst du, Gott, bewahren rein für diesem arg'n Geschlechte" (This, God, you would keep pure before this wicked race; ), is a four-part setting, with all instruments reinforcing the voices.

== Manuscripts and publication ==
The autograph score is held by the Staatsbibliothek zu Berlin (Preußischer Kulturbesitz).

The cantata was originally published in 1851 as No. 2 in the first volume of the Bach-Gesellschaft Ausgabe (BGA), edited by Moritz Hauptmann. The New Bach Edition (Neue Bach-Ausgabe, NBA) published the score in 1981, edited by George S. Bozarth, with the critical commentary published in 1984.

== Recordings ==
Recordings of Bach's cantatas began in the first half of the 20th century. Several series of recordings, often for broadcasting, were made from 1950. Nikolaus Harnoncourt and Gustav Leonhardt were the first to begin recording the complete cantatas in a 20-year collaboration using period instruments, boys' choirs and boy soloists. Helmuth Rilling completed a recording of the sacred cantatas and oratorios on Bach's 300th birthday, 21 March 1985. Other projects to record all sacred cantatas in historically informed performance were completed by Ton Koopman, John Eliot Gardiner, Pieter Jan Leusink and Masaaki Suzuki. Sigiswald Kuijken began to record a cycle of cantatas for the Complete Liturgical Year with an OVPP choir and historic instruments, the ensemble La Petite Bande.

In the following table, green background indicates an ensemble playing period instruments in historically informed performance. The year is of the recording, then of a release, if different.

Recordings of Ach Gott, vom Himmel sieh darein
Title	Conductor / Choir / Orchestra	Soloists	Label	Year	Orch. type
J. S. Bach: Das Kantatenwerk – Sacred Cantatas Vol. 1	Nikolaus Harnoncourt: Wiener Sängerknaben; Chorus Viennensis; Concentus Musicus Wien	Paul Esswood; Kurt Equiluz; Max van Egmond	Teldec	1971	Period
Die Bach Kantate Vol. 39	Helmuth Rilling Gächinger Kantorei Bach-Collegium Stuttgart	Helen Watts; Aldo Baldin; Walter Heldwein	Hänssler	1979	
J. S. Bach: Complete Cantatas Vol. 10	Ton Koopman Amsterdam Baroque Orchestra & Choir	Michael Chance; Paul Agnew; Klaus Mertens	Antoine Marchand	(2005)	Period
Bach Edition Vol. 12 – Cantatas Vol. 6	Pieter Jan Leusink Holland Boys Choir Netherlands Bach Collegium	Sytse Buwalda; Knut Schoch; Bas Ramselaar	Brilliant Classics	(2006)	Period
Bach Cantatas Vol. 2: Paris/Zürich	John Eliot Gardiner Monteverdi Choir English Baroque Soloists	Daniel Taylor; James Gilchrist; Stephen Varcoe	Soli Deo Gloria	(2010)	Period
J.S. Bach: Cantatas for the First and Second Sundays After Trinity	Craig Smith Chorus of Emmanuel Music Orchestra of Emmanuel Music	Susan Trout; William Hite; Paul Guttry	Koch International	2001	
J.S. Bach: "O Ewigkeit du Donnerwort" – Cantatas BWV 2, 20 & 176	Philippe Herreweghe Collegium Vocale Gent	Ingeborg Danz; Jan Kobow; Peter Kooy	Harmonia Mundi France	2002	Period
J.S. Bach: Cantatas Vol. 29 – Cantatas from Leipzig 1724	Masaaki Suzuki: Bach Collegium Japan; Concerto Palatino Brass Ensemble	Pascal Bertin; Gerd Türk; Peter Kooy	BIS	2004 (2005)	Period
Cantatas : BWV 20–2–10 / "O Ewigkeit, du Donnerwort"	Sigiswald Kuijken soloists + soprano Siri Thornhill (OVPP) La Petite Bande	Petra Noskaiová; Marcus Ullmann; Jan van der Crabben	Accent	(2008)	Period

== Bibliography ==
General

- "Ach Gott, vom Himmel sieh darein BWV 2; BC A 98 / Chorale cantata (2nd Sunday after Trinity)". Bach digital website, managed by Bach Archive, SLUB, SBB and Leipzig University. 2017.
- "Berlin, Staatsbibliothek zu Berlin – Preußischer Kulturbesitz / D-B N. Mus. ms. 681". Bach digital website, managed by Bach Archive, SLUB, SBB and Leipzig University. 2017.

Books

- Dürr, Alfred; Jones, Richard D. P. (2006). The Cantatas of J. S. Bach: With Their Librettos in German-English Parallel Text. Oxford University Press. pp. 26, 402–405. ISBN 978-0-19-929776-4.

Journals

- Hofreiter, Paul (1995). "Johann Sebastian Bach and Scripture / O God, from Heaven Look Down" (PDF). Concordia Theological Quarterly. 59 (2).

Online sources

- Dahn, Luke (2024). "BWV 2.6". bach-chorales.com.
- Dellal, Pamela (2015). "BWV 2 – Ach Gott, vom Himmel sieh darein". Emmanuel Music.
- France, John (2013). "Johann Sebastian BACH (1685–1750) / Leipzig Cantatas". musicweb-international.com.
- Gardiner, John Eliot (2010). Bach: Cantatas Nos 2, 10, 21, 76 & 135 (Cantatas Vol 2) (Media notes). Soli Deo Gloria (at Hyperion Records website).
- Ibbitson, John (8 November 2013). "A Bach cantata two decades in the making". The Globe and Mail.
- McElhearn, Kirk (2001). "Johann Sebastian BACH (1685–1750) / Cantatas Vol. 29: Cantatas from Leipzig, 1724". musicweb-international.com.
- Quinn, John (2006). "Johann Sebastian BACH (1685–1750) / Cantatas Vol. 29: Cantatas from Leipzig, 1724". musicweb-international.com.
- Wilson, Brian (2013). "Johann Sebastian BACH (1685–1750) / Cantatas for the complete Liturgical Year, Volume 15". musicweb-international.com.
- "Bach: Cantatas For The Complete Liturgical Year Vol 7 / Kuijken, La Petite Bande, Et Al". arkivmusic.com. 2017. Archived from the original on 14 June 2015.
