= Neumeister Collection =

82 chorale preludes in a manuscript copy produced by Johann Gottfried Neumeister

The Neumeister Collection is a compilation of 82 chorale preludes found in a manuscript copy produced by Johann Gottfried Neumeister (1757–1840). When the manuscript was rediscovered at Yale University in the 1980s it appeared to contain 31 previously unknown early chorale settings by Johann Sebastian Bach, which were added to the BWV catalogue as Nos. 1090–1120, and published in 1985.

== History ==
Neumeister compiled his manuscript after 1790. It has been suggested that the 77 earliest works in the collection may have been copied from a single source, possibly a Bach family album put together in J. S. Bach's early years. The five works by Neumeister's own music teacher, Georg Andreas Sorge, were a later addition.

Some time after 1807 the manuscript passed to Christian Heinrich Rinck (1770–1846), whose library was bought by Lowell Mason in 1852. After Mason's death in 1873, his collection was acquired by Yale University in New Haven, Connecticut. There the Neumeister volume lay as manuscript LM 4708 until it was rediscovered "early in 1984" by musicologists Christoph Wolff (Harvard), Hans-Joachim Schulze (Bach-Archiv Leipzig), and librarian Harold E. Samuel (Yale). After satisfying themselves that the manuscript was genuine, they announced the discovery in December 1984. Their conclusions were confirmed in January 1985 by German organist Wilhelm Krumbach (1937–2005), who had been working on the same material independently, and with a fatal lack of urgency, since 1981. Wolff acknowledged that he brought his announcement forward when he learned that Krumbach was in the field. Krumbach was unhappy with the way things turned out.

== Works and composers ==
The Neumeister Collection contains 82 chorales, most of them unpublished before the 1980s re-evaluation of the Neumeister manuscript. The attribution of a few pieces in the manuscript remains uncertain:

- 3 by Johann Christoph Bach (1642–1703), (Note: This is Johann Sebastian's cousin, Johann Christoph Bach (1642–1703) of Eisenach, not his uncle Johann Christoph Bach (1645–1693) of Arnstadt, or his older brother and teacher Johann Christoph Bach (1671–1721) of Orhdruf.) brother of Johann Michael and cousin of Johann Sebastian
- At least 24 by Johann Michael Bach (1648–1694), cousin and father-in-law of Johann Sebastian
- Around 38 by Johann Sebastian Bach (1685–1750)
- 1 by Daniel Erich (1649–1712)
- 1 or more by Johann Pachelbel (1653–1706)
- 5 by Georg Andreas Sorge (1703–1778)
- 1 possibly by Johann Gottfried Walther
- 4 by Friedrich Wilhelm Zachow (1663–1712)
- 5 unattributed works

From the state of the manuscript Wolff concludes that the five unattributed works were written by composers represented elsewhere in the collection, whose names were omitted by accident. Weighing both textual and stylistic evidence, he proposes Johann Michael Bach as the author of all five, while allowing that one could also have been written by J. S. Bach and another by Friedrich Wilhelm Zachow.

Organ chorales in the Neumeister Collection with attribution variants from RISM and Bach Digital
#	BWV	Composer	Chorale	Key	RISM	Authenticity
1		Bach, J. M.	Nun komm der Heiden Heiland	G min.	000105398	Confirmed
2		Bach, J. M.	Meine Seele erhebt dem Herrn	D min.	000105399	Confirmed
3		Bach, J. M.	Herr Christ der einig Gottes Sohn	G maj.	000105400	Confirmed
4		Bach, J. M.	Nun freut euch lieben Christen gemein	G maj.	000105401	Also attr. Pachelbel, J.
5		Bach, J. M.	Nun freut euch lieben Christen gemein	G maj.	000105402	Confirmed
6		Bach, J. M.	Gott hat das Evangelium	D min.	000105403	Confirmed
7		Bach, J. M.	Gott hat das Evangelium	D min.	000105404	Confirmed
8	723	Bach, J. M.	Gelobet seist du Jesu Christ	D min.	000105405	Also attr. Bach, J. S.
9		Zachow, F. W.	Gelobet seist du Jesu Christ	G maj.	000105406	Confirmed
10		Zachow, F. W.	Vom Himmel hoch da komm ich her	D maj.	000105407	Confirmed
11	719	Bach, J. S.	Der Tag der ist so freudenreich	G maj.	000105408	Also attr. Pachelbel, J.
12	751	Bach, J. S.	In dulci jubilo	G maj.	000105409	Also attr. Bach, J. M. – Walther, J. G.
13		Erich, D.	Christum wir sollen loben schon	E min.	000105410	Confirmed
14	1090	Bach, J. S.	Wir Christenleut'	G min.	000105411	Confirmed
15	1091	Bach, J. S.	Das alte Jahr vergangen ist	D min.	000105412	Confirmed
16	1092	Bach, J. S.	Herr Gott nun schleuß den Himmel auf	A min.	000105413	Confirmed
17	1093	Bach, J. S.	Herzliebster Jesu was hast du verbrochen	G min.	000105414	Confirmed
18	1094	Bach, J. S.	O Jesu wie ist dein Gestalt	G min.	000105415	Confirmed
19	1095	Bach, J. S.	O Lamm Gottes unschuldig	F maj.	000105416	Confirmed
20	1096	Bach, J. S.	Christe der du bist Tag und Licht, oder Wir danken dir, Herr Jesu Christ	A min.	000105417	Also attr. Pachelbel, J.
21	1097	Bach, J. S.	Ehre sei dir Christe der du leidest Not	D maj.	000105418	Confirmed
22		anonymous	Christ lag in Todesbanden	D min.	000105419	
23		Bach, J. M.	Jesus Christus unser Heiland	G min.	000105420	Confirmed
24		Bach, J. M.	O Herr Gott Vater in Ewigkeit	G maj.	000105421	Confirmed
25		Sorge, G. A.	Vater unser im Himmelreich	D min.	000105422	
26		Bach, J. M.	Der du bist drei in Einigkeit	G maj.	000105423	Confirmed
27		Bach, J. Chr.	Allein Gott in der Höh sei Ehr	F maj.	000105424	Confirmed
28		Bach, J. M.	Allein Gott in der Höh sei Ehr	G maj.	000105425	Confirmed
29		Bach, J. M.	Mag ich Unglück nicht widerstahn	A min.	000105426	Confirmed
30		Bach, J. M.	Dies sind die heilgen zehn Gebot	F maj.	000105427	Confirmed
31	1098	Bach, J. S.	Wir glauben all an einen Gott	D min.	000105428	Confirmed
32	1099	Bach, J. S.	Aus tiefer Not schrei ich zu dir	G maj.	000105429	Confirmed
33	1100	Bach, J. S.	Allein zu dir Herr Jesu Christ	C maj.	000105430	Confirmed
34		Pachelbel, J.	Allein zu dir Herr Jesu Christ	A min.	000105431	Confirmed
35	714	Bach, J. S.	Ach Gott und Herr	B min.	000105432	Confirmed
36	742	Bach, J. S.	Ach Herr mich armen Sünder	B min.	000105433	Confirmed
37		Bach, J. M.	Auf meinen lieben Gott	E min.	000105434	Confirmed
38	1101	Bach, J. S.	Durch Adams Fall ist ganz verderbt	D min.	000105435	Confirmed
39		Bach, J. M.	Nun laßt uns Gott dem Herren	G maj.	000105436	Confirmed
40	1102	Bach, J. S.	Du Friedefürst Herr Jesu Christ	B♭ maj.	000105437	Confirmed
41		anonymous	Was mein Gott will das gescheh allzeit	A min.	000105438	
42		Bach, J. M.	Kommt her zu mir spricht Gottes Sohn	G min.	000105439	Confirmed
43		anonymous	Ich ruf' zu dir Herr Jesu Christ	D min.	000105440	
44		anonymous	Ich ruf' zu dir Herr Jesu Christ	G min.	000105441	
45		Bach, J. M.	Der Herr ist mein getreuer Hirt	G min.	000105442	Confirmed
46		Bach, J. M.	Warum betrübst du dich mein Herz	G min.	000105443	Confirmed
47		Bach, J. M.	Von Gott will ich nicht lassen	G min.	000105444	Confirmed
48	1103	Bach, J. S.	Erhalt uns Herr bei deinem Wort	G min.	000105445	Confirmed
49	737	Bach, J. S.	Vater unser im Himmelreich	D min.	000105446	Confirmed
50	1104	Bach, J. S.	Wenn dich Unglück tut greifen an	E min.	000105447	Confirmed
51	1105	Bach, J. S.	Jesu meine Freude	D min.	000105448	Confirmed
52	1106	Bach, J. S.	Gott ist mein Heil mein' Hilf' und Trost	G maj.	000105449	Confirmed
53		Bach, J. M.	Ach Gott vom Himmel sieh darein	D min.	000105450	Confirmed
54		Bach, J. M.	Es spricht der Unweisen Mund wohl	G maj.	000105451	Confirmed
55		Bach, J. M.	Wo Gott der Herr nicht bei uns hält	E min.	000105452	Confirmed
56		Bach, J. Chr.	An Wasserflüssen Babylon	G maj.	000105453	Confirmed
57	1107	Bach, J. S.	Jesu meines Lebens Leben	D maj.	000105454	Confirmed
58	1108	Bach, J. S.	Als Jesus Christus in der Nacht	E min.	000105455	Confirmed
59	1109	Bach, J. S.	Ach Gott tu dich erbarmen	D min.	000105456	Confirmed
60	1110	Bach, J. S.	O Herre Gott dein göttlich' Wort	B♭ maj.	000105457	Confirmed
61		Zachow, F. W.	Wie schön leuchtet der Morgenstern	D maj.	000105458	Confirmed
62		anonymous	Heut triumphieret Gottes Sohn	E min.	000105459	
63		Bach, J. M.	Wenn mein Stündlein vorhanden ist	G maj.	000105460	Confirmed
64	1111	Bach, J. S.	Nun laßt uns den Leib begraben	G maj.	000105461	Confirmed
65	1112	Bach, J. S.	Christus der ist mein Leben	F maj.	000105462	Confirmed
66	1113	Bach, J. S.	Ich hab' mein' Sach' Gott heimgestellt	B min.	000105463	Confirmed
67	1114	Bach, J. S.	Herr Jesu Christ du höchstes Gut	F min.	000105464	Confirmed
68	1115	Bach, J. S.	Herzlich lieb hab ich dich o Herr	C maj.	000105465	Confirmed
69	1116	Bach, J. S.	Was Gott tut das ist wohlgetan	G maj.	000105466	Confirmed
70	1117	Bach, J. S.	Alle Menschen müssen sterben	B♭ maj.	000105467	Confirmed
71	957	Bach, J. S.	Mach's mit mir Gott nach deiner Güt	G maj.	000105468	Confirmed
72	1118	Bach, J. S.	Werde munter mein Gemüte	G maj.	000105469	Confirmed
73	1119	Bach, J. S.	Wie nach einer Wasserquelle	D min.	000105470	Confirmed
74		Bach, J. Chr.	Wer Gott vertraut	F maj.	000105471	Confirmed
75	1120	Bach, J. S.	Christ der du bist der helle Tag	E min.	000105472	Confirmed
76		Zachow, F. W.	Erbarm dich mein o Herre Gott	E min.	000105473	Confirmed
77	639	Bach, J. S.	Ich ruf zu dir Herr Jesu Christ	F min.	000105474	Confirmed
78	601	Bach, J. S.	Herr Christ der einige Gottes Sohn	A maj.	000105475	Confirmed
79		Sorge, G. A.	Auf Christenmensch	F maj.	000105476	Confirmed
80		Sorge, G. A.	Wo Gott der Herr	G min.	000105477	Confirmed
81		Sorge, G. A.	Herr Jesu Christ du höchstes Gut	A min.	000105478	Confirmed
82		Sorge, G. A.	Freu dich sehr o meine Seele	G maj.	000105479	Confirmed

=== Johann Michael Bach ===
The rediscovery of the Neumeister Collection quadrupled the number of keyboard works indisputably written by Johann Michael Bach, from eight to thirty-two, with six more arguably also his. Of the twenty-five pieces attributed to him in the manuscript, seven were known but had been credited to other composers and eighteen were entirely new, making this the largest single trove of his work. This remains the case even if, as some have suggested, one of the chorales that appears under his name would have been composed by Johann Heinrich Buttstett. Wolff has proposed that the five unattributed works in the volume could also be by Johann Michael Bach—confidently in three cases, less so in the other two.

Generally attributed to J. M. Bach:

1. Nun komm der Heiden Heiland, RISM 000105398
2. Meine Seele erhebt dem Herrn, RISM 000105399
3. Herr Christ der einig Gottes Sohn, RISM 000105400
4. Nun freut euch lieben Christen gemein (1), RISM 000105401, however also attributed to J. Pachelbel
5. Nun freut euch lieben Christen gemein (2), RISM 000105402
6. Gott hat das Evangelium (1), RISM 000105403
7. Gott hat das Evangelium (2), RISM 000105404
8. Gelobet seist du Jesu Christ, RISM 000105405, BWV 723, previously attributed to J. S. Bach.
9. Jesus Christus unser Heiland, RISM 000105420
10. O Herr Gott Vater in Ewigkeit, RISM 000105421
11. Der du bist drei in Einigkeit, RISM 000105423
12. Allein Gott in der Höh sei Ehr, RISM 000105425
13. Mag ich Unglück nicht widerstahn, RISM 000105426
14. Dies sind die heilgen zehn Gebot, RISM 000105427
15. Auf meinen lieben Gott, RISM 000105434
16. Nun laßt uns Gott dem Herren, RISM 000105436
17. Kommt her zu mir spricht Gottes Sohn, RISM 000105439
18. Der Herr ist mein getreuer Hirt, RISM 000105442
19. Warum betrübst du dich mein Herz, RISM 000105443
20. Von Gott will ich nicht lassen, RISM 000105444
21. Ach Gott vom Himmel sieh darein, RISM 000105450
22. Es spricht der Unweisen Mund wohl, RISM 000105451
23. Wo Gott der Herr nicht bei uns hält, RISM 000105452
24. Wenn mein Stündlein vorhanden ist, RISM 000105460

Likely by J. M. Bach:

1. In dulci jubilo, RISM 000105409, BWV 751, partially attributed to J. S. Bach, possibly by J. G. Walther.

Possibly by J. M. Bach, the five anonymous preludes:

1. Christ lag in Todesbanden, RISM 000105419
2. Was mein Gott will das gescheh allzeit, RISM 000105438
3. Ich ruf' zu dir Herr Jesu Christ (in D minor), RISM 000105440
4. Ich ruf' zu dir Herr Jesu Christ (in G minor), RISM 000105441
5. Heut triumphieret Gottes Sohn, RISM 000105459

=== Johann Sebastian Bach ===
The rediscovered manuscript prompted revisions to J. S. Bach's catalogue and reconsideration of his musical development. The collection contains 40 chorales with a BWV number:

- Nine chorales were listed in the 1950 first edition of the Bach-Werke-Verzeichnis: BWV 601, 639, 714, 719, 723, 737, 742, 751 and 957.
- 31 chorales, BWV 1090–1120, were assigned a number in the 1990 second edition of the catalogue.

Two chorales of the first edition of the BWV catalogue are no longer generally associated with J. S. Bach:

- Gelobet seist du, Jesu Christ, BWV 723: although retained in the main catalogue in the 1990s editions of the Bach-Werke-Verzeichnis (not moved to the Anhang of either the doubtful or spurious works), it is often attributed to J. M. Bach, as it is in the Neumeister manuscript.
- In dulci jubilo, BWV 751: moved to BWV Anh. III (spurious works), it is attributed to J. M. Bach or J. G. Walther.

The other thirty-eight works are most often attributed to J. S. Bach, and are sometimes referred to as the Arnstädter Chorales. Five of them were already known from other sources:

- three in near-identical form:
  - Herr Christ, der ein'ge Gottes Sohn (or) Herr Gott, nun sei gepreiset, BWV 601, and Ich ruf zu dir, Herr Jesu Christ, BWV 639, from the Orgelbüchlein
  - Vater unser im Himmelreich, BWV 737.
- two in similar form:
  - Der Tag, der ist so freudenreich, BWV 719, wrongly attributed to J. Chr. Bach. This prelude is, in part, identical to Der Tag, der ist so freudenreich, P. 85 (T. 27), by J. Pachelbel.
  - Ach Herr, mich armen Sünder, BWV 742, wrongly attributed to Georg Böhm.

The other thirty-three were partly or wholly new:

- Two previously known only from fragments:
  - Ach Gott und Herr, BWV 714.
  - Machs mit mir, Gott, nach deiner Güt, BWV 957: the previously known part had been included as Fugue in G major in Bach's keyboard compositions.
- Thirty-one previously unknown works (BWV 1090–1120) now identified as the Neumeister Chorales Nos. 1–31 (including BWV 1096, a somewhat different version of which was known as J. Pachelbel's, from another source):
1. Wir Christenleut, BWV 1090
2. Das alte Jahr vergangen ist, BWV 1091
3. Herr Gott nun schleuß den Himmel auf, BWV 1092
4. O Lamm Gottes unschuldig, BWV 1095
  Performed by Ulrich Metzner
5. Herzliebster Jesu, was hast du verbrochen, BWV 1093
6. O Jesu, wie ist deine Gestalt, BWV 1094
7. O Lamm Gottes, unschuldig, BWV 1095
8. Christe, der du bist Tag und Licht, BWV 1096, a.k.a. Wir danken dir, Herr Jesu Christ, possibly by J. Pachelbel, moved to Anh. III (the annex of the spurious works) in BWV^{2a} (1998). The Bach Digital website lists both Bach and Pachelbel as possible composers.
9. Ehre sei dir, Christe, der du leidest Not, BWV 1097
10. Wir glauben all an einen Gott, BWV 1098
11. Allein zu dir, Herr Jesu Christ, BWV 1100
  Performed by Martin Hruschka (live)
12. Aus tiefer Not schrei ich zu Dir, BWV 1099
13. Allein zu dir, Herr Jesu Christ, BWV 1100
14. Durch Adams Fall ist ganz verderbt, BWV 1101
15. Du Friedefürst, Herr Jesu Christ, BWV 1102
16. Erhalt uns, Herr, bei deinem Wort, BWV 1103
17. Wenn dich Unglück tut greifen an, BWV 1104
18. Jesu, meine Freude, BWV 1105
19. Gott ist mein Heil, mein Hilf und Trost, BWV 1106
20. Jesu, meines Lebens Leben, BWV 1107
21. Als Jesus Christus in der Nacht, BWV 1108
22. Ach Gott, tu dich erbarmen, BWV 1109
23. Oh Herre Gott, dein göttlich Wort, BWV 1110
24. Nun lasst uns den Leib begraben, BWV 1111
25. Christus, der ist mein Leben, BWV 1112
26. Ich hab mein Sach Gott heimgestellt, BWV 1113
27. Herr Jesu Christ, du höchstes Gut, BWV 1114
28. Herzlich lieb hab ich dich, o Herr, BWV 1115
29. Werde munter mein Gemüte, BWV 1118
  Performed by Martin Hruschka (live)
30. Was Gott tut, das ist wohlgetan, BWV 1116
31. Alle Menschen müssen sterben, BWV 1117
32. Werde munter mein Gemüte, BWV 1118
33. Wie nach einer Wasserquelle, BWV 1119
34. Christ, der du bist der helle Tag, BWV 1120

The Arnstädter Chorales are considered on stylistic grounds to be early works, probably dating from 1703 to 1707, when Bach was active at Arnstadt, and possibly even earlier. They provide a new window on his formative years as a composer and cast the chorale preludes in the Orgelbüchlein, previously considered his earliest essays in the form, in a fresh light: the Orgelbüchlein pieces are not the work of a precocious beginner, but of an already practised hand.

== Publication ==
Wolff published the chorale preludes by J. S. Bach in 1985, and a facsimile of the complete collection in 1986. Scores of the other composers here: https://partitura.org/index.php/bach-johann-michael/

=== Entire Neumeister Collection ===
A facsimile of the entire collection was published in 1986. In the 21st century facsimile renderings of the Neumeister manuscript became available on the Bach Digital website.

=== 21st-century editions of Johann Sebastian Bach's Neumeister Chorales ===
Christoph Wolff's 2003 edition Orgelchoräle der Neumeister-Sammlung (Organ Chorales from the Neumeister Collection), Score and Critical Commentary, Volume 9 of Series IV: Organ Works of the New Bach Edition (Neue Bach-Ausgabe, NBA), includes 36 chorales (BWV 714, 719, 737, 742, 957 and 1090–1120). Of the 40 Neumeister chorales with a BWV number, four are not included in this edition:

- BWV 601 and 639, well known from the Orgelbüchlein.
- BWV 723 and 751: likely not by Bach.

The NBA volume presented Bach's Neumeister Chorales in the order in which they occurred in the Neumeister manuscript. The 2018 last two volumes of Breitkopf & Härtel (B&H)'s new Urtext edition of Bach's organ works included them in alphabetical order, that is, together with other chorale preludes transmitted independently of the collections collated by the composer. The B&H edition includes 35 chorale preludes of the Neumeister Collection: apart from the four BWV numbers not adopted in the NBA edition, it additionally omits BWV 1096 (likely composed by J. Pachelbel).

Johann Sebastian Bach's Neumeister Chorales, NBA (2003) and B&H (2018) publications
NBA	BWV	Title	B&H
1	719	Der Tag, der ist so freudenreich	IX, 33
2	1090	Wir Christenleut	X, 57
3	1091	Das alte Jahr vergangen ist	IX, 31
4	1092	Herr Gott nun schleuß den Himmel auf	X, 5
5	1093	Herzliebster Jesu, was hast du verbrochen	X, 11
6	1094	O Jesu, wie ist deine Gestalt	X, 37
7	1095	O Lamm Gottes, unschuldig	X, 39
8	1096	Christe, der du bist Tag und Licht	—
9	1097	Ehre sei dir, Christe, der du leidest Not	IX, 36
10	1098	Wir glauben all an einen Gott	X, 60
11	1099	Aus tiefer Not schrei ich zu Dir	IX, 22
12	1100	Allein zu dir, Herr Jesu Christ	IX, 18
13	714	Ach Gott und Herr	IX, 13
14	742	Ach Herr, mich armen Sünder	IX, 14
15	1101	Durch Adams Fall ist ganz verderbt	IX, 35
16	1102	Du Friedefürst, Herr Jesu Christ	IX, 34
17	1103	Erhalt uns, Herr, bei deinem Wort	IX, 40
18	737	Vater unser im Himmelreich	X, 43
19	1104	Wenn dich Unglück tut greifen an	X, 49
20	1105	Jesu, meine Freude	X, 18
21	1106	Gott ist mein Heil, mein Hilf und Trost	IX, 47
22	1107	Jesu, meines Lebens Leben	X, 20
23	1108	Als Jesus Christus in der Nacht	IX, 20
24	1109	Ach Gott, tu dich erbarmen	IX, 12
25	1110	O Herre Gott, dein göttlich Wort	X, 36
26	1111	Nun lasst uns den Leib begraben	X, 34
27	1112	Christus, der ist mein Leben	IX, 29
28	1113	Ich hab mein Sach Gott heimgestellt	X, 13
29	1114	Herr Jesu Christ, du höchstes Gut	X, 8
30	1115	Herzlich lieb hab ich dich, o Herr	X, 9
31	1116	Was Gott tut, das ist wohlgetan	X, 47
32	1117	Alle Menschen müssen sterben	IX, 19
33	957	Machs mit mir Gott, nach deiner Güt	X, 30
34	1118	Werde munter mein Gemüte	X, 53
35	1119	Wie nach einer Wasserquelle	X, 54
36	1120	Christ, der du bist der helle Tag	IX, 24

== Performances and recordings ==
The Bach chorales in the Neumeister Collection attracted the interest of organists even before they were published. They were first performed privately by Wilhelm Krumbach at Utrecht in January 1985, and publicly by John Ferris and Charles Krigbaum at Yale in March. Later the same year, Joseph Payne made the world-premiere recording for Harmonia Mundi at St. Paul's Church in Brookline, Massachusetts, working from a photostat of the Yale manuscript, and Werner Jacob made the first recording of the Wolff edition for EMI-Angel on a restored Johann Andreas Silbermann organ at Arlesheim cathedral.

== Sources ==
- Sara Ann Jones. The Neumeister Collection of Chorale Preludes of the Bach Circle: An Examination of the Chorale Preludes of J.S. Bach and Their Usage as Service Music and Pedagogical Works, Doctor of Musical Arts Dissertation, Louisiana State University, 2002
- Jean M. Perreault, edited by Donna K. Fitch. The Thematic Catalogue of the Musical Works of Johann Pachelbel. Lanham, Maryland: Scarecrow Press, 2004. ISBN 0-8108-4970-4,
- Russell Stinson. "Review: The Neumeister Collection of Chorale Preludes from the Bach Circle (Yale University Manuscript LM 4708) by Johann Sebastian Bach – Orgelchoräle der Neumeister-Sammlung / Organ Chorales from the Neumeister Collection by Johann Sebastian Bach, Christoph Wolff" pp. 352–361 in Journal of the American Musicological Society, Vol. 40 No. 2, Summer, 1987.
- Russell Stinson, "Some thoughts on Bach's Neumeister Chorales" in The Journal of Musicology, vol. 11, no. 4 (Autumn, 1993)
- Christoph Wolff (1991). "The Neumeister Collection of chorale preludes from the Bach circle", in Bach: Essays on His Life and Music New Haven, CT: Harvard University Press.
