= Our Father, Thou in Heaven Above =

Lutheran Christian hymn based on The Lord's Prayer

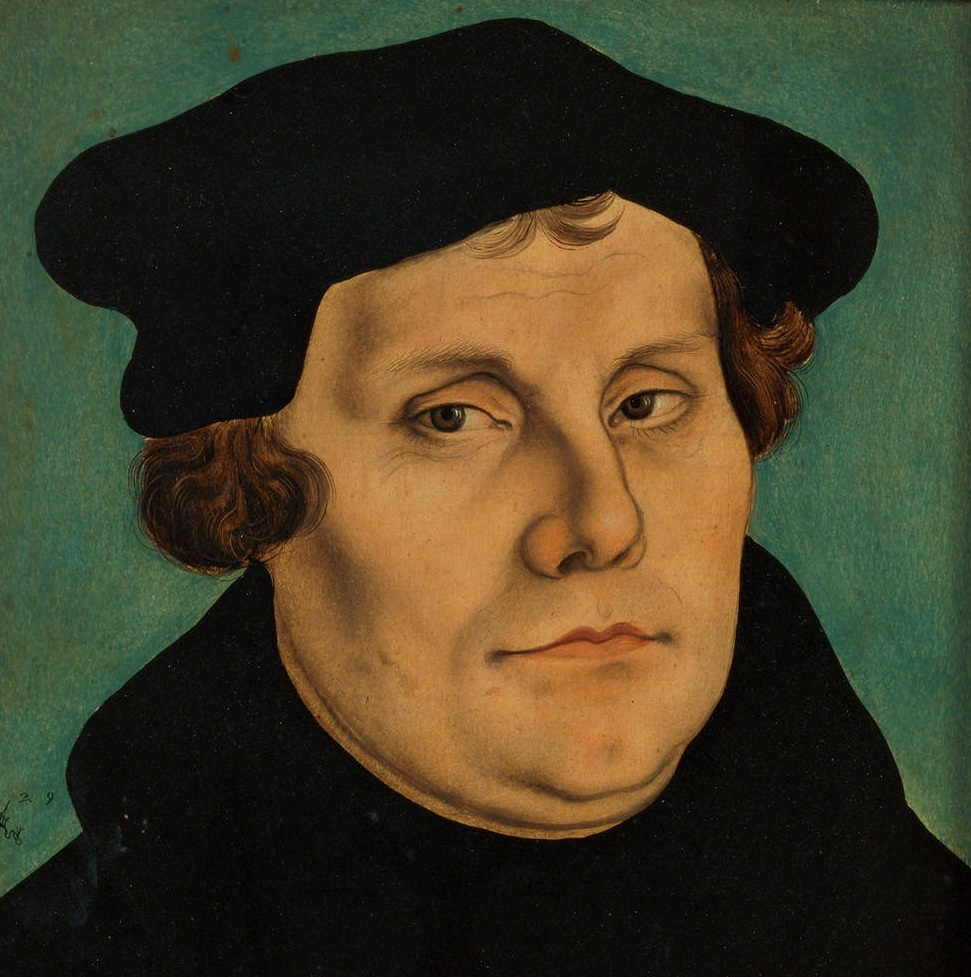
Martin Luther

"Our Father, Thou in Heaven Above" is a Lutheran Christian hymn based on The Lord's Prayer originally written in German in 1539 by Martin Luther and translated in 1863 into English by Catherine Winkworth.

== History ==
Martin Luther wrote "Vater unser im Himmelreich" based on The Lord's Prayer. Each verse of the hymn is used to elaborate on the requests in the Lord's Prayer to God. It was first published in 1539 in the Geistliche Lieder hymn book by Valentin Schumann and set to the tune of "Vater Unser" by an unknown composer.

In 1863, Luther's hymn was translated by the English Church of England hymn-translator Catherine Winkworth, who gave it the title of "Our Father, Thou in Heaven Above". It was first published in Winkworth's The Chorale Book for England. Her translation used the original textual style of Luther, with a theme of justice at a time when that theme was not as prevalent in hymns.

== Scriptural references ==
The scriptural inspiration for "Our Father, Thou in Heaven Above" was Matthew 6:9–12, the source of The Lord's Prayer.
