= Ach Gott, vom Himmel sieh darein =

Lutheran chorale of 1524, with words by Martin Luther

- Hymn by Martin Luther
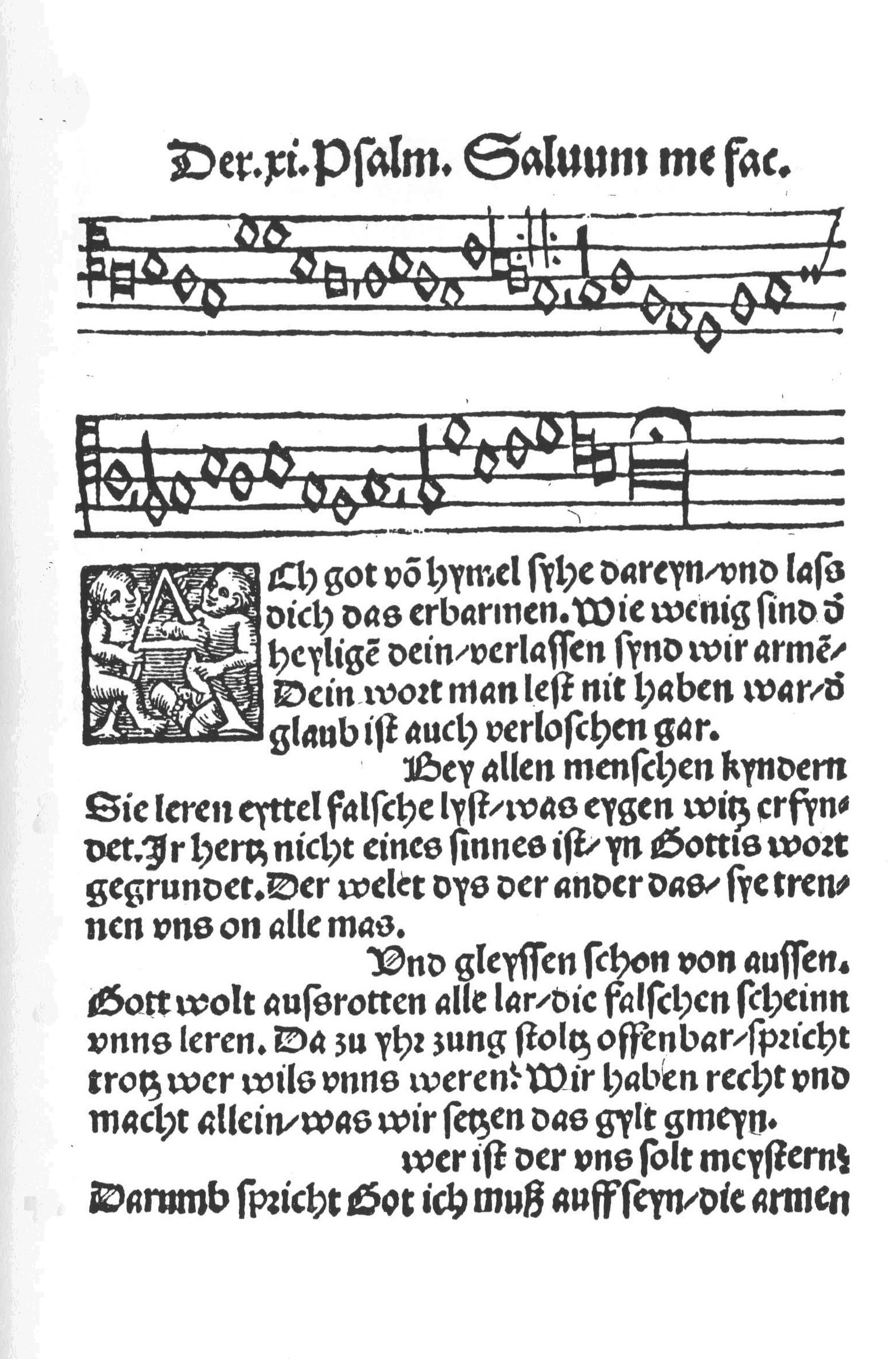
- "Der XI. Psalm Salvum me fac" in the Erfurt Enchiridion, 1524 (Zahn No. 4431 melody)
- English: Oh God, look down from heaven
- Catalogue: Zahn 4431–4432a
- Text: by Martin Luther
- Language: German
- Published: 1524

"Ach Gott, vom Himmel sieh darein" ("Oh God, look down from heaven") is a Lutheran chorale of 1524, with words written by Martin Luther paraphrasing Psalm 12. It was published as one of eight songs in 1524 in the first Lutheran hymnal, the Achtliederbuch, which contained four songs by Luther, three by Speratus, and one by Justus Jonas. It was contained in 1524 in the Erfurt Enchiridion. It is part of many hymnals, also in translations. The text inspired vocal and organ music by composers such as Heinrich Schütz, who set it as part of his Becker Psalter, and Johann Sebastian Bach, who based a chorale cantata on it. Mozart used one of its tunes in his opera The Magic Flute.

== History and text ==
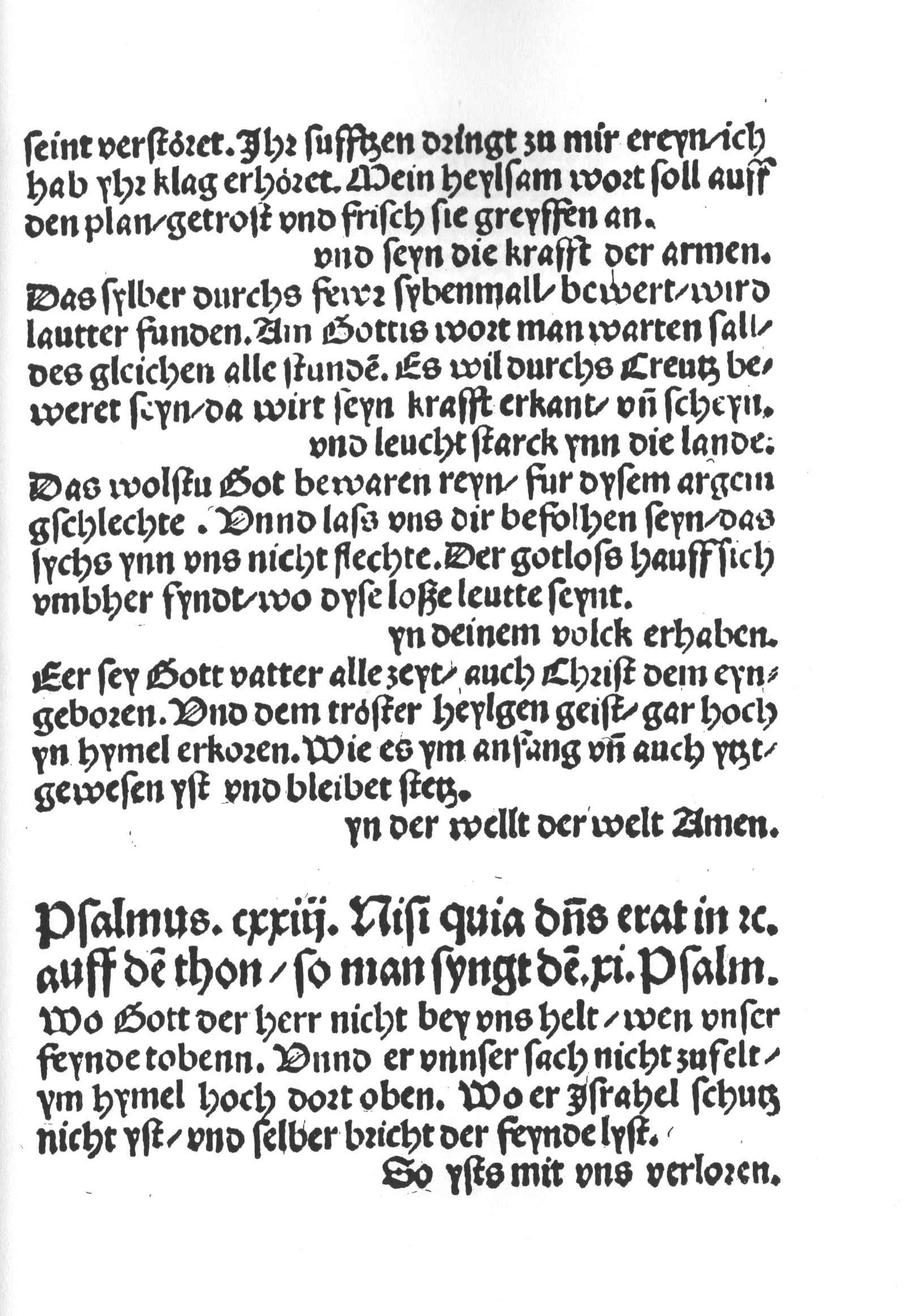
Der XI. Psalm Salvum me fac, p. 2, Erfurt Enchiridion, 1524

At the end of 1523, Luther paraphrased Psalm 12 (Psalm 11 in Vulgata numbering), Psalms 12, in Latin Salvum me fac, attempting to make the psalms accessible to Protestant church services in German. Luther's poetry first follows the verses of the psalm exactly, then combines two verses to one. He expanded the content of the psalm to show the precise situation of the early Reformation as a time of conflict.

The hymn was first printed as one page inserted in the Wittenberger Dreiliederblatt (lost). It was one of eight hymns of the first Lutheran hymnal, published 1524 in Nuremberg under the title Etlich Cristlich lider (Some Christian songs), also called Achtliederbuch. The same year it appeared in Erfurt in Eyn Enchiridion. The hymn was soon used as a Protestant Kampflied (battle song).

The chorale became the Lutheran Hauptlied (main hymn) for the second Sunday after Trinity.

== Melody ==
In the first Lutheran hymnal the melody was the same as for "Es ist das Heil uns kommen her" by Paul Speratus (Zahn No. 4430). In the Erfurt Enchiridion, also in 1524, the text first appeared with a tune codified by Martin Luther, Zahn No. 4431, which was derived from the secular song "Begierlich in dem Herzen mein" (The lustful desires in my heart) from about 1410. This melody is in Phrygian mode, preferred by Luther for texts of repentance, such as "Aus tiefer Not schrei ich zu dir". In Johann Walter's hymnal Eyn geystlich Gesangk Buchleyn, published in Wittenberg in 1524, it appeared with a different melody (Zahn No. 4432a).

== Musical settings ==
The Zahn No. 4431 melody was set by composers for instruments like harpsichord and organ, and for voices.

=== Instrumental ===
"Ach Gott vom Himmel, sieh darein"
Chorale prelude by Johann Pachelbel

Jan Pieterszoon Sweelinck composed a piece for harpsichord, elaborating on the tune. Johann Pachelbel composed two chorale preludes for organ. Johann Sebastian Bach's setting for organ chorale prelude, BWV 741, raises some problems of dating and authenticity according to Williams (2003).

=== Vocal ===
Heinrich Schütz set the chorale as part of the Becker Psalter. Bach used the complete chorale as the base for Ach Gott, vom Himmel sieh darein, BWV 2, a chorale cantata composed in 1724, but also in others as four-part settings (BWV 77 and BWV 153). Wilhelm Friedemann Bach set the chorale as a church cantata (Fk 96). In 1832, Felix Mendelssohn composed a chorale cantata for baritone, mixed choir and orchestra (MWV A13).

Mozart used the melody in his opera Die Zauberflöte in act 2, Finale, scene 10, when the two "Geharnischte" (men in armour) recite it in unison on Schikaneder's words "Der, welcher wandert diese Strasse voll Beschwerden" as a cantus firmus of a Baroque-style chorale prelude. Alfred Einstein commented in his biography Mozart / His Character, His Work:

In the second act it is the final test of the lovers, the "'test of fire and water", for which Mozart called into play every musical means at his disposal and for which he ordained extreme simplicity, extreme mastery; the scene of the men in armor, which he constructed in the form of a chorale prelude, building upon a solemn fugato around the chorale Ach Gott, vom Himmel sieh darein ...
