= Nun lasst uns den Leib begraben =

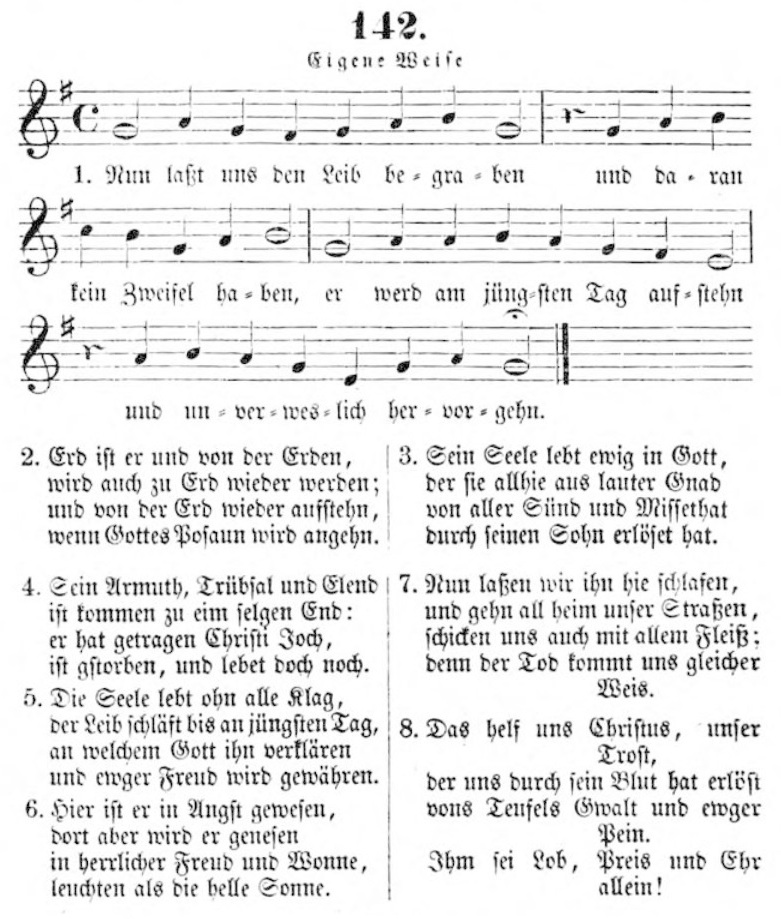
Nun lasst uns den Leib begraben, German Protestant hymnal 1854

"Nun lasst uns den Leib begraben" ("now let us bury the body"; second word also spelled as "laßt" or "lasset") is a Lutheran hymn for funerals. Its text author is Michael Weiße. It is for instance included in the Neu Leipziger Gesangbuch.

Johann Sebastian Bach set its hymn tune, Zahn No. 352, as a chorale prelude for organ: Nun lasset uns den Leib begraben, BWV 1111, one of the Neumeister Chorales.
