= Georg Andreas Sorge =

German music theorist (1703–1778)

Georg Andreas Sorge (21 March 1703 in Mellenbach, Thuringia – 4 April 1778) was an organist, composer, and, most notably, theorist. His references to Johann Sebastian Bach show that they were friends, and he composed three fugues for organ on the name BACH (BWV Anh. 107, 108 and 110). He joined Lorenz Christoph Mizler's Corresponding Society of Musical Sciences in 1747, just a month after Bach himself.

Sorge's writings on thorough-bass and harmony are very competent, and his theoretical grasp of unequal temperaments excelled even that of J. G. Neidhardt (though still taking 1/12 comma as an indivisible unit of measure. He cited Bach as 'witness' that regular 1/6-comma meantone temperament was inadequate to 'modern' harmony, and he dismissed Johann Philipp Kirnberger's schemes of temperament as 'no good'.

== See also ==
- Schübler Chorales

More information about Sorge and equal temperament see: https://www.academia.edu/5210832/18th_Century_Quotations_Relating_to_J.S._Bach_s_Temperament
