= Franz Karl Praßl =

Austrian theologian, church musician and composer

Franz Karl Praßl (born 28 September 1954 in Feldbach) is an Austrian theologian, church musician and composer.
