= Psalm 12 =

Twelfth psalm of the Book of Psalms

- "Help, LORD; for the godly man ceaseth"
- Psalm of lament
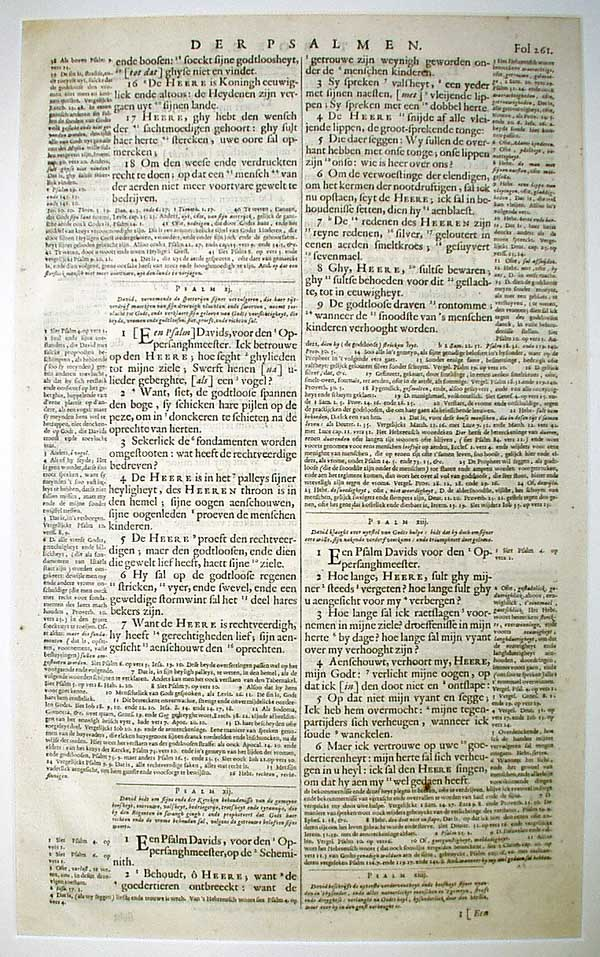
- Psalm 12 in the 17th-century Elsevier bible
- Other name: Psalm 11; "Salvum me fac"
- Language: Hebrew (original)

Psalm 12
- ← Psalm 11 Psalm 13 →
- Book: Book of Psalms
- Hebrew Bible part: Ketuvim
- Order in the Hebrew part: 1
- Category: Sifrei Emet
- Christian Bible part: Old Testament
- Order in the Christian part: 19

Psalm 12 is the twelfth psalm of the Book of Psalms, beginning in English in the King James Version: "Help, LORD; for the godly man ceaseth; for the faithful fail from among the children of men." In the slightly different numbering of the Greek Septuagint and the Latin Vulgate, it is Psalm 11, "Salvum me fac". Its authorship is traditionally assigned to King David.

The psalm forms a regular part of Jewish, Catholic, Lutheran, Anglican and other Protestant liturgies. It was set to music by composers including Johann Sebastian Bach.

== Interpretation ==
There is a cry for help amidst evil men: God will cut off flattering lips. Charles Spurgeon vividly describes the finality saying

They will not be able to continue speaking falsely and proudly for over;
a shovelful of earth from the grave-digger’s spade will silence them,
and a terrible display of God’s justice will make them speechless for ever.

An answer to the cry for help comes: God will arise and defend the poor. Many writers have pointed out that it is not at all clear where God said "Because the poor are plundered, because the needy groan, I will now arise". Some suggested some special revelation possibly through David himself, as David claimed "The spirit of God spoke through me" in 2 Samuel 23:2. Other possibilities include Isaiah 33:10, "I will arise", in the context of a greater salvation for Israel, or arising for judgement as in Genesis 18:20-21, where the Lord got up and went down to Sodom because of cries of oppression.

Hope in God's promise that "I will arise and defend the poor" is bolstered by a reminder that God's word is like silver that was purified over and over even 7 times. That help will be apparently deferred in Psalm 13 with cries of 'How long?' David himself, in his final Psalm of blessing for Solomon, urges Solomon to also defend the poor in Psalm 72:4 emulating God.

Man's sinful state is a theme and like the two psalms before it, Psalm 12 ends with an uncomplimentary statement about fallen men in verse 8. The godly man ceases in psalm 12:1, sinful remain in Psalm 14:1-4

The reformation theologian John Calvin, in his commentary on this psalm, interprets the passage as referring to the truthfulness of God in contrast to humanity, saying that the elaboration of God's actions in the psalm reflect promises God had made with the Israelites.

The genre of the psalm is unclear. Jörg Jeremias sees in it most as the "prophetic action liturgy". Hermann Gunkel also speaks of the Psalm as "liturgy". Here "liturgy" means the intention of the performance was for changing voices was in the service.

== Structure ==
Gunkel divides the psalm as follows:

1. Verses 2-2: After a short cry for help, the complaint that falsehood prevails
2. Verses 4-5: desire YHWH may intervene
3. Verse 6: consolation that YHWH salvation appears now
4. Verses 7-9: Answers: praise the word of YHWH

== Text ==
The following table shows the Hebrew text of the Psalm with vowels, alongside the Koine Greek text in the Septuagint and the English translation from the King James Version. Note that the meaning can slightly differ between these versions, as the Septuagint and the Masoretic Text come from different textual traditions. (Note: A 1917 translation directly from Hebrew to English by the Jewish Publication Society can be found here or here, and an 1844 translation directly from the Septuagint by L. C. L. Brenton can be found here. Both translations are in the public domain.) In the Septuagint, this psalm is numbered Psalm 11.

#	Hebrew	English	Greek
(Note: In the Jewish verse numbering, the ascription of this psalm is verse 1, and the rest of the psalm begins from verse 2. However, the Christian verse numbering does not count the ascription as a separate verse.)	לַמְנַצֵּ֥חַ עַֽל־הַשְּׁמִינִ֗ית מִזְמ֥וֹר לְדָוִֽד׃	(To the chief Musician upon Sheminith, A Psalm of David.)	Εἰς τὸ τέλος, ὑπὲρ τῆς ὀγδόης· ψαλμὸς τῷ Δαυΐδ. -
1	הוֹשִׁ֣יעָה יְ֭הֹוָה כִּֽי־גָמַ֣ר חָסִ֑יד כִּי־פַ֥סּוּ אֱ֝מוּנִ֗ים מִבְּנֵ֥י אָדָֽם׃	Help, Lord; for the godly man ceaseth; for the faithful fail from among the children of men.	ΣΩΣΟΝ με, Κύριε, ὅτι ἐκλέλοιπεν ὅσιος, ὅτι ὠλιγώθησαν αἱ ἀλήθειαι ἀπὸ τῶν υἱῶν τῶν ἀνθρώπων.
2	שָׁ֤וְא ׀ יְֽדַבְּרוּ֮ אִ֤ישׁ אֶת־רֵ֫עֵ֥הוּ שְׂפַ֥ת חֲלָק֑וֹת בְּלֵ֖ב וָלֵ֣ב יְדַבֵּֽרוּ׃	They speak vanity every one with his neighbour: with flattering lips and with a double heart do they speak.	μάταια ἐλάλησεν ἕκαστος πρὸς τὸν πλησίον αὐτοῦ, χείλη δόλια ἐν καρδίᾳ, καὶ ἐν καρδίᾳ ἐλάλησε κακά.
3	יַכְרֵ֣ת יְ֭הֹוָה כׇּל־שִׂפְתֵ֣י חֲלָק֑וֹת לָ֝שׁ֗וֹן מְדַבֶּ֥רֶת גְּדֹלֽוֹת׃	The Lord shall cut off all flattering lips, and the tongue that speaketh proud things:	ἐξολοθρεύσαι Κύριος πάντα τὰ χείλη τὰ δόλια καὶ γλῶσσαν μεγαλοῤῥήμονα.
4	אֲשֶׁ֤ר אָמְר֨וּ ׀ לִלְשֹׁנֵ֣נוּ נַ֭גְבִּיר שְׂפָתֵ֣ינוּ אִתָּ֑נוּ מִ֖י אָד֣וֹן לָֽנוּ׃	Who have said, With our tongue will we prevail; our lips are our own: who is lord over us?	τοὺς εἰπόντας· τὴν γλῶσσαν ἡμῶν μεγαλυνοῦμεν, τὰ χείλη ἡμῶν παρ᾿ ἡμῖν ἐστι· τίς ἡμῶν Κύριός ἐστιν;
5	מִשֹּׁ֥ד עֲנִיִּים֮ מֵאֶנְקַ֢ת אֶבְי֫וֹנִ֥ים עַתָּ֣ה אָ֭קוּם יֹאמַ֣ר יְהֹוָ֑ה אָשִׁ֥ית בְּ֝יֵ֗שַׁע יָפִ֥יחַֽ־לֽוֹ׃	For the oppression of the poor, for the sighing of the needy, now will I arise, saith the Lord; I will set him in safety from him that puffeth at him.	ἀπὸ τῆς ταλαιπωρίας τῶν πτωχῶν καὶ ἀπὸ τοῦ στεναγμοῦ τῶν πενήτων, νῦν ἀναστήσομαι, λέγει Κύριος· θήσομαι ἐν σωτηρίῳ, παῤῥησιάσομαι ἐν αὐτῷ.
6	אִ֥מְר֣וֹת יְהֹוָה֮ אֲמָר֢וֹת טְהֹ֫ר֥וֹת כֶּ֣סֶף צָ֭רוּף בַּעֲלִ֣יל לָאָ֑רֶץ מְ֝זֻקָּ֗ק שִׁבְעָתָֽיִם׃	The words of the Lord are pure words: as silver tried in a furnace of earth, purified seven times.	τὰ λόγια Κυρίου λόγια ἁγνά, ἀργύριον πεπυρωμένον, δοκίμιον τῇ γῇ κεκαθαρισμένον ἑπταπλασίως.
7	אַתָּֽה־יְהֹוָ֥ה תִּשְׁמְרֵ֑ם תִּצְּרֶ֓נּוּ ׀ מִן־הַדּ֖וֹר ז֣וּ לְעוֹלָֽם׃	Thou shalt keep them, O Lord, thou shalt preserve them from this generation for ever.	σύ, Κύριε, φυλάξαις ἡμᾶς καὶ διατηρήσαις ἡμᾶς ἀπὸ τῆς γενεᾶς ταύτης καὶ εἰς τὸν αἰῶνα.
8	סָבִ֗יב רְשָׁעִ֥ים יִתְהַלָּכ֑וּן כְּרֻ֥ם זֻ֝לּ֗וּת לִבְנֵ֥י אָדָֽם׃	The wicked walk on every side, when the vilest men are exalted.	κύκλῳ οἱ ἀσεβεῖς περιπατοῦσι· κατὰ τὸ ὕψος σου ἐπολυώρησας τοὺς υἱοὺς τῶν ἀνθρώπων.

== Usage ==
=== Judaism ===
This psalm is recited on Shmini Atzeret and at a brit milah.

=== Catholic Church ===
According to the Rule of St. Benedict (530 AD), Psalm 1 to Psalm 20 were mainly reserved for the office of Prime. This Psalm, 11, was recited or sung at Prime on Wednesdays. A number of monasteries still respect this tradition. In the Liturgy of the Hours, Psalm 12 is now recited on Tuesdays of the first week during the midday office.

=== Coptic Orthodox Church ===
In the Agpeya, the Coptic Church's book of hours, this psalm is prayed in the office of Prime.

=== Book of Common Prayer ===
In the Church of England's Book of Common Prayer, this psalm is appointed to be read on the evening of the second day of the month.

=== Musical settings ===
In 1523, Martin Luther paraphrased Psalm 12 in a hymn, "Ach Gott, vom Himmel sieh darein". Heinrich Schütz wrote a setting of it, SWV 108, for the Becker Psalter, published first in 1628. Johann Sebastian Bach wrote a cantata about it, Ach Gott, vom Himmel sieh darein, BWV 2 in Leipzig in 1724. Felix Mendelssohn also wrote a cantata on "Ach Gott, vom Himmel sieh darein" (MWV A 13), (1832), for baritone, SATB, strings.
