= Chorale prelude =

Type of musical composition

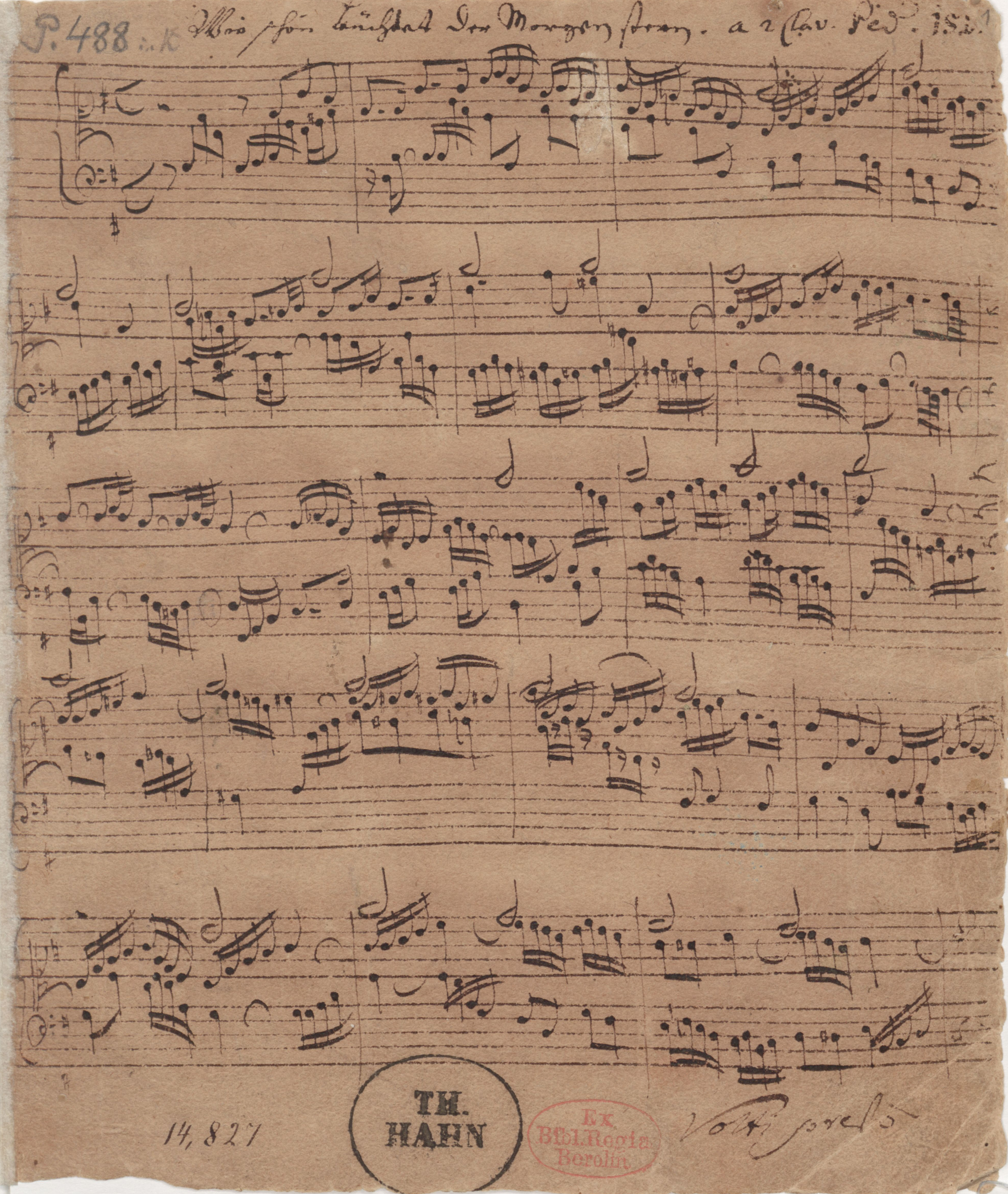
Autograph manuscript of the chorale prelude Wie schön leuchtet der Morgenstern, BWV 739, 1705

In music, a chorale prelude or chorale setting is a short liturgical composition for organ using a chorale tune as its basis. It was a predominant style of the German Baroque era and reached its culmination in the works of J.S. Bach, who wrote 46 (with a 47th unfinished) examples of the form in his Orgelbüchlein, along with multiple other works of the type in other collections.

== Function ==
The precise liturgical function of a chorale prelude in the Baroque period is uncertain and is a subject of debate. One possibility is that they were used to introduce the hymn about to be sung by the congregation, usually in a Protestant, and originally in a Lutheran, church. This assumption may be valid for the shorter chorale preludes (Bach's setting of 'Liebster Jesu, wir sind hier, BWV 731, for example), but many chorale preludes are very long. It could be the case that these were played during special services in churches or in cathedrals.

== Style ==
Chorale preludes are typically polyphonic settings, with a chorale tune, plainly audible and often ornamented, used as cantus firmus. Accompanying motifs are usually derived from contrapuntal manipulations of the chorale melody.

Notable composers of chorale preludes during the Baroque period include Dieterich Buxtehude, Johann Pachelbel and Johann Sebastian Bach. After this period, the form fell out of favour and virtually none were written by subsequent composers, such as Stamitz, J C Bach, Haydn and Mozart, until examples from the late 19th century, including works by Johannes Brahms and Max Reger.

== Baroque period ==
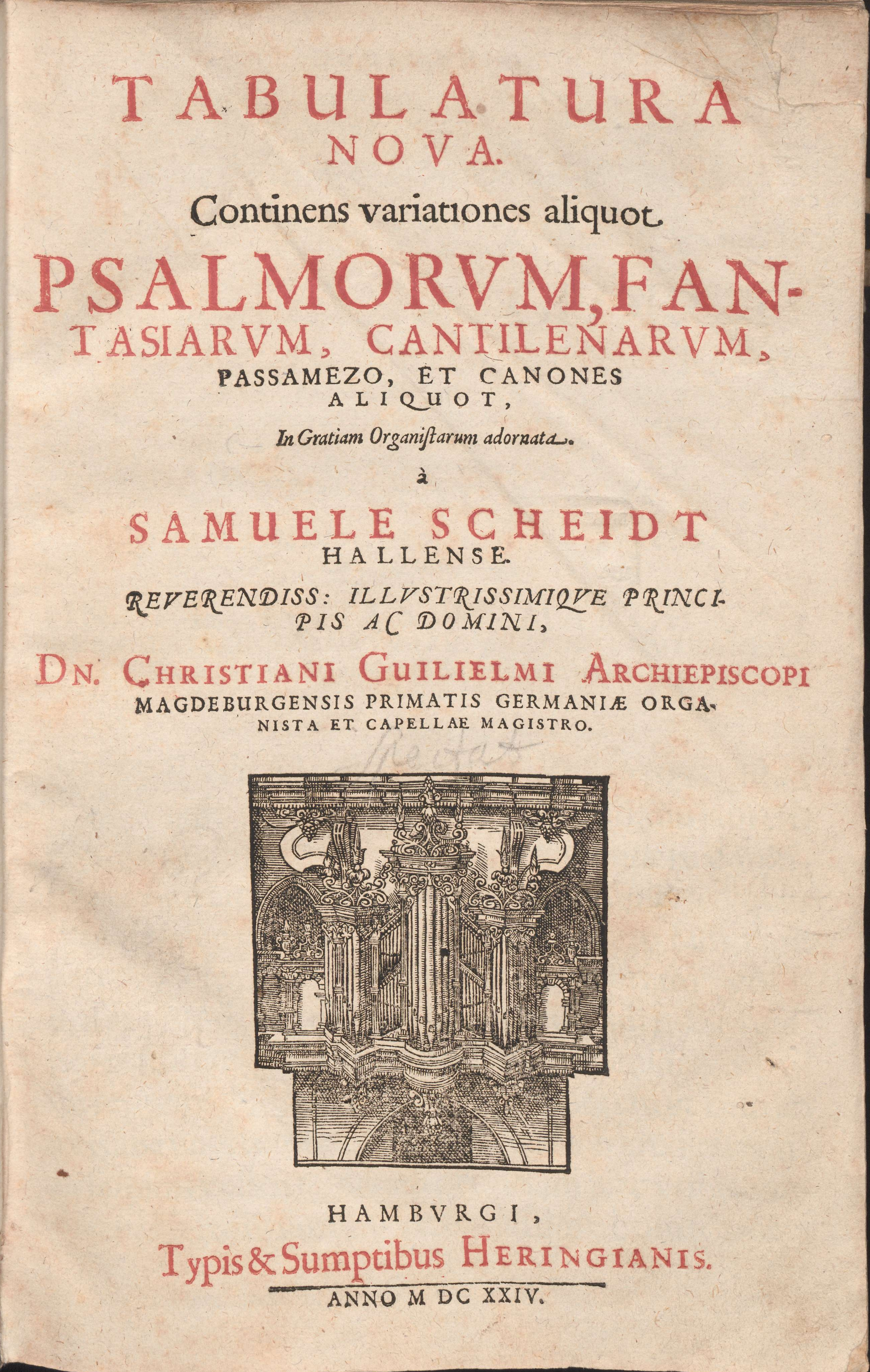
Title page of Scheidt's Tabulatura Nova

O Lamm Gottes unschuldig, BWV 1095
One of the Neumeister Chorales by Johann Sebastian Bach, performed by Ulrich Metzner

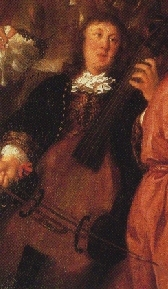
The only known painting of Buxtehude (detail, Johannes Voorhout, 1674)

Among the old masters who wrote chorale preludes is Samuel Scheidt. His Tabulatura Nova, containing several such works, was published in 1624. Sweelinck is also typical of the early Baroque period.

Chorale preludes also appear in the works of Dieterich Buxtehude and Georg Böhm. Over 40 chorale preludes by Buxtehude have survived to this day.

Johann Pachelbel's compositions are another example of the form, with many of his chorale preludes elaborating upon Protestant chorale melodies.

The best-known composer of chorale preludes is Johann Sebastian Bach. His earliest extant compositions, works for organ which he possibly wrote before his fifteenth birthday, include the chorale preludes BWV 700, 724, 1091, 1094, 1097, 1112, 1113 and 1119.

In Bach's early Orgelbüchlein (1708-1717), the chorale melody is usually in the upper part and the accompanying lower parts, while being highly elaborate in their harmonic and contrapuntal detail, the beginnings and endings of phrases generally coincide with those of the chorale. An example is "Jesu, meine Freude", where the chorale melody in the upper part is supported by a closely woven and harmonically subtle counterpoint in three parts:

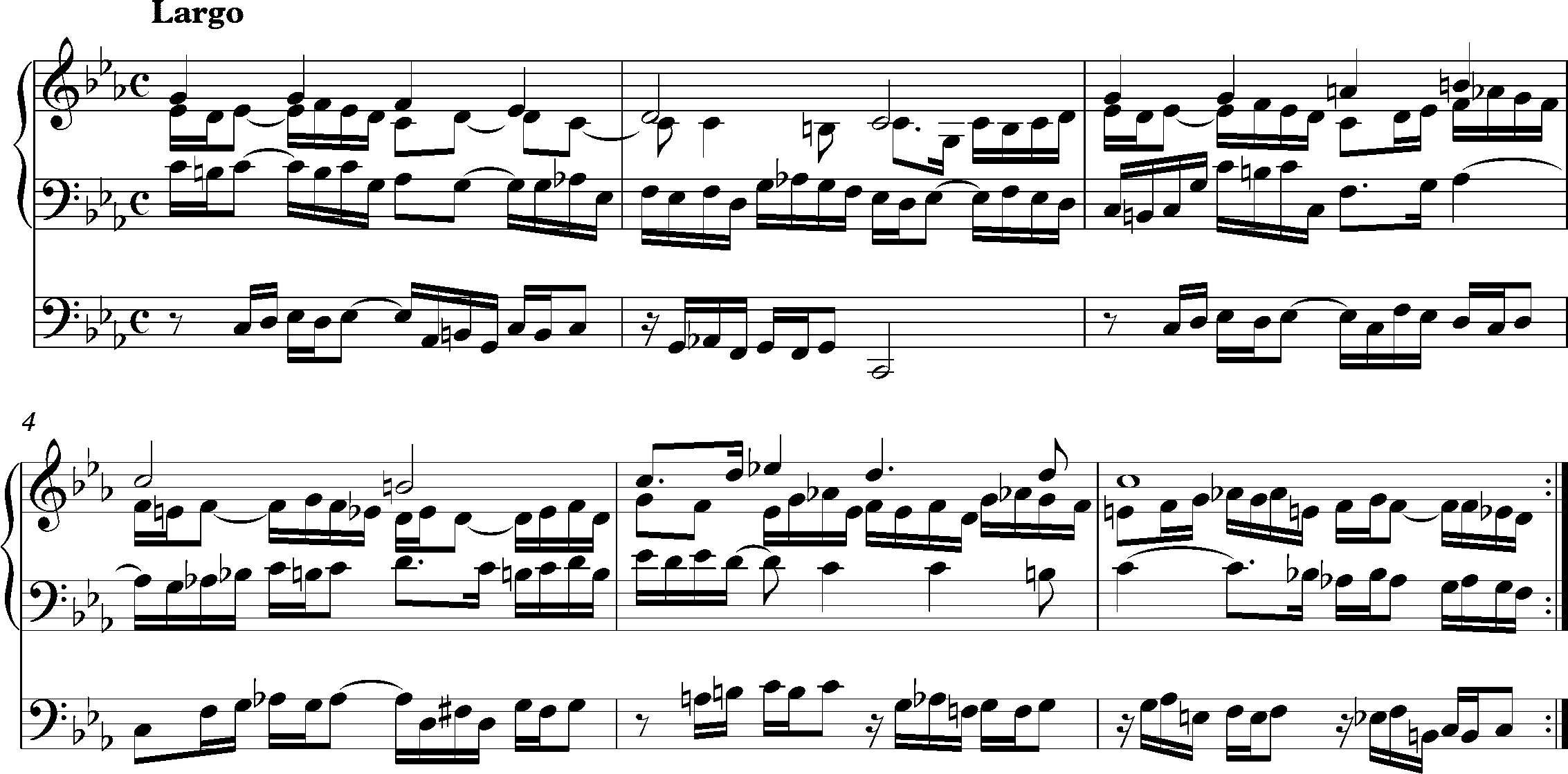
Jesu, meine Freude from the Orgelbuchlein. Jesu meine Freude (BWV 610)

Peter Williams (1972, p. 27) says of the Orgelbüchlein: “Each approach to Bach’s organ chorales – their beauty, their ‘symbolism’, their mastery- is rewarding.” Williams continues (1972, p29) “One of the most remarkable features of most of the settings is that the accompaniment and the motifs from which it is composed are newly invented and are not related thematically to the melody.”

By contrast, in the prelude on Wachet auf, ruft uns die Stimme (BWV 645) from the set of six Schübler Chorales, taken from earlier cantata movements, the accompaniment is a free-flowing obbligato which both derives from the chorale melody, yet seems to float independently over it. "The achieving of a melody independent of the cantus firmus, though in principle it is familiar in obbligato arias, is here unusually complete." Julian Mincham (2010) sees an asymmetry here that is possibly rooted in the chorale itself “with its slightly puzzling mixture of different phrase lengths”:

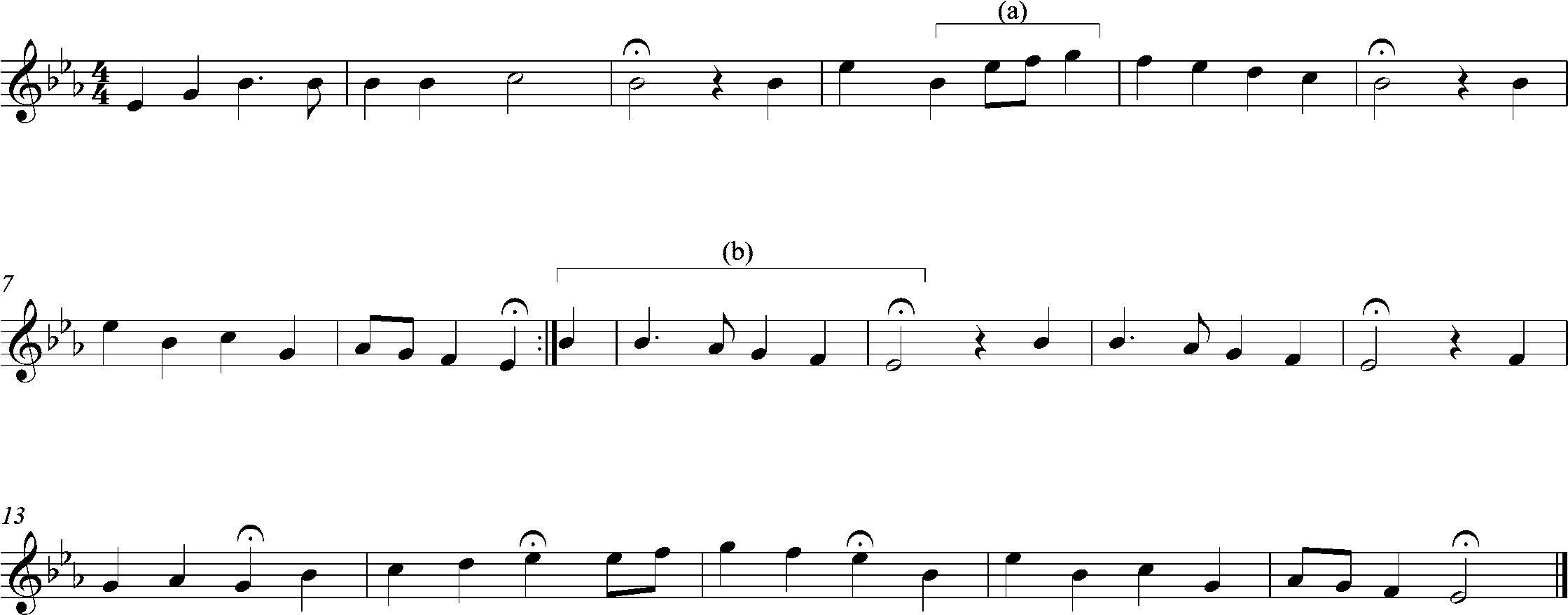
Chorale melody (cantus firmus) of Wachet auf.

Two melodic ideas from the chorale, labelled (a) and (b) above are embedded in the obbligato line:

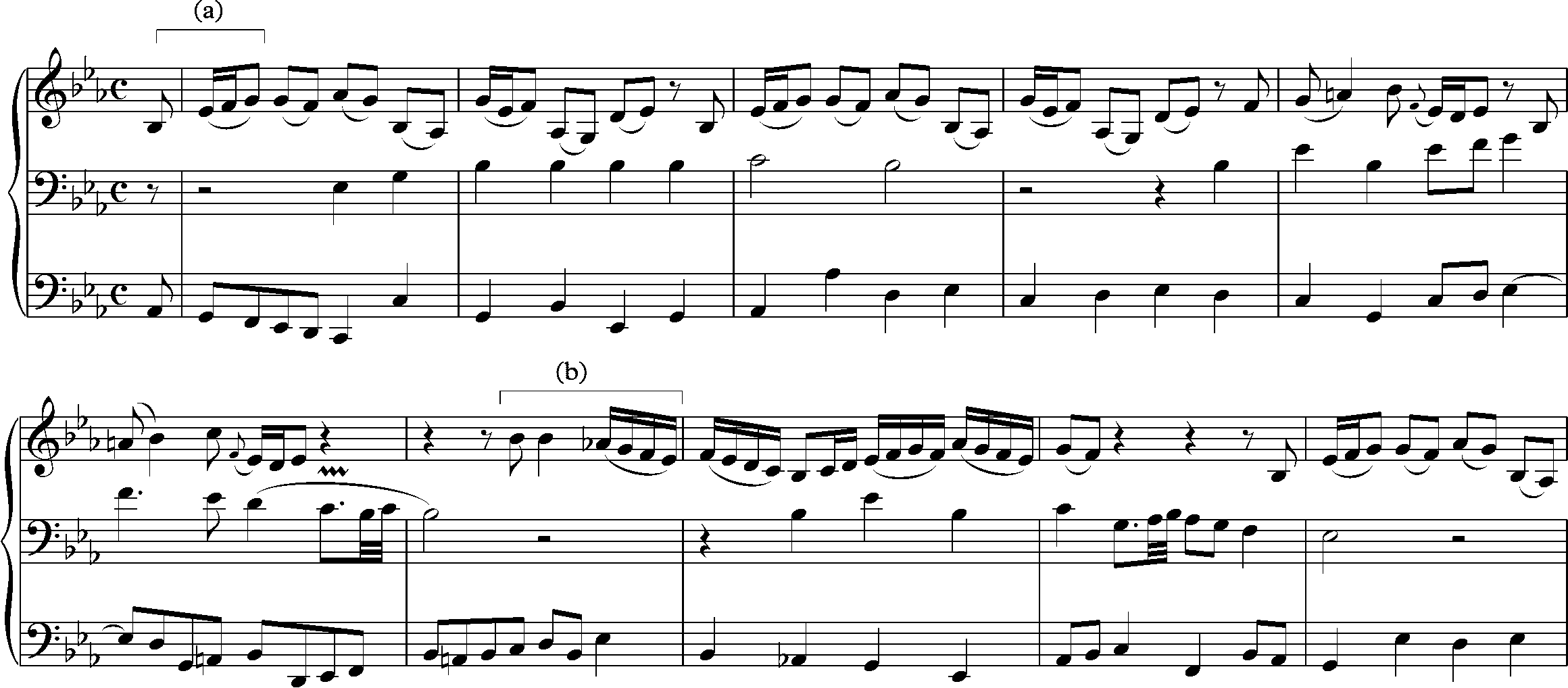
Wachet auf, ruft uns die Stimme (BWV 645)

Mincham says that while “theme and chorale are not designed to begin and end together… [they] fit together perfectly. Get to know the chorale and ritornello melodies well and the apparently effortless ways in which they inter-relate will become obvious. The important point is that they seem not to fit; but they do.”

== Romantic period and twentieth century ==
O Gott, du frommer Gott, Op. 122 No. 7
Performed by Matthias Flierl

There are several examples of 19th- and 20th-century chorale preludes, such as the Eleven Chorale Preludes by Johannes Brahms, César Franck, Max Reger's and Samuel Barber's. Works such as these continue to be produced nowadays such as Helmut Walcha's four volumes and the seven volumes of Flor Peeters.

=== Johannes Brahms ===
See Eleven Chorale Preludes.

=== Max Reger ===
Reger composed, among others, 52 chorale preludes, Op. 67, Chorale Preludes for Organ, Op. 79b (1900–04) and 30 small chorale preludes, Op. 135a (1914).

== See also ==
- Chorale composition
