= Kathleen Ferrier discography =

In the course of her professional life the English contralto Kathleen Ferrier made a large number of recordings. In the summer of 1944 she signed a contract with Columbia, which lasted until February 1946. She then transferred to Decca, and remained with them until her death in October 1953. Apart from her studio recordings, many of her live performances and broadcast recitals were recorded, sometimes privately. Some of these were later issued as commercial recordings; others are held by individuals or in the archives of broadcasting companies.

The following list is neither up to date nor entirely accurate, particularly in regard to a CD issue, entitled 'Kathleen Ferrier Remembered', released in June 2017, on SOMM264, comprising 26 tracks, 19 of which have never previously been issued. Most of these 19 are not listed below. They include Lieder by Schubert, Brahms, Wolf and Mahler and songs by Stanford, Parry, Jacobson and Rubbra, all taken from BBC broadcasts between 1947 and 1952.

In April 2019, a recording of Ferrier singing in Bach's 'Magnificat' during the 1950 Vienna International Bach Festival was issued for the first time. The CD catalogue number is SOMM Ariadne 5004 and it also features Irmgard Seefried and Friedl Riegler (sopranos), Hugo Meyer-Welfing (tenor) and Otto Edelmann (bass). The Vienna Philharmonic Orchestra and Chorus of the Vienna State Opera are conducted by Volkmar Andreae. The existence of this recording was not known until a vinyl disc was offered for sale on an internet auction site in 2018. In superb recorded sound, this discovery is a real treasure and completes the recordings available of the three works in which Ferrier sang at the 1950 Vienna Bach Festival.

Many of Ferrier's recordings were initially issued on 78 rpm discs. In due course these and later recordings were reissued in other formats: Long-playing (LP), cassette tape and compact disc (CD). The tables list only the dates and locations of the initial recordings.

In 2012 Decca issued a 14-CD + 1-DVD boxed set (Kathleen Ferrier: Centenary Edition - The Complete Decca Recordings) which comprises all recordings published by that company, including several important 'off-air' recordings to which they had the rights.

In the same year, EMI issued a 3-CD set (Kathleen Ferrier - The Complete EMI Recordings) comprising all her extant recordings for that company plus two previously unissued takes from the 1949 'Kindertotenlieder' and a complete recording of Gluck's 'Orfeo ed Euridice', to which they had the rights.

Paul Campion's book 'Ferrier - A Career Recorded' (second edition, published by Thames in 2005 and now distributed by Music Sales) contains details of all Ferrier recordings known at the time of publication.

== Studio recordings, 1944–52 ==
Work	Composer	Accompanying forces	When/where recorded	KFE Vol. no.	Notes	Ref.
"What is Life?"	Gluck	Gerald Moore (piano)	London: Abbey Road 30:6:1944		From Orfeo ed Euridice (translated as "Orpheus".)	
Constancy (Op. 3 No. 1)	Brahms	Gerald Moore (piano):	London: Abbey Road 30:6:1944			
Feinsliebchen ("Sweetheart")	Brahms	Gerald Moore (piano)	London: Abbey Road 30:6:1944		From 49 Deutsche Volkslieder	
"My Work is Done"	Elgar	Gerald Moore (piano)	London: Abbey Road 30:6:1944		From The Dream of Gerontius	
"I Will Lay Me Down in Peace"	Greene	Gerald Moore (piano)	London: Abbey Road 30:9:1944			
"O Praise the Lord"	Greene	Gerald Moore (piano)	London: Abbey Road 30:9:1944			
"Spring is Coming"	Handel	Gerald Moore (piano)	London: Abbey Road 24:4:1945		From Ottone	
"Come To Me, Soothing Sleep"	Handel	Gerald Moore (piano)	London: Abbey Road 24:4:1945		From Ottone	
"Sound the Trumpet"	Purcell	Gerald Moore (piano); Isobel Baillie (soprano)	London: Abbey Road 21:9:1945		From The Ode for Queen Mary	
"Let Us Wander"	Purcell	Gerald Moore (piano); Isobel Baillie (soprano)	London: Abbey Road 21:9:1945		From The Indian Queen	
"Shepherd, Leave Decoying"	Purcell	Gerald Moore (piano); Isobel Baillie (soprano)	London: Abbey Road 21:9:1945		From King Arthur	
"I Would that My Love" Op. 63 No, 1	Mendelssohn	Gerald Moore (piano); Isobel Baillie (soprano)	London: Abbey Road 21:9:1945			
"Greeting" Op. 63 No. 3	Mendelssohn	Gerald Moore (piano); Isobel Baillie (soprano)	London: Abbey Road 21:9:1945			
"Have Mercy, Lord, on Me"	Bach	National Symphony Orchestra cond. Malcolm Sargent; David McCallum (violin)	London: Kingsway Hall 6:2:1946	3	From St Matthew Passion ("Erbarme dich")	
"Art Thou Troubled?"	Handel	London Symphony Orchestra cond. Malcolm Sargent	London: Kingsway Hall 27:2:1946	3	From Rodelinda ("Dove sei, amato bene")	
"What is Life?"	Gluck	London Symphony Orchestra cond. Malcolm Sargent	London: Kingsway Hall 27:2:1946	3	From Orfeo ed Euridice	
Stabat Mater	Pergolesi	Joan Taylor (soprano); The Boyd Neel Orchestra cond. Roy Henderson; Nottingham Oriana Choir	London: Broadhurst Gardens 8:5:1946 and 28:5:1946	3		
"O Rest in the Lord"	Mendelssohn	The Boyd Neel Orchestra cond. Boyd Neel	London: Broadhurst Gardens 2:9:1946	3	From Elijah ("Sei stille dem Herrn")	
"Woe unto Them"	Mendelssohn	The Boyd Neel Orchestra cond. Boyd Neel	London: Broadhurst Gardens 2:9:1946	3	From Elijah ("Weh ihnen, dass sie von mir weichen")	
Gretchen am Spinnrade Op. 2	Schubert	Phyllis Spurr (piano)	London: Broadhurst Gardens 14:3:1947	4		
Die junge Nonne Op. 43 No. 1	Schubert	Phyllis Spurr (piano)	London: Broadhurst Gardens 14:3:1947	4		
Orfeo ed Euridice	Gluck	Soloists; Southern Philharmonic Orchestra cond. Fritz Stiedry; Glyndebourne Festival Chorus	London: Broadhurst Gardens 22, 23 and 29:6:1947	1	"Concise" version (although main arias are uncut)	
St Matthew Passion	Bach	Soloists; The Jacques Orchestra cond. Reginald Jacques; The Bach Choir;	London: Kingsway Hall 30:6:47 and 4:7:47		Ferrier's arias from abridged version	
Vier ernste Gesänge	Brahms	Phyllis Spurr (piano)	London: Broadhurst Gardens 7/8:10:1947		Not issued	
Gestillte Sehnsucht Op. 91 No. 1	Brahms	Phyllis Spurr (piano); Max Gilbert (viola)	London: Broadhurst Gardens 9:12:1947		Not issued	
Geistliches Wiegenlied Op. 91 No. 2	Brahms	Phyllis Spurr (piano); Max Gilbert (viola)	London: Broadhurst Gardens 9:12:1947		Not issued	
Rhapsody for contralto, male chorus and orchestra (Alto Rhapsody)	Brahms	London Philharmonic Orchestra cond. Clemens Krauss; London Philharmonic Choir	London: Kingsway Hall 18,19:12:1947	10		
St Matthew Passion	Bach	Soloists; The Jacques Orchestra cond. Reginald Jacques; The Bach Choir;	London: Kingsway Hall 3:5:1948 – 11:6:1948	2	Ferrier's arias from almost complete version	
Ombra mai fu	Handel	London Symphony Orchestra cond. Sir Malcolm Sargent	London: Kingsway Hall 14:5:1948		From Xerxes. Not issued	
Gestillte Sehnsucht Op. 91 No. 1	Brahms	Phyllis Spurr (piano); Max Gilbert (viola)	London: Broadhurst Gardens 22:6:1948		Repeat of session 9:12:1947. Again not issued	
Geistliches Wiegenlied Op. 91 No. 2	Brahms	Phyllis Spurr (piano); Max Gilbert (viola)	London: Broadhurst Gardens 22:6:1948		Repeat of session 9:12:1947. Again not issued	
"Silent Night"	Gruber	Boyd Neel String Orchestra cond. Boyd Neel	London: Broadhurst Gardens 6:8:1948	4		
"O Come, All Ye Faithful"	Traditional	Boyd Neel String Orchestra cond. Boyd Neel	London: Broadhurst Gardens 6:8:1948	4		
Fronde tenere...Ombra mai fu	Handel	London Symphony Orchestra cond. Sir Malcolm Sargent	London: Kingsway Hall 7:10:1948	3	From Xerxes Retake of session on 14:5:1948	
"Blow the Wind Southerly"	Traditional	Unaccompanied	London: Broadhurst Gardens 10:2:1949	8		
"My Bonny Lad"	Traditional	Phyllis Spurr (piano)	London: Broadhurst Gardens 10:2:1949	8		
"The keel row"	Traditional	Phyllis Spurr (piano)	London: Broadhurst Gardens 10:2:1949	8		
"Have You Seen but a Whyte Lillie Grow"	Traditional	Phyllis Spurr (piano)	London: Broadhurst Gardens 10:2:1949	8		
"Willow, Willow"	Traditional	Phyllis Spurr (piano)	London: Broadhurst Gardens 10:2:1949			
"The Lover's Curse"	Traditional	Phyllis Spurr (piano)	London: Broadhurst Gardens 10:2:1949	8		
"Down by the salley gardens"	Traditional	Phyllis Spurr (piano)	London: Broadhurst Gardens 10:2:1949	8		
Der Musensohn D. 764 Op. 92 No. 1	Schubert	Phyllis Spurr (piano)	London: Broadhurst Gardens 14:2:1949		Not issued	
An die Musik D. 547 Op. 88 No. 4	Schubert	Phyllis Spurr (piano)	London: Broadhurst Gardens 14:2:1949	4		
Gestillte Sehnsucht Op. 91 No, 1	Brahms	Phyllis Spurr (piano); Max Gilbert (viola)	London: Broadhurst Gardens 15:2:1949	10	Repeat of session 22:6:1948	
Geistliches Wiegenlied Op. 91 No. 2	Brahms	Phyllis Spurr (piano); Max Gilbert (viola)	London: Broadhurst Gardens 15:2:1949	10	Repeat of session 22:6:1948	
Kindertotenlieder	Mahler	Vienna Philharmonic Orchestra cond. Bruno Walter	London: Kingsway Hall 4:10:1949	Ferrier's only commercial recording for EMI after 1945		
Cantata No. 11: Praise our God	Bach	Soloists; The Jacques Orchestra cond. Reginald Jacques; The Cantata Singers; Thornton Lofthouse (harpsichord)	London: Kingsway Hall 1.11 49	3	Ascension Oratorio	
Cantata No. 67: Hold in Affection Jesus Christ	Bach	Soloists; The Jacques Orchestra cond. Reginald Jacques; The Cantata Singers; Thornton Lofthouse (harpsichord); Osborne Peasgood (organ)	London: Kingsway Hall 3.11 49		Halt im Gedächtnis Jesum Christ, BWV 67	
Sapphische Ode Op. 94 No. 4	Brahms	Phyllis Spurr (piano)	London: Broadhurst Gardens 19:12:1949	4		
Botschaft Op. 47 No. 1	Brahms	Phyllis Spurr (piano)	London: Broadhurst Gardens 19:12:1949	4		
Der Musensohn Op. 92 No. 1	Schubert	Phyllis Spurr (piano)	London: Broadhurst Gardens 19:12:1949	4		
Frauenliebe und -leben Op. 42	Schumann	John Newmark (piano)	London: Broadhurst Gardens 12:7:1950	4		
"Seit ich ihn gesehn" "Er der Herrlichste von allen"	Schumann	John Newmark (piano)	London: Broadhurst Gardens 12:7:1950	4		
"Ich kann's nicht fassen, nicht glauben" "Du Ring an meinem Finger"	Schumann	John Newmark (piano)	London: Broadhurst Gardens 12:7:1950	4		
"Helft mir, ihr Schwestern" "Süßer Freund, du blickest"	Schumann	John Newmark (piano)	London: Broadhurst Gardens 14:7:1950	4		
"An meinem Herzen, an meiner Brust" "Nun hast du mir den ersten Schmerz getan"	Schumann	John Newmark (piano)	London: Broadhurst Gardens 14:7:1950	4		
Widmung Op. 25 No. 1	Schumann	John Newmark (piano)	London: Broadhurst Gardens 14:7:1950	4		
Volksliedchen Op. 51 No. 2	Schumann	John Newmark (piano)	London: Broadhurst Gardens 14:7:1950	4		
Vier ernste Gesänge Op. 121	Brahms	John Newmark (piano)	London: Broadhurst Gardens 17:7:1950	10		
'"The Fidgety Bairn"	Traditional	John Newmark (piano)	London: Broadhurst Gardens 17:7:1950	8		
"Ca' the Yowes"	Traditional	John Newmark (piano)	London: Broadhurst Gardens 14:7:1950	8		
"O Waly, Waly"	Traditional	Phyllis Spurr (piano)	London: Broadhurst Gardens 10:12:1951			
"I Have a Bonnet Trimmed with Blue	Traditional	Phyllis Spurr (piano)	London: Broadhurst Gardens 10:12:1951	8		
"My Boy Willie"	Traditional	Phyllis Spurr (piano)	London: Broadhurst Gardens 10:12:1951	8		
"I Will Walk With My Love"	Traditional	Phyllis Spurr (piano)	London: Broadhurst Gardens 10:12:1951	8		
"The Stuttering Lovers"	Traditional	Phyllis Spurr (piano)	London: Broadhurst Gardens 10:12:1951	8		
"Now Sleeps the Crimson Petal"	Quilter	Phyllis Spurr (piano)	London: Broadhurst Gardens 10:12:1951	8		
"I Know Where I'm Going"	Traditional	Phyllis Spurr (piano)	London: Broadhurst Gardens 11:12:1951	8		
"The Fair House of Joy"	Quilter	Phyllis Spurr (piano)	London: Broadhurst Gardens 11:12:1951	8		
"To Daisies"	Quilter	Phyllis Spurr (piano)	London: Broadhurst Gardens 11:12:1951	8		
"Over the Mountains"	Traditional	Phyllis Spurr (piano)	London: Broadhurst Gardens 12:12:1951	8		
"Ye Banks and ye Braes"	Robert Burns	Phyllis Spurr (piano)	London: Broadhurst Gardens 12:12:1951	8		
"Drink to Me Only with Thine Eyes"	Traditional	Phyllis Spurr (piano)	London: Broadhurst Gardens 12:12:1951	8		
Das Lied von der Erde	Mahler	Soloist; Vienna Philharmonic Orchestra cond. Bruno Walter	Vienna: Grosser Musikvereinssaal 15?,16:5:1952			
Three Rückert Songs	Mahler	Vienna Philharmonic Orchestra cond. Bruno Walter	Vienna: Grosser Musikvereinssaal 20?:5:1952	10		
"Grief for Sin" from St John Passion	Bach	London Philharmonic Orchestra cond. Sir Adrian Boult Basil Lam (Harpsichord)	London: Kingsway Hall 7:10:1952	7	"(Von den Stricken meiner Sünden")	
"All is Fulfilled" from St John Passion	Bach	London Philharmonic Orchestra cond. Sir Adrian Boult; Basil Lam (Harpsichord); Ambrose Gauntlet (Viola da gamba)	London: Kingsway Hall 7:10:1952	7	"(Es ist vollbracht")	
Qui sedes from Mass in B minor	Bach	London Philharmonic Orchestra cond. Sir Adrian Boult; Basil Lam (Harpsichord); Michael Dobson (Oboe d'amore)	London: Kingsway Hall 7:10:1952	7		
Agnus Dei from Mass in B minor	Bach	London Philharmonic Orchestra cond. Sir Adrian Boult; Basil Lam (Harpsichord)	London: Kingsway Hall 7:10:1952	7		
"O Thou That Tellest" from Messiah	Handel	London Philharmonic Orchestra cond. Sir Adrian Boult; Basil Lam (Harpsichord)	London: Kingsway Hall 8:10:1952	7		
"Father of Heaven" from Judas Maccabaeus	Handel	London Philharmonic Orchestra cond. Sir Adrian Boult; Basil Lam (Harpsichord)	London: Kingsway Hall 8:10:1952	7		
"He Was Despised" from Messiah	Handel	London Philharmonic Orchestra cond. Sir Adrian Boult; Basil Lam (Harpsichord)	London: Kingsway Hall 8:10:1952	7		
"Return, O God of Hosts" from Samson	Handel	London Philharmonic Orchestra cond. Sir Adrian Boult; Basil Lam (Harpsichord)	London: Kingsway Hall 8:10:1952			

== Recordings of broadcasts and live performances, 1945–53 ==
Work	Composer	Accompanying forces	When/where recorded	KFE Vol. no.	Notes	Ref.
On the Field of Kulikovo	Shaporin	Soloists, BBC Symphony Orchestra, BBC Choral Society cond. Albert Coates	London: Maida Vale 7:11:1945		BBC recording of broadcast. Not commercially issued	
The Rape of Lucretia	Britten	Soloists; Glyndebourne Opera Orchestra cond. Oppenheim?	Stadsschouwburg Amsterdam: 4?:10:1946		Dutch Radio recording of a live performances	
The Rape of Lucretia	Britten	Soloists; Glyndebourne Opera Orchestra cond. Reginald Goodall	London: Camden Hippodrome 11:10:1946		Private recording of live performance; a shorter version of the score than the above performance	
"Song of Songs"	Jacobson	Frederick Stone (piano)	London: Maida Vale 3:11:1947		Recording of live BBC broadcast, issued on SOMM 264 in June 2017	
"Three Psalms: 6, 23 and 150"	Rubbra	Frederick Stone (piano)	London: Maida Vale 3:11:1947		Recording of live BBC broadcast, issued on SOMM 264 in June 2017	
Symphony No. 9 in D minor Op. 125	Beethoven	Soloists; London Philharmonic Orchestra cond. Bruno Walter; London Philharmonic Choir	London: Royal Albert Hall 13:11:1947		Recording of live BBC broadcast, in Swedish National Radio archives	
Symphony No. 3 in D minor	Mahler	BBC Symphony Orchestra cond. Sir Adrian Boult; Mixed choirs	London: Maida Vale 29:11:1947		Privately made recording of BBC broadcast	
Das Lied von der Erde	Mahler	Soloist; New York Philharmonic Orchestra cond. Bruno Walter	New York: Carnegie Hall 18:1:1948		Recording of live WCBS broadcast	
Four Poems of St Teresa of Avila	Berkeley	String orchestra cond. Arnold Goldsborough	London: 4:4:1948 (location uncertain, possibly Aeolian Hall)		Recording of a live BBC broadcast	
"Love Is a Bable"	Parry	Gerald Moore (piano)	Edinburgh: Freemasons' Hall 26:8:1948		Recording of live BBC broadcast from Edinburgh Festival	
Four Serious Songs	Brahms arr Sargent	BBC Symphony Orchestra cond. Sir Malcolm Sargent	London: Royal Albert Hall 12:1:1949	5	Recording of live BBC broadcast	
Spring Symphony Op 44 World premiere	Britten	Soloists; Concertgebouw Orchestra cond. Eduard van Beinum	Amsterdam: Concertgebouw 14:7:1949		Private recording presented by Lord Harewood to National Sound Archive	
Die junge Nonne	Schubert	Bruno Walter (piano)	Edinburgh: Usher Hall 7:9:1949	9	Recording of live BBC broadcast from Edinburgh Festival	
Der Vollmund strahlt	Schubert	Bruno Walter (piano)	Edinburgh: Usher Hall 7:9:1949	9	Recording of live BBC broadcast from Edinburgh Festival	
Du liebst mich nicht	Schubert	Bruno Walter (piano)	Edinburgh: Usher Hall 7:9:1949	9	Recording of live BBC broadcast from Edinburgh Festival	
Der Tod und das Mädchen	Schubert	Bruno Walter (piano)	Edinburgh: Usher Hall 7:9:1949	9	Recording of live BBC broadcast from Edinburgh Festival	
Suleika 1	Schubert	Bruno Walter (piano)	Edinburgh: Usher Hall 7:9:1949	9	Recording of live BBC broadcast from Edinburgh Festival	
Du bist die Ruh	Schubert	Bruno Walter (piano)	Edinburgh: Usher Hall 7:9:1949	9	Recording of live BBC broadcast from Edinburgh Festival	
Frauenliebe und -leben	Schumann	Bruno Walter (piano)	Edinburgh: Usher Hall 7:9:1949	9	Recording of live BBC broadcast from Edinburgh Festival	
"Immer leiser wird mein Schlummer"	Brahms	Bruno Walter (piano)	Edinburgh: Usher Hall 7:9:1949	9	Recording of live BBC broadcast from Edinburgh Festival	
Der Tod, das ist die kühle Nacht	Brahms	Bruno Walter (piano)	Edinburgh: Usher Hall 7:9:1949	9	Recording of live BBC broadcast from Edinburgh Festival	
Botschaft	Brahms	Bruno Walter (piano)	Edinburgh: Usher Hall 7:9:1949	9	Recording of live BBC broadcast from Edinburgh Festival	
Von ewiger Liebe	Brahms	Bruno Walter (piano)	Edinburgh: Usher Hall 7:9:1949	9	Recording of live BBC broadcast from Edinburgh Festival	
Alto Rhapsody Op. 53	Brahms	Danish Radio Symphony Orchestra and chorus cond. Fritz Busch;	Copenhagen: Denmark Radio Studio 1 6:10:1949		Incomplete recording of radio broadcast	
Von ewiger Liebe Op. 43 No. 1	Brahms	Phyllis Spurr (piano)	Copenhagen: Denmark Radio Studio 1 6:10:1949		Incomplete recording of radio broadcast	
Wir wandelten Op. 96 No. 2	Brahms	Phyllis Spurr (piano)	Copenhagen: Denmark Radio Studio 1 6:10:1949		Incomplete recording of radio broadcast	
Alto Rhapsody Op. 53	Brahms	Oslo Philharmonic Orchestra and Philharmonic Chorus cond. Erik Tuxen;	Oslo: Studio of Norsk Rikskringkasting 14:10:1949		Recording of radio broadcast	
"Hark! The Echoing Air"	Purcell	Phyllis Spurr (piano)	Oslo: Studio of Norsk Rikskringkasting 16:10:1949	6	From The Fairy-Queen; Recording of radio broadcast	
"Like as the Love-lorn Turtle"	Handel	Phyllis Spurr (piano)	Oslo: Studio of Norsk Rikskringkasting 16:10:1949	6	From Atalanta; Recording of radio broadcast	
"How Changed the Vision"	Handel	Phyllis Spurr (piano)	Oslo: Studio of Norsk Rikskringkasting 16:10:1949	6	From Admeto; Recording of radio broadcast	
"Mad Bess of Bedlam"	Purcell	Phyllis Spurr (piano)	Oslo: Studio of Norsk Rikskringkasting 16:10:1949	6	From Choice Ayres and Songs; Recording of radio broadcast	
Verborgenheit: Mörike-Lieder No. 12	Wolf	Phyllis Spurr (piano)	Oslo: Studio of Norsk Rikskringkasting 16:10:1949	6	Recording of radio broadcast	
Der Gärtner: Mörike-Lieder No. 17	Wolf	Phyllis Spurr (piano)	Oslo: Studio of Norsk Rikskringkasting 16:10:1949	6	Recording of radio broadcast	
Auf ein altes Bild: Mörike-Lieder No. 23	Wolf	Phyllis Spurr (piano)	Oslo: Studio of Norsk Rikskringkasting 16:10:1949	6	Recording of radio broadcast	
Auf einer Wanderung: Mörike-Lieder No. 15	Wolf	Phyllis Spurr (piano)	Oslo: Studio of Norsk Rikskringkasting 16:10:1949	6	Recording of radio broadcast	
Altar	L I Jensen	Phyllis Spurr (piano)	Oslo: Studio of Norsk Rikskringkasting 16:10:1949	6	Recording of radio broadcast	
Vergiss mein nicht	Bach	Millicent Silver (harpsichord)	London: Maida Vale 15:12:1949	6	Recording of BBC broadcast	
Ach dass nicht die letzte Stunde	Bach	Millicent Silver (harpsichord)	London: Maida Vale 15:12:1949	6	Recording of BBC broadcast	
Kleine Kantate von Wald und Au	Telemann	Millicent Silver (harpsichord); John Francis (flute) George Roth (cello)	London: Maida Vale 15:12:1949		Recording of BBC broadcast	
Bist du bei mir from The Anna Magdalena Song Book	Gottfried Heinrich Stölzel then attributed to Bach	John Newmark (piano)	New York: Town Hall 8:1:1950	6		
Four Serious Songs Op. 121	Brahms	John Newmark (piano)	New York: Town Hall 8:1:1950		First issued commercially by Decca in 2012	
Orfeo ed Euridice	Gluck	Soloists; The Little Orchestra Society cond. Thomas Scherman	New York: Town Hall 17:3:1950		Extracts first issued by Decca in 2012	
St Matthew Passion	Bach	Soloists; Vienna Symphony Orchestra cond. Herbert von Karajan; Wiener Singverein; Alois Forer and Anton Heiler (organ)	Vienna: Musikvereinssaal 9:6:1950		Recorded from an Austrian radio broadcast	
Mass in B Minor (excerpts)	Bach	Vienna Symphony Orchestra cond. Herbert von Karajan	Vienna: Musikvereinssaal 13 or 14:6:1950		Recording during rehearsals for broadcast performance 15:6:1950	
Mass in B Minor	Bach	Soloists; Vienna Symphony Orchestra cond. Herbert von Karajan; Wiener Singverein; Alois Forer and Anton Heiler (organ); Karl Pilss (harpsichord)	Vienna: Musikvereinssaal 15:6:1950		Recording of broadcast performance	
Where You Walk from Semele	Handel	Giorgio Favaretto (piano)	Milan: Probably RAI Studios 6:2:1951		Recording of broadcast recital	
"Like as the Love-lorn Turtle" from Atalanta	Handel	Giorgio Favaretto (piano)	Milan: Probably RAI Studios 6:2:1951		Recording of broadcast recital	
"Hark! The Echoing Air" from The Fairy-Queen	Purcell	Giorgio Favaretto (piano)	Milan: Probably RAI Studios 6:2:1951	6	Recording of broadcast recital	
"Lasciatemi morire" from Arianna	Monteverdi	Giorgio Favaretto (piano)	Milan: Probably RAI Studios 6:2:1951		Recording of broadcast recital	
Pur dicesti	Lotti	Giorgio Favaretto (piano)	Milan: Probably RAI Studios 6:2:1951		Recording of broadcast recital	
Che farò from Orfeo ed Euridice	Gluck	Giorgio Favaretto (piano)	Milan: Probably RAI Studios 6:2:1951		Recording of broadcast recital	
Lachen und Weinen Op. 59 No. 4	Schubert	Giorgio Favaretto (piano)	Milan: Probably RAI Studios 6:2:1951		Recording of broadcast recital	
Sonntag Op. 47 No. 3	Brahms	Giorgio Favaretto (piano)	Milan: Probably RAI Studios 6:2:1951		Recording of broadcast recital	
"Love Is a Bable" Op. 152 No. 3	Parry	Giorgio Favaretto (piano)	Milan: Probably RAI Studios 6:2:1951		Recording of broadcast recital	
"The Fairy Lough" Op. 77 No. 2	Stanford	Giorgio Favaretto (piano)	Milan: Probably RAI Studios 6:2:1951		Recording of broadcast recital	
"Ca' the Yowes"	Traditional	Giorgio Favaretto (piano)	Milan: Probably RAI Studios 6:2:1951		Recording of broadcast recital	
"The Spanish lady"	Traditional	Giorgio Favaretto (piano)	Milan: Probably RAI Studios 6:2:1951		Recording of broadcast recital	
Poème de l'amour et de la mer Op. 19	Chausson	Hallé Orchestra cond. Sir John Barbirolli	Manchester: Milton Hall 9:3:51	5	Recording of broadcast recital	
Orfeo ed Euridice	Gluck	Soloists; Netherlands Opera Orchestra and Chorus, cond. Charles Bruck	Amsterdam: Stadsschouwburg, 10:7:1951		Recording of Dutch Radio broadcast	
Kindertotenlieder	Mahler	Concertgebouw Orchestra cond. Otto Klemperer	Amsterdam: Concertgebouw 12:7:1951		Recording from broadcast concert	
Symphony No. 2	Mahler	Soloist; Concertgebouw Orchestra cond. Otto Klemperer; Amsterdam Koonkunstkoor	Amsterdam: Concertgebouw 12:7:1951		Recording from broadcast concert	
Mass in B minor	Bach	Soloists; Boyd Neel Orchestra cond. Georges Enescu; BBC Chorus; George Malcolm (harpsichord)	London: Broadcasting House 17:7:1951		Recording of BBC radio broadcast.	
"Land of Hope and Glory"	Elgar	Hallé Orchestra cond. Sir John Barbirolli	Manchester: Free Trade Hall 16:11:1951		Recording of a BBC radio broadcast	
Ganymed Op. 19 No. 3	Schubert	Benjamin Britten (piano)	London: Maida Vale 4:2:1952	4	Part of a recital which was broadcast 13 May 1952	
Du liebst mich nicht Op. 59 No. 1	Schubert	Benjamin Britten (piano)	London: Maida Vale 4:2:1952	4	Part of a recital which was broadcast 13 May 1952	
Lachen und Weinen Op. 59 No. 4	Schubert	Benjamin Britten (piano)	London: Maida Vale 4:2:1952	4	Part of a recital which was broadcast 13 May 1952	
Ruhe Süssliebchen in Schatten from Die schöne Magelone Op. 33 No. 9	Brahms	Frederick Stone (piano)	London: Broadcasting House 2:4:1952		Recording of broadcast recital	
Auf dem See Op. 59 No. 2	Brahms	Frederick Stone (piano)	London: Broadcasting House 2:4:1952		Recording of broadcast recital	
Wir wandelten Op. 96 No. 2	Brahms	Frederick Stone (piano)	London: Broadcasting House 2:4:1952		Recording of broadcast recital. Not commercially issued.	
Es Schauen die Blumen Op. 96 No. 3	Brahms	Frederick Stone (piano)	London: Broadcasting House 2:4:1952		Recording of broadcast recital	
Der Jäger Op. 95 No. 4	Brahms	Frederick Stone (piano)	London: Broadcasting House 2:4:1952		Recording of broadcast recital	
Das Lied von der Erde	Mahler	Soloist; Hallé Orchestra cond. Sir John Barbirolli	Manchester: Milton Hall 22:4:1952		Private recording of broadcast concert.	
"The Fairy Lough" Op. 77 No. 2	Stanford	Frederick Stone (piano)	London: Broadcasting House 5:6:1952	6	recording issued June 1954, royalties to Kathleen Ferrier Cancer Research Fund	
"A Soft Day" Op. 140 No. 3	Stanford	Frederick Stone (piano)	London: Broadcasting House 5:6:1952	6	recording issued June 1954, royalties to Kathleen Ferrier Cancer Research Fund	
"Love Is a Bable"	Parry	Frederick Stone (piano)	London: Broadcasting House 5:6:1952	6	recording issued June 1954, royalties to Kathleen Ferrier Cancer Research Fund	
"Silent Noon"	Vaughan Williams	Frederick Stone (piano)	London: Broadcasting House 5:6:1952		recording issued June 1954, royalties to Kathleen Ferrier Cancer Research Fund	
"Go not, Happy Day"	Bridge	Frederick Stone (piano)	London: Broadcasting House 5:6:1952	6	recording issued June 1954, royalties to Kathleen Ferrier Cancer Research Fund	
"Sleep"	Warlock	Frederick Stone (piano)	London: Broadcasting House 5:6:1952	6	recording issued June 1954, royalties to Kathleen Ferrier Cancer Research Fund	
"Pretty Ring Time"	Warlock	Frederick Stone (piano)	London: Broadcasting House 5:6:1952	6	recording issued June 1954, royalties to Kathleen Ferrier Cancer Research Fund	
"O Waly, Waly"	Traditional	Frederick Stone (piano)	London: Broadcasting House 5:6:1952	6	recording issued June 1954, royalties to Kathleen Ferrier Cancer Research Fund	
"Come You not from Newcastle"	Traditional	Frederick Stone (piano)	London: Broadcasting House 5:6:1952	6	recording issued June 1954, royalties to Kathleen Ferrier Cancer Research Fund	
"Kitty my Love"	Traditional	Frederick Stone (piano)	London: Broadcasting House 5:6:1952	6	recording issued June 1954, royalties to Kathleen Ferrier Cancer Research Fund	
Three Vocal Quartets	Brahms	Soloists; Hans Gál (piano)	Edinburgh: Usher Hall 2:9:1952		Privately recorded	
Liebslieder Waltzer Op. 52	Brahms	Soloists; Hans Gál and Clifford Curzon (piano)	Edinburgh: Usher Hall 2:9:1952		Recorded at 1952 Edinburgh Festival recital	
Zum Schluss from Neue Liebeslieder Op. 65	Brahms	Soloists; Hans Gál and Clifford Curzon (piano)	Edinburgh: Usher Hall 2:9:1952		Recorded at 1952 Edinburgh Festival recital	
Suleika 1 Op. 14 No. 1	Schubert	Frederick Stone (piano)	London: Maida Vale 29:9:1952		From a broadcast recital shared with Myra Hess	
Der Vollmond strahlt from Rosamunde Op. 26	Schubert	Frederick Stone (piano)	London: Maida Vale 29:9:1952		From a broadcast recital shared with Myra Hess	
Rastlose Liebe Op. 5 No. 1	Schubert	Frederick Stone (piano)	London: Maida Vale 29:9:1952		From a broadcast recital shared with Myra Hess	
Wasserfluth from Winterreise Op. 89 No. 6	Schubert	Frederick Stone (piano)	London: Maida Vale 29:9:1952		From a broadcast recital shared with Myra Hess	
Die junge Nonne Op. 43 No. 1	Schubert	Frederick Stone (piano)	London: Maida Vale 29:9:1952		From a broadcast recital shared with Myra Hess	
"Discovery" Op. 13	Ferguson	Ernest Lush (piano)	London: Maida Vale 12:1:1953	5	Recording of Ferrier's last broadcast recital	
"Red Skies"	Wordsworth	Ernest Lush (piano)	London: Maida Vale 12:1:1953	5	Recording of Ferrier's last broadcast recital	
Three Psalms, Op. 61	Rubbra	Ernest Lush (piano)	London: Maida Vale 12:1:1953	5	Recording of Ferrier's last broadcast recital	

== Footnotes ==
The Appendix to Winifred Ferrier's The Life of Kathleen Ferrier contains "taken from her own notebook, a list of what she sang" (pp. 185–91); under Folk Songs arrangers of some of the songs are recorded, e.g. Whittaker for "Blow the wind southerly".
