= OHC (disambiguation) =

An Overhead camshaft engine, or OHC, is a type of piston engine in which the camshaft is located in the cylinder head above the combustion chamber.

OHC may also refer to:

- Ocean heat content, the thermal energy held in the oceans
- Oetker Hotel Management GmbH, a German hotel management company also known as Oetker Collection
- Ohio Heritage Conference, a high school athletic league in Ohio, U.S.
- Ontario Health Coalition, an organization that advocates publicly funded health care in Ontario, Canada
- Open House Chicago, an annual architecture festival hosted by the Chicago Architecture Foundation
- Order of the Holy Cross, a monastic community
- Organizational health center, an industrial organization in occupational health psychology
- Outer hair cell, a component in the mammalian cochlear amplifier
- Oxford Harmonic Choir

== See also ==
- OHCS, Oregon Housing and Community Services Department
- POHC, reporting mark for the Pittsburgh and Ohio Central Railroad
