= Nikolaus Herman =

German composer and cantor

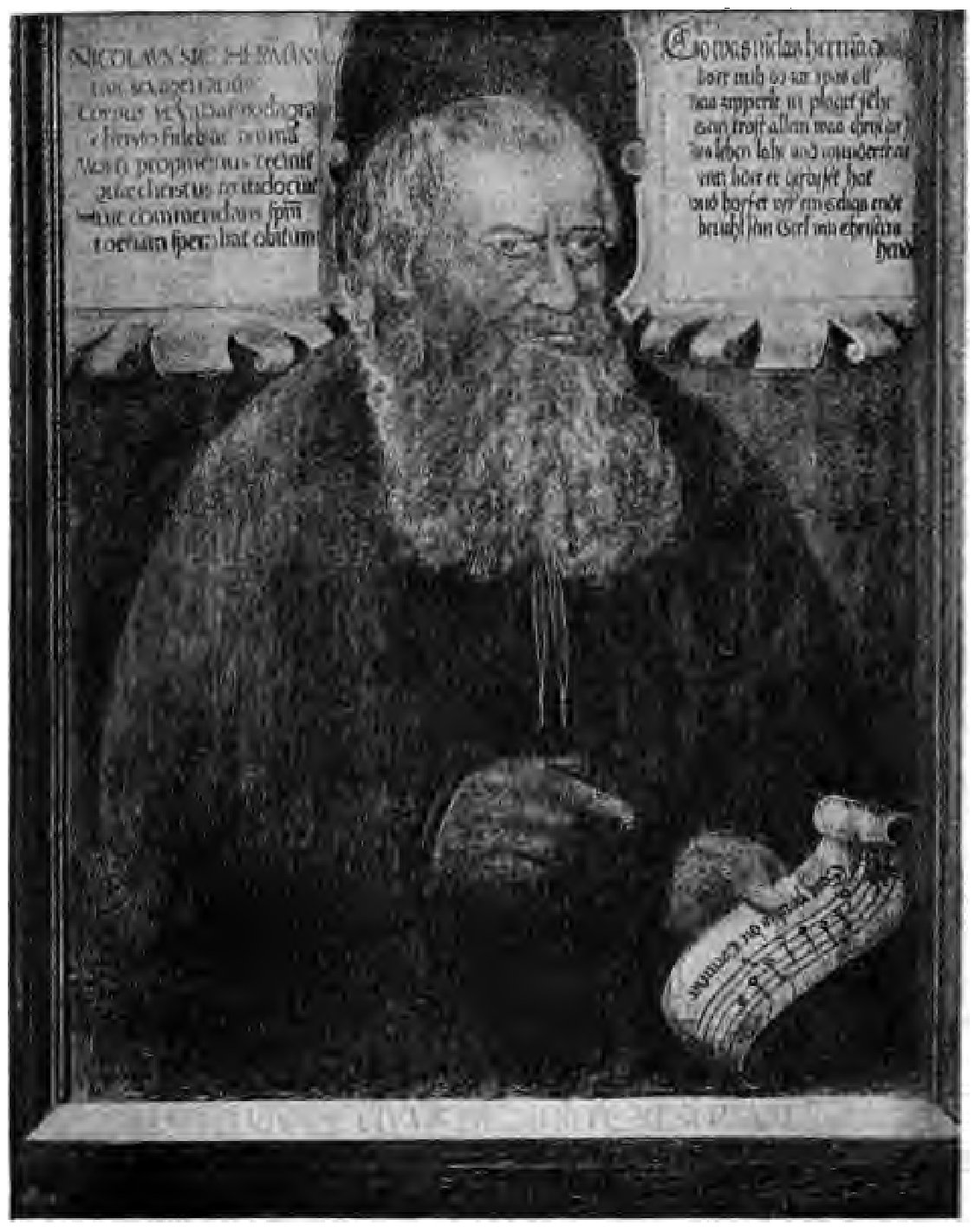
Die Sonntagsevangelia, title page of his 1560 publication

Nikolaus Herman (first name also Nicolaus or Niklas; c. 1500 – 3 May 1561) was a German Lutheran cantor and teacher, creating numerous Protestant hymns. Some of them are contained in hymnals in several languages.

== Career ==
Herman was born in Altdorf. In 1518 he came as cantor and teacher at the Latin School of Joachimsthal (now Jáchymov, Bohemia). He was a supporter of the Reformation; a letter of Martin Luther to him is dated 6 November 1524. He collaborated with people such as Johannes Mathesius, who served there from 1532 as principal of the school, and from 1540 as a pastor. On 24 June 1557 Herman retired. He published his hymns, which he wrote primarily for teaching children, in 1560 under the title Die Sonntagsevangelia über das Jahr in Gesänge verfasset für die Kinder und christlichen Hausväter (The Sundays' Gospels through the year in songs written for the children and Christian fathers).

== Hymns ==
Several of his hymns are part of present-day hymnals, such as the current German Protestant hymnal Evangelisches Gesangbuch (EG) and the Catholic hymnal Gotteslob (GL).

He created text and melody for a few hymns:

- "Lobt Gott, ihr Christen alle gleich" (also: "allzugleich") (Praise God, you Christians all the same) (EG 27, GL 134): The hymn text was published in 1560, with a melody Herman had already published in 1554 (then as tune of "Kommt her, ihr lieben Schwesterlein", Zahn No. 198).
- "Erschienen ist der herrlich Tag" (EG 106, GL 225)

He wrote the text of:

- "Da der Herr Christ zu Tische saß"
- "Heut sein die lieben Engelein" (part of EG 29)
- "Wir wollen singn ein’ Lobgesang" (EG 141)
- "Ein wahrer Glaube Gotts Zorn stillt" (EG 413)
- "Die helle Sonn leucht' jetzt herfür" (EG 437, GL 667)
- "Hinunter ist der Sonnen Schein" (EG 467)
- "In Gottes Namen fahren wir" (EG 498)
- "Wenn mein Stündlein vorhanden ist" (EG 522, stanzas 1–4, GL 658), a fifth stanza added by an anonymous writer, with a melody possibly by Herman, based on older melodies

Johann Sebastian Bach used stanzas from his hymns in several cantatas. In the cantata for Easter Sunday 1715, Der Himmel lacht! Die Erde jubilieret, BWV 31, Bach used the melody of "Wenn mein Stündlein vorhanden ist" instrumentally in movement 8, stanza 5 as the closing chorale, movement 9. Bach closed Christus, der ist mein Leben, BWV 95 (1723), with stanza 4 of the same hymn. The first stanza of "Erschienen ist der herrlich Tag" appears in the center of the cantata for the first Sunday after Easter Halt im Gedächtnis Jesum Christ, BWV 67 (1724), a stanza from "Lobt Gott, ihr Christen, allzugleich" in Süßer Trost, mein Jesus kömmt, BWV 151, for the third day of Christmas 1725, and the hymn's final stanza to close Ich lebe, mein Herze, zu deinem Ergötzen, BWV 145 for the third day of Easter (1729). In his Orgelbüchlein, he composed organ preludes on "Lobt Gott, ihr Christen, allzugleich" (BWV 609) and the Easter hymn "Erschienen ist der herrlich Tag" (BWV 629).

Several hymns were translated to Danish and English and included in hymnals, such as the Danish Psalmebog for Kirke og Hjem. "Lobt Gott, ihr Christen alle gleich" was translated to "Let all together praise our God" by A. T. Russell, as No. 52 in his Psalms & Hymns, 1851, and to "Praise ye the Lord, ye Christians" E. Cronenwett, as No. 31 in the Ohio Lutheran Hymnal, 1880, among others.

== Sources ==
- Friedrich Wilhelm Bautz (1990). "HERMAN, Nikolaus". In Bautz, Friedrich Wilhelm (ed.). Biographisch-Bibliographisches Kirchenlexikon (BBKL) (in German). Vol. 2. Hamm: Bautz. cols. 747–749. ISBN 3-88309-032-8.
- Adalbert Elschenbroich (1969). "Herman, Nikolaus". Neue Deutsche Biographie (in German). Vol. 8. Berlin: Duncker & Humblot. p. 628. (full text online).
- Philipp Wackernagel, Das deutsche Kirchenlied von der ältesten Zeit bis zu Anfang des 17.Jahrhunderts. 5 vol. 1855; all texts by Nikolaus Herman in vol. 2
