= Melchior Vulpius =

German singer and composer (c. 1570–1615)

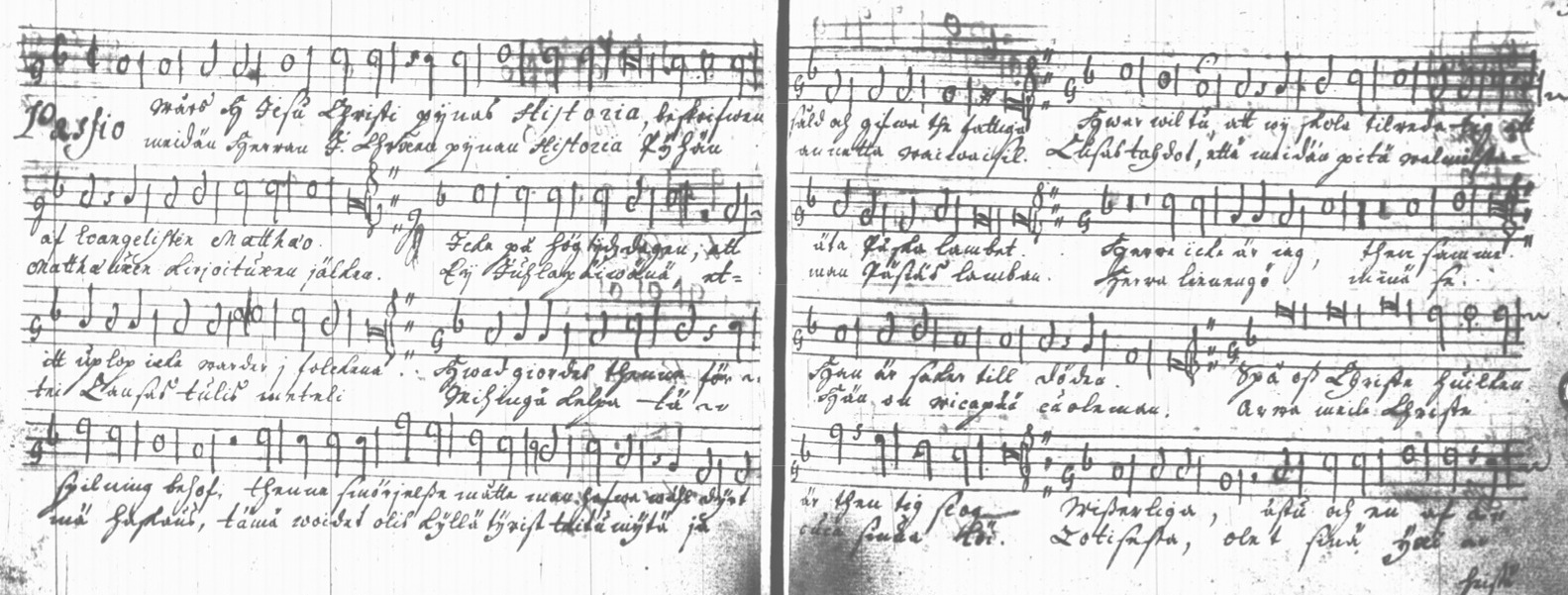
The beginning of Vulpius' St Matthew Passion in Porin Lyseo's trivial school's discantus part book (1725), text in Swedish and in Finnish

Melchior Vulpius (c. 1570 in Wasungen – 7 August 1615 in Weimar) was a German singer and composer of church music.

Vulpius came from a poor craftsman's family. He studied at the local school in Wasungen (in Thuringia) with Johann Steuerlein. From 1588, he attended the school in Speyer. After marrying in 1589, he obtained a position at the Gymnasium in Schleusingen. In 1596, he was named cantor in Weimar.

He wrote and published church music, the best known being the setting of the hymn "Ach bleib mit deiner Gnade" (Ah, stay with your grace) on a text by Josua Stegmann. This setting was often performed in Protestant churches on New Year's Day and at the end of the service. Important compilations were Cantiones sacrae (1602, 1604), Kirchengesänge und geistliche Lieder Dr. Luthers (1604), Canticum beatissimae (1605) and Ein schön geistlich Gesangbuch (1609). The Cantional (a collection of songs) was published posthumously in 1646 in Gotha.

The St. Matthew Passion is another of Vulpius' well-known works. By the middle of the 17th century, the music for the Passion had spread also to Sweden and later to Finland. Based on the several copies of music manuscripts that have been preserved in different archives in Finland, it can be concluded that the Passion became rather popular there. According to historical sources, this was the very first polyphonic passion composition ever performed in Finland. Later, the Passion fell into oblivion, but from 2007 onwards, the Finnish Vulpius Passion tradition has been revived by the early music ensemble Sonus Borealis, that has been performing it in several churches in Southeast Finland, and Kuninkaantien muusikot (Musicians of the King's Road), that has given multiple performances of the Passion in Southwest Finland, Central Finland and Ostrobothnia.

== Hymn tunes ==
- "Ach bleib mit deiner Gnade", also for "Beim letzten Abendmahle"
- "Die beste Zeit im Jahr ist mein", text by Martin Luther
- "Der Tag bricht an und zeiget sich"
- "Die helle Sonn leucht' jetzt herfür"
- "Christus, der ist mein Leben"
- "Gelobt sei Gott im höchsten Thron", text by Michael Weiße (tune name, "Gelobt sei Gott")
- "Hinunter ist der Sonne Schein"
- "Jesu, deine Passion"
- "Jesu Kreuz, Leiden und Pein" (1609), Zahn No. 6288b
- "Lobt Gott den Herrn ihr Heiden all"
- "Zieh an die Macht du Arm des Herrn"

== Works ==
- Pars prima Cantionum sacrarum (1602)
- Pars secunda selectissimarum Cantionum sacrarum (1603)
- Kirchen Geseng und Geistliche Lieder D. Martini Lutheri und anderer frommen Christen (1604)
- Erster Theil Deutscher Sonntäglicher Evangelien Sprüche (1612)
- Das Leiden und Sterben Unsers Herrn Erlösers Jesu Christi auß dem heiligen Evangelisten Matthäo (1613, new edition 1981)
- Der ander Theil Deutscher Sonntäglicher Ev. Sprüche (1614)
