= Ach bleib mit deiner Gnade =

Hymn with text by Josua Stegmann

- Christian hymn
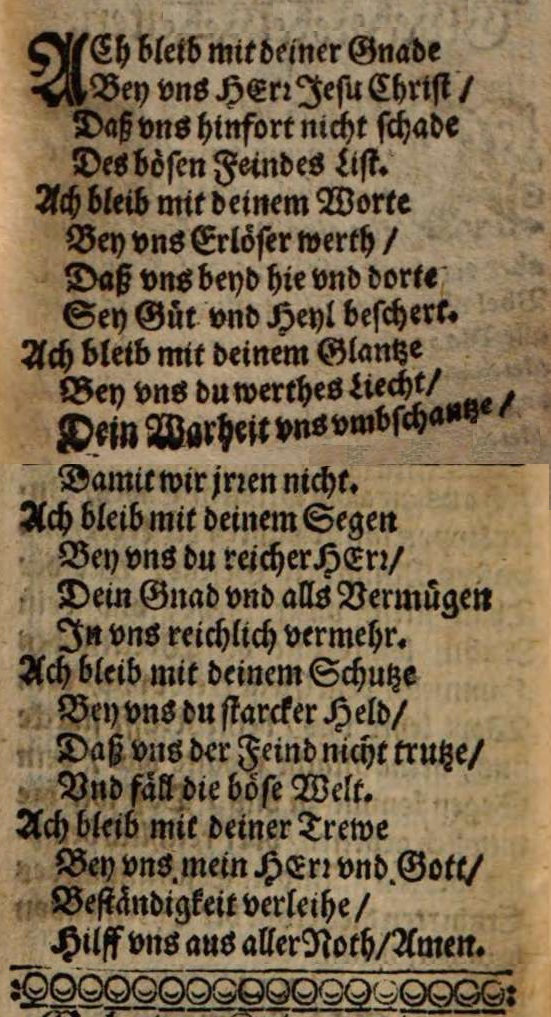
- "Ach bleib mit deiner Gnade", Lüneburg, 1633
- English: Ah, abide with your grace
- Written: 1627
- Text: by Josua Stegmann
- Language: German
- Melody: by Melchior Vulpius
- Composed: 1609

"Ach bleib mit deiner Gnade" (Ah, abide with your grace) is a hymn with text by Josua Stegmann written in 1627. The melody is taken from "Christus, der ist mein Leben", a 1609 song by Melchior Vulpius that became one of the key melodies in Protestant hymnody. It is part of several current hymnals, the Protestant Evangelisches Gesangbuch as EG 347, the Catholic Gotteslob as GL 436 and the Mennonitisches Gesangbuch as MG 149. It belongs to the ecumenical hymns.

== History ==
Stegmann was a Lutheran theologian at the University of Rinteln from 1621. During the Thirty Years' War, the town was occupied for half a year in 1623 by troupes of Christian von Braunschweig-Wolfenbüttel. From the mid-1625s, it was also stricken by the plague. Stegmann wrote "Ach bleib mit deiner Gnade" and published it in 1627 in the second edition of his prayer book Christliches Gebet Büchlein, subtitled "... auff die bevorstehende Betrübte, Krigs, Theurung und Sterbens Zeiten gerichtet, benebenst Morgen und Abendtsegen auff alle Tage in der Wochen, so wol auch Beicht, Communion und andern Gebetlein auff allerhand Noth der Christenheit accommodiret" (... for the upcoming sad times of war, inflation and dying, with blessings for morning and evening for all days of the week, as well as accommodating repentance, communion and other little prayers for several needs of Christianity). The first edition, probably of 1626, is lost. It appeared again in Lüneburg in the 1633 collection Ernewerte Hertzen-Seufftzer (Renewed heart's sighs).

== Theme ==
Each of the six stanzas begins with "Ach bleib ... bei uns" (Abide ... with us). It is reminiscent of a line from the narration of the walk to Emmaus: "Bleib bei uns, denn es will Abend werden", which was later set to music by Bach in his cantata Bleib bei uns, denn es will Abend werden, BWV 6, in Rheinberger's Abendlied, Albert Thate's round "Herr, bleibe bei uns" and Jacques Berthier's "Bleib mit deiner Gnade".

The six stanzas pray that Jesus may remain "with us" ("bei uns") with his grace, word, illumination, blessing, protection and faithfulness, possibly derived from 1 Corinthians 1:4–9.

== Melody and music ==
The melody was taken from a 1609 hymn, "Christus, der ist mein Leben", by Melchior Vulpius, which developed to a key melody of Protestant congregational singing.

More songs were written to the same melody, such as the 1850 "Nun schreib ins Buch des Lebens" (Now write into the book of life) in Strasbourg, and the Catholic "Beim letzten Abendmahle" (At the last supper"), written by Christoph von Schmid in 1807, and part of the Gotteslob as GL 282.

Heinrich Schütz composed a choral setting, SWV 445. Wilhelm Rudnick composed another, Op. 70,1, and Sigfrid Karg-Elert wrote an organ chorale, one of his 66 Chorale improvisations for organ, Op. 87,1.

The jazz musicians Till Brönner (flugelhorn) and Dieter Ilg (double bass) included the song in their 2018 album Nightfall.

== Translation ==
Catherine Winkworth translated the text into English in 1863 as "Abide among us with Thy grace". She changed the metre, making it impossible to sing it to the common melody in German-speaking areas, but it became popular with several different tunes.
