= Die helle Sonn leucht' jetzt herfür =

Lutheran hymn

- Morning hymn by Nikolaus Herman
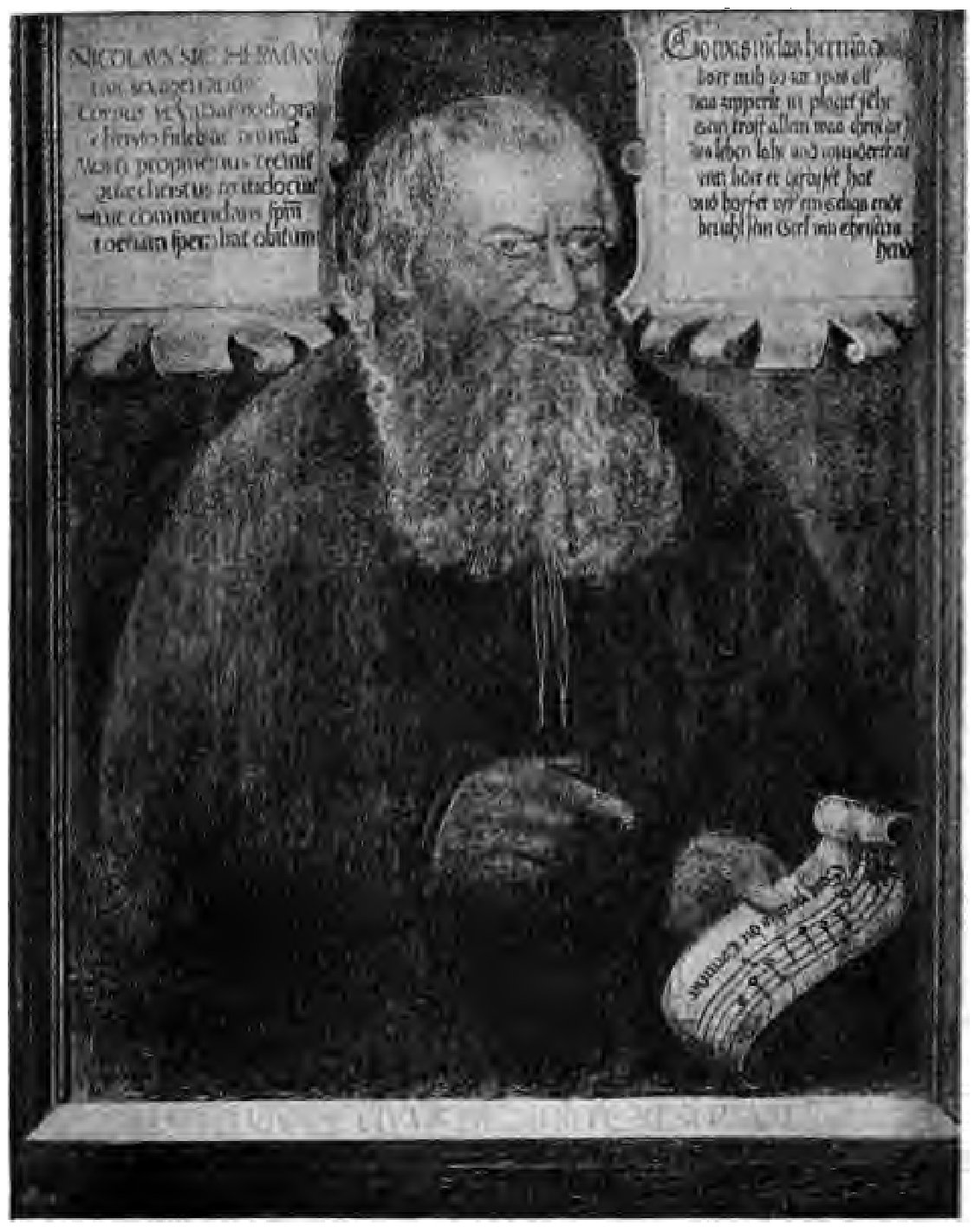
- Nikolaus Herman, in a 19th-century publication
- English: The bright sun shines now
- Written: 1560
- Text: by Nikolaus Herman
- Language: German
- Meter: 8.8.8.8
- Melody: by Melchior Vulpius

"Die helle Sonn leucht' jetzt herfür" (The bright sun shines now) is a Lutheran hymn with text written in 1560 by Nikolaus Herman. The melody of the morning hymn was composed by Melchior Vulpius in 1609. It is part of the modern Protestant Evangelisches Gesangbuch and of other hymnals and songbooks.

== History ==
Nikolaus Herman wrote the text of the morning hymn "Die helle Sonn leucht' jetzt herfür" in 1560. Melchior Vulpius composed the melody in 1609. The song is part of the modern Protestant hymnal in German, Evangelisches Gesangbuch, and of other hymnals and songbooks.

== Text and melody ==
"Die helle Sonn leucht' jetzt herfür" is in for stanzas of four long lines each, rhyming A–A–B–B. All lines have eight syllables. It is a morning song written in the first person plural. In the first stanza, the singers describe the morning light of the sun and awaking merrily, and then thank God for protection during the night. In the second stanza, they request protection for the day from Jesus and angels, continued in the third stanza by the wish to remain faithful and following God's will during the day without resistance, with Jesus as a model in everything begun. The last stanza is a plea that all work may turn out well because every effort is for the glory of God – soli Deo gloria.

In 1609 Melchior Vulpius composed a melody for the song that has been described as cheerful. Wilhelm Killmayer composed a four part setting published Schott.
