= Halt im Gedächtnis Jesum Christ, BWV 67 =

Church cantata by Johann Sebastian Bach

Halt im Gedächtnis Jesum Christ
- BWV 67
- Church cantata by J. S. Bach
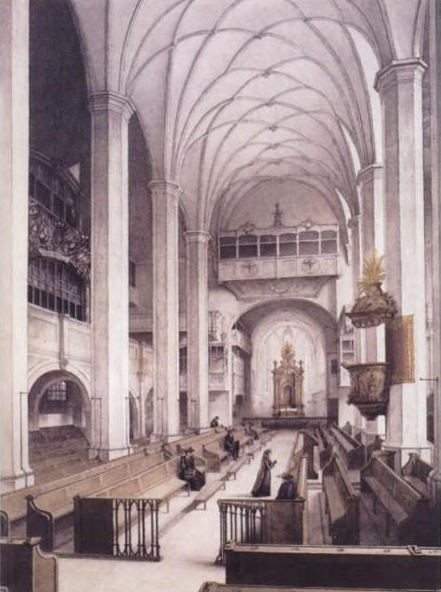
- Thomaskirche, Leipzig
- Occasion: Sunday after Easter
- Bible text: 2 Timothy 2:8
- Chorale: "Erschienen ist der herrlich Tag" by Nikolaus Herman; "Du Friedefürst, Herr Jesu Christ" by Jakob Ebert
- Performed: 16 April 1724: Leipzig
- Movements: 7
- Vocal: SATB choir; alto, tenor and bass solo
- Instrumental: corno da tirarsi; flauto traverso; 2 oboes d'amore; 2 violins; viola; continuo

Halt im Gedächtnis Jesum Christ (Keep Jesus Christ in mind), BWV 67, is a church cantata by Johann Sebastian Bach. He composed it in Leipzig for Quasimodogeniti, the first Sunday after Easter, and first performed it on 16 April 1724.

Based on the prescribed gospel of the appearance of Jesus to the Disciples, first without then with Thomas, an unknown poet compares the situation of the doubtful Thomas to the Christian in general. He places Nikolaus Herman's Easter hymn "Erschienen ist der herrlich Tag" in the centre of the cantata, repeats the line "Friede sei mit euch" (Peace be with you) several times, and ends with the first stanza from Jakob Ebert's hymn "Du Friedefürst, Herr Jesu Christ" (Thou Prince of Peace, Lord Jesus Christ). Bach structured the work in seven movements, arranged in symmetry around the central chorale, and scored it for three solo voices, a four-part choir and a Baroque instrumental ensemble of a slide horn for hymn tunes, flauto traverso, two oboes d'amore, strings and basso continuo. Besides the unusual central chorale, the cantata contains a dramatic scena with Jesus repeating "Peace be with you" against the enemies.

== History and words ==
Bach composed the cantata in his first year as Thomaskantor in Leipzig, shortly after he first performed his St John Passion, for the First Sunday after Easter, called Quasimodogeniti. The prescribed readings for that Sunday were from the First Epistle of John, "our faith is the victory" (1 John 5:4–10), and from the Gospel of John, the appearance of Jesus to the Disciples, first without then with Thomas, in Jerusalem (John 20:19–31). The unknown poet begins with a verse from the Second Epistle to Timothy, "Remember that Jesus Christ … was raised from the dead" (2 Timothy 2:8). The poet sees Thomas as similar to the doubtful Christian in general, whose heart is not at peace. The center of the cantata is the Easter hymn "Erschienen ist der herrlich Tag" (The glorious day has appeared) by Nikolaus Herman (1560), praising the day of the resurrection. In contrast, movement 5 recalls the danger by the enemies, until in movement 6 Jesus appears, as he did to his disciples in Jerusalem, finally bringing peace. The line "Friede sei mit euch" (Peace be with you) is repeated four times, framing three stanzas of a poem. The closing chorale is the first stanza of "Du Friedefürst, Herr Jesu Christo" (Thou Prince of Peace, Lord Jesus Christ) by Jakob Ebert (1601).

Bach led the first performance on 16 April 1724.

== Music ==
=== Structure and scoring ===
Bach structured the cantata in seven movements, arranged symmetrically around a central chorale. He scored the work for three vocal soloists (alto, tenor, bass), a four-part choir and a Baroque instrumental ensemble of corno da tirarsi (Ct, a slide horn that Bach scored for a short period), flauto traverso (Ft), two oboes d'amore (Oa), two violins (Vl), viola (Va), and basso continuo.

In the following table of the movements, the scoring follows the Neue Bach-Ausgabe. The keys and time signatures are taken from Alfred Dürr, using the symbol for common time (4/4). The continuo, playing throughout, is not shown.

Movements of Halt im Gedächtnis Jesum Christ
No.	Title	Text	Type	Vocal	Winds	Strings	Key	Time
1	Halt im Gedächtnis Jesum Christ	Timotheus 2:8	Chorus	SATB	Ct Ft 2Oa	2Vl Va	A major	common time
2	Mein Jesus ist erstanden	anon.	Aria	T	Oa	2Vl Va	E major	common time
3	Mein Jesu, heißest du des Todes Gift	anon.	Recitative	A				common time
4	Erschienen ist der herrlich Tag	Herman	Chorale	SATB	Ft 2Oa	2Vl Va		
5	Doch scheinet fast	anon	Recitative	A				common time
6	Friede sei mit euch	anon.	Aria e Coro	B SAT	Ft 2Oa	2Vl Va	A major	3/4
7	Du Friedefürst, Herr Jesu Christ	Ebert	Chorale	SATB	Ct Fl 2Oa	2Vl Va		common time

=== Movements ===
The opening chorus reflects the contrast of hope and resurrection versus simultaneous remembrance and doubt, which is present throughout the cantata. The chorus is structured in symmetry in seven sections, beginning with an instrumental sinfonia of all instruments, the horn introducing a theme representing remembrance in a melody which resembles the choral tune of "O Lamm Gottes, unschuldig" which Bach would later use as a cantus firmus in the opening movement of his St Matthew Passion. Bach thus alludes to the idea that Jesus suffered innocently for the "sins of the world" before he rose again. In the second section, this melody is sung by the sopranos, while the lower voices stress the word "Halt" (hold) by several homophonic chords. In the third section, the sopranos repeat the melody in a fugue, while the altos simultaneously sing a countersubject that rises in fast movement for more than an octave, illustrating the resurrection. The fourth section is a reprise of the sinfonia with the voices added, then a variation of sections 2 to 4 follows as 5 to 7.

The tenor aria Mein Jesus ist erstanden (My Jesus is arisen) is accompanied by an obbligato oboe d'amore. The theme is presented in the opening by the strings and later picked up by the voice, illustrating the word "auferstanden" by an upward run.

The Easter hymn "Erschienen ist der herrlich Tag" marks the center of the composition. In symmetry, it is framed by two alto recitatives, the second a reprise of the first.

The idea of a solo singer alternating with a chorus is extended in the following movement, the bass aria with chorus Friede sei mit euch (Peace be with you). A string introduction depicts in agitated forte passages in 4/4 time the attack of the enemies. John Eliot Gardiner describes it as "a dramatic scena in which the strings work up a storm to illustrate the raging of the soul's enemies". In sharp contrast the bass as the vox Christi (voice of Christ) sings the greeting of Jesus from verse 19 of the Gospel, "Peace be with you", three times, accompanied by woodwinds in dotted rhythm in 3/4 time, marked piano. Musicologist Julian Mincham describes the music as serene, a "gentle, rocking, almost cradle-like rhythm creating a perfect atmosphere of peaceful contemplation". The upper voices of the choir (without basses) answer to the music of the introduction, seeing Jesus as help in the battle ("hilft uns kämpfen und die Wut der Feinde dämpfen"). The greeting and answering is repeated two more times in two stanzas of the poem, reflecting the strengthening of the weary in spirit and body ("erquicket in uns Müden Geist und Leib zugleich"), and finally overcoming death ("durch den Tod hindurch zu dringen"). The following fourth appearance of "Peace be with you" is accompanied by both woodwinds and strings, and peace is finally achieved. Klaus Hofmann describes the movement as an "operatic scene" and continues "Bach resorts to unconventional means; he shows himself as a musical dramatist and, in the process, stresses the element of contrast: he comments upon the words of the faithful with agitated, tumultuous string figures, whilst Jesus' peace greeting sounds calmly and majestically, embedded in pastoral wind sonorities." Bach adapted this movement as the Gloria of his Missa in A major, BWV 234.

The closing chorale "Du Friedefürst, Herr Jesu Christ" is a four-part setting.

== Recordings ==
The table below is taken from the selection on the Bach Cantatas Website. Performing groups singing one voice per part (OVPP) and instrumental groups playing period instruments in historically informed performances are marked by green background.

Recordings of Halt im Gedächtnis Jesum Christ
Title	Conductor / Choir / Orchestra	Soloists	Label	Year	Choir type	Instr.
Historic Bach cantatas	Karl Straube Thomanerchor Gewandhausorchester	Dorothea Schröder; Hans Lißmann	Bach Archiv Leipzig	1931		
Bach: Cantatas No. 67 & 11, from cantata No. 147	Reginald Jacques The Cantata Singers The Jacques Orchestra	Kathleen Ferrier; William Herbert; William Parsons	Decca Ace of Clubs	1949		
Bach Made in Germany Vol. 1 – Cantatas IV	Günther Ramin Thomanerchor Gewandhausorchester	Gertrud Wagner; Gert Lutze; Johannes Oettel	Eterna	1954		
J. S. Bach: Cantatas BWV 67, 108 & 127	Karl Richter Münchener Bach-Chor Münchener Bach-Orchester	Lilian Benningsen; Peter Pears; Kieth Engen	Teldec	1958		
Les Grandes Cantates de J. S. Bach Vol. 7	Fritz Werner Heinrich-Schütz-Chor Heilbronn Pforzheim Chamber Orchestra	Marga Höffgen; Helmut Krebs; Franz Kelch	Erato	1960		
Ansermet conducts Bach Cantatas No. 130, No. 67, excerpts from No. 101	Ernest Ansermet Chœur Pro Arte de Lausanne L'Orchestre de la Suisse Romande	Helen Watts; Werner Krenn; Tom Krause	Decca	1968		
J. S. Bach: Das Kantatenwerk • Complete Cantatas • Les Cantates, Folge / Vol. 4	Gustav Leonhardt: Knabenchor Hannover; Collegium Vocale Gent; Leonhardt-Consort	Paul Esswood; Kurt Equiluz; Max van Egmond	Teldec	1976		Period
J. S. Bach: Complete Cantatas Vol. 7	Ton Koopman Amsterdam Baroque Orchestra & Choir	Elisabeth von Magnus; Gerd Türk; Klaus Mertens	Antoine Marchand	1997		Period
Lecture Concerts – New Recordings Cantatas	Helmuth Rilling Gächinger Kantorei Bach-Collegium Stuttgart	Ingeborg Danz; James Taylor; Michael Volle	Hänssler	1998		
Bach Edition Vol. 19 – Cantatas Vol. 10	Pieter Jan Leusink Holland Boys Choir Netherlands Bach Collegium	Ruth Holton; Sytse Buwalda; Knut Schoch; Bas Ramselaar	Brilliant Classics	2000		Period
Bach Cantatas Vol. 23: Arnstadt/Echternach / For the 1st Sunday after Easter (Quasimodogeniti)	John Eliot Gardiner Monteverdi Choir English Baroque Soloists	Daniel Taylor; Charles Daniels; Stephen Varcoe	Soli Deo Gloria	2000		Period
J. S. Bach: Cantatas Vol. 18 – Cantatas from Leipzig 1724 – BWV 66, 67, 134	Masaaki Suzuki Bach Collegium Japan	Robin Blaze: Makoto Sakurada; Peter Kooy	BIS	2001		Period
J. S. Bach: Cantatas for the Complete Liturgical Year Vol. 11	Sigiswald Kuijken La Petite Bande	Gerlinde Sämann; Petra Noskaiová; Christoph Genz; Jan van der Crabben	Accent	2008	OVPP	Period

== Sources ==
- Halt im Gedächtnis Jesum Christ, BWV 67: Scores at the International Music Score Library Project
- Halt im Gedächtnis Jesum Christ BWV 67; BC A 62 / Sacred cantata Bach Digital
- BWV 67 Halt im Gedächtnis Jesum Christ English translation, University of Vermont
- Luke Dahn: BWV 67.4, BWV 67.7 bach-chorales.com
