= Erschienen ist der herrlich Tag =

German Easter hymn

- German Easter hymn by Nikolaus Herman
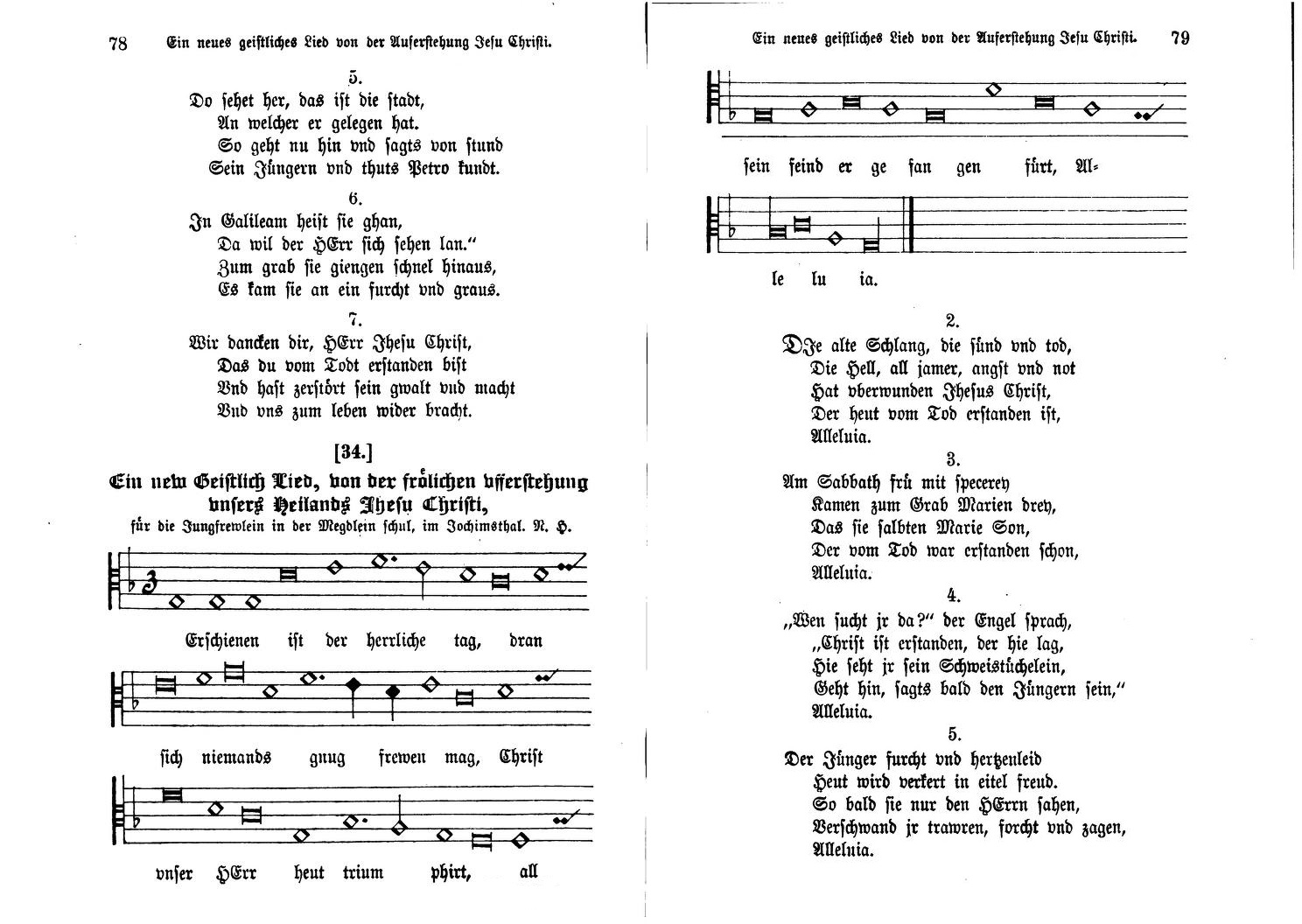
- Die Sonntags-Evangelia von Nicolaus Herman (1561), in a 19th-century publication
- English: Appeared is the splendid day
- Catalogue: Zahn 1743
- Language: German
- Published: 1561

"Erschienen ist der herrlich Tag" (Appeared is the splendid day) is a German Easter hymn, with text and tune (Zahn No. 1743) written by Nikolaus Herman and published in 1561. It has inspired musical settings by composers from the 17th to the 20th century. It appears in several hymnals, including the German Protestant hymnal Evangelisches Gesangbuch. Other hymns, especially Easter hymns, in both German and English, are sung to the same melody.

== History ==
"Erschienen ist der herrlich Tag" was written in 1560. Since then, it has been printed in German-language Protestant hymnals up to Evangelisches Gesangbuch. Listed as EG 106, it is shortened to five stanzas from the original 14. The hymn has appeared in 20 hymnals. It was part of Catholic hymnal Gotteslob of 1975, as GL 225, but only in regional sections of the 2013 version, such as GL 786 in Fulda.

== Text and theme ==
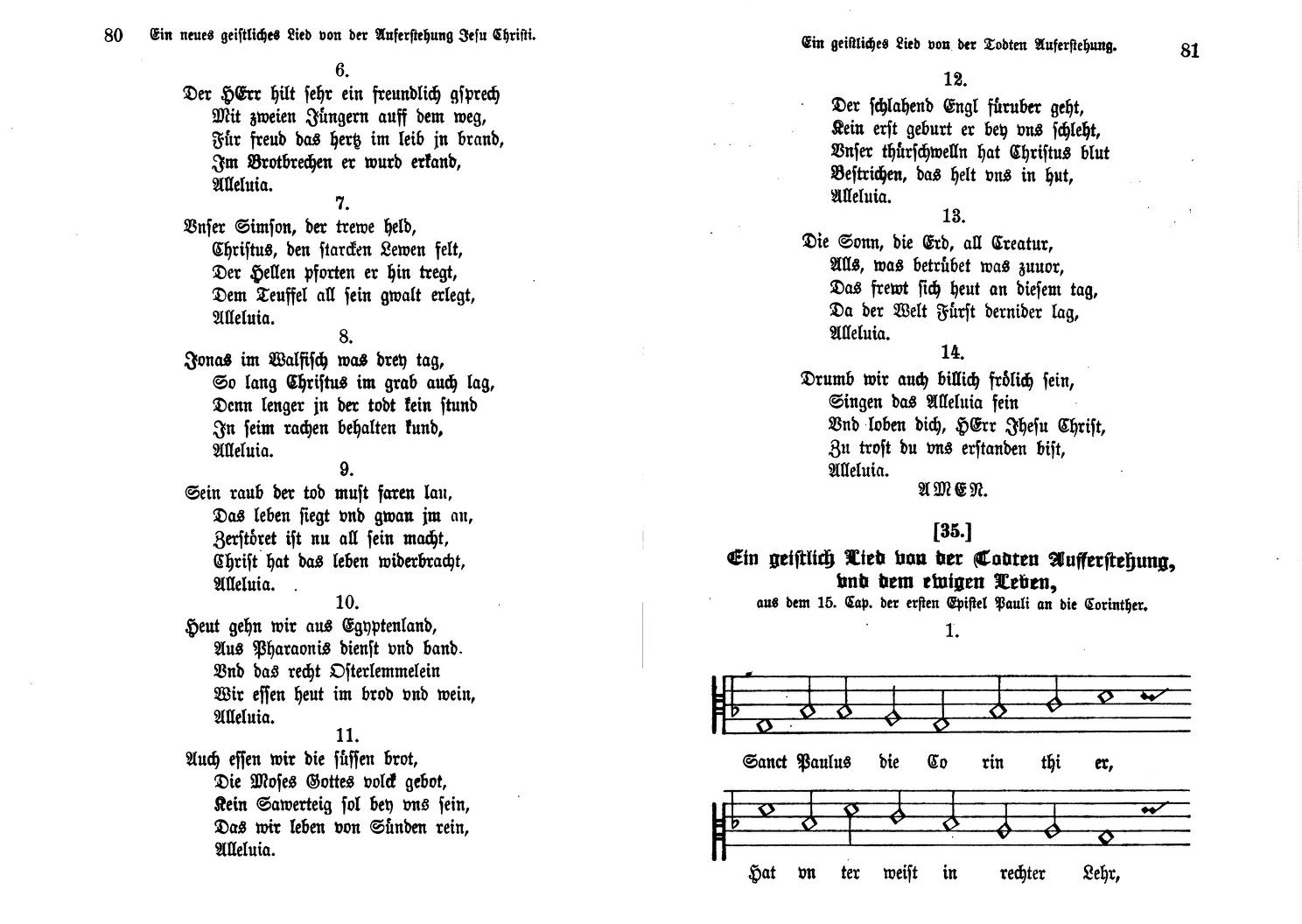
Second part of the 19th-century publication

Herman's hymn is in 14 stanzas, each has four lines of equal length, and is closed by an additional "Halleluja!".

The first stanza reads, with a translation by Pamela Dellal:

Erschienen ist der herrlich Tag,
Dran sich niemand gnug freuen mag:
Christ, unser Herr, heut triumphiert,
All sein Feind er gefangen führt.
Alleluja!

Translation:

The glorious day has appeared,
over which no one can rejoice enough:
Christ, our Lord, triumphs today,
He leads all His enemies captive.
Alleluia!

In the middle stanzas, events around Easter are narrated, such as the women at the grave, and appearances to the disciples, but also earlier related stories such as of Samson who smashed his prison, and of Jonah who was inside the great fish for three days. Further narrating stanzas see a parallel between the exodus and the resurrection. The song then turns to a comparison of spring, as revived creation, and the resurrection, and the resulting joy of all creatures.

In the version in the Protestant hymnal, the narrating stanzas are eliminated, to focus on the theological thoughts.

== Melody and musical settings ==
The melody in the first publication appears with the Easter song "Am Sabbat früh Marien drei" (Early on Sabbath three Marys. The author notes: "Uff diese Melodey mag man alle Euangelia singen / bis uff Pfingsten", indicating that it was suitable to all hymns for the Österliche Freudenzeit (Joyful Easter time) including the hymn for Ascension "Als viertzig tag nach Ostern warn". The melody is in Dorian mode, a triple metre, and shows dotted rhythms. Its character is dance-like. Musicologists have suggested an origin in Gregorian chant, and Easter plays that may have contained "liturgical dance".

An 1845 choral hymnal of four-part settings from the 16th and 17th centuries, Vierstimmige Choralsätze der vornehmsten Meister des XVI. und XVII. Jahrhunderts, lists three settings of the hymn, one by Johann Crüger, one by Gotthard Erythraeus, and one by Johann Hermann Schein. Bach used the first stanza in the center of his cantata for the first Sunday after Easter Halt im Gedächtnis Jesum Christ, BWV 67, in 1724. In his Orgelbüchlein, he composed a chorale prelude on the hymn (BWV 629) in which he uses the melody as a cantus firmus in soprano and bass in canon, with joyful motifs in the middle voices.

Max Reger composed a chorale prelude as part of his 52 chorale preludes, Op. 67 of 1902/03. Sigfrid Karg-Elert wrote a chorale improvisations on the hymn for organ, as part of his 66 Chorale improvisations, Op, 65 between 1906 and 1908. Hugo Distler wrote a setting for three high voices (SSA) as part of his collection Der Jahrkreis, Op. 5 in 1932/33. Ernst Pepping composed a chorale prelude as part of his Großes Orgelbuch, published in 1939. Settings from the 20th century also include Gustav Gunsenheimer's Vokalise über "Erschienen ist der herrlich Tag" for a low voice and organ, and a Sonata über "Erschienen ist der herrlich Tag" for clarinhorn (or flugelhorn or trumpet in B) and string orchestra by Widmar Hader, published in 1980.

Another Easter hymn is sung to the same melody, "Wir danken dir, Herr Jesu Christ, dass du vom Tod erstanden bist", listed as EG 107. It combines a stanza by Herman, originally the ending of "Am Sabbat früh Marien drei", with two stanzas by Thomas Hartmann, published in 1673. The hymn "Gott Lob, der Sonntag kommt herbei", a praise of the Sunday by Johann Olearius, printed in 1671 in his hymnal Geistliche Singe-Kunst (Spiritual art of singing), is also sung to the same melody.

English hymns sung to the tune include "We Sing, Immanuel, Thy Praise", "We Thank Thee, Jesus, Dearest Friend", and "Come, See The Place Where Jesus Lay".
