= Die beste Zeit im Jahr ist mein =

1538 hymn by Martin Luther

- Hymn by Martin Luther
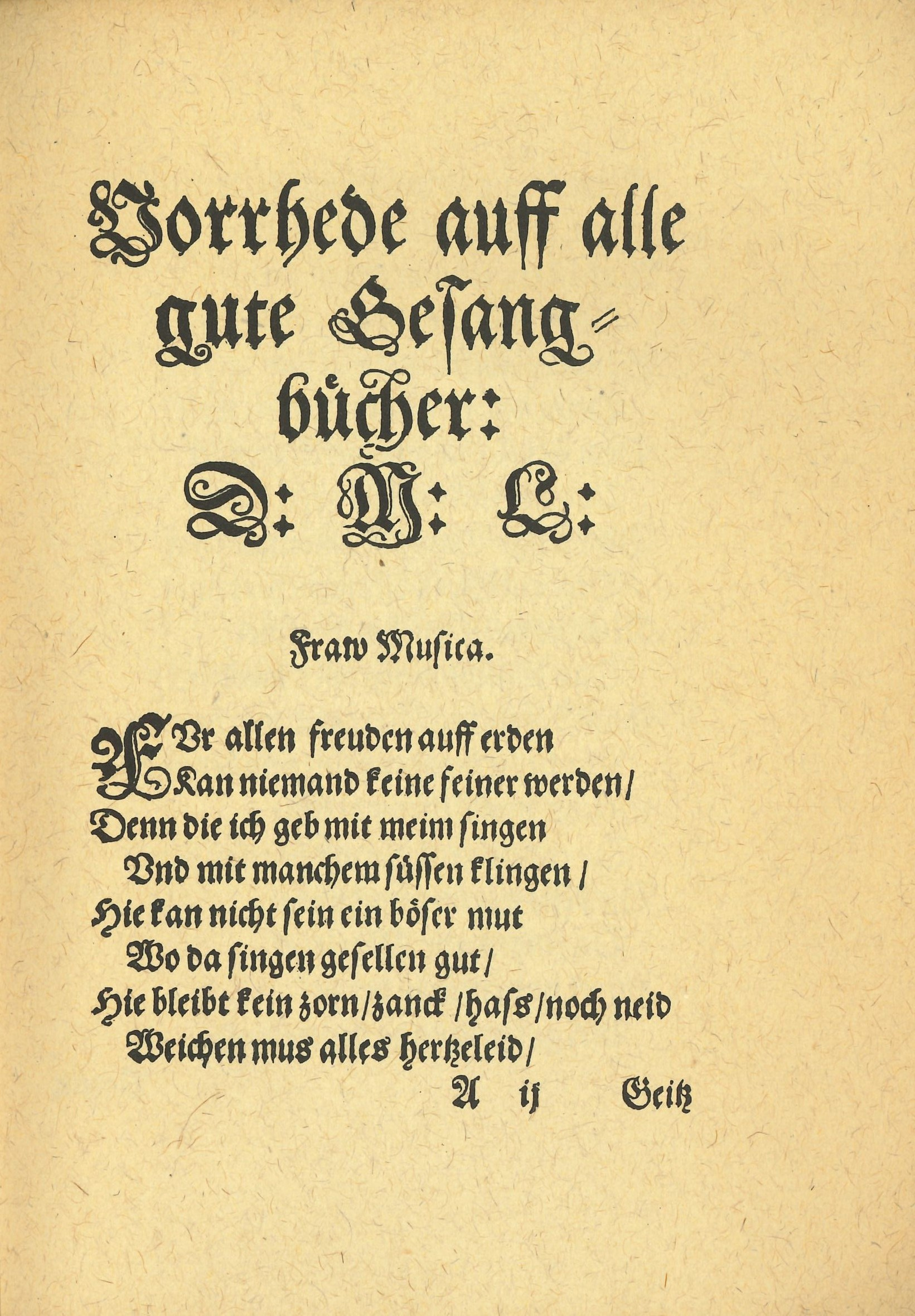
- First page of Lob vnd preis der loblichen Kunst Musica, the beginning of Luther's preface which contains the lyrics
- English: The best time of the year is mine
- Text: by Martin Luther
- Language: German
- Published: 1538

"Die beste Zeit im Jahr ist mein" (The best time of the year is mine) is a hymn by the Protestant reformer Martin Luther. He wrote it not as a hymn but as part of a longer poem which appeared first in 1538. In the current Protestant German hymnal Evangelisches Gesangbuch, it is EG 319.

== History ==
The reformer Martin Luther wrote the text as part of a longer poem of praise, not intended to be sung. The topic is firstly praise of music, especially singing, which turns to praise of God. The long poem appeared as a preface of a 1538 publication by Johann Walter, Lob vnd preis der loblichen Kunst Musica, praising the art of music. Luther's preface was titled Vorrede auf alle guten Gesangbücher (Foreword on all good hymnals), subtitled Lob der Frau Musica (The praise of Lady Music), with Music speaking. Luther's poem appears also in Joseph Klug's Wittenberger Gesangbuch of 1543.

The poem is in 40 lines, rhymed in pairs without structure in stanzas, which was a typical way of narration at the time. The lines 25 to 40 were taken as four stanzas. In the first stanza, Frau Musica introduces herself. The personification of the seven liberal arts as female figures was a medieval practice which Luther "translated" to German. Songbirds are mentioned, possibly representing a peaceful natural life. Luther said in a sermon about the Sermon on the Mount which also mentions birds: "Thut doch wie das vogelein, singt, seid frohlich und lasst die Sorge, lernet glauben." (Do as the bird, sing, be joyful and let go of sorrow, learn to believe). The second stanza mentions the nightingale. The other two stanzas develop from the praise of music the praise of God as the Creator.

== Text ==
The four stanzas used today:

Die beste Zeit im Jahr ist mein,
da singen alle Vögelein.
Himmel und Erden ist der voll,
viel gut Gesang da lautet wohl.

Voran die liebe Nachtigall
macht alles fröhlich überall
mit ihrem lieblichen Gesang,
des muß sie haben immer Dank.

Viel mehr der liebe Herre Gott,
der sie also geschaffen hat,
zu sein ein rechte Sängerin,
der Musica ein Meisterin.

Dem singt und springt sie Tag und Nacht,
seins Lobes sie nicht müde macht:
den ehrt und lobt auch mein Gesang
und sagt ihm einen ewgen Dank.

The best time of the year is mine,
when all the birds sing.
Heaven and earth is full
of much good sounding song.

Above all the dear nightingale
makes everything cheerful everywhere
with its lovely song,
for that it must be thanked.

Much more the dear Lord God
who created it like that,
to be a pleasing singer,
a master of music.

To Him it sings and hops day and night,
never tiring of His praise:
Him honours and praises my song, too,
and says eternal thanks.

== Melodies and settings ==
The four stanzas were assigned a melody of the Bohemian Brethren, adapted to a more modern form by Karl Lütge in 1917, commemorating 400 years after the Reformation. With this melody, the song was used more as a folk song than a hymn, but appeared in some regional appendices of the Protestant hymnal Evangelisches Kirchengesangbuch (EKG). The text was also sung to a melody and setting by Melchior Vulpius. Arnold Mendelssohn created a melody in triple time and composed a four-part setting. In the current Protestant German hymnal Evangelisches Gesangbuch, the song with the Lütge tune is EG 319. Volker Wangenheim set the melody for four parts.

== 2017 ==
In 2017, remembering 500 years of the Reformation, the song was the title of a night of broadcasting by the Deutschlandfunk, focused on Luther's hymns and music derived of them. "Die beste Zeit im Jahr ist mein" was heard in settings by Ernst Pepping and Arnold Mendelssohn.

== Bibliography ==
- Block, Johannes; Rößler, Martin (2007). "EG 319. Die beste Zeit im Jahr ist mein". Liederkunde zum Evangelischen Gesangbuch (in German). Vandenhoeck & Ruprecht. pp. 89–96. ISBN 9783525503379.
- Herbst, Wolfgang (2001). "Böhmische Brüder". Wer ist wer im Gesangbuch (in German). Vandenhoeck & Ruprecht. p. 46. ISBN 9783525503232.
- "Volker Wangenheim / Die beste Zeit im Jahr ist mein". Carus-Verlag. 2006.
- "Lange Nacht zum evangelischen Kirchenlied des 16. und 17. Jahrhunderts – Die beste Zeit im Jahr ist mein" (in German). Deutschlandfunk. 8 April 2017.
- "Informationen und Material zum Monatslied für Juli 2012 / EG 319 'Die beste Zeit im Jahr ist mein'" (PDF) (in German). Evangelisches Dekanat Hochtaunus. 2012.
