= Oxford Harmonic Choir =

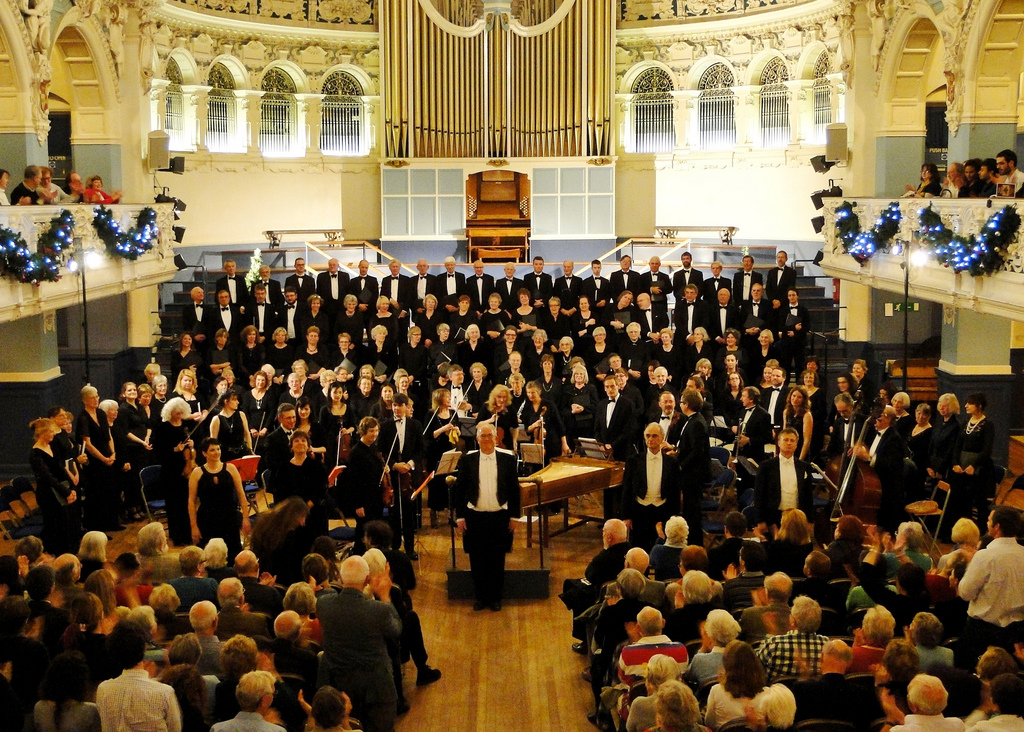
The choir's 90th Anniversary concert, November 2011, in Oxford Town Hall

Oxford Harmonic Choir is a large, mixed-voice amateur choir based in Oxford, England. It is the second-oldest non-collegiate choir in Oxford, having been founded in 1921, and according to The New Grove Dictionary of Music and Musicians is one of the "institutions of lasting significance to Oxford's musical life that were established during this period". Currently the choir has around 150 singing members and usually performs three concerts annually in either the Sheldonian Theatre or Oxford Town Hall with the Orchestra of Stowe Opera.

== History ==
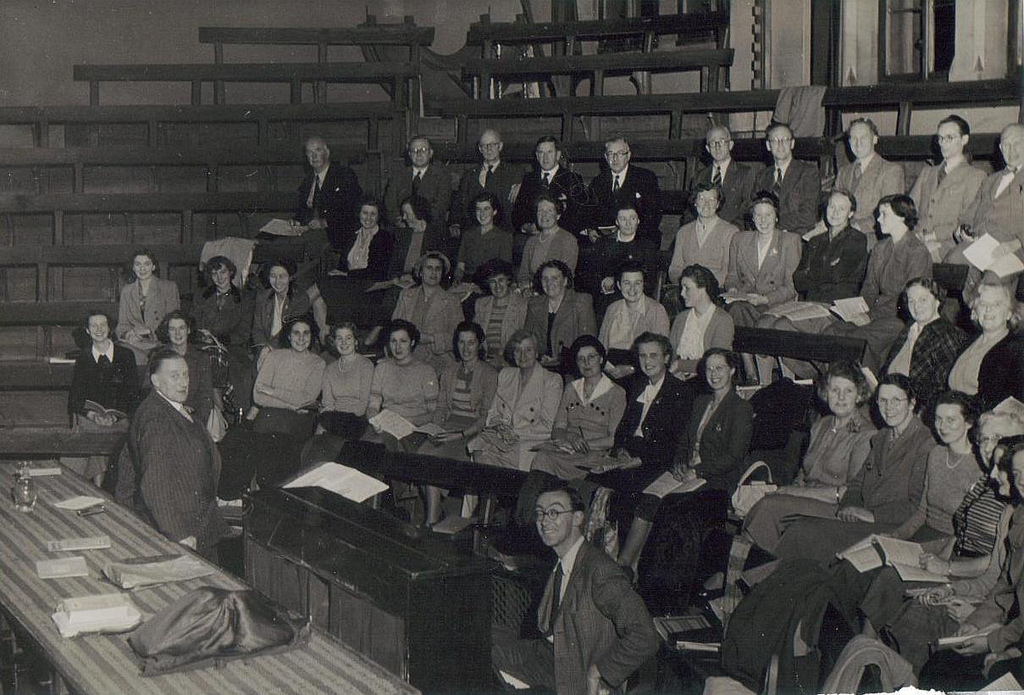
1950 choir rehearsal with George Thewlis conducting and Basil Thewlis at the piano

Originally the choir was known as the Iffley Glee Club, and after renaming itself the Iffley Choral Society in 1923, it became Oxford Harmonic Society in 1924 after moving base to central Oxford. In August 2014 the choir changed its name to Oxford Harmonic Choir.

A notable element of Oxford Harmonic Choir's performing history has been participation in various music festivals held in Oxford. These included a performance of Haydn's Creation in 1932 as part of a three-day Haydn festival which was described in The New York Times as "by far the most genial as well as the most admirable commemoration Great Britain has had of one whose popularity in the eighteenth century rivalled that of Handel himself".

Other festivals involving performances by the choir included the 1948 Oxford Festival of British Music and the 1950 Oxford Festival of Johann Sebastian Bach and the 1951 Oxford Festival of Arts linked to the Festival of Britain.

Another long-established and oft-noted tradition of the choir is the programming of rarely performed works in addition to the standard choral repertoire. Examples of this include:

- Thomas Arne's oratorio Judith on 19 February 1950 – quite possibly the last performance of this work in the UK and one of only a handful post 1800.
- Max Bruch's Das Feuerkreuz on 29 March 2003 – one of several lesser-known choral works by Bruch performed by the choir in recent years.
- Carl Loewe's Passion Oratorio on 31 March 2012 – the UK premiere of this work originally composed in 1847.

Since 1985, the choir has also taken part in a number of joint performances with the Bonn Philharmonic Choir in both Bonn and Oxford as part of activities celebrating the links between these twinned cities. One of the highlights of this partnership was a performance of Elgar's Dream of Gerontius in Bonn on 22 September 1991, also involving the Cologne Philharmonic. In addition to a highly enthusiastic response from the audience and reviewers from the Bonn press, the concert also gained considerable attention from The Elgar Society.

== Notable conductors ==
From 1923 to 1930 the choir's conductor was Reginald Jacques, who subsequently went on to conduct The Bach Choir in London for many years. Other conductors of note included Sir John Dykes Bower (1931–33) Sydney Watson (1933–39), George Thewlis (1941–61), Sir David Lumsden (1961–63), Richard Silk (1963–71), Peter Ward Jones (1971–80), Philip Cave (1980–89) and Professor Brian Trowell (1989–90). Robert Secret has been the choir's conductor since 1990.

== Notable soloists and orchestras ==
Over the years a significant number of well-known and well-loved professional soloists have taken part in the choir's concerts. The following are a selection:

- Soprano – Isobel Baillie, Susan Bullock, Lynne Dawson, Heather Harper, Margaret Ritchie, Dorothy Silk.
- Contralto – Muriel Brunskill, Jean Rigby, Monica Sinclair, Helen Watts.
- Countertenor – James Bowman, Paul Esswood.
- Tenor – John Mark Ainsley, John Elwes, Gerald English, Philip Langridge, Peter Pears, Steuart Wilson, Alexander Young.
- Bass & Baritone – John Carol Case, Thomas Hemsley, Roy Henderson, Henry Herford, Brian Kay, Dennis Noble, John Noble, Stephen Varcoe.

Although concerts have usually involved local orchestras (sometimes amateur and sometimes professional), on occasion the choir has employed well-known household names. The most notable of these include the New Queen's Hall Orchestra under Sir Henry Wood in 1927, two concerts with the London Symphony Orchestra in 1944 and 1949, and The King's Consort in 1989. In addition, the choir was also invited on several occasions to participate in performances promoted by Oxford Subscription Concerts (an organisation that put on numerous concerts in Oxford for several decades from 1920 onwards). These Subscription Concerts included the choir performing alongside the London Symphony Orchestra under Sir Hugh Allen in 1929 and the London Philharmonic Orchestra under Sir Malcolm Sargent in 1935.
