= Reginald Jacques =

English choral and orchestral conductor

Thomas Reginald Jacques
- Born: 13 January 1894
- Origin: England
- Died: 2 June 1969 (aged 75)
- Occupations: Choral and Orchestral conductor

Thomas Reginald Jacques (13 January 1894 – 2 June 1969) was an English choral and orchestral conductor. His legacy includes various choral music arrangements, but he is not primarily remembered as a composer.

Jacques was born in Ashby-de-la-Zouch, Leicestershire and obtained his first degree from the University of Oxford under Sir Hugh Allen, where he later became organist (1926) and fellow (1933) of Queen's College. Dr Jacques occupied a succession of increasingly prestigious and influential posts in the music world, based mostly in Oxford and London. He conducted the Oxford Harmonic Society between 1923 and 1930 and the Bach Choir from 1932 to 1960. He founded the Jacques String Orchestra in 1936. He became music director of the Council for the Encouragement of Music and the Arts (CEMA) at its inception in January 1940.

Kathleen Ferrier was frequently a soloist under Jacques during that time, and performed her first London Messiah with him on 17 May 1943, an event which opened up her career. His string orchestra established the morning concert series at the first Edinburgh International Festival in 1947, and (beyond its core repertoire of Baroque music) also performed and premiered contemporary English works by composers such as Arthur Bliss, Arnold Cooke, Gordon Jacob and John Ireland. His string arrangement of Peter Warlock's Adam Lay Ybounden has recently been recorded.

He collaborated with Sir David Willcocks in compiling the popular first volume of Carols for Choirs (1961), which incorporates several of his better known arrangements. He was the first director of CEMA, the Council for the Encouragement of Music and the Arts, forerunner of the Arts Council. Jacques suffered from ill health most of his life, a consequence of wounds received in World War One. He retired from conducting in 1960. His address in the 1950s and 1960s was 12, St Mary Abbot's Place, Kensington. He was a guest on Desert Island Discs on 26 August 1963.

== Bibliography ==
- Arthur Jacobs: 'Jacques, Reginald', Grove Music Online ed. L. Macy (accessed 10 March 2021) (subscription required)
