= Jauchzet dem Herrn, alle Welt =

Jauchzet dem Herrn, alle Welt may refer to:

- the opening words in German of Psalm 100 ('O be joyful in the Lord, all ye lands')
- Jauchzet dem Herren, alle Welt, SWV 36, a setting of Psalm 100 in German for double choir by Heinrich Schütz, published in 1619
- Jauchzet dem Herrn alle Welt (motet), a pasticcio with parts by Telemann and Bach
- Jauchzet dem Herrn, alle Welt (Mendelssohn), an anthem for eight voices
- Jauchzet dem Herren, alle Welt (Reger), the beginning of the choral symphony Der 100. Psalm
