= Nun jauchzt dem Herren, alle Welt =

1646 hymn by David Denicke, based on psalm 100

- German Christian hymn
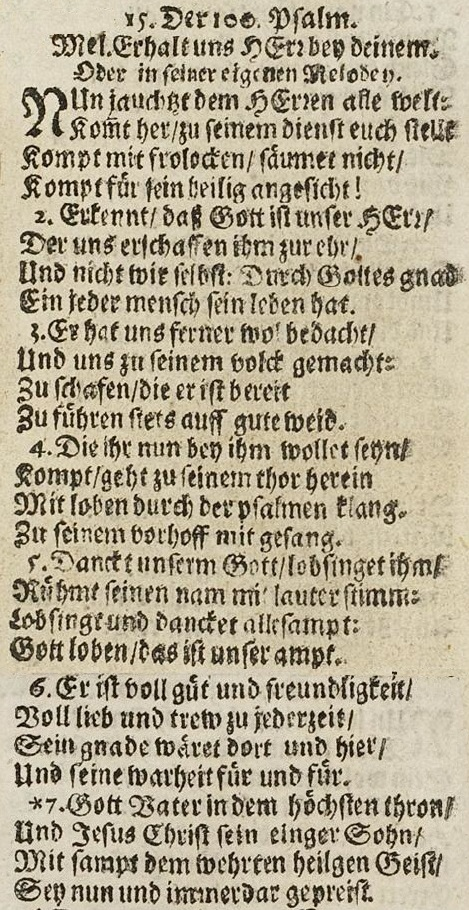
- The song in the 1672 Hannoversches Gesangbuch
- English: Now rejoice to the Lord, all world
- Text: by David Denicke
- Based on: Psalm 100
- Composed: 14th century
- Published: 1646

"Nun jauchzt dem Herren, alle Welt" (Now rejoice to the Lord, all the world) is a German Christian hymn, a paraphrase of Psalm 100. The text was written by David Denicke, based on a metered paraphrase of the psalm from the Becker Psalter, and published in his 1646 hymnal. The song appears in modern German-language hymnals, such as the Protestant Evangelisches Gesangbuch and the Catholic Gotteslob. With a joyful melody derived from a 14th-century model, it is one of the most popular psalm songs in German.

== History ==
=== David Denicke ===
David Denicke, who had studied law and travelled in Europe, worked from 1629 for George, Duke of Brunswick-Calenberg, as a tutor of his two eldest sons. From 1639, he was abbot of the Stift Bursfelde. In 1640 he settled in Hannover where he resumed working for George, who had moved his residence and built the Leineschloss. Denicke first worked as a Hofrat (court councillor), then from 1942 as Konsistorialrat (church councillor). He married in 1643.

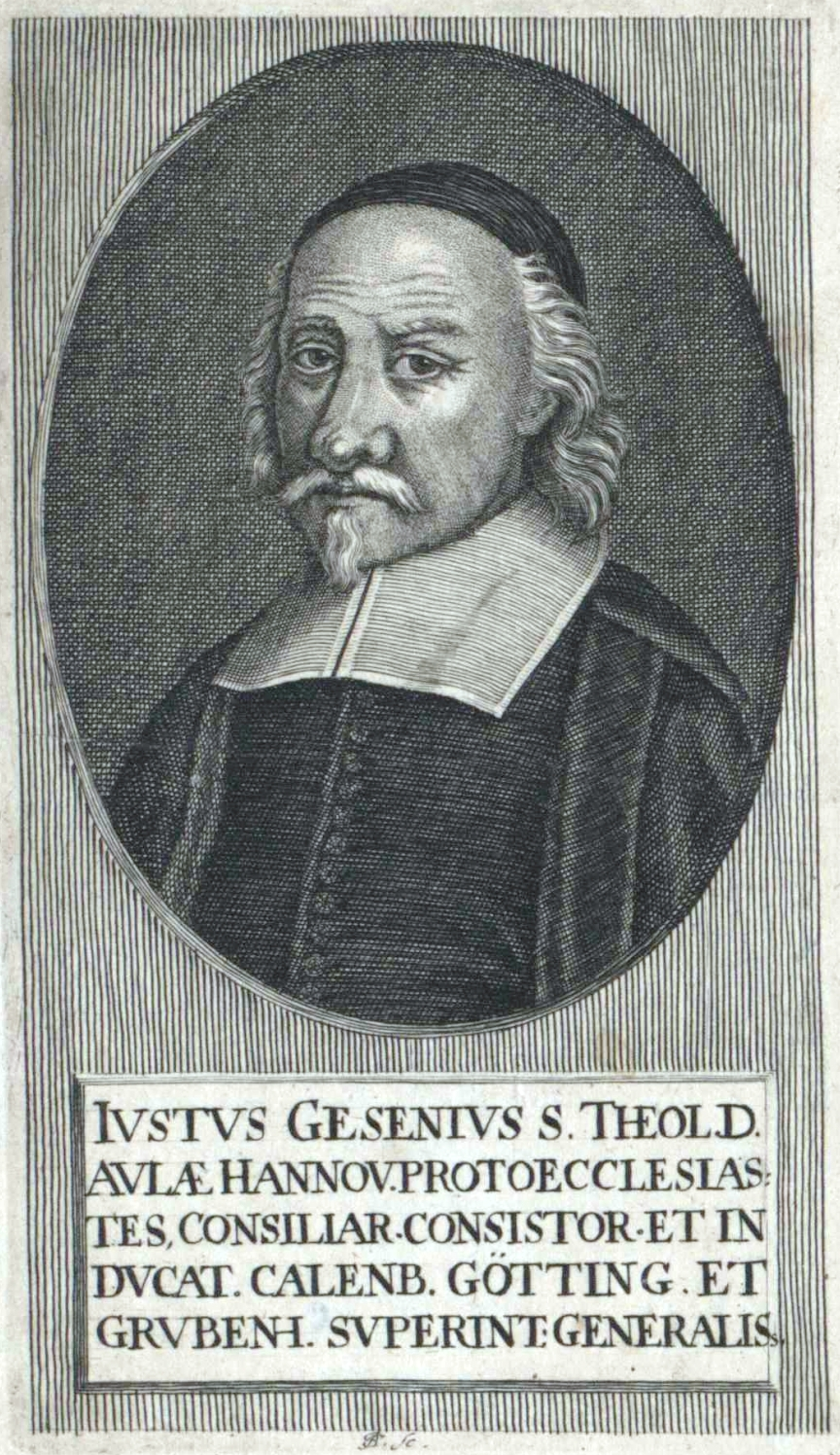
Justus Gesenius

Denicke collaborated with Justus Gesenius, a Hofprediger (court preacher), to publish a hymnal in 1646 which was mostly intended for private use. It was entitled New Ordentlich Gesang-Buch, Sampt Einer nothwendigen Vorrede u. Erinnerung Von dessen nützlichem Gebrauch (New orderly song-book, with a necessary preface and reminder of its fruitful use). It was meant to "encourage private devotion". It was a forerunner to the Hannoversches Gesangbuch for public use, which first appeared in Lüneburg in 1657.

=== Psalm 100, the hymn and publication ===
Denicke wrote the text as a paraphrase of Psalm 100 (known as Jubilate), which calls on the believer to serve God with gladness in joyful sound. The psalm begins in English "Make a joyful noise unto the Lord", according to the Book of Common Prayer. Denicke rephrased a work by Cornelius Becker, "Jauchzet dem Herren alle Welt" from the Becker Psalter of 1602, to polish its language according to the poetry standards of Martin Opitz. Instead of the four stanzas in the Becker psalter, he wrote six stanzas following the psalm. He elaborated the thought of God as a Good Shepherd, as expressed in Psalm 23, and the duty of the believer to praise God. The song became part of the 1646 hymnal. A seventh stanza was added as a doxology (Gloria Patri) in the 1648 edition, which was exchanged for another doxology in the 1653 Lüneburg edition of the hymnal.

=== Modern publication ===
The hymn appears, with slightly modernised text, in the modern German-language hymnals for both Protestants and Catholics, in the Evangelisches Gesangbuch of 1993 as EG 288, and in the Gotteslob of 2013 as GL 144. The Catholic version uses a different doxology stanza. The psalm song is also part of Swiss hymnals, and of many songbooks, including collections for families, children and young adults.

=== Translation ===
While several sources claim that the hymn is known in English as "All People that on Earth do Dwell", that 1650 hymn by William Kethe is rather a translation from the Genevan Psalter, sung to the melody Old 100th.

== German text and Psalm 100 ==
The text in the 2013 Gotteslob, slightly revised compared to the original, is given juxtaposed with the Psalm 100 verses in the King James Version, with the final stanza being a metric paraphrase of the Gloria Patri:

In German
Corresponding psalm verse

Nun jauchzt dem Herren, alle Welt.
Kommt her, zu seinem Dienst euch stellt,
kommt mit Frohlocken, säumet nicht,
kommt vor sein heilig Angesicht.

Make a joyful noise unto the Lord, all ye lands.
Serve the Lord with gladness:

come before his presence with singing.

Erkennt, dass Gott ist unser Herr,
der uns erschaffen ihm zur Ehr,
und nicht wir selbst; durch Gottes Gnad
ein jeder Mensch sein Leben hat.

Know ye that the Lord he is God:
it is he that hath made us,
and not we ourselves:

Wie reich hat uns der Herr bedacht,
der uns zu seinem Volk gemacht,
Als guter Hirt ist er bereit
zu führen uns auf seine Weid.

We are his people,

and the sheep of his pasture.

Die ihr nun wollet bei ihm sein,
kommt, geht zu seinen Toren ein,
mit Loben durch der Psalmen Klang,
zu seinem Hause mit Gesang.

Enter into his gates with thanksgiving,

and into his courts with praise:

Dankt unserm Gott, lobsinget ihm,
rühmt seinen Namen mit lauter Stimm,
lobsingt und danket allesammt;
Gott loben, das ist unser Amt.

be thankful unto him,

and bless his name.

Er ist voll Güt und Freundlichkeit,
voll Treu und Lieb zu jeder Zeit,
sein Gnad währt immer dort und hier
und seine Wahrheit für und für.

For the Lord is good,

his mercy is everlasting:
and his truth endureth to all generations.

Gott Vater in dem höchsten Thron
und Jesus Christus, seinem Sohn,
dem Tröster auch, dem Heilgen Geist,
sei immerdar Lob, Ehr und Preis.

Denicke based his poem on the four stanzas from the Becker Psalter, which are a close paraphrase of the psalm verses, titled "100. Psalm. Christus, ein gnädiger Herr." (... Christ, a merciful Lord). Following the reformer Martin Luther, the psalms were interpreted as related to Christ. Denicke's version is in iambic metre, and has been described as a piece of art, with clear diction, close use of the Biblical images, and a modest "voice".

The two editors of the Hannoversches Gesangbuch note in their foreword that their intention is clear language without poetic artistry, following the standards by Martin Opitz. In the first stanza, Denicke added to the topics of psalm text the idea "säumet nicht" (do not postpone), giving praise and service of God highest priority. The second stanza emphasizes that we are creatures compared to sheep. While Denicke wrote "zu Schafen" (as sheep), a later ecumenical version replaced it by "als guter Hirt" (as the good shepherd), a phrase from Psalm 23.

The fourth stanza begins "Die ihr nun wollet bei ihm sein", pointing to the willingness to be close to God. While the psalm meant literally "the Temple in Jerusalem", Denicke means any place where praise and service take place. The fifth stanza adds that the praise of God is "unser Amt" (our office), interpreted as a service rendered voluntarily. The sixth stanza adds, to the Biblical "Gnade und Wahrheit" (mercy and truth), "Güte, Liebe und Treue" (goodness, love and faithfulness".

== Melody and settings ==
The melody assigned to Denicke's hymn, in triple metre, first appeared in the 14th century Moosburg Cantionale. It was originally used for a Christmas carol. The melody appears in the 1646 hymnal as one of eleven melodies in the appendix. In its 1657 edition, it is associated with "Nun jauchzt dem Herren, alle Welt".

The melody begins with the tonic in low range, rises a fifth and returns to the first note at the end of the first line. The second line moves up an octave, beginning with a bold leap of a fifth. The third and forth line return to the tonic almost in symmetry. The melody has been described as joyful and graceful ("Freude und Anmut"). The outline of the melody has been compared to a gate (Tor), fitting for the phrase "geht zu seinen Toren ein" (enter through his gates). The melody matches the text well, making "Nun jauchzt dem Herren, alle Welt" one of the most popular psalm songs, sung ecumenically.

=== Musical settings ===
Between 1953 and 1962, Johannes Petzold composed six different settings of the hymn, for voices and for instruments. Karl Norbert Schmid composed a song cantata (Liedkantate) for congregation, choir, organ and winds ad lib. in 1986. Francesco Giannoni composed a chorale prelude in 2007. Enjott Schneider wrote a Fantasie for choir, organ and congregational singing, commissioned for the 150th anniversary of the Deutscher Cäcilienverein celebrated at the Regensburg Cathedral in 2018.

== Cited sources ==
- Drömann, Hans Christian (2011). "288 "Nun jauchzt dem Herren, alle Welt"". In Herbst, Wolfgang; Alpermann, Ilsabe (eds.). Liederkunde zum Evangelischen Gesangbuch (in German). Vandenhoeck & Ruprecht. pp. 14–18. ISBN 978-3-64-750302-8.
- Adalbert Elschenbroich (1957). "Denicke, David". Neue Deutsche Biographie (in German). Vol. 3. Berlin: Duncker & Humblot. p. 595. (full text online).
- Kirschbaum, Christa (9 August 2014). "Nun jauchzt dem Herren alle Welt (EG 288)" (in German). WDR.
- Merten, Werner (2001). "Denicke, David". In Herbst, Wolfgang (ed.). Wer ist wer im Gesangbuch? (in German). Vandenhoeck & Ruprecht. pp. 75–76, 131. ISBN 978-3-52-550323-2.
- Schneider, Enjott (2018). "Nun jauchzt dem Herren / Fantasie für Chor und Orgel". enjott.com (in German).
- "Nun jauchzt dem Herren, alle Welt". evangeliums.net (in German).
- "144 / Nun jauchzt dem Herren, alle Welt (L) / Gesänge – Woche – Gesänge zur Eröffnung". mein-gotteslob.de (in German). 2013.
- "Nun jauchzt dem Herren, alle Welt!". hymnary.org. 2018.
- "All people that on earth do dwell". hymnary.org. 2020.
- "Hannoversches Gesangbuch". Canterbury Dictionary of Hymnology. 2020.
