= Psalm 100 =

100th psalm in the Book of Psalms in the Hebrew Bible

- "Make a joyful noise unto the Lord, all ye lands."
- Hymn psalm
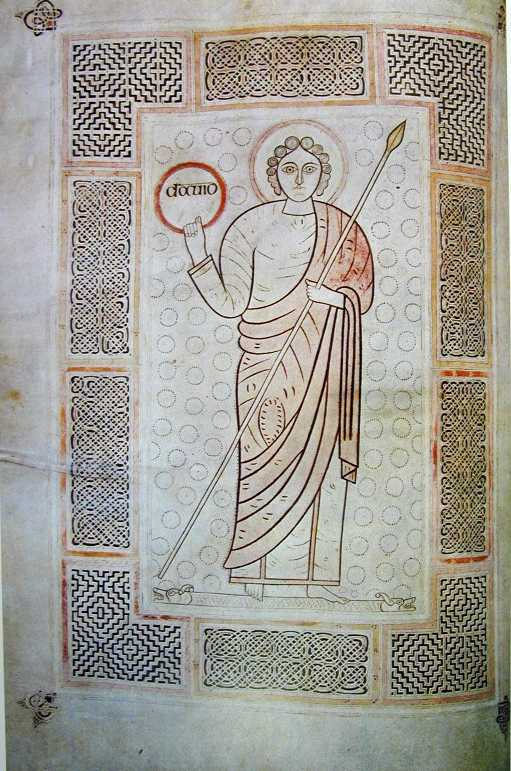
- Miniature of David, in the 8th-century psalter Durham Cassiodorus, Northumbria
- Other name: Jubilate Deo, a.k.a. Psalm 99 in the Septuagint/Vulgate numbering
- Language: Hebrew (original)

Psalm 100
- ← Psalm 99 Psalm 101 →
- Book: Book of Psalms
- Hebrew Bible part: Ketuvim
- Order in the Hebrew part: 1
- Category: Sifrei Emet
- Christian Bible part: Old Testament
- Order in the Christian part: 19

Psalm 100 is the 100th psalm in the Book of Psalms in the Tanakh. In English, it is translated as "Make a joyful noise unto the Lord, all ye lands" in the King James Version (KJV), and as "O be joyful in the Lord, all ye lands" in the Book of Common Prayer (BCP). Its Hebrew name is מִזְמוֹר לְתוֹדָה, 'Mizmor l'Todah' and it is subtitled a "Psalm of gratitude confession". In the slightly different numbering system in the Greek Septuagint version of the Bible, and in the Latin Vulgate, this psalm is Psalm 99. In the Vulgate, it begins Jubilate Deo (alternatively: "Iubilate Domino"), or Jubilate, which also became the title of the BCP version.

People who have translated the psalm range from Martin Luther to Catherine Parr, and translations have ranged from Parr's elaborate English that doubled many words, through metrical hymn forms, to attempts to render the meaning of the Hebrew as idiomatically as possible in a modern language (of the time). The psalm, being a hymn psalm, has been paraphrased in many hymns, such as "All people that on earth do dwell" in English, and "Nun jauchzt dem Herren, alle Welt" in German.

The psalm forms a regular part of Jewish, Catholic, Lutheran, Anglican and other Protestant liturgies, and has been set to music many times over the centuries. Many composers have set it in Latin, and also in English, because the Jubilate is part of daily Morning Prayer in the Book of Common Prayer. It also features in Te Deum and Jubilate compositions, such as Handel's Utrecht Te Deum and Jubilate. It has also been set in German by many composers, including Mendelssohn's Jauchzet dem Herrn, alle Welt, and Reger's Der 100. Psalm. In Hebrew, it constitutes the bulk of the first movement of Bernstein's Chichester Psalms.

== Text ==
The following table shows the Hebrew text of the Psalm with vowels, alongside the Koine Greek text in the Septuagint and the English translation from the King James Version. Note that the meaning can slightly differ between these versions, as the Septuagint and the Masoretic Text come from different textual traditions. (Note: A 1917 translation directly from Hebrew to English by the Jewish Publication Society can be found here or here, and an 1844 translation directly from the Septuagint by L. C. L. Brenton can be found here. Both translations are in the public domain.) In the Septuagint, this psalm is numbered Psalm 99.

#	Hebrew	English	Greek
1	מִזְמ֥וֹר לְתוֹדָ֑ה הָרִ֥יעוּ לַ֝יהֹוָ֗ה כׇּל־הָאָֽרֶץ׃	(A Psalm of praise.) Make a joyful noise unto the Lord, all ye lands.	Ψαλμὸς εἰς ἐξομολόγησιν. - ΑΛΑΛΑΞΑΤΕ τῷ Κυρίῳ, πᾶσα ἡ γῆ,
2	עִבְד֣וּ אֶת־יְהֹוָ֣ה בְּשִׂמְחָ֑ה בֹּ֥אוּ לְ֝פָנָ֗יו בִּרְנָנָֽה׃	Serve the Lord with gladness: come before his presence with singing.	δουλεύσατε τῷ Κυρίῳ ἐν εὐφροσύνῃ, εἰσέλθετε ἐνώπιον αὐτοῦ ἐν ἀγαλλιάσει.
3	דְּע֗וּ כִּֽי־יְהֹוָה֮ ה֤וּא אֱלֹ֫הִ֥ים הֽוּא־עָ֭שָׂנוּ (ולא) [וְל֣וֹ] אֲנַ֑חְנוּ עַ֝מּ֗וֹ וְצֹ֣אן מַרְעִיתֽוֹ׃	Know ye that the Lord he is God: it is he that hath made us, and not we ourselves: we are his people, and the sheep of his pasture.	γνῶτε ὅτι Κύριος, αὐτός ἐστιν ὁ Θεὸς ἡμῶν, αὐτὸς ἐποίησεν ἡμᾶς καὶ οὐχ ἡμεῖς· ἡμεῖς δὲ λαὸς αὐτοῦ καὶ πρόβατα τῆς νομῆς αὐτοῦ.
4	בֹּ֤אוּ שְׁעָרָ֨יו ׀ בְּתוֹדָ֗ה חֲצֵרֹתָ֥יו בִּתְהִלָּ֑ה הוֹדוּ־ל֝֗וֹ בָּרְכ֥וּ שְׁמֽוֹ׃	Enter into his gates with thanksgiving, and into his courts with praise: be thankful unto him, and bless his name.	εἰσέλθετε εἰς τὰς πύλας αὐτοῦ ἐν ἐξομολογήσει, εἰς τὰς αὐλὰς αὐτοῦ ἐν ὕμνοις. ἐξομολογεῖσθε αὐτῷ, αἰνεῖτε τὸ ὄνομα αὐτοῦ,
5	כִּי־ט֣וֹב יְ֭הֹוָה לְעוֹלָ֣ם חַסְדּ֑וֹ וְעַד־דֹּ֥ר וָ֝דֹ֗ר אֱמוּנָתֽוֹ׃	For the Lord is good, his mercy is everlasting: and his truth endureth to all generations.	ὅτι χρηστὸς Κύριος, εἰς τὸν αἰῶνα τὸ ἔλεος αὐτοῦ, καὶ ἕως γενεᾶς καὶ γενεᾶς ἡ ἀλήθεια αὐτοῦ.

In the KJV, the Qere "and his we are" is recorded as marginalia; which was to become the translation used in the main body text by the time of the Revised Version. Other marginalia provide "all the earth" and "to generation and generation" from the Hebrew for verses 1 and 5.

=== Latin ===
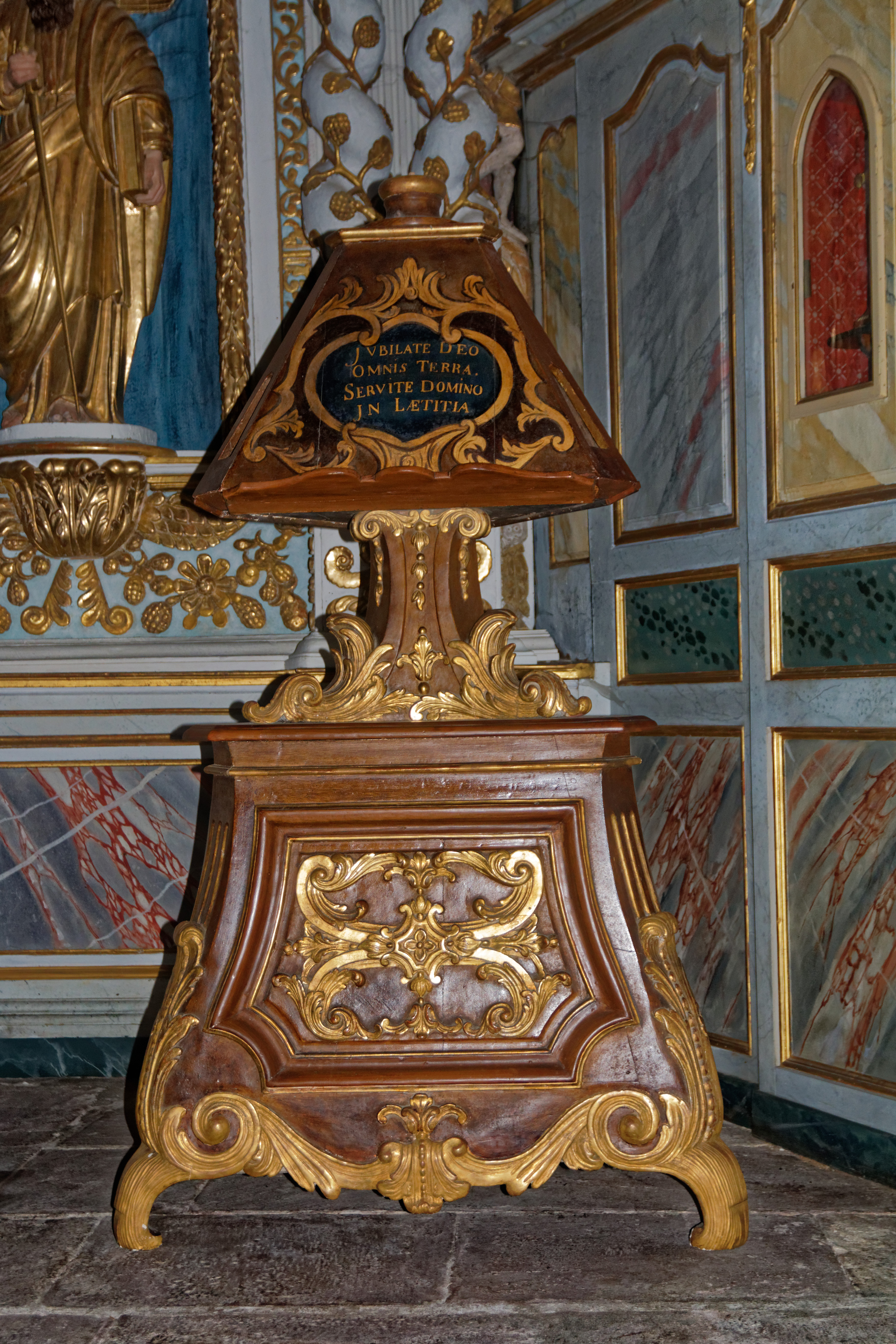
The lectern at the church of Saint-Étienne in Espelette is inscribed with the first verse from the Vulgate.

The psalm is number 99 in the Vulgate:

1. Jubilate Deo omnis terra : servite Domino in lætitia.
2. Introite in conspectu ejus : in exsultatione.
3. Scitote quoniam Dominus ipse est Deus : ipse fecit nos, et non ipsi nos.
4. Populus ejus, et oves pascuæ ejus, introite portas ejus in confessione : atria ejus in hymnis, confitemini illi.
5. Laudate nomen ejus, quoniam suavis est Dominus; in æternum misericordia ejus : et usque in generationem et generationem veritas ejus.

Jerome's Hebraica veritas—which is to say, his versio iuxta Hebraeos—reads "et ipsius sumus" in verse 3.

A different Latin form of the psalm is to be found in Elizabeth I's Preces Private of 1564, where it is numbered psalm 100. Contrast its first two verses:

1. Jubilate in honorem Domini, quotquot in terra versamini.
2. Colite Dominum com laetitia, venite in conspectum ipsius cum exultatione.

Traditionally in the Roman Catholic Church, this psalm was chanted in abbeys during the celebration of matins on Fridays, according to the schema of St. Benedict of Nursia. As one of the most important psalms, Psalm 100 (99) was similarly sung for the solemn office of Lauds on Sunday.

In the 1970 reform of the Liturgy of the Hours, Psalm 100 is one of four Invitatory psalms which can introduce the daily office hours. It is recited at Lauds on the Fridays of the first and third weeks of the four week cycle of liturgical prayers. Psalm 100 is also present among the readings of the office of the Mass: found on January 5 after the Octave of Christmas, and on the fourth Sunday of Eastertide. It also appears six times in Ordinary Time: Thursday of the 8th week, the Friday of the 22nd week, Tuesday and Friday of the 24th week, the Monday of the 29th week, and on Thursday of the 34th week of Ordinary Time.

Because of its text and its subject, this psalm is still one of the most important liturgical chants, during the celebration of the Jubilee every 25 years in Rome. It is sung when the bishop opened the Door of Mercy.

The Old English text in the Vespasian Psalter is not an idiomatic translation but a word for word substitution, an interlinear gloss, of the Vulgate Latin:

1. Wynsumiað gode, all eorðe: ðiowiaƌ Dryhtne in blisse;
2. ingað in gesihðe his: in wynsumnisse.

The Hebrew text of the psalm comprises 5 verses. Unusually for a Biblical poem, it solely comprises tricolons, verses 1 and 2 (a monocolon and a bicolon respectively) combining into a tricolon, and the remaining verses all being tricolons. (One scholar, Jan P. Fokkelman, dissents and takes verse 4 to be two bicolons.) It is usually divided into two strophes, verses 1–3 and verses 4–5.

The first two words Hebrew: מזמור לתודה, romanized: Mizmor l'Todah are the title of the psalm, naming it a song for a specific thanksgiving sacrifice in Solomon's Temple made in order to fulfil a vow. This is recorded in Shevu'ot in the Babylonian Talmud, stating it to be sung "with harps and cymbals and music on every corner and every large boulder in Jerusalem". Mediaeval commentator Rashi, who made the correspondence between Shevu'ot's "song of todah" and Psalm 100, stated that the psalm is to be said "upon the sacrifices of the todah", which was expanded upon by David Altschuler in the 18th century stating that it is to be recited "by the one bringing a korban todah for a miracle that happened to him".

The bracketed part of verse 3 is an instance of Qere and Ketiv in the Masoretic Text. In the body of the text is the Hebrew word לא, lo' meaning "not" whereas the marginalia has the substitute לו, lô meaning "to him". One Kabbalistic explanation for the qere reading ולו of the literal ketiv ולא propounded by Asher ben David is that the א (Aleph) represents God, and the ketiv is supposed to read "we are The Aleph's", in other words (given that God has already been mentioned, by two names, earlier in the verse) "we are his" per the qere.

A less established thesis, first propounded in the 1960s (in Lewis 1967), is that the Ketiv text is an asseverative particle, connected to the following phrase and thus as a whole translated as "and indeed we are his people". Whilst this avoids the problem of the Qere reading making the verse say the same thing twice, it has not gained wide scholarly acceptance. Professor David M. Howard Jr rejects it on constructionist grounds, as the syllabic imbalance in the colon lengths that it introduces outweighs for him what little variance in meaning it has from the Qere reading. Professor John Goldingay rejects it as "unlikely".

Although only Psalm 90 is directly attributed to Moses, it is conventional Jewish doctrine that Moses composed all of psalms 90 to 100, and this view is maintained by Rashi.

== In Jewish liturgy ==
The psalm occurs in several siddurim but it is unknown exactly how or when this specific thanksgiving became a part of the daily prayer, being recited as part of the Songs of thanksgiving (Pesukei dezimra).

Psalm 100 is traditionally omitted, as mentioned by Rashi's student Simcha ben Samuel and discussed in detail by 14th century writer David ben Joseph ben David Abduraham, on Shabbat and festivals because the Thanksgiving offering was not offered on these days in the Temple. Only communal offerings were brought on these days. It is also omitted by Ashkenazim on the day before Pesach and during Chol HaMoed Pesach because the Thanksgiving offering is composed of a loaf of bread, which is chametz that may not be consumed during Pesach, and the day before Yom Kippur because no food is consumed at all on Yom Kippur; however, most Sephardic communities do recite it on these three occasions (but not on Shabbat of Festivals).

However, Amram Gaon did the opposite, omitting this psalm from the daily liturgy but including it in the morning prayer for Shabbat, and this is the practice in the Italian Nusach today.

Additionally, most Sephardic communities recite this Psalm as part of Kabbalat Shabbat.

Verse 2, "Ivdu es-Hashem b'simcha" (Serve the Lord with joy) is a popular inspirational song in Judaism.

=== Geddes ===
The 1807 translation by Alexander Geddes for Catholics demonstrates some of the alternative choices set out in the translation notes section below:

1. A EUCHARISTIC PSALM.
  CELEBRATE Jehovah, all ye lands !
2. with joyfulness worship Jehovah !
  Come into his presence with exultation.
3. Know that Jehovah is the only God :
  It was he who made us, and his we are;
  his own people, and the flock of his pasture.
4. With thanksgiving enter into his gates;
  into his courts with songs of praise.
  To him be thankful, and bless his name :
5. For good is Jehovah ! everlasting his bounty !
  and his veracity from generation to generation.

=== Driver and BCP ===
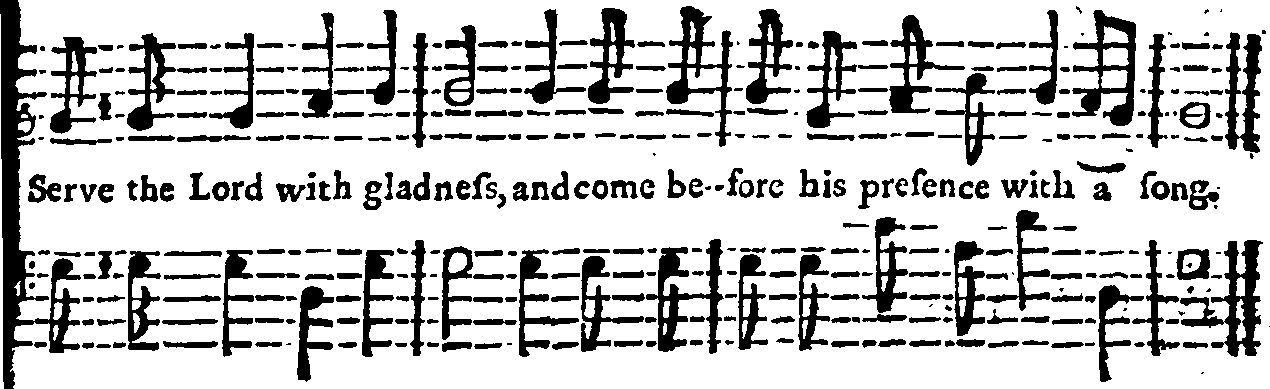
The second part of verse 1 in the BCP translation, set to a chanting tune in James Green's 1738 A Book of Psalmody at the Internet Archive

Samuel Rolles Driver's Parallel Psalter has the Prayer Book translation of psalm 100 on a verso page. It is identical to the Jubilate Deo, sans Gloria, from the Book of Common Prayer, intentionally retaining the use of "O" for the vocative amongst other things:

1. O be joyful in the Lord, all ye lands : serve the Lord with gladness, and come before his presence with a song.
2. Be ye sure that the Lord he is God : it is he that hath made us, and not we ourselves; we are his people, and the sheep of his pasture.
3. O go your way into his gates with thanksgiving, and into his courts with praise : be thankful unto him, and speak good of his Name.
4. For the Lord is gracious, his mercy is everlasting : and his truth endureth from generation to generation.

The beginning of verse 1 here is the same as Psalm 66 verse 1 and Psalm 98 verse 4.

His own 1898 translation is on a facing recto page. It exhibits several of the differences in modern translations that are explained in the below translation notes section.

1. Shout unto Jehovah, all the earth.
2. Serve Jehovah with gladness;
  come before his presence with a ringing cry.
3. Know ye that Jehovah he is God :
  it is he that hath made us, and we are his;
  (we are) his people, and the flock of his pasture.
4. O enter into his gates with thanksgiving,
  (and) into his courts with praise :
  give thanks unto him, bless his name.
5. For Jehovah is good, his kindness (endureth) for ever,
  and his faithfulness unto all generations.

For "pasture" in verse 3 he gives "shepherding" as an alternative, and for "thanksgiving" in verse 4 "a thank-offering".

Psalm 100 was one of the fixed psalms in the older Anglican liturgy for office of lauds on Sundays, and the Prayer Book translation given by Driver (with an added Gloria) is a part of the order of morning prayer in the Book of Common Prayer under the title Jubilate Deo, or just Jubilate. It was added to the BCP litany in 1552, as a substitute for the Benedictus to be used only on days when it so happened that the second Lesson prescribed for the day happened to already include that part of the Gospel of Luke.

=== Kethe ===
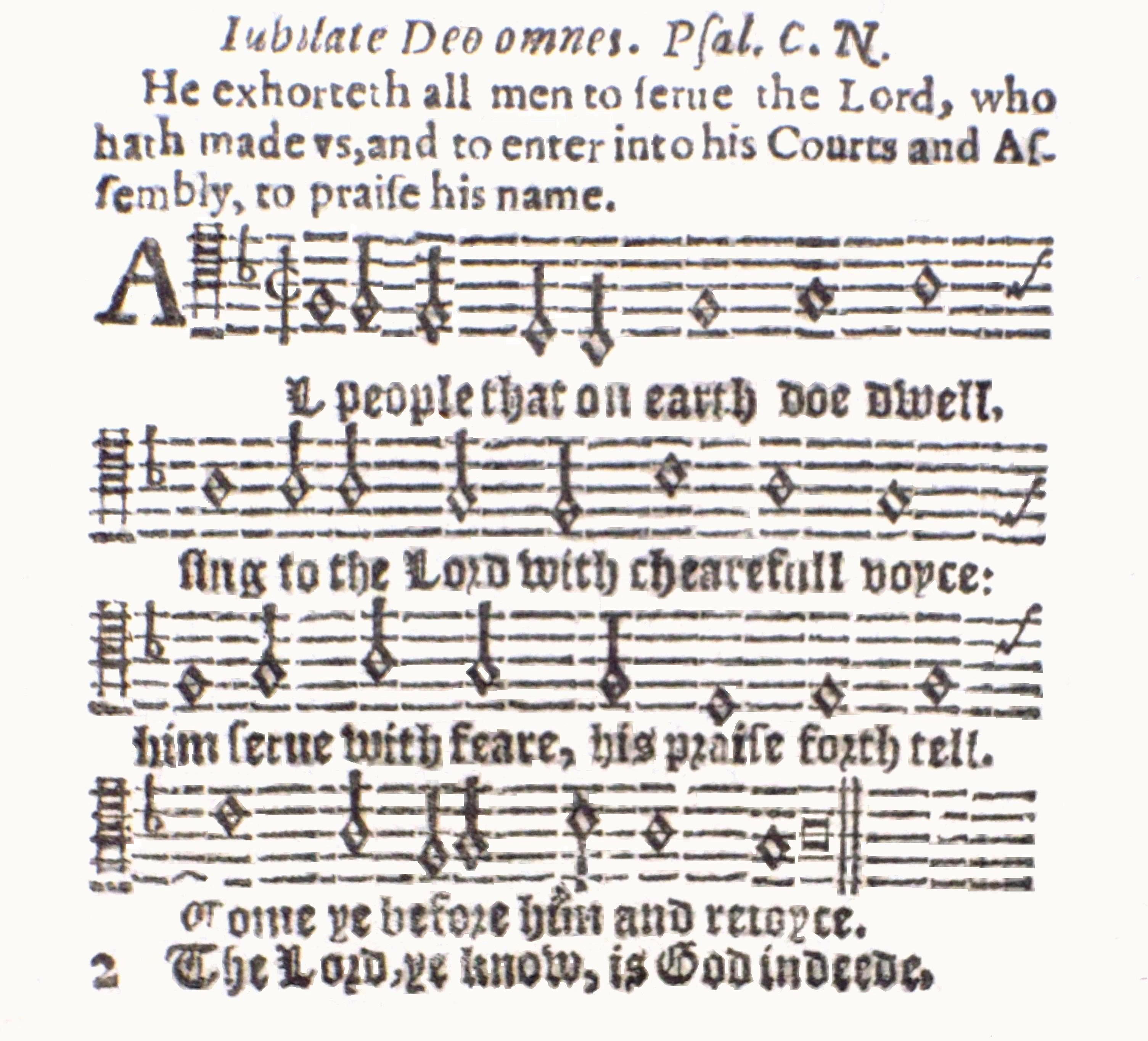
The melody for Loys Bourgeois's Old 100th with Kethe's translation, from a 1628 publication

William Kethe's translation is in long metre, and formed part of a collection of psalms translated into metrical form in English, the 1562 expanded 150-psalm edition of Thomas Sternhold's and John Hopkins's 1549 metrical psalter (Day's Psalter). First appearing in Fourscore and Seven Psalms of David (the so-called Genevan Psalter) the year before, it divides the verses in the same way as the Book of Common Prayer:

1. All people that on earth do dwell, sing to the Lord with cheerful voice: him serve with fear, his praise forth tell, come ye before him and rejoice!
2. The Lord, ye know, is God indeed, without our aid he did us make; we are his flock he doth us feed, and for his sheep he doth us take.
3. O enter then his gates with praise, approach with joy his courts unto; praise, laud, and bless his Name always, for it is seemly so to do.
4. For why? the Lord our God is good, his mercy is for ever sure; his truth at all times firmly stood, and shall from age to age endure.

Of all of the psalms in the Sternhold and Hopkins psalter, Kethe's translation is the most famous and lasting, it being a popular hymn usually set to the tune "Old 100th". Hannibal Hamlin, a professor of English, observes that it suffers from common ailments of strophic song settings, that the first verse fits a tune better than subsequent verses and that the phrasing has a tendency towards the convoluted. Hamlin holds up "him serve with fear", with an unusual object-verb-object ordering for the imperative in English (which would in colloquial English more usually be "serve him with fear"), followed by a similarly unusual word order in "his praise forth tell", as examples of the latter. The former is exemplified by the drawn-out end of the second line of the tune "Old 100th" fitting "cheerful voice" better than it does "courts unto" and "ever sure".

Biblical scholar J. Clinton McCann Jr characterises this translation of the psalm as "the banner hymn of the Reformed tradition", and observes that the psalm would have provided an excellent basis, better than that of the Book of Genesis, for the Westminster Confession of Faith's declaration of the primary purpose of humans being to glorify God.

=== Luther ===
Martin Luther translated the psalm into German, including the Hebrew title in the first verse (like Geddes) with the psalm under the title Der 100. Psalm:

1. Ein Dankpsalm. Jauchzet dem Herrn, alle Welt.
2. Dienet dem Herrn mit Freuden; kommt vor sein Angesicht mit Frohlocken.
3. Erkennet, daß der Herr Gott ist. Er hat uns gemacht, und nicht wir selbst zu seinem Volk, und zu Schafen seiner Weide.
4. Gehet zu seinen Toren ein mit Danken, zu seinen Vorhöfen mit Loben; danket ihm, lobet seinen Namen.
5. Denn der Herr ist freundlich, und seine Gnade währet ewig, und seine Wahrheit für und für.

=== Watts/Wesley ===
Hymnals sometimes attribute "Before Jehovah's awful throne", another translation of the psalm in hymn form common in Methodism, to Isaac Watts, but this is only partly true. Watts translated Psalm 100 twice, to form a hymn comprising two parts that was first published in Psalms of David Imitated, the first subtitled "a plain translation", whose first verse was:

1. Ye nations of the Earth rejoice, Before the Lord your sovereign King; Serve him with cheerful heart and voice; With all your tongues his glory sing.

and the second subtitled "a paraphrase", whose first two verses (as later re-published) were:

1. Sing to the Lord with joyful voice; Let ev'ry land his name adore; The British isles shall send the noise Across the ocean to the shore.
2. Nations attend before his throne, With solemn fear and sacred joy: Know that the Lord is God alone; He can create, and he destroy.

The second verse of the paraphrase was a rewrite, Watts' original in the 1706 Horae Lyricae reading:

2. With gladness bow before his throne, And let his presence raise your joys, Know that the Lord is God alone, And form'd our Souls, and fram'd our voice.

No version of Watts contained the line about the "awful throne". That was a revision by John Wesley for his 1737 Collection of Psalms and Hymns, who discarded Watts' first verse of part 2 entirely, and rewrote its now-first verse (that verse's second rewrite) to include the line by which it is known:

1. Before Jehovah's awful throne, Ye nations, bow with sacred joy; Know that the Lord is God alone; He can create, and he destroy.

The word "awful" is used here in its older, 18th century, meaning, and some modern reprints of Watts/Wesley spell it "awe-ful" to make this clear. Other hymnals revised it further, instead; in the Lutheran book of worship it is "Before Jehovah's awesome throne", and in the 1982 Episcopal Hymnal it is "Before the Lord's eternal throne".

=== Others ===
There are other translations of the psalm in hymn form and otherwise, including "Before the Lord Jehovah's Throne" (number 306 in the Presbyterian The Worshipbook), "Sing, All Creation" (set to the tune of Rouen's "Iste Confessor" in Morning Praise and Evensong), the metrical "O be joyful in the Lord, Sing before him, all the earth" (number 482 in The Worshipbook), and Joseph Gelineau's "Cry Out with Joy to the Lord" in his Gradual.

Catherine Parr's Psalms or Prayers contains an elaborate translation into English, from the Elizabethan Latin translation, that doubles most of the imperative verbs and some of the adjectives and nouns. "Jubilate" becomes, for example "Rejoice and sing"; and "colite" becomes "worship and serve".

=== Translation notes ===
As aforementioned, verse 3 contains an instance of Qere and Ketiv in the Masoretic Text. The KJV translation "and not we ourselves" is based upon the ketiv, and agrees with the Septuagint and Vulgate translations; the New American Standard Bible and the Darby Bible also agreeing. More modern translations such as those of the New International Version and the English Standard Version are based upon the qere, and read "and we are his". Geddes opined in a footnote to his translation that the KJV/Septuagint translation is "totally inadmissable". Wilhelm Martin Leberecht de Wette, in his German translation of the Psalm, likewise gave the translation "und sein sind wir", noting that the ketiv translation "und nicht wir" (as given by Luther) is "ganz unschicklich".

The historicist argument in support of following the qere over the ketiv is that the ketiv simply makes no sense in context. There was simply no contemporary Biblical world view in which people believed that they created themselves. It is bolstered by a constructionist argument that the structure of the psalm is better taking the qere reading, as in that way each part of the second half of the verse contains a pronoun or possessive suffix referencing the names of God in the first half. Robert Lowth, writing in James Merrick's 1768 Annotations on the Psalms, said that "I am persuaded that the Masoretical correction [...] is right: the construction and parallelism both favour it."

The Old English metrical form of Psalm 100, associated with the Paris Psalter, similarly gives "we his syndon" ("we belong to him"). Scholarship on this rests on the 19th century Ph.D. thesis of Helen Bartlett. Bartlett, like the parallel Old-English and Latin psalters of earlier in the 19th century (e.g. Thorpe 1835, p. 271), only compares the Old English translation with the Vulgate Latin (also using the Vulgate numbering), not with the Latin of Jerome, and ascribes "we his syndon" to a mistranslation of the Vulgate "et non ipsi nos" that overlooks "non" and misconstrues a dative, rather than to Jerome's "et ipsius sumus".

Lost in the English translation is that all of the imperative verbs in the Hebrew are in the plural. The phrase "make a joyful noise" is significantly longer than the Hebrew, which is just one word (as is the Latin); and translators aiming to preserve the text more literally use verbs such as "acclaim", "hail", or "shout" (as Driver did). Also lost in most English translations is the use of the vocative, although the Book of Common Prayer translation retained this by use of "O", as did the original Prayer Book translation that Driver gave. Hermann Gunkel translated the end of verse 1 as "all the land", i.e. all of the land of Israel, rather than the more generally accepted modern translation of "all the Earth", i.e. everyone; a point upon which James Luther Mays commented that "Gunkel's historicism led him astray".

== Musical settings ==
=== In Latin ===
The Jubilate in Latin was set to music often, including works by Giovanni Pierluigi da Palestrina in 1575, Giovanni Gabrieli, Guillaume Bouzignac, Charles-Hubert Gervais, Mondonville (1734) and Michel-Richard de Lalande as his S.72/5. Fernando de las Infantas' setting was composed for the Jubilee of 1575. One of the surviving manuscripts of the grand motets by Jean-Baptiste Lully is a setting of the Jubilate Deo, catalogue number LWV 77/16; there is doubt as to its authenticity, and whether it is the same piece as Jean Loret reported performed on 29 August 1660 at the monastery of La Mercy in Paris to celebrate "le Mariage et la Paix" (the marriage of Louis XIV and the peace with Spain). Marc-Antoine Charpentier set Jubilate Deo omnis terra, H.194, for three voices, two treble instruments and continuo in 1683.

Both Wolfgang Amadeus Mozart, and his father Leopold Mozart wrote a setting.

=== In English ===
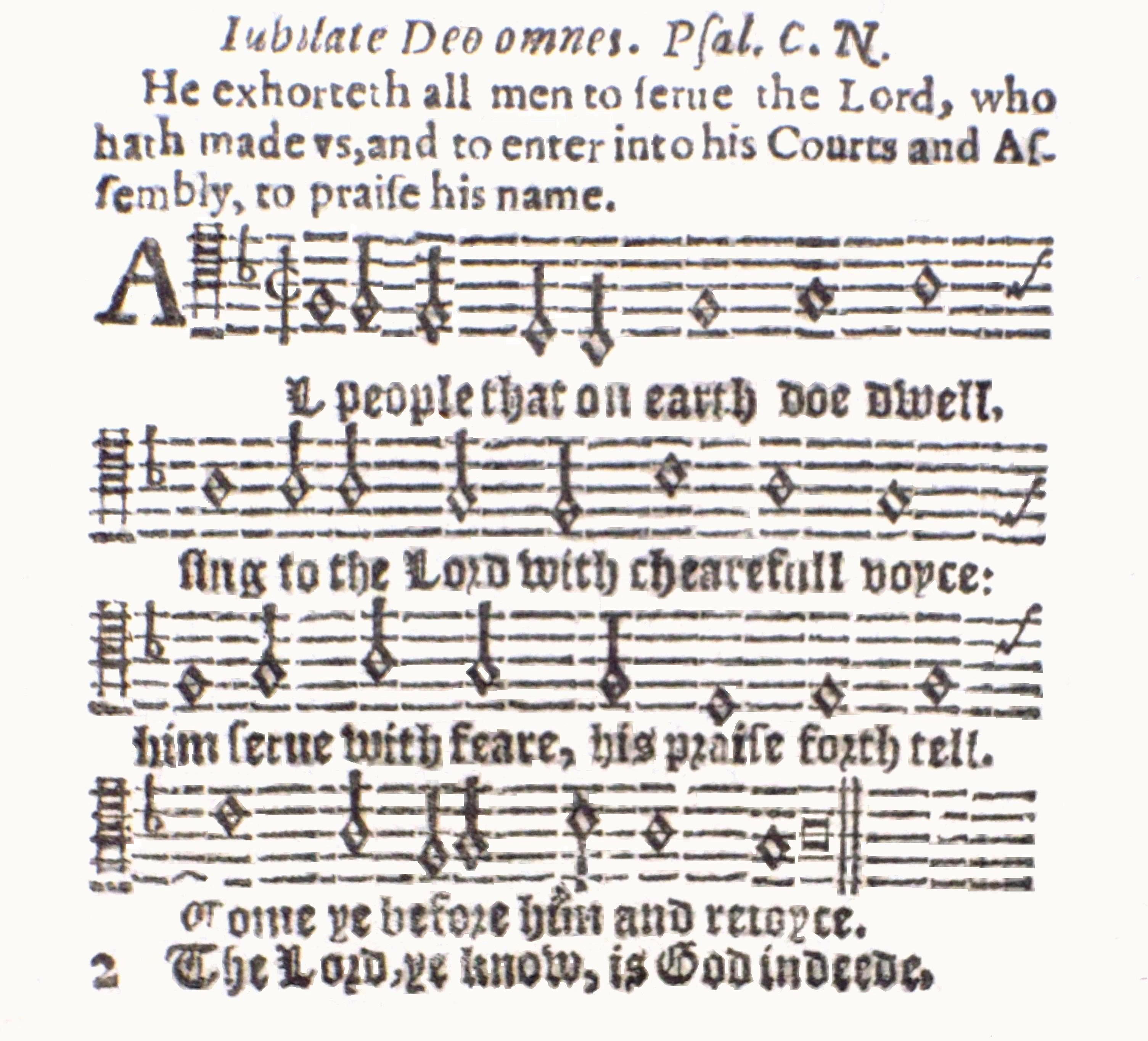
The melody for Loys Bourgeois's Old 100th with Kethe's translation, from a 1628 publication

William Kethe's metric translation of Psalm 100, "All people that on earth do dwell", became a popular hymn with the melody by Loys Bourgeois from the Genevan Psalter, Old 100th. John Dowland composed two settings of the text; one in a book of Psalms published by Thomas East in 1592, and a more rhythmically complex version published in 1621 by Thomas Ravenscroft.

The Jubilate or Jubilate Deo in English is part of the daily Anglican morning liturgy of the Book of Common Prayer, and has been set to music by many composers. Henry Purcell included it in his Te Deum and Jubilate, and George Frideric Handel in his Utrecht Te Deum and Jubilate; both composers took the approach of one movement for each verse, Handel splitting the BCP verse 1 back into its constituent two original Hebrew verses, with one movement each. Charles Villiers Stanford's setting was part of his innovative Morning, Evening and Communion Service in B♭, and the Jubilate Deo was first performed on 25 May 1879. Ralph Vaughan Williams composed two settings of the psalm, The Hundredth Psalm a choral cantata in 1929 using the BCP translation, and The Old Hundredth Psalm Tune in 1952 using Kethe's translation, which was used for the coronation of Elizabeth II and had parts for SATB, organ, orchestra, and congregation. Other settings have been written by composers including John Gardner, Herbert Howells, John Ireland, Richard Purvis, George Dyson, Kenneth Leighton, William Walton, and John Rutter. Benjamin Britten composed his Jubilate Deo in C in 1961.

=== In German ===
The hymn "Nun jauchzt dem Herren, alle Welt" is a 1646 paraphrase of Psalm 100 by David Denicke.

Heinrich Schütz set Psalm 100 to music several times, first as part of his Psalmen Davids of polychoral psalms in German, published in 1619, Jauchzet dem Herren, alle Welt, SVW 36, set for double choir with echo effects. He wrote a setting of a metred paraphrase of the psalm, "Jauchzet dem Herren, alle Welt", SWV 198, for the Becker Psalter, published first in 1628. Finally, he composed a setting as part of his Opus Ultimum, the motet (SWV 493) being the first that he composed of the 13 motets in that work for the re-consecration of the Dresden church after its renovation on 28 September 1662. It was believed lost until it was reconstructed in 1981 by Wolfram Steude. A pasticcio motet Jauchzet dem Herrn alle Welt was composed by Georg Philipp Telemann or Johann Sebastian Bach, and Gottlob Harrer: The text of the first movement of Bach's Christmas Oratorio, Jauchzet, frohlocket!, is a paraphrase of the psalm.

Felix Mendelssohn set the psalm to music for eight voices as Jauchzet dem Herrn, alle Welt, composed in 1844 (and published posthumously in 1855) as well as for eight voices again in the second movement of his Three Motets, Opus 69; the last sacred work he completed in 1847, the year of his death. Max Reger entitled his 1906 setting of Luther's translation, a choral symphony, Der 100. Psalm.

=== In Hebrew ===
Leonard Bernstein set the Hebrew text of Psalm 100 to music in his Chichester Psalms, the whole psalm forming the majority of the first movement. Other settings were written by Malcolm Arnold and Charles Ives.

== See also ==
- Hakarat HaTov
