= Gesenius =

Gesenius is a surname. Notable people with the surname include:

- Justus Gesenius (1601–1673), German theologian
- Heinrich Friedrich Wilhelm Gesenius (1786–1842), German orientalist, Biblical critic, theologian, and Hebraist, famous for his Hebrew grammar text and his Biblical Hebrew lexicon
  - Gesenius's Lexicon
  - Gesenius-Kautzsch-Cowley
