= Primary texts of Kabbalah =

Part of Jewish spirituality

The primary texts of Kabbalah were allegedly once part of an ongoing oral tradition. The written texts are obscure and difficult for readers who are unfamiliar with Jewish spirituality which assumes extensive knowledge of the Tanakh (Hebrew Bible), Midrash (Jewish hermeneutic tradition) and halakha (Jewish religious law).

== The Torah ==
For kabbalists, ten utterances in Genesis with which God created the world are linked to the ten sefirot—the divine structure of all being. According to the Zohar and the Sefer ha-Yihud, the Torah is synonymous with God. More specifically, in the Sefer ha-Yihud, the letters in the Torah are the forms of God. The kabbalist looks beyond the literal aspects of the text, to find the hidden mystical meaning. The text not only offers traditions and ways of thinking, but it also reveals the reality of God. One of the first Jewish philosophers, Philo of Alexandria (20BCE-40), said that Abraham knew the essential Torah, before it was given, because Abraham was himself a philosopher: he observed the world around him and looked inside himself to discover the laws of nature. While this is not strictly speaking a mystical notion, it does introduce the idea of an inner Torah that underlies the written word. Much later, in the 19th century, the Sfas Emes, a Hasidic rebbe, made the assertion that it was actually Abraham's deeds that became Torah. The Torah is thus seen as an ongoing story played out through the lives of the Nation of Israel. The Torah is an important text because even the most minor traditions of the Kabbalah will acknowledge its aspects of the divine.

== Textual antiquity ==
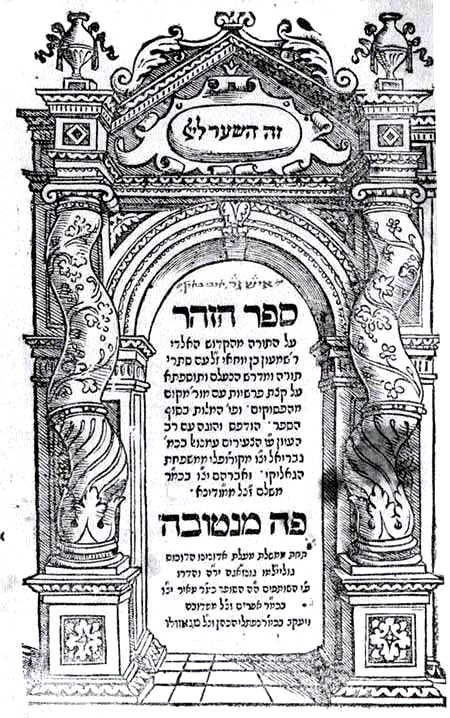
Title page of first edition of the Zohar, Mantua, 1558 (Library of Congress).

Jewish forms of esotericism existed over 2,000 years ago. Ben Sira warns against it, saying: "You shall have no business with secret things". Nonetheless, mystical studies were undertaken and resulted in mystical literature. The first to appear within Judaism was the Apocalyptic literature of the second and first pre-Christian centuries and which contained elements that carried over to later Kabbalah. According to Josephus, such writings were in the possession of the Essenes and were jealously guarded by them against disclosure, for which they claimed a certain antiquity (see Philo, De Vita Contemplativa, iii., and Hippolytus, Refutation of all Heresies, ix. 27).

That books containing secret lore were kept hidden away by (or for) the "enlightened" is stated in 2 Esdras xiv. 45–46, where Pseudo-Ezra is told to publish the twenty-four books of the canon openly that the worthy and the unworthy may alike read, but to keep the seventy other books hidden in order to "deliver them only to such as be wise" (compare Dan. xii. 10); for in them are the spring of understanding, the fountain of wisdom, and the stream of knowledge.

Instructive for the study of the development of Jewish mysticism is the Book of Jubilees written around the time of John Hyrcanus. It refers to mysterious writings of Jared, Cain, and Noah, and presents Abraham as the renewer, and Levi as the permanent guardian, of these ancient writings. It offers a cosmogony based upon the twenty-two letters of the Hebrew alphabet, connected with Jewish chronology and Messianology, while at the same time insisting upon the heptad (7) as the holy number, rather than upon the decadic (10) system adopted by the later haggadists and observable in the Sefer Yetzirah. The Pythagorean idea of the creative powers of numbers and letters was shared with Sefer Yetzirah and was known in the time of the Mishnah before 200 CE.

Early elements of Jewish mysticism can be found in the non-Biblical texts of the Dead Sea Scrolls, such as the Songs of the Sabbath Sacrifice. Some parts of the Talmud and the Midrash also focus on the esoteric and mystical, particularly Hagigah 12b-14b. Many esoteric texts, among them Hekalot Rabbati, Sefer HaKana, Sefer P'liyah, Midrash Otiyot d'Rabbi Akiva, the Bahir, and the Zohar, claim to be from the Tannaitic era (10-220 CE), but all of these works, with the exception of Hekhalot, were actually composed 800-1,000 years later.

Kabbalists attribute Sefer Yetzirah to the patriarch Abraham, though the text itself offers no claim as to authorship and modern scholars consider it medieval. This book, which is noted for its early use of the word "sefirot", became the object of systematic study by medieval mystics.

== Primary texts ==
=== Hekhalot literature ===
Hekhalot literature (Hekhalot, "Palaces") are not a single text. Rather, they are a genre of writings with shared characteristics. These texts focus primarily either on how to achieve a heavenly ascent through the Hekhalot and what to expect there, or on drawing down angelic spirits to interact and help the adept. There are several larger documents of the hekhalot, such as Hekhalot Rabbati, in which six of the seven palaces of God are described, Hekhalot Zutarti, Shi'ur Qomah and sixth-century 3 Enoch, as well as hundreds of small documents, many little more than fragments.

=== Sefer Yetzirah ===
Sefer Yetzirah (סֵפֶר יְצִירָה) ("Book of Creation"), also known as Hilkhot Yetzira ("Laws of Creation"), is a primary source of Kabbalistic teaching. The first commentaries on this small book were written in the 10th century, a book by the title is mentioned in the Talmud, and its linguistic organization of the Hebrew alphabet could be from as early as the 2nd century. Its historical origins remain obscure, although Kabbalists believe that it was authored by Abraham and edited by Rabbi Akiva. It exists today in a number of editions, up to 2,500 words long (about the size of a pamphlet). It organizes the cosmos into "32 paths of wisdom", comprising "10 sefirot" (numbers, not the Sefirot of later Kabbalah) and "22 letters" of the Hebrew alphabet. It uses this structure to organize cosmic phenomena ranging from the seasons of the calendar to the emotions of the intellect, and is essentially an index of cosmic correspondences.

=== Bahir ===
Bahir (בהיר) ("Illumination"), also known as Midrash of Rabbi Nehunya ben HaKana - a book of special interest to students of Kabbalah because it serves as a kind of epitome that surveys the essential concepts of the subsequent literature of Kabbalah. It is about 12,000 words (about the size of a magazine). Despite its name "Illumination", it is notoriously cryptic and difficult to understand (but not impossible). Much of it is written in parables, one after the other. The Bahir opens with a quote attributed to Nehunya ben HaKana, a Talmudic sage of the 1st century, and the rest of the book is an unfolding discussion about the quote. Jewish tradition considers the whole book to be written in the spirit of Nehunya (or even literally written by him). It was first mentioned in Provence in 1176. Historians suspect Isaac the Blind wrote the book at this time, probably incorporating some pre-existing traditions.

=== Sefer Raziel HaMalakh ===
Sefer Raziel HaMalakh (ספר רזיאל המלאך, "Book of Raziel the Angel") is a collection of esoteric writings, probably compiled and edited by the same hand, but originally not the work of one author.

Leopold Zunz ("G. V." 2d ed., p. 176) distinguishes three main parts: (1) the Book Ha-Malbush; (2) the Great Raziel; (3) the Book of Secrets, or the Book of Noah. These three parts are still distinguishable—2b–7a, 7b–33b, 34a and b. After these follow two shorter parts entitled "Creation" and "Shi'ur Ḳomah," and after 41a come formulas for amulets and incantations.

=== Sefer haḤesheq ===
Sefer haḤesheq (Hebrew: ספר החשק "Book of Delight"), a kabbalistic treatise dealing with the Divine names and their efficacy in mystical practices. Passed down by Abraham Abulafia, the information distinguishes between the various methods of kabbalistic transmission to later generations. Abulafia opposes the method he received to the Talmudic and theosophical Sefirotic methods.

In order to understand my intention regarding [the meaning of] Qolot [voices] I shall hand down to you the known Qabbalot, some of them having been received from mouth to mouth from the sages of [our] generation, and others that I have received from the books named Sifrei Qabbalah composed by the ancient sages, the Kabbalists, blessed be their memory, concerning the wondrous topics; and other [traditions) bestowed on me by God, blessed be He, which came to me from ThY in the form of the Daughter of the Voice, [Bat Qol], these being the higher Qabbalot.

=== Zohar ===
Zohar (זהר) ("Splendor") – the most important text of Kabbalah, which mainstream Judaism believes has achieved canonical status as part of the Oral Torah. Although kabbalists attribute it to Simeon ben Yohai, modern academics have speculated that its origin may be the medieval era, c. 1285 CE, and was at least largely composed by Moses de Leon. De Leon himself denied this claim, as recorded by Issac of Acco's investigation, recorded in Sefer Yuchasin. It is a mystical commentary on the Torah, written in an artificial mixture of the Babylonian Aramaic dialects in Targum Onkelos and the Talmud.

=== Pardes Rimonim ===
Pardes Rimonim (in Hebrew: פרדס רימונים) (Garden of Pomegranates) – the magnum opus of Moshe Cordovero (1522–1570), published in the 16th century. It is the main source of Cordoverian Kabbalah, a comprehensive interpretation of the Zohar and a friendly rival of the Lurianic interpretation.

=== Etz Hayim and the Eight Gates ===
Etz Hayim (in Hebrew: עץ חיים) ("Tree [of] Life") is a text of the teachings of Isaac Luria collected by his disciple Chaim Vital. It is the primary interpretation and synthesis of Lurianic Kabbalah. It was first published in the 2010s. The commonly learned Etz Chaim was compiled by Meir Poppers and was first published in Safed in the 16th century, originally called Derech Etz Chaim. It contains the entire basic structure of lurianic Kabbalah, compiled from the early drafts of Chaim Vitals Etz Chaim that were leaked and published during the lifetime of Vital, the 8 gates of Shmuel Vital, and the buried manuscripts of Chaim Vital. The Shemona She'arim (eight gates): is the full Lurianic system as arranged by Shmuel Vital, the son of Haim Vital. Early drafts of Vital's Eitz Hayim were published within Hayim Vital's lifetime, the rest of his writings were either buried (these were Kabbalistic explanations authored by Vital hinself as opposed to strictly Luria's teachings and were buried by Vital himself) or given to his son Shmuel Vital (specifically the final edited Etz Chaim first published in the 21st century). Shmuel Vital compiled the 8 gates based on his fathers Etz Chaim, which also contained 8 gates. Shmuel Vital went on then to redact and publish the works as the Eight Gates which are then, at times subdivided into other works:

1. Shaar HaHakdamot – Gate of Introduction: Otztrot Haim, Eitz Haim, Arbah Meot Shekel Kesef, Mavoa Shaarim, Adam Yashar
2. Shaar Mamri RaShB"Y – Gate Words of R.Simeon bar Yochai
3. Shaar Mamri RaZ"L – Gate Words of Our Sages
4. Shaar HaMitzvot – Gate of Mitzvot commandments
5. Shaar HaPasukim – Gate of Verses: Likutei Torah, Sepher HaLikutim
6. Shaar HaKavanot – Gate of Kavanot (intentions): Shaar HaKavvanot, Pri Eitz Haim, Olat Tamid
7. Shaar Ruach HaKodesh – Gate of Prophetic Spirit
8. Shaar HaGilgulim – Gate of Gilgul reincarnations

Sephardi and Mizrahi Kabbalists endeavor to study all eight gates. Etz Hayim is published standard in a single volume three part arrangement, the initial two parts published by Haim Vital, with a third part, Nahar Shalom by Rabbi Shalom Sharabi, being now considered the third part. Ashkenazi Kabbalists often tend to focus only on Eitz Haim, with explanations of the RaMHaL (Rabbi Moshe Haim Luzzato). However this is not always the case. There are Yeshivot such as Shaar Shmayim that deal with the works of Haim Vital in their entirety.

== See also ==
- Bahir
- Semiphoras and Schemhamphorash
