= Psalmen Davids =

Collection of sacred choral music

- by Heinrich Schütz
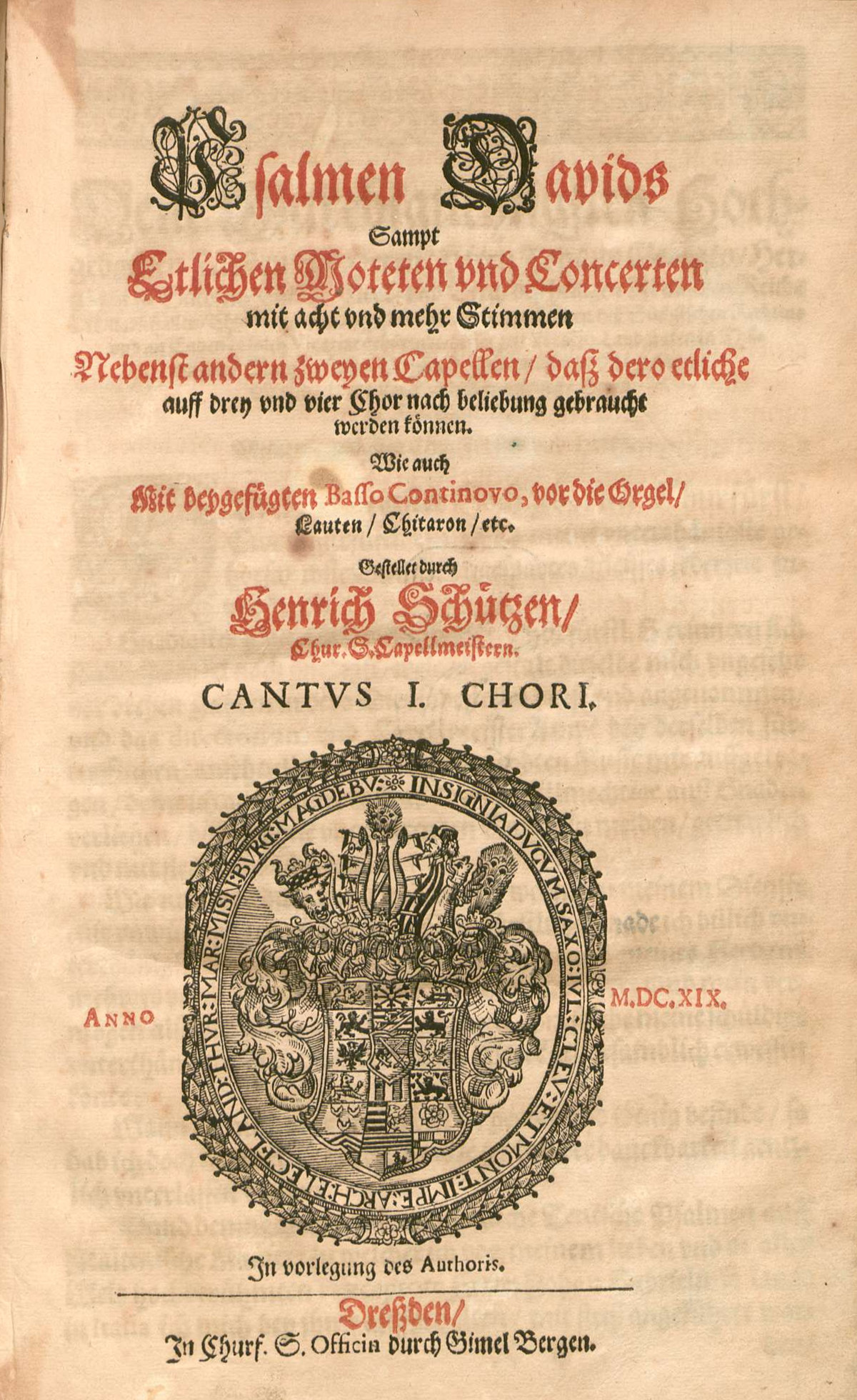
- Title page of the first edition, 1619
- Catalogue: SWV 22 to 47
- Opus: 2
- Genre: Sacred vocal music
- Text: Psalms
- Language: German
- Dedication: Johann Georg I
- Published: 1 June 1619 in Dresden

Psalmen Davids (Psalms of David) is a collection of sacred choral music, settings mostly of psalms in German by Heinrich Schütz, who had studied the Venetian polychoral style with Giovanni Gabrieli. Book 1 was printed in Dresden in 1619 as his Opus 2. It comprises 26 individual settings, which were assigned numbers 22 to 47 in the Schütz-Werke-Verzeichnis (SWV). Most of them use the text of a complete psalm in the translation by Martin Luther.

The full title of the publication, "Psalmen Davids / sampt / Etlichen Moteten und Concerten / mit acht und mehr Stimmen / Nebenst andern zweyen Capellen daß dero etliche / auff drey und vier Chor nach beliebung gebraucht / werden können", indicates that some motets and concertos are added to the psalm settings, and the scoring is for eight and more voices and two groups of instrumentalists, so that in some pieces three and even four choirs can participate in polychoral settings.

== History ==
In 1619, Schütz took up his office as Hofkapellmeister at the court of the Elector of Saxony, Johann Georg I., in Dresden, succeeding Rogier Michael. On 1 June, he married Magdalena, the daughter of Christian Wildeck, a court official. Planned well, the Psalmen Davids appeared the same day, dedicated to the Elector.

Schütz mentions in the introduction: "daß er etzliche Teutsche Psalmen auf Italienische Manier komponiert habe, zu welcher [er] von [seinem] lieben und in aller Welt hochberühmten Praeceptore Herrn Johan Gabrieln / ... / mit fleiß angeführet worden ... war" (that he composed several German psalms in Italian manner, to which he was induced intensely by his dear preceptor Giovanni Gabrieli, highly famous in all the world).

== Collection ==
Schütz chose 20 psalms, two of which he set twice, and added movements based on a hymn, the first stanza of Johann Gramann's "Nun lob, mein Seel, den Herren", and on texts from the prophets Isaiah and Jeremiah. Most, but not all, psalms end with the doxology (in the table short: dox), "Ehre sei dem Vater" (Glory be to the Father). Translations of SWV 24, 25, 27, 28, 30, 33, 36, 37, 39 and 40 are provided by Emmanuel Music

No.	SWV	Psalm no.	Title	English	Source (and notes)
1	SWV 22	110	Der Herr sprach zu meinem Herren	The Lord said unto my Lord	Psalm 110
2	SWV 23	2	Warum toben die Heiden	Why do the heathen rage	Psalm 2
3	SWV 24	6	Ach, Herr, straf mich nicht	Ah, Lord, do not punish me	Psalm 3 + dox
4	SWV 25	130	Aus der Tiefe	Out of the depths	Psalm 130 + dox
5	SWV 26	122	Ich freu mich des Herrn	I was glad when they said unto me	Psalm 122
6	SWV 27	8	Herr, unser Herrscher	Lord, our Ruler	Psalm 8 + dox
7	SWV 28	1	Wohl dem, der nicht wandelt	He is fortunate who does not walk	Psalm 1 + dox
8	SWV 29	84	Wie lieblich sind deine Wohnungen	How amiable are thy tabernacles	Psalm 84
9	SWV 30	128	Wohl dem, der den Herren fürchtet	He is fortunate who fears the Lord	Psalm 128 + dox
10	SWV 31	121	Ich hebe meine Augen auf	I will lift up mine eyes unto the hills	Psalm 121
11	SWV 32	136	Danket dem Herren, denn er ist freundlich	O give thanks unto the Lord; for he is good	Psalm 136
12	SWV 33	23	Der Herr ist mein Hirt	The Lord is my Shepherd	Psalm 23, no dox
13	SWV 34	111	Ich danke dem Herrn	Praise ye the LORD	Psalm 111
14	SWV 35	98	Singet dem Herrn ein neues Lied	O sing unto the LORD a new song	Psalm 98
15	SWV 36	100	Jauchzet dem Herren, alle Welt	Exult in the Lord, entire world	Psalm 100
16	SWV 37	137	An den Wassern zu Babel	By the rivers of Babylon	Psalm 137 + dox
17	SWV 38	150	Alleluja! Lobet den Herrenl	Praise ye the Lord	Psalm 150
18	SWV 39	103	Lobe den Herren, meine Seele	Bless the Lord, my soul	Psalms 103:2–4, concerto
19	SWV 40		Ist nicht Ephraim mein teurer Sohn	Is not Ephraim my beloved son	Jeremiah 31:20, motet
20	SWV 41		Nun lob, mein Seel, den Herren	Now praise, my soul, the Lord	hymn, canzona
21	SWV 42	126	Die mit Tränen säen	They that sow in tears	Psalms 126:5–6, motet
22	SWV 43	115	Nicht uns, Herr	Not unto us, O Lord	Psalm 115
23	SWV 44	128	Wohl dem, der den Herren fürchtet	Blessed is every one that feareth the LORD	Psalm 128
24	SWV 45	136	Danket dem Herren, denn er ist freundlich	O give thanks unto the Lord; for he is good	Psalm 136
25	SWV 46		Zion spricht, der Herr hat mich verlassen	Not unto us, O Lord	Isaiah 49:14–16, concerto
26	SWV 47	100	Jauchzet dem Herren, alle Welt	Make a joyful noise unto the Lord, all ye lands	Psalm 98:4-6; Psalm 150:4; Psalm 96:11; Psalm 117, concerto

== Reception ==
A reviewer from Gramophone wrote that Psalmen Davids "ranks among [Schütz's] most sumptuous and spectacular achievements". Fabrice Fitch referred to it as the composer's "first monumental publication of sacred music", agreeing with Peter Wollny's comment on "its variety in the treatment of a medium whose potential for cliche is, after all, very great".

== Publication and recordings ==
The Psalmen Davids is part of the complete edition of the composer's works by Carus-Verlag, begun in 1992 as the Stuttgart Schütz Edition and planned to be completed by 2017. The edition uses the Heinrich-Schütz-Archiv of the Hochschule für Musik Dresden. They were recorded, as part of the complete recordings of works by Schütz, by the Dresdner Kammerchor and organist Ludger Rémy, conducted by Hans-Christoph Rademann. Soloists are sopranos Dorothee Mields and Marie Luise Werneburg, altos David Erler and Stefan Kunath, tenors Georg Poplutz and Tobias Mäthger, and basses Stephan MacLeod and Felix Schwandtke. A review notes the accent on a contrast, as the composer intended, between the soloists (favoriti) and the choir (ripieno):

These soloists, the so-called 'favoriti' are given the responsibility of bringing illustrative power to their sung lines, to sing 'as well and as sweetly' as possible. These solo singers are vested with the conveyance of the texts’ imagery in all its power and immediacy, whilst the ripieno choruses have a different function, which is, in the composer's words, 'for a strong sound and for splendour'.
