= Elze =

- Town
- Coat of arms

- Location of Elze within Hildesheim district
- Interactive map of Elze
- Location within Germany Location within Lower Saxony
- Coordinates: 52°7′N 09°44′E
- Country: Germany
- State: Lower Saxony
- District: Hildesheim

Government
  - Mayor (2020–25): Wolfgang Schurmann (CDU)

Area
  - Total: 47.81 km^{2} (18.46 sq mi)
- Elevation: 79 m (259 ft)

Population (2025-12-31)
  - Total: 8,777
  - Density: 183.6/km^{2} (475.5/sq mi)
- Time zone: UTC+01:00 (CET)
  - Summer (DST): UTC+02:00 (CEST)
- Postal codes: 31008
- Dialling codes: 05068
- Vehicle registration: HI
- Website: www.elze.de

Elze (German pronunciation: [ˈɛltsə]) is a town in the district of Hildesheim, in Lower Saxony, Germany. It is situated on the river Leine, approximately 15 km (9.3 mi) west of Hildesheim. The municipality of Elze also comprises the villages of Esbeck, Mehle, Sehlde, Sorsum, Wittenburg and Wülfingen.

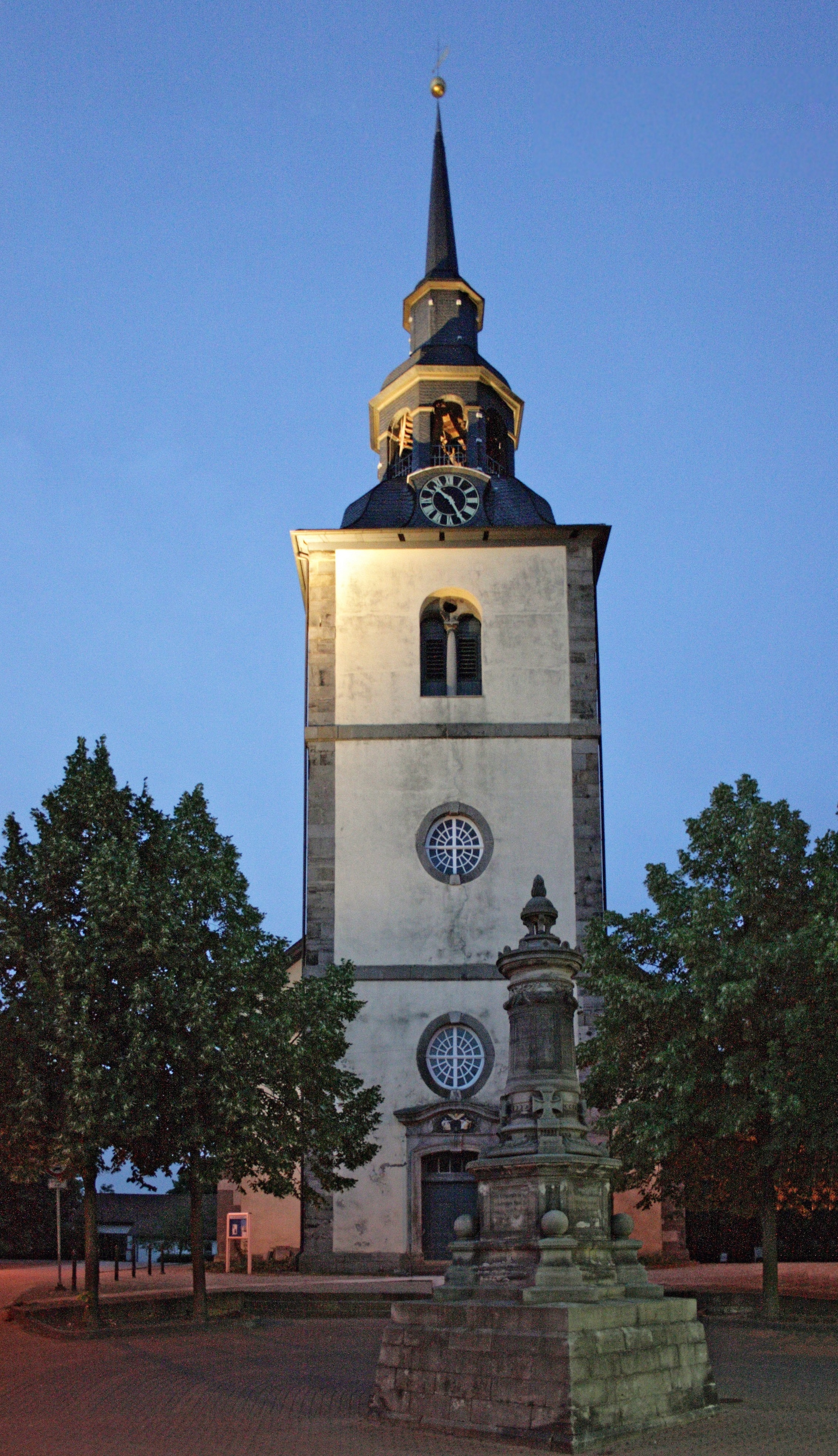
St Peter and Paul

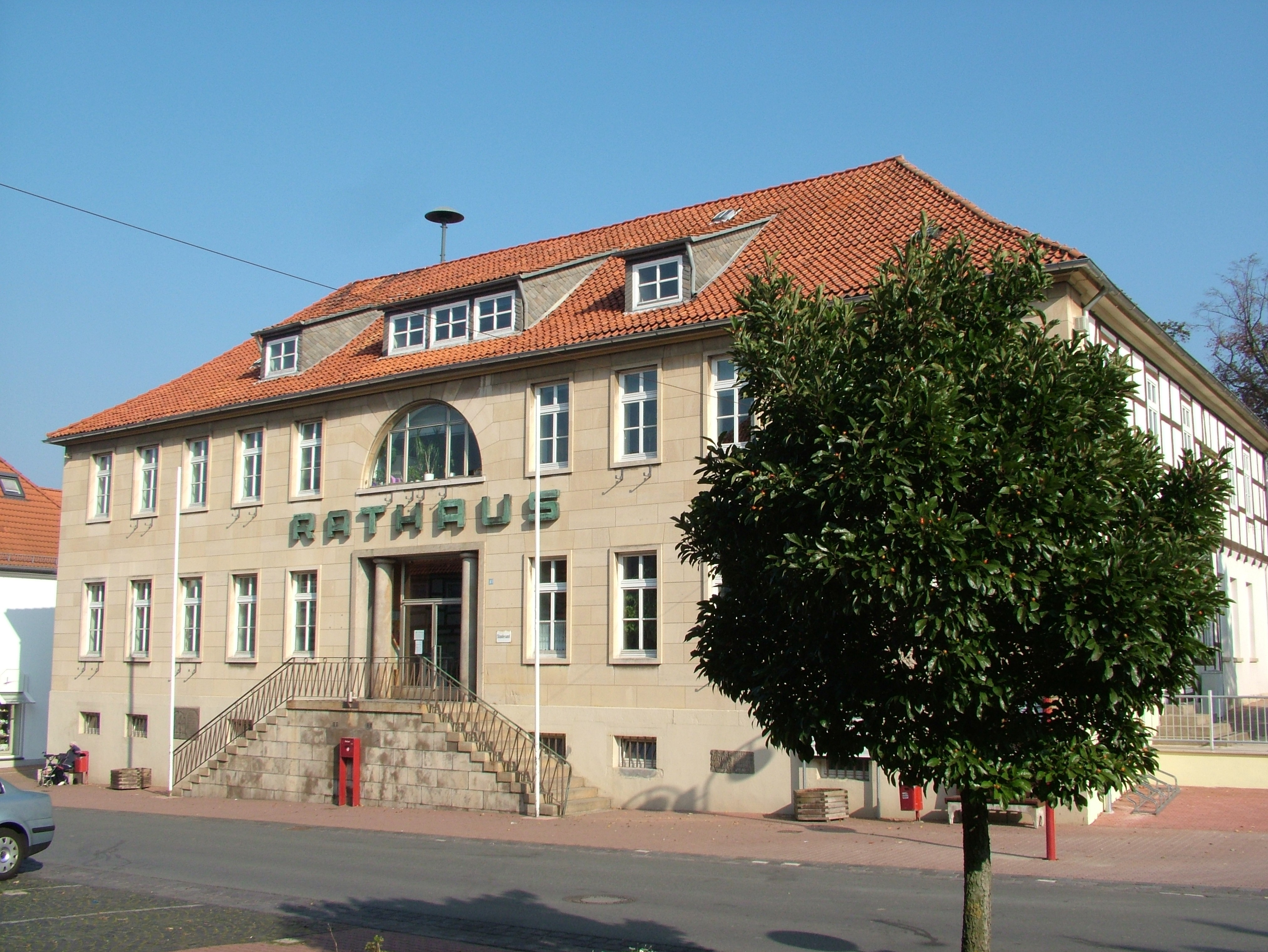
Town hall

Elze is one of the oldest settlement in the area, as its name stems from Latin: aula caesaris, a castle of Charlemagne which he had established about 800 in the Saxon estates after his victory over duke Widukind in the Saxon Wars. The emperor also founded a missionary diocese here, dedicated to Saints Peter and Paul which became the origin of the Bishopric of Hildesheim. King Louis the Pious relocated the episcopal see to Hildesheim in 815, however the Lutheran parish church is still devoted to Peter and Paul and the saints are also depicted in the town's coat of arms.

The village of Wittenburg is the site of a former Augustininan canons regular monastery, established in the 14th century in the place of a former castle, maybe erected by members of the Billung dynasty as early as 805. The abbey decayed in the course of the Protestant Reformation, while the Gothic monastery church is preserved.

In 1856 the Kingdom of Hanover opened the Hanoverian Southern Railway (Hannöversche Südbahn) from Hanover to Kassel with a station in Elze. After the annexation by Prussia in 1866, the town became an important railway junction with the building of the Elze–Löhne railway (Weserbahn) to Löhne in Westphalia by entrepreneur Bethel Henry Strousberg, finished in 1875. Elze is also the junction of the Bundesstraße 1 and Bundesstraße 3 federal highways.

== Notable people ==
- Justus Gesenius (1601-1673), Lutheran theologian
- Johann Heinrich Louis Krüger (1857-1923), mathematician
- Philipp Furtwängler, (1800-1867), organ builder,
- Philipp Furtwängler, (1869-1940), mathematician (number theorist)
- Günter Halm, (born 1922), bearer of the Knight's Cross and Order of Merit of the Federal Republic of Germany

== Twin town ==
- Écouché, France since 1971.
