= Du sollt Gott, deinen Herren, lieben, BWV 77 =

Church cantata by Johann Sebastian Bach

Du sollt Gott, deinen Herren, lieben
- BWV 77
- Church cantata by J. S. Bach
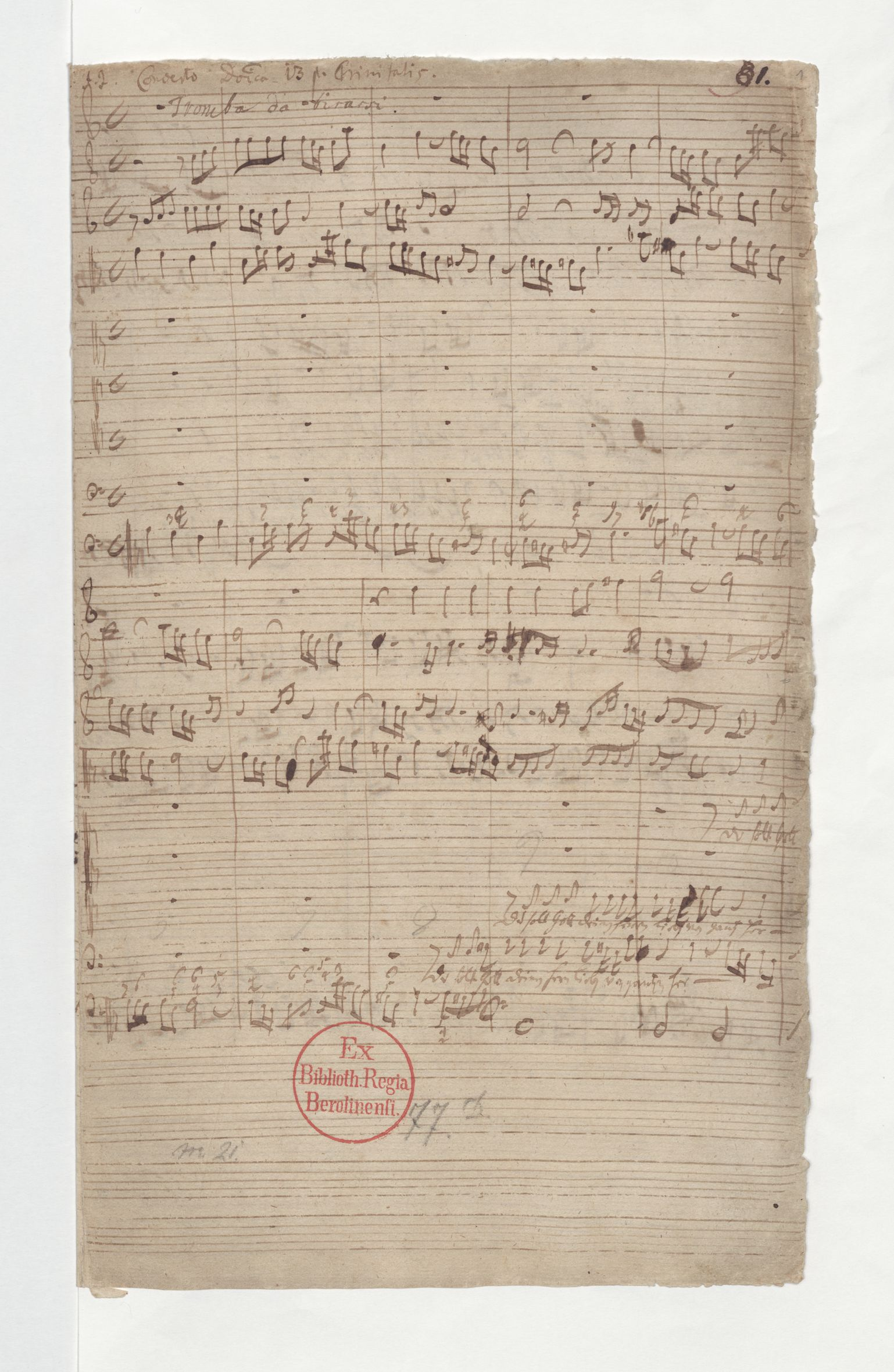
- Autograph manuscript of the opening chorus
- Occasion: 13th Sunday after Trinity
- Cantata text: Johann Oswald Knauer (mvts. 2–5); David Denicke (mvt. 6)
- Bible text: Luke 10:27 (mvt. 1)
- Chorale: (tunes only): Martin Luther (mvt. 1); Erfurt 1524 (mvt. 6)
- Performed: 22 August 1723: Leipzig
- Movements: six
- Vocal: SATB choir and solo
- Instrumental: tromba da tirarsi; 2 oboes; bassoon; 2 violins; viola; continuo

Johann Sebastian Bach composed the church cantata Du sollt Gott, deinen Herren, lieben (Note: Sic; W. Rust's BGA edition gives the standard "sollst" in place of Luther's 1522 "sollt" or 1545 "solt".) (You shall love God, your Lord), BWV 77 in Leipzig for the thirteenth Sunday after Trinity and first performed it on 22 August 1723.

Bach composed the cantata in his first year as Thomaskantor in Leipzig, where he had begun a first cantata cycle for the occasions of the liturgical year on the first Sunday after Trinity with Die Elenden sollen essen, BWV 75. The cantata text, written by Johann Oswald Knauer, is focused on the prescribed reading for the Sunday, the parable of the Good Samaritan containing the Great Commandment, which is used as the text of the first movement. A pair of recitative and aria deals with the love of God, while a symmetrical pair deals with the love of the neighbour. Bach did not write the text of the closing chorale in the score, but probably his son Johann Christoph Friedrich Bach.

Bach scored the cantata for four vocal soloists, mixed choir, tromba da tirarsi, two oboes, strings and continuo. In the first movement Bach uses an instrumental quotation of Luther's hymn on the Ten Commandments, "Dies sind die heilgen zehn Gebot" (These are the holy ten commandments), played by the trumpet in canon with the continuo.

== History and words ==
Bach wrote the cantata in 1723 in his first year as Thomaskantor in Leipzig for the 13th Sunday after Trinity. The prescribed readings for the Sunday were from the Epistle to the Galatians, Paul's teaching on law and promise (Galatians 3:15–22), and from the Gospel of Luke, the parable of the Good Samaritan (Luke 10:23–37). The cantata text was written by Johann Oswald Knauer and appeared in Gotha in 1720 in Gott-geheiligtes Singen und Spielen (Holy singing and playing to God). The text relates closely to the readings, even to the situation in which the parable was told, referring to the question of a lawyer what needs to be done to achieve eternal life. The answer, which the lawyer had to give himself, was the commandment to love God and your neighbour. This, the Great Commandment, is the text of the first movement. Accordingly, the following text is divided in two parts, one recitative and aria dealing with the love of God, and a symmetrical part handling the love of the neighbour.

The cantata's last movement is a four-part harmonisation of the "Ach Gott, vom Himmel sieh darein" hymn tune: this tune, Zahn No. 4431, was first published in Erfurt in 1524 and is based on a pre–Reformation model. Bach did not write any lyrics for this movement in his autograph score. A later hand added the text of the eighth stanza of David Denicke's hymn "Wenn einer alle Ding verstünd" (1657). Wilhelm Rust, who edited the cantata for the 19th-century Bach-Gesellschaft Ausgabe (BGA), considered this text as chosen by Karl Friedrich Zelter, but included it nonetheless in the published score. Werner Neumann did not think that the text of the concluding chorale was well-chosen, so for his presentation of the cantata in the 20th-century New Bach Edition (Neue Bach-Ausgabe, NBA) he replaced it by a stanza from Denicke's "O Gottes Sohn, Herr Jesu Christ" hymn (1657). In an article published in the 2001 volume of the Bach-Jahrbuch, Peter Wollny wrote that the handwriting of the last movement's lyrics in Bach's autograph was not Zelter's but probably that of Johann Christoph Friedrich, one of Bach's younger sons, who may have had access to the cantata's performing parts containing the lyrics as intended by the composer.

Bach led the Thomanerchor in the first performance of the cantata on 22 August 1723.

== Music ==
=== Structure and scoring ===
Bach structured the cantata in six movements with choral movements framing two pairs of recitative and aria. He scored it for four vocal soloists (soprano (S), alto (A), tenor (T) and bass (B)), a SATB mixed choir, and an orchestra of tromba da tirarsi (Baroque slide trumpet) (tir), two oboes (Ob), two violins (Vl), viola (Va), and basso continuo (Bc) including bassoon (Fg). The title of the autograph score reads "J.J. Concerto Dominica 13 p- Trinitatis" (J.J. concerto for the 13th a. Trinity, J.J. being short for Jesu juva (Jesus help).

The data in the table below, such as keys and time signatures, derive from the BGA and NBA editions, and scholarship by Alfred Dürr and others. Winds and string instruments are shown in separate columns, leaving the continuo, which is playing throughout, unmentioned.

Movements of Du sollt Gott, deinen Herren, lieben
No.	Title	Text	Type	Vocal	Winds	Strings	Key	Time
1	Du sollt Gott, deinen Herren, lieben	Luke 10:27	Chorus	SATB	Tir	2Vl Va	C major	common time
2	So muß es sein!	Knauer	Recitative	B				common time
3	Mein Gott, ich liebe dich von Herzen	Knauer	Aria	S	2Ob		A minor	common time
4	Gib mir dabei, mein Gott! ein Samariterherz	Knauer	Recitative	T		2Vl Va	D minor	common time
5	Ach, es bleibt in meiner Liebe	Knauer	Aria	A	Tir			3/4
6	(setting of the "Ach Gott, vom Himmel sieh darein" hymn tune)	Denicke	Chorale	SATB	unknown	2Vl Va	G minor – D major	common time

=== Movements ===
==== 1 ====
The first movement, "Du sollt Gott, deinen Herren, lieben" (You shall love God, your Lord), carries Bach's statement on the most important law, on which, according to the parallel Matthew 22:34–40, "hang all the law and the prophets". The words translate to "You shall love God, your Lord, with all your heart, with all your soul, with all your strength and with all your mind, and your neighbor as yourself". Bach had enlarged on the "dualism of love of God and brotherly love" already in his monumental cantata in 14 movements, Die Himmel erzählen die Ehre Gottes, BWV 76, at the beginning of his first cycle. In order to show the law's universality, Bach introduces Martin Luther's chorale "Dies sind die heilgen Zehn Gebot" (These are the holy ten commandments), referring to the commandments of the Old Testament, as a foundation of the movement's structure. The tune is played in a strict canon, the most rigid musical law as one more symbol. The canon is performed by the trumpet in the highest range, and the continuo, representing the lowest range. The tempo of the trumpet is twice as fast as the tempo of the continuo, therefore the trumpet has time to repeat first single lines and finally the complete melody of the chorale. The trumpet enters ten times, to symbolize once more the completeness of the law. The voices, representing the law of the New Testament, engage in imitation of a theme which is derived from the chorale tune and first played by the instruments. John Eliot Gardiner, who provides an extended analysis of the movement, concludes:

The end result is a potent mixture of modal and diatonic harmonies, one which leaves an unforgettable impression in the mind's ear, and in context propels one forward to the world of Brahms' German Requiem and beyond, to Messiaen's Quartet for the End of Time.

==== 2 ====
A short secco recitative for bass, "So muß es sein!" (So it must be! ), summarizes the ideas.

==== 3 ====
An aria for soprano, "Mein Gott, ich liebe dich von Herzen" (My God, I love You from my heart), is accompanied by two obbligato oboes which frequently play in tender third parallels.

==== 4 ====
The second recitative for tenor, "Gib mir dabei, mein Gott! ein Samariterherz" (Give me as well, my God! a Samaritan heart), is a prayer to grant a heart like the Samaritan's. It is intensified by the strings.

==== 5 ====
The last aria for alto with an obbligato trumpet, "Ach, es bleibt in meiner Liebe" (Ah, in my love there is still ), takes the form of a sarabande. Bach conveys the "Unvollkommenheit" (imperfection) of human attempt to live by the law of love, by choosing the trumpet and composing for it "awkward intervals" and "wildly unstable notes" which would sound imperfect on the period's valveless instruments. In contrast, Bach wrote in the middle section a long trumpet solo of "ineffable beauty", as a "glorious glimpse of God's realm".

==== 6 ====
The closing four-part chorale is a setting of the "Ach Gott, vom Himmel sieh darein" hymn tune. The cantata has been published with two variant versions of the chorale text:

- The BGA edition publishes the lyrics which another hand added to Bach's autograph, i.e. a stanza from Denicke's "Wenn einer alle Ding verstünd" with the incipit "Du stellst, Herr Jesu, selber dich zum Vorbild deiner Liebe" (You, Lord Jesus, stand as a model of your love).
- The NBA publishes the lyrics according to its editor's suggestion: the stanza "Herr, durch den Glauben wohn in mir" (Lord, dwell in me through faith) from Denicke's "O Gottes Sohn, Herr Jesu Christ".

== Recordings ==
The entries of the table are taken from the listing on the Bach Cantatas Website. Ensembles playing period instruments in historically informed performance are marked by green background.

Recordings of Du sollt Gott, deinen Herren, lieben
Title	Conductor / Choir / Orchestra	Soloists	Label	Year	Orch. type
J. S. Bach: Das Kantatenwerk • Complete Cantatas • Les Cantates, Folge / Vol. 4	Gustav Leonhardt: Knabenchor Hannover; Collegium Vocale Gent; Leonhardt-Consort	soloists of the Knabenchor Hannover; Paul Esswood; Adalbert Kraus; Max van Egmond	Teldec	1978	Period
Die Bach Kantate Vol. 47	Helmuth Rilling Gächinger Kantorei Württembergisches Kammerorchester Heilbronn	Helen Donath; Helen Watts; Adalbert Kraus; Wolfgang Schöne	Hänssler	1983	Chamber
J. S. Bach: Complete Cantatas Vol. 8	Ton Koopman Amsterdam Baroque Orchestra & Choir	Dorothea Röschmann; Elisabeth von Magnus; Jörg Dürmüller; Klaus Mertens	Antoine Marchand	1998	Period
Bach Cantatas Vol. 6: Köthen/Frankfurt / For the 12th Sunday after Trinity / For the 13th Sunday after Trinity	John Eliot Gardiner Monteverdi Choir English Baroque Soloists	Gillian Keith; Nathalie Stutzmann; Christoph Genz; Jonathan Brown	Soli Deo Gloria	2000	Period
J.S. Bach: Cantatas Vol. 13 – Cantatas from Leipzig 1723	Masaaki Suzuki Bach Collegium Japan	Yoshie Hida; Kirsten Sollek-Avella; Makoto Sakurada; Peter Kooy	BIS	1999	Period
Bach Edition Vol. 21 – Cantatas Vol. 12	Pieter Jan Leusink Holland Boys Choir Netherlands Bach Collegium	Ruth Holton; Sytse Buwalda; Nico van der Meel; Bas Ramselaar	Brilliant Classics	2000	Period
