= Günter Halm =

German officer, recipient of the Knight's Cross (1922–2017)

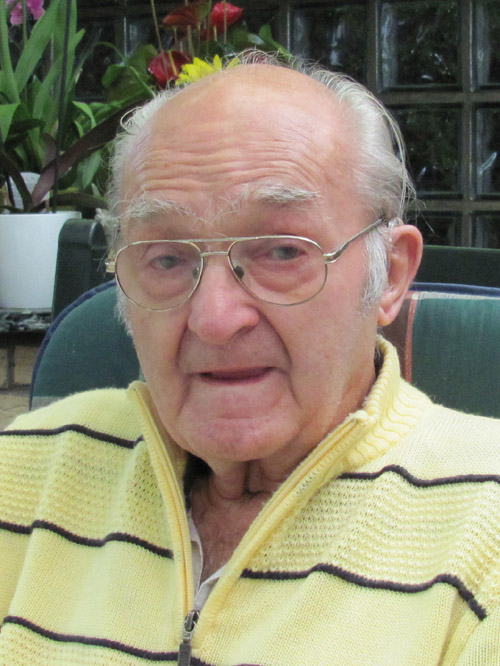
- Günter Halm in 2011
- Born: 27 August 1922; Elze, Germany
- Died: 26 September 2017 (aged 95); Bad Münder, Germany
- Military career
- Allegiance: Nazi Germany
- Branch: Heer
- Service years: 1941–45
- Rank: Leutnant
- Unit: 21. Panzer Division
- Awards: Knight's Cross of the Iron Cross; Iron Cross 1st Class; Iron Cross 2nd Class

Günter Halm (27 August 1922 – 26 September 2017) was a German infantryman and the youngest member of the Afrika Korps to be awarded the Knight's Cross for his bravery in action.

== Early life ==
Halm was born on 27 August 1922 in the town of Elze, Lower Saxony, to Heinrich and Friederike Halm. On attending his local school in Braunschweig, he completed his studies, two of which were dedicated to his vocation as a machinist. At the end of 1941 he was called up for military service, where he completed his basic training and served with the Panzerjäger-Ersatzabteilung 13 in Braunschweig. In 1942 he was posted to the Afrika Korps where he was employed as a gunner with support company’s anti-tank platoon of Panzergrenadier-Regiments 104, 21. Panzer-Division.

== Military service ==
=== North Africa ===
The anti-tank platoon consisted of two captured Soviet anti-tank guns, both being 76mm M1936s (F22), which the Wehrmacht designated as the PAK 36 or PAK 36(r), and were colloquially known at the ‘Ratsch-Bumm’. With Halm's gun under the command of Unteroffizier Jabeck, his unit took part in Operation Theseus, also known as the Battle of Gazala. In July 1942 he was promoted to Gefreiter and on 15 July 1942 he was awarded the Iron Cross 2nd Class for the elimination of two British tanks at the Battle of Bir Hakeim.

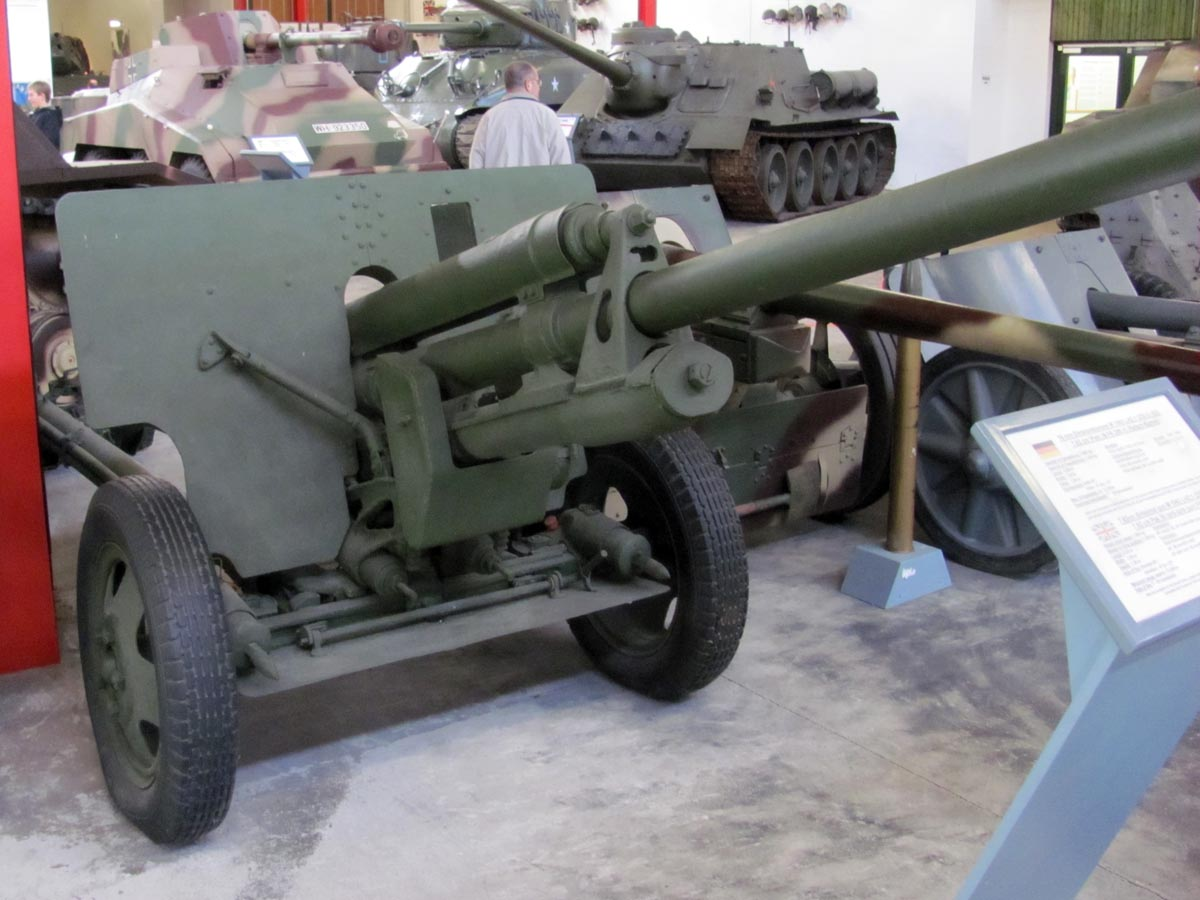
7,62 cm - PAK - 36 FK 296 r anti-tank gun, in German called Ratsch Bumm

Following this he fought at the First Battle of El Alamein, where he, despite the fact that his gun had taken a direct hit which had wounded two of the crew, successfully destroyed 15 tanks of the British 23rd Armoured Brigade at Ruweisat Ridge on 22 July 1942. For this achievement he was awarded the Iron Cross 1st Class. As his efforts had essentially blunted the British counter-attack in a matter of minutes, however, it was suggested that he ought indeed to have received the Knight's Cross and, with the application having been approved, he was awarded Germany’s highest award for bravery at the age of 19 on 7 August 1942 by General Field Marshal Erwin Rommel himself.

His promotion to Unteroffizier soon followed in November 1942, before being wounded twice; the first being in December 1942 and then again March 1943. Having been hospitalised in Athens and Vienna, he became a Fahnenjunker in July 1943 and a month later successfully completed the Fallschirmjäger course at Wischau. In October 1943 he was promoted to Feldwebel and in November 1943 to Oberfähnrich.

=== Normandy ===
Between December 1943 and the end of February 1944 he undertook officer training in Berlin and on completion was subsequently promoted to Leutnant. In March 1944 he deployed to France where he held the position of ordnance officer with the Panzergrenadier-Regiment 192 of the 21. Panzer-Division. During heavy fighting at the Battle of the Falaise Pocket he was captured by Allied troops in August 1944 and shipped to a POW camp in the United States.

== Post-war ==
On his release in 1946 he returned to Germany, where he and his wife ran her parents’ fuel business for the next 42 years until their retirement. Halm joined the local gymnastics and sports club in Bad Münder and later became its chairman, a position which he held from 1973 until 1993. Out of respect, the club made him honorary chairman after his 20-year tenure. He was also regional chairman of the Volksbundes Deutsche Kriegsgräberfürsorge, a nationwide organisation caring for war graves, a member of the supervisory board of the Volksbank in Bad Münder and a member of the local Schützenverein.

For his numerous social commitments he received a golden badge of honour from Lower Saxony's Sports Association, a letter of commendation from the German Gymnastics Association, Bad Münder's silver medal and in 1995 the Federal Cross of Merit. On 12 May 2004 at the Julius-Leber-Kaserne in Berlin, the Bundeswehr Camaraderie of Reservists 14 took on his name in honour. Working in conjunction with Paul Carell, Halm published his biography in 2012: Ein Grenadier entscheidet eine Schlacht. Die Erinnerungen von Günter Halm, dem jüngsten Ritterkreuzträger des Afrikakorps, (A Gunner Resolves A Battle, the memories of Günter Halm, youngest bearer of the Africa Corps' Knight's Cross ).

Halm died in September 2017 at the age of 95.

== Awards ==
- Iron Cross (1939) 2nd class & 1st class (29 July 1942)
- Knight's Cross of the Iron Cross on 29 July 1942 as Grenadier and gunner in the Pakzug (anti tank platoon) in the Stabskompanie/Panzergrenadier-Regiment 104

== See also ==
- List of Knight's Cross of the Iron Cross recipients (Ha–Hm)
