= Old 100th =

Hymn tune

- by Louis Bourgeois
- Genre: Hymn
- Written: 1551
- Meter: 8.8.8.8 (L.M.)
- The Old 100th psalm tune An audio example of the tune

"Old Hundredth" (also known as "Old Hundred") is a hymn tune in long metre, from the second edition of the Genevan Psalter. It is one of the best known melodies in many occidental Christian musical traditions. The tune is usually attributed to the French composer Louis Bourgeois (c. 1510 – c. 1560).

Although the tune was first associated with Psalm 134 in the Genevan Psalter, the melody receives its current name from an association with the 100th Psalm, in a translation by William Kethe titled "All People that on Earth do Dwell". The melody is also sung to various other lyrics, including the Common Doxology ("Praise God From Whom All Blessings Flow") and various German Lutheran chorales. In that latter respect it was used by Johann Sebastian Bach as a cantus firmus in his chorale cantata Herr Gott, dich loben alle wir (BWV 130).

== Background ==
The Genevan Psalter was compiled over a number of years in the Swiss city of Geneva, a center of Protestant activity during the Reformation, in response to the teaching of John Calvin that communal singing of psalms in the vernacular language is a foundational aspect of church life. This contrasted with the prevailing Catholic practice at the time in which sacred texts were chanted in Latin by the clergy only. Calvinist musicians including Bourgeois supplied many new melodies and adapted others from sources both sacred and secular. The final version of this psalter was completed in 1562. Calvin intended the melodies to be sung in plainsong during church services, but harmonized versions were provided for singing at home.

== Lyrics ==
The original lyrics set to this tune in the Genevan Psalter are a paraphrase of Psalm 134:

Or, in English translation:

You faithful servants of the Lord,
sing out his praise with one accord,
while serving him with all your might
and keeping vigil through the night.

Unto his house lift up your hand
and to the Lord your praises send.
May God who made the earth and sky
bestow his blessings from on high.

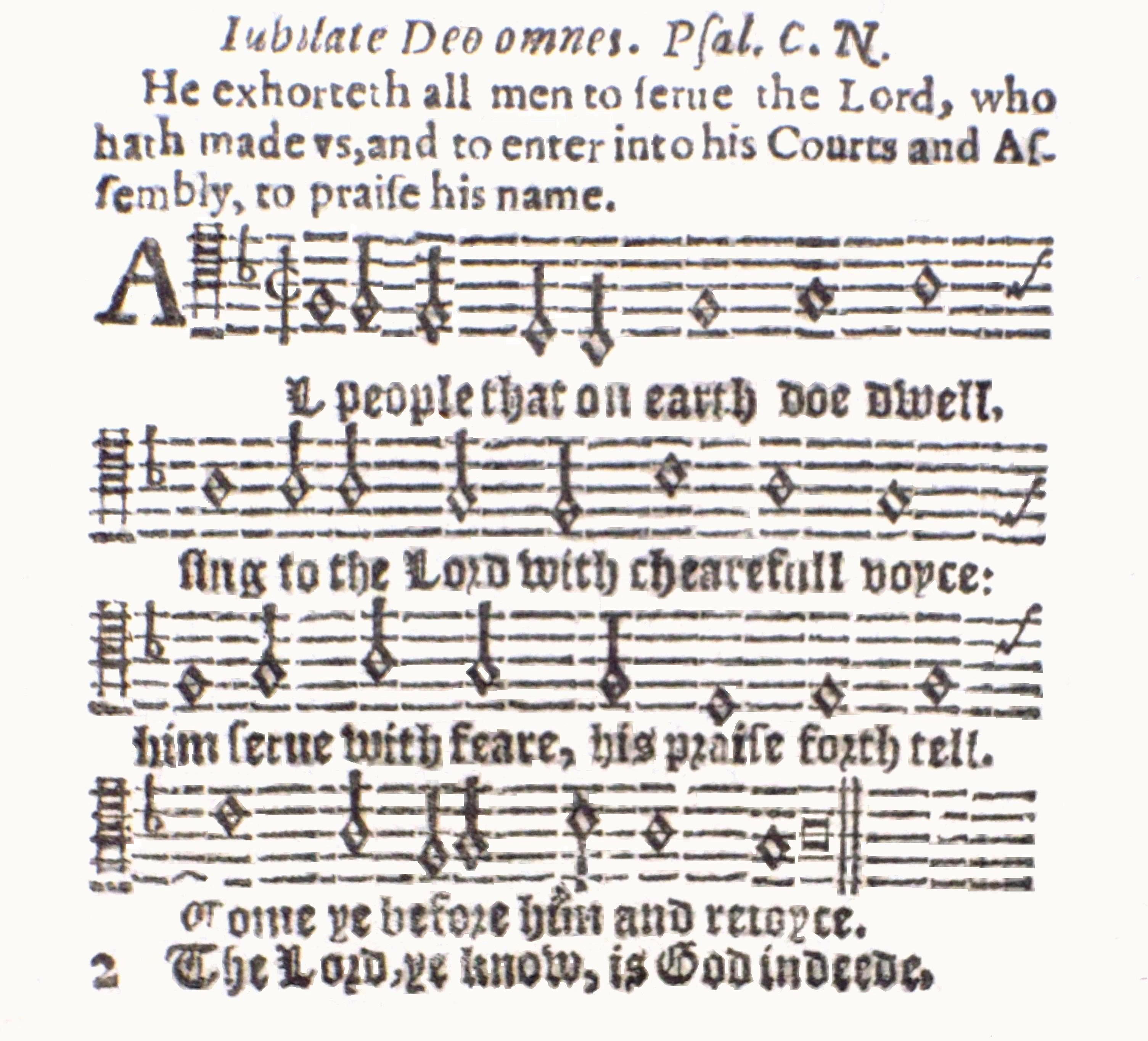
The Old Hundredth metrical setting from a 1628 printing of the Sternhold and Hopkins Psalter.

Old 100th is commonly used to sing the lyrics that begin "All People That on Earth Do Dwell," Psalm 100, a version that originated in the Anglo-Genevan Psalter (1561) and is attributed to the Scottish clergyman William Kethe. Kethe was in exile at Geneva at this time, as the Scottish Reformation was only just beginning. The first verse is as follows:

All people that on earth do dwell,
Sing to the Lord with cheerful voice;
Him serve with mirth, His praise forth tell;
Come ye before Him and rejoice.

This version was sung at the coronation of Queen Elizabeth II in 1953, with harmonization and arrangement by the composer Ralph Vaughan Williams.

A hymn commonly sung to Old 100th is "Praise God, from Whom All Blessings Flow," using the text often referred to as the Doxology, written in 1674 by Thomas Ken, a bishop in the Church of England. This hymn was originally the final verse of a longer hymn entitled "Awake, My Soul, and With the Sun," though it is most commonly sung by itself as a doxology. The traditional text is:

Praise God, from Whom all blessings flow;
Praise Him, all creatures here below;
Praise Him above, ye heavenly host;
Praise Father, Son, and Holy Ghost.

In the United States, this version is particularly emblematic of Mainline Protestant churches, and often evokes nostalgia among churchgoers. Different versions of that text are also widely used, including nontrinitarian and gender neutral variations.

The melody can be used for any hymn text in long meter, that is, with four lines of eight syllables in iambic feet. The hymn From all that dwell below the skies, a paraphrasing of Psalm 117 by Isaac Watts with the Doxology as the final verse, is commonly sung to the tune. In the Sacred Harp and other shape note singing traditions, the tune is sung with the text "O Come, Loud Anthems Let Us Sing," a metrical paraphrase of Psalm 95 from Tate and Brady's A New Version of the Psalms of David. The popular Hawaiian version Hoʻonani i ka Makua mau was translated by Hiram Bingham I and is published in hymnals.

== Tune ==
The tune first appeared in the Genevan Psalter, coupled with French metrical text for Psalm 134. Over the years, the tune was sometimes rhythmically modified. Below it is as set by Johann Sebastian Bach in the final movement of his cantata Herr Gott, dich loben alle wir (BWV 130).

== In other works ==
- Voluntary on the Old Hundredth – also called The 100th Psalm tune. Set as a Lesson. This is an organ piece using the psalm tune as a theme, not unlike a chorale prelude, and was meant for church use. Authorship is somewhat dubious, the piece was either written by John Blow or his student Henry Purcell.
- "Herr Gott, dich loben alle wir", a hymn in twelve stanzas by Paul Eber after Philipp Melanchthon's "Dicimus grates tibi", for Michaelmas, is sung to the same tune (Zahn No. 368). Johann Sebastian Bach harmonized this hymn in the chorale cantata BWV 130, and in the four-part chorales BWV 326 and BWV 327.
- Hubert Parry – Three Chorale Fantasias is based on the Old 100th.
- Virgil Thomson – quoted in several movements of his score for The Plow that Broke the Plains (1936).
- Paul Hindemith – quoted in his Trauermusik (January 1936).
- Benjamin Britten – 1948 cantata St Nicolas
- David Maslanka – Symphony No. 4
- Frank Ticheli – Angels in the Architecture
- Coleridge-Taylor Perkinson -- Worship: A Concert Orchestra (2001)
- Claude T. Smith – Variations on a Hymn by Louis Bourgeois
- Felix Mendelssohn – Piano Trio in C minor Op 66, 4th movement Finale
- Ralph Vaughan Williams – The Old 100th Psalm Tune ("All people that on earth do dwell") – originally composed for the 1953 coronation of Queen Elizabeth II; with a brass fanfare and borrowing a 1621 setting by John Dowland.
- The 1893 song "The Volunteer Organist" by George L. Spaulding features the Old Hundredth in its refrain - it is played by the piano and is harmonised to an original vocal melody.
- In The Adventures of Tom Sawyer by Mark Twain, the congregation sings "Old Hundredth" (called "Old Hundred" here) to celebrate the reappearance of Tom Sawyer, Huck Finn and Joe Harper at the funeral service being held for them after they had gone missing and were presumed dead.

"Old Hundred" was the first work transmitted by telephone during Graham Bell's first demo at the American Academy of Arts and Sciences (Boston, May 10, 1876).

== See also ==
- Metrical psalter
