= The Volunteer Organist =

Song by William B. Gray and George L. Spaulding

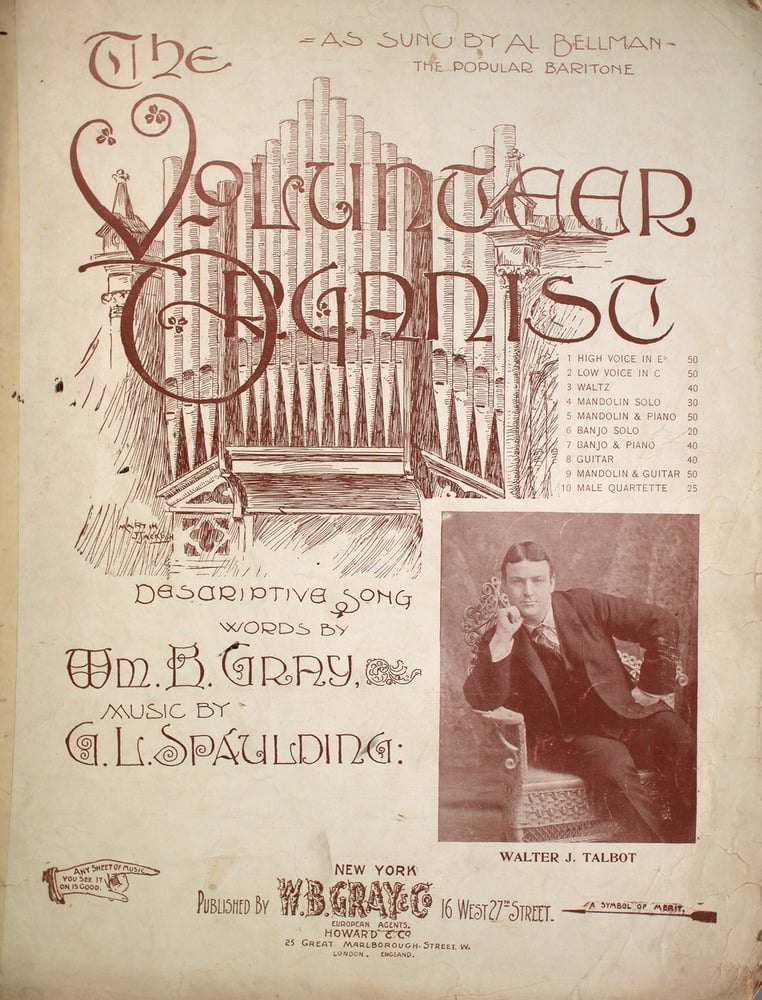
- 1893 sheet music cover

Song
- Published: 1893
- Genre: Christian ballad
- Songwriters: William B. Gray; George L. Spaulding

"The Volunteer Organist" is a Christian music ballad written by William B. Gray and George L. Spaulding. It was initially published under the pseudonyms W. B. Glenroy and Henry Lamb.

== Content ==
The song tells the story of a Sunday church service. The preacher informs the congregation that their usual organist is ill, and asks for a volunteer to play. A ragged-looking man staggers to the organ. The congregation assumes he is drunk, but he plays a beautiful melody that is more moving than the preacher's sermon. When he finishes, the organist gets up and leaves, while the congregation sits in amazed silence until the preacher asks them to pray.

The song's refrain uses a musical passage from an older hymn, the Old Hundredth, contrasted with more modern elements typical of Tin Pan Alley songs.

== History ==
Gray's lyrics are based on an earlier folk tale. Poet Sam Walter Foss had published his own version of the story in 1889 in the Yankee Blade, a magazine he edited. The Foss poem was reprinted in a number of newspapers and in his book Back Country Poems, which was published in 1892.

Gray wrote the lyrics in 1892. Spaulding added the music, and it was first published in 1893. The song was very popular, selling hundreds of thousands of copies in its first decade.

== Adaptations ==
The song had variety of adaptations in other media. Gray used the story as the basis of a play in 1901. The play was first presented in Middletown, New York in April 1901, then toured North America. The expanded version of the story is set it in a village in Vermont. It focuses on the evils of drunkenness and is generally associated with the temperance movement.

Gray then used the script from the play as the basis for a novel, which was published by J. S. Ogilvie in 1902. A silent movie adaptation was released in 1913.
