= Jauchzet dem Herren, alle Welt, SWV 36 =

1614/5 choral composition by Heinrich Schütz

Jauchzet dem Herren, alle Welt
- by Heinrich Schütz
- Catalogue: SWV 36
- Genre: Sacred vocal music
- Text: Psalm 100
- Language: German
- Composed: 1614/15
- Dedication: Johann Georg I
- Published: 1 June 1619 in Dresden

Jauchzet dem Herren, alle Welt (Rejoice in the Lord, all ye lands), SWV 36, is a choral setting of Psalm 100 in German for double choir by Heinrich Schütz. It is one of the Psalmen Davids, published in 1619. The psalm setting has been performed and recorded internationally.

== History ==
Schütz studied the art of Venetian polychoral style in Venice with Giovanni Gabrieli. After his return to Germany, he first worked in Kassel, and then took up office in Dresden in 1619, as Hofkapellmeister at the court of the Elector of Saxony, Johann Georg I., succeeding Rogier Michael. On 1 June, he married Magdalena, the daughter of Christian Wildeck, a court official. Planned well, the collection Psalmen Davids, of polychoral psalm settings in German, appeared the same day, dedicated to the Elector. He set Psalm 100 four two four-part choirs, using echo effects. A manuscript of an early version of this psalm setting dates back to 1614/15.

== Publication ==
The psalm setting is part of the complete edition of the composer's works by Carus-Verlag, begun in 1992 as the Stuttgart Schütz Edition. The edition uses the Heinrich-Schütz-Archiv of the Hochschule für Musik Dresden. Jauchzet dem Herren, alle Welt has been published individually, for example by Bärenreiter, and by Carus in 1994, with an English version Praise the Almighty.

== Text and music ==
The text is Psalm 100 in the translation by Martin Luther with an added doxology. The music is set in G major, and begins in a triple metre. The first choir opens with a phrase of two measures, "Jauchzet dem Herren"; it is echoed by the second choir in the second measure, repeated by the first choir in the third measure, and echoed in the fourth.

For the phrase "alle Welt", the music is longer, and echoed only on the last note, without overlapping. The metre changes to common time for a repetition of the complete first line. This metre remains for most of the composition, but the metre and rhythm of the beginning return for the phrase "Danket ihm" (Thank him). A few single words are highlighted by vivid melismas, such as "Freuden" (joy) and "Loben" (praise). Melismas are more frequent in the doxology, for "Ehre" (Glory), "Heilgen Geiste" (Holy Spirit) and the often repeated Amen.

== Performance and recording ==
Jauchzet dem Herren, alle Welt was performed at the Proms in the Royal Albert Hall in 1972, in a concert of the Martindale Sidwell Choir and the Early Music Consort.

The Psalmen Davids were recorded in 1971 by the Regensburger Domspatzen and the Bläserkreis für Alte Musik Hamburg wind ensemble, conducted by Hanns-Martin Schneidt. The complete psalms were recorded, as part of the complete recordings of works by Schütz, by the Dresdner Kammerchor and organist Ludger Rémy, conducted by Hans-Christoph Rademann. A reviewer noted: "The text is given the attention it needs, and the declamatory character of these Psalm settings is well observed."

Jauchzet dem Herren, alle Welt was recorded by the Dresdner Kreuzchor and the Staatskapelle Dresden conducted by Rudolf Mauersberger.
