= Justus Gesenius =

Lutheran theologian (1601-1673)

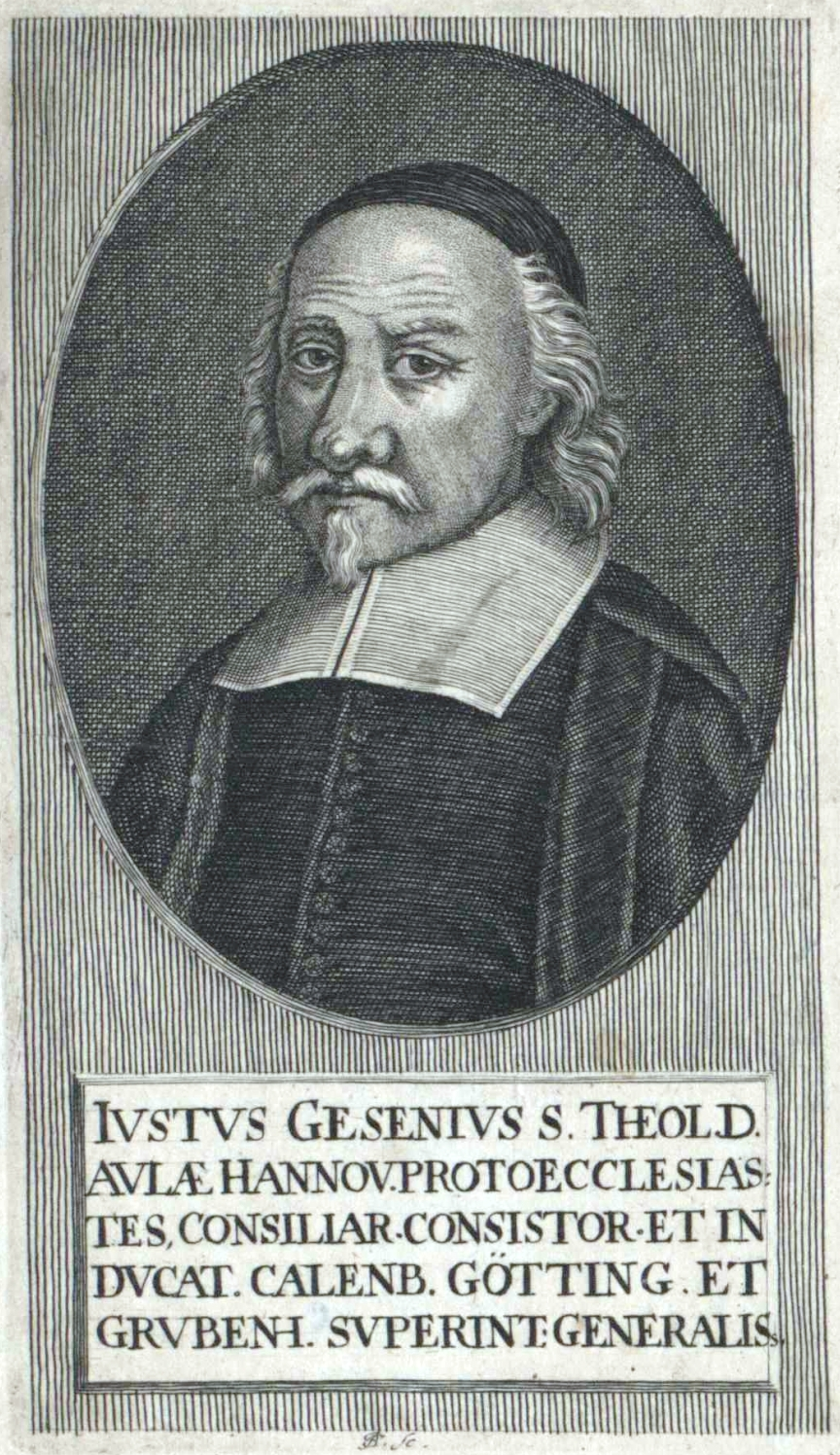
- Born: 6 July 1601; Esbeck, principality of Calenberg
- Died: 18 September 1673 (aged 72); Leipzig
- Education: University of Helmstedt
- Occupation: Theologian

Justus Gesenius (6 July 1601, Esbeck (near Elze), in the principality of Calenberg – 18 September 1673, Hanover) was a Lutheran theologian of the seventeenth century, known for his catechisms.

== Biography ==
Gesenius' father was a preacher at Esbeck. Having received his early education at the Adreanum in Hildesheim, he studied under Georg Calixtus and Conrad Horneius at University of Helmstedt. In 1628 he took his degree of master of philosophy in Jena and was called as pastor to the church of St. Magnus in Brunswick. After seven years there, he was called to Hildesheim, the seat of George, duke of Brunswick and Lunenburg, as court chaplain and preacher in the Collegiate of St. Blaise. After the duke's death in 1641, he and the rest of the consistory moved to Hanover, where Gesenius became chief court chaplain and general superintendent of the principality of Calenberg. Later, in 1665, he was general superintendent of Grubenhagen as well. He received the degree of doctor of divinity in 1643 for the dissertation De igne purgatorio.

With his friend David Denicke, Gesenius compiled a hymnal containing 222 hymns (Hanover, 1646), which was later enlarged and arranged for use in the churches. They also adapted many of the older hymns and may have added their own compositions. In 1631, Gesenius published his Kleine Katechismusschule, or " Brief Instruction as to how the Catechism Should be Taught to the Young and the Simple." In 1639, by order of Duke George and of the consistory, he issued an abridgment of this work under the title Kleine Catechismusfragen über den kleinen Catechismum Lutheri, which was republished several times. This work was introduced into all the schools of the principality of Calenberg and gained great repute in many parts of Lower Saxony. In 1723, King George I sought to introduce Gesenius' catechism into the duchies of Bremen and Verden

Gesenius was often the subject of criticism, especially by Statius Buscher in his Cryptopapismus novae theologiae Helmstadiensis (Hamburg, 1638). Gesenius justified himself in Grundliche Widerlegung (Lunenburg, 1641) and his innocence was established through an investigation by impartial theologians. He denied accusations of secretly being Catholic in Warum willst du nicht römisch-katholisch werden, wie deine Vorfahren waren? (4 parts, Hanover, 1669 72). He also published a manual of instruction in Biblical history, Biblische Historien Alten and Neuen Testaments, in 1656.
