= Jauchzet dem Herrn, alle Welt (Mendelssohn) =

1844 anthem by Felix Mendelssohn

- Anthem by Felix Mendelssohn
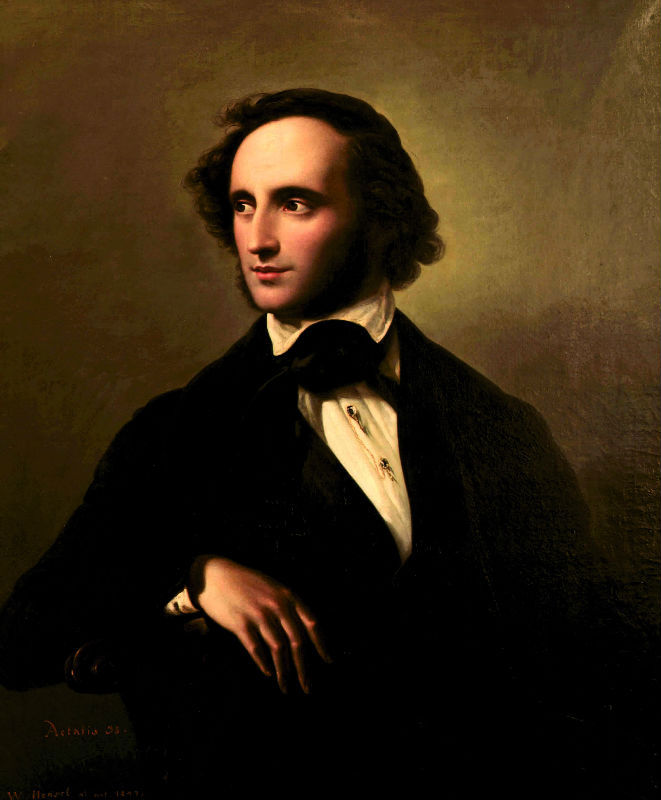
- The composer in 1847, portrait by Wilhelm Hensel
- Key: C major
- Catalogue: WoO 28
- Text: Psalm 100
- Language: German
- Composed: 1844
- Published: 1855
- Scoring: SATB choir

Jauchzet dem Herrn, alle Welt ("Exult in the Lord, entire world" or "Shout to the Lord"), WoO. 28, is an anthem for choir a cappella, a setting of Psalm 100 in German composed by Felix Mendelssohn in 1844. It was published in 1855 after the composer's death. It is the most popular setting of Psalm 100 by Mendelssohn, who also wrote a four-part motet in Latin, "Jubilate Deo", as part of Three Motets, Op. 69, in 1847 for use in the Church of England, which adds a doxology to the psalm text. He set the psalm again, but with paraphrased text by Ambrosius Lobwasser, "Ihr Völker auf der Erde all" (You peoples of the Earth), as part of Sieben Psalmen, harmonising melodies from the Genevan Psalter.

== History ==
Mendelssohn was ready to set music for different denominations. He had received an invitation to set three psalms for the new reformed Jewish Hamburg Temple, Psalm 24, Psalm 84 and Psalm 100, but only correspondence has survived, including disputes about the text and the scoring, and no music. The setting of Psalm 100 in Martin Luther's translation was probably intended for the Berlin Cathedral. Frederick William IV of Prussia had appointed Mendelssohn as director of church music in Berlin where he had to promote a new liturgy. He completed the setting on 1 January 1844. It was published posthumously in 1855.

== Text and music ==
The text is Psalm 100, also known as the Jubilate Deo, in the German translation by Martin Luther. (Psalms 100).

Luther

Jauchzet dem Herrn alle Welt.

Dienet dem Herrn mit Freuden.
Kommt vor sein Angesicht mit Frohlocken.

Erkennet, dass der Herre Gott ist.
Er hat uns gemacht, und nicht wir selbst,
zu seinem Volk und zu Schafen seiner Weide.

Gehet zu seinen Toren ein mit Danken,
zu seinen Vorhöfen mit Loben.
Danket ihm, lobet seinen Namen,

denn der Herr ist freundlich
und seine Gnade währet ewig
und seine Wahrheit für und für.

Literal translation

Rejoice to the Lord, all the world.

Serve the Lord with gladness,
Come before his countenance with joy.

Realize that the Lord is God.
He has made us, and not we ourselves,
as his people and the sheep of his pasture.

Go enter his gates with thanksgiving,
To his courts with praise.
Thank him, praise his name.

For the Lord is friendly;
And his mercy lasts forever,
And his truth for ever and ever.

Mendelssohn set it in one movement of three sections with different tempo markings. Written in C major and common time, it is first marked Andante con moto, the middle section ("Gehet zu seinen Toren ein") is marked Poco lento, and the final section ("Denn der Herr ist freundlich") Andante. While the outer sections are for four parts, all parts are divided in the middle section, split in a chorus of the four lower and one of the upper voices which first sing alternately. The section is marked for solo singing.

The first verse of the psalm is set as a fanfare. The second verse, serving with gladness, begins in contrast with the high voices in unison, then expanded for all. The third verse, "Erkennet, daß der Herr Gott ist", is first soft and in low register for all voices, but gradually growing towards the word Gott.

In the middle section, setting the fourth verse, the men's choir begins, answered by the high voices, then the opposite way. "Danket ihm", introduced by two notes by second bass alone, is richly set for eight parts.

The final section, verse five, begins piano with the three lower voices in homophony, about the friendliness of the Lord, growing toward mercy, and further to truth. The development is repeated with the soprano.

== Recording ==
The popular anthem was recorded often. On the occasion of the bicentenary of Mendelssohn's birth in 2009, Carus-Verlag made a recording of his complete sacred music in twelve volumes. The psalm setting is performed on vol. 5 by the Kammerchor Stuttgart, conducted by Frieder Bernius and recorded in 1996. A reviewer noted that the work in rich texture is accessible for amateur choirs and "has proved enduringly popular".
