= David Denicke =

David Denicke (30 January 1603 – 1 April 1680) was a German jurist and hymn writer.

Born in Zittau, he studied law and philosophy and became a lecturer in Königsberg. He traveled from 1625 to 1628 to Holland, England and France. In 1629, he became tutor to the sons of George, Duke of Brunswick-Lüneburg in Herzberg. In 1647 he published a hymn book New Ordentlich Gesang-Buch. Sampt Einer nothwendigen Vorrede u. Erinnerung Von dessen nützlichem Gebrauch (New regulated hymnal. With a necessary preface and reminder of its helpful use), and in 1659 the Hannoversches Gesangbuch (Hanoverian Hymnal). He died in Hannover.

J. S. Bach used some of his chorale texts in his cantatas, a stanza from "Kommt, laßt euch den Herren lehren" in Brich dem Hungrigen dein Brot, BWV 39, a stanza from "O Gottes Sohn, Herr Jesu Christ" and one from "Wenn einer alle Ding verstünd" in Du sollt Gott, deinen Herren, lieben, BWV 77. He began his cantata Schau, lieber Gott, wie meine Feind, BWV 153, with the first stanza from Denicke's hymn.

Some of Denicke's hymns such as "Herr, für dein Wort sei hoch gepreist", "Wir Menschen sind zu dem, was geistlich ist, untüchtig" and "O Vater der Barmherzigkeit" are still sung in Hanoverian churches today. His hymn 1646 "Nun jauchzt dem Herren, alle Welt", a paraphrase of Psalm 100 and a rewording of an earlier work by Cornelius Becker, is part of the Protestant hymnal Evangelisches Gesangbuch and the Catholic hymnal Gotteslob.
