= George L. Spaulding =

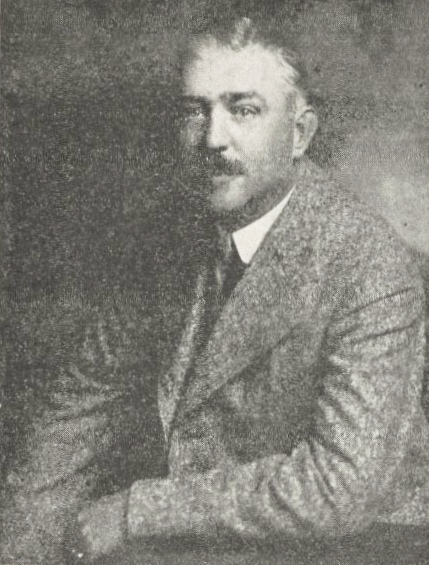
George L. Spaulding (1864–1921)

George Lawson Spaulding (December 26, 1864 – June 1, 1921) was an American composer, songwriter, and a successful publisher of music. He also composed operettas for children, and easy piano pieces and technical books for elementary level students.

== Family and early life ==
Spaulding was born in Newburgh, New York. Spaulding's mother was Mary Spaulding, née Lee. William Douglas Spaulding, his father, was a pattern maker by trade and also a well known singer in the local area who appeared in amateur comic opera productions. (Note: In 1882 William had a song published called "My Mother's Own Refrain", which he composed and had written the lyrics to.) George was a paternal grandson of John D. Spaulding, the founder of the Newburgh Gazette, and the Newburgh Journal. At around the age of eleven, he used to create rhymes to songs known by his father. Spaulding studied piano with local teachers, and became proficient enough to accompany his father's singing. When he became old enough to leave school, Spaulding worked in the local music store at Newburgh.

== Career ==
At the age of sixteen he moved to Brooklyn, where he worked in the music store of the Oliver Ditson Company, and studied harmony for a short time with an organist.

He began to develop a talent for writing lyrics and composing. Spaulding composed the song "Home would be lonely without thee mother", in 1883, with Mary Lee as the lyricist. Also in 1883, one of Spaulding's composed songs appeared in a book, with lyrics by his father. This song was called "Sail Ho! (A Sea Song)". Between 1884 and 1885, several other songs were published with George Spaulding as the composer and his father as the lyricist. A piano piece by Spaulding was published in 1884, titled "Jim Blaine's Galop". On the front cover of the sheet music was written "Jim Blaine of Maine. His Galop To The White House". It referred to James G. Blaine, who ended up being narrowly defeated in the 1884 United States presidential election. His piano pieces "Rapido Polka", and "Ocean Beauties: Waltzes", were published in 1884 and 1885 respectively. George Spaulding was the composer and lyricist of "Her Parting Words To Me", in 1885. Also in 1885, he composed the song "He's English And So Sweet", with words by J. W. Turner, and was the composer of a separate piano arrangement of it.

He left the Oliver Ditson Company, and opened a music shop in Brooklyn with George A. Kornder under the firm name of Spaulding & Kornder. The store was located at 487 Fulton Street. By 1888, Spaulding & Kornder had also become music publishers operating from that address. They had success with the publishing of the song "Down Went McGinty", in 1889.

In 1891, under the pseudonym of Henry Lamb, he was the lyricist and composer of "My Mary Green". George sold all the rights of this song to a music publisher named Frank Harding for only $15. It was very popular all over the United States, and also in England.

In 1893 George Spaulding formed a music publishing partnership with William B. Gray. The address of the business was at 16 West 27th Street, New York. Their first success came with the song "Two Little Girls in Blue". Gray purchased the rights of the song from its composer Charles Graham, for just ten dollars, changed the music and words of the original song, but still credited Graham with being the author. Spaulding and Gray published it in 1893 and the song made $35,000. (Note: This song had also been published by Spaulding & Kornder in 1893.) In the same year, Gray bought the rights to the song "The Fatal Wedding" from Gussie Davis, for just $25 and rewrote it. Spaulding and Gray published it, crediting Davis as the composer and the money generated from the sales of that song, was also extremely high. Among songs that they each composed together and were popular included "The Volunteer Organist", (Note: This was published in 1893 under the firm name of W.B. Gray & Co. The sheet music does credit Spaulding as the composer, and Gray as the lyricist.) "Carrie (That's My Darling Carrie)", "Take Back the Engagement Ring", and "When You Know The Girl You Love, Loves You".

At Gilsey House on 11 June 1895, at the inaugural meeting of the Music Publishers' Association of the United States, he was elected as their vice-president. He was elected again to that position on 9 June 1896.

By 1897, Spaulding had set up a business as a music publisher under his own name at 29 East 20th Street, New York. Songs that were written, composed, and published by himself from that address between 1897 and 1900, included "Somebody Has My Heart", "In An Old New England Village By The Sea", and "Pretty Jessie Moore".

George Spaulding also had a great talent for writing simple piano pieces with effective harmony and well defined melodies. Some of the most popular examples of these were: "Sing, Robin", "Sing - Pretty Little Song Bird", "Airy Fairies", "Child's Good Night", "Dollie's Dream", "June Roses", "Just a Bunch of Flowers", "Mountain Pink" and "Dreaming Poppies".

Spaulding's Tunes and Rhymes for the Playroom, Souvenirs of the Masters, and Well Known Fables Set to Music were among the most widely used collections of easy piano pieces in book form. A Day in Flowerdom and The Isle of Jewels, which were two little operettas for children, written by Spaulding, were also very popular. His easy piano pieces, and elementary technical books, played an important role in developing music education for children.

== Marriage and personal life ==
He married Eva Bronson Wood, on July 2, 1889 in New York. They were introduced via his business partner, Kornder, as she was a friend of Kornder's sister. Spaulding and his wife had two children. On June 16, 1899, he married Jessica Moore, a poet with whom he collaborated. Spaulding died at his home in Roselle Park, New Jersey on June 1, 1921.
