= William Kethe =

Bible translator (died 1594)

William Kethe (also Keithe) (died 6 June 1594) was a European churchman and Protestant Bible translator, especially of the Psalms.

== Life ==
Kethe is thought to have been born in Scotland, although this has never been confirmed. His name was first recorded as being one of the Protestants among the Marian exiles in Frankfurt in 1555 and Geneva in 1557, suggesting he left with those who took John Knox's side in the troubles at Frankfurt.

Kethe helped translate the Geneva Bible in 1560 and contributed twenty-five psalms to the 1561 Anglo-Genevan Psalter. Only ten of these were retained in the 1562 English Psalter, while the 1564 Scottish Psalter retained all 25. Most of his Psalms were translations from French sources. His version of Psalm 100, The Old Hundredth, is universally known by its first line ("All People That on Earth Do Dwell").

During the reign of Elizabeth I, Kethe served as Rector to the parish of Child Okeford in Dorset, (1561-1593). After retiring he remained in the village but he died within a year. Whilst serving as vicar, he had also had two spells as a military chaplain under Ambrose Dudley, 3rd Earl of Warwick at Le Havre in 1563 and 1569.
