= Asher ben David =

Asher ben David was a Provençal Kabbalist born in Posquières, who flourished about the middle of the thirteenth century. He was the grandson of Abraham ben David of Posquières, and a pupil of his uncle Isaac the Blind.

Asher ben David is one of the earliest kabbalistic writers. He was the author of Perush Shelosh Esreh Middot or (Commentary on the Thirteen Attributes of God), and his most important work, the Sefer ha-Yiḥud (The Book of Unity, an explanation of the Tetragrammaton and the sefirot), which is the first Kabbalistic treatise to be preserved integrally. He identifies, on the one hand, the ten Sefirot with the ten spheres of the philosophers, and, on the other, explains the thirteen attributes of God as derivations of the three middle Sefirot: (love, justice, mercy), which he designates as fundamental principles.

According to Gershom Sholem Asher ben David is the main transmitter of Kabbalistic doctrines to the Catalan rabbinic schools, and in particular the School of Girona, in the early thirteenth century.
