= Vespers in Lutheranism =

Evening prayer service

Vespers at Vadstena Abbey Church (Evangelical-Lutheran) in Sweden

Vespers is the evening prayer service in the liturgies of the canonical hours. The word comes from the Greek εσπερινός and its Latin equivalent vesper, meaning "evening." In Lutheranism the traditional form has varied widely with time and place. Martin Luther, in his German Mass and Order of Divine Service (1526') recommended reading the gospel in Latin in schools: "Then let another boy read the same chapter in German for practice, and in case any layman were there to hear...In the same way at Vespers, let them sing the Vesper Psalms as sung hitherto, in Latin, with an antiphon; then a hymn, as there is opportunity." While Latin vespers continued to be said in large churches, many experiments with simplified liturgies were made, including combining the hours of vespers and compline, later taken up in Thomas Cranmer's Anglican evensong. Under the influence of the 20th century Liturgical movement the Alpirsbach circle reintroduced Gregorian chant and spawned the Evangelisch-Lutherische Gebetsbruderschaft, established in 1954, which publishes the Breviarium Lipsiensae or Leipzig Breviary. The Brotherhood Prayer Book, which contains eight canonical hours (including Vespers), is based upon the Breviarium Lipsiensae, though it is in English.

Many of Bach's cantatas were first heard in the context of vespers, which are still celebrated Friday evenings in Leipzig's Thomaskirche.

== Representative examples ==
A few examples of Vespers in the Lutheran Church can be found below. The first column is the Office of Vespers as found in the pre-Reformation breviary from the Archdiocese of Magdeburg. The second column provides the Office of Vespers from the Lutheran Cathedral of Havelberg, a suffragan of Magdeburg, as found in the 1589 Vesperale of Matthäus Ludecus, dean of the Havelberg Cathedral. The third column provides Vespers as it was sung in the Lutheran Cathedral of Magdeburg in 1613, precisely one century after the pre-Reformation breviary in the first column. The final column contains the Order of Vespers as found in the 1941 Lutheran Hymnal of the Lutheran Church–Missouri Synod. Along with the outline of the office itself, the various propers for First Vespers of the First Sunday in Advent are also included.

| Magdeburg Breviary (1513) | Vesperale (Havelberg, 1589) | Cantica Sacra (Magdeburg, 1613) | The Lutheran Hymnal (LCMS, 1941) |
|---|---|---|---|
| Vespers | Vespers | Vespers | Vespers |
| | | | "O Lord, open Thou my lips" |
| Deus in adiutorium | Deus in adiutorium | Deus in adiutorium | "Make haste, O God, to deliver me" |
| Gloria Patri | Gloria Patri | Gloria Patri | Glory be to the Father... |
| Alleluia | Alleluia | Alleluia | Alleluia |
| Psalmody - Generally five psalms with antiphons First Vespers of Advent I: Antiphon: Benedictus Dominus Deus meus; Psalm: Benedictus Dominus; Antiphon: In eternum et in seculum seculi; Psalm: Exaltabo te Deus; Antiphon: Laudabo Deum meum in vita mea; Psalm: Lauda anima; Antiphon: Deo nostro iocunda sit laudatio; Psalm: Laudate Dominum; Antiphon: Benedixit filiis tuis in te; Psalm: Lauda Hierusalem | Psalmody - Generally five Latin psalms with antiphons First Vespers of Advent I: Antiphon: Benedictus Dominus Deus meus; Psalm: Benedictus Dominus; Antiphon: In aeternum et in saeculum saeculi; Psalm: Exaltabo te Deus; Antiphon: Laudabo Deum meum in vita mea; Psalm: Lauda anima; Antiphon: Deo nostro iucunda sit laudatio; Psalm: Laudate Dominum; Antiphon: Benedixit filiis tuis in te; Psalm: Lauda Ierusalem | Psalmody - Generally five Latin psalms with antiphons First Vespers of Advent I: Antiphon: Veni Domine visitare nos in pace on Advent ferias, otherwise as below: Antiphon: Benedictus Dominus Deus meus; Psalm: Benedictus Dominus; Antiphon: In aeternum et in saeculum saeculi; Psalm: Exaltabo te Deus; Antiphon: Laudabo Deum meum in vita mea; Psalm: Lauda anima; Antiphon: Deo nostro iucunda sit laudatio; Psalm: Laudate Dominum; Antiphon: Benedixit filiis tuis in te; Psalm: Lauda Ierusalem | Psalmody - "One or more psalms may be said or chanted" First Vespers of Advent I: Unspecified |
| Chapter (seasonal, common, or proper) with the response Deo gratias First Vespers of Advent I: Deus pacis sanctificet vos... (1 Thessalonians 5:23) | Lection with the response Deo gratias | (see after Hymn) | Lection with the response: "Thanks be to God." |
| | Responsory (common, seasonal, or proper to a certain Sunday or feast) First Vespers of Advent I: Ecce dies veniunt | Responsory (common, seasonal, or proper to a certain Sunday or feast) First Vespers of Advent I: Ecce dies veniunt | Responsory (common, seasonal, or proper to a certain Sunday or feast) First Vespers of Advent I: "Behold, the days come, saith the Lord..." |
| | | Sermon (optional) | |
| Hymn (seasonal, common, or proper) First Vespers of Advent I: Conditor alme siderum | Hymn (seasonal, common, or proper) First Vespers of Advent I: Conditor alme siderum | Hymn (seasonal, common, or proper) First Vespers of Advent I: Creator alme syderum | Hymn |
| | | Chapter (Latin, proper to the day) First Vespers of Advent I: Ve pastoribus... (Jeremiah 23:1-8) | |
| Versicle and response (seasonal, common, or proper) First Vespers of Advent I: V: Rorate celi desuper et nubes pluant iustum.; R: Aperiatur terra et germinet salvatorem. | | (See before Collect) | Versicle and response (seasonal, common, or proper) First Vespers of Advent I: V: "Drop down, ye heavens, from above, and let the skies pour down righteousness:"; R: "Let the earth open and bring forth salvation." |
| Magnificat with antiphon (usually proper, frequently taken from Gospel at Mass) First Vespers of Advent I: Antiphon: Ecce nomen Domini | Magnificat with antiphon (usually proper, frequently taken from Gospel at Mass) First Vespers of Advent I: Antiphon: Ecce nomen Domini | Magnificat with antiphon (usually proper, frequently taken from Gospel at Mass) First Vespers of Advent I: Antiphon: Ecce nomen Domini | "My soul doth magnify the Lord..." or "Lord, now lettest Thou Thy servant..." First Vespers of Advent I: Antiphon: "Behold, the name of the Lord cometh from far..." |
| | | On ferias, the Office of Compline may be subjoined here as follows: Psalmody: Cum invocarem exaudivit; In te Domine speravi, through Domine Deus veritatis.; Qui habitat in adjutorio altißimi; Ecce benedicite Domino; Hymn (seasonal, common, or proper); First Vespers of Advent I: Veni Redemtor gentium; Chapter (German, the same text that was read in Latin at Vespers); First Vespers of Advent I: Wehe euch Hirten... (Jeremiah 23:1-8); Nunc Dimittis with antiphon; First Vespers of Advent I; Antiphon: Paratus esto Israel | |
| Kyrie | | | "Lord, have mercy upon us..." |
| Pater noster | | | "Our Father..." |
| Preces on specified ferias and vigils; sequence often as at Lauds | | | Optional suffrages |
| Oremus and Dominus vobiscum | Oremus and Dominus vobiscum | | "The Lord be with you" |
| Versicle before the Collect First Vespers of Advent I: Egredietur virga de radice Iesse | | Versicle before the Collect First Vespers of Advent I: V: Rorate coeli desuper, et nubes pluant justum.; R: Aperiatur terra, et germinet Salvatorem. | "Each Collect may be preceded by a Versicle" |
| Collect of the day or week First Vespers of Advent I: Excita quesumus Domine potentiam tuam... | Collect of the day or week First Vespers of Advent I: Excita quaesumus Domine potentiam tuam... | Collect of the day or week First Vespers of Advent I: Excita quaesumus Domine potentiam tuam... | Collect of the day or week First Vespers of Advent I: "Stir up, we beseech Thee, Thy power, O Lord..." |
| | | | Collect for Peace: "O God, from whom all holy desires..." |
| | Dominus vobiscum | | |
| Benedicamus Domino | Benedicamus Domino | Benedicamus Domino | "Bless we the Lord." |
| | | Sermon, followed by a vernacular hymn. | |

== Modern revisions ==
In the latter half of the twentieth century, in response to the liturgical innovations in the wake of the Second Vatican Council, some Lutheran hymnals, such as the 1978 Lutheran Book of Worship provide a modified form of Vespers in addition to or in place of the traditional form. Generally called Evening Prayer, it begins with a Service of Light in which a lighted candle is carried in procession to the altar while the Phos Hilaron is sung, and the Office Hymn is moved to a new place between the Psalmody and Reading, among other changes.
