= Alpirsbach Abbey =

German monastery

- Kloster Alpirsbach
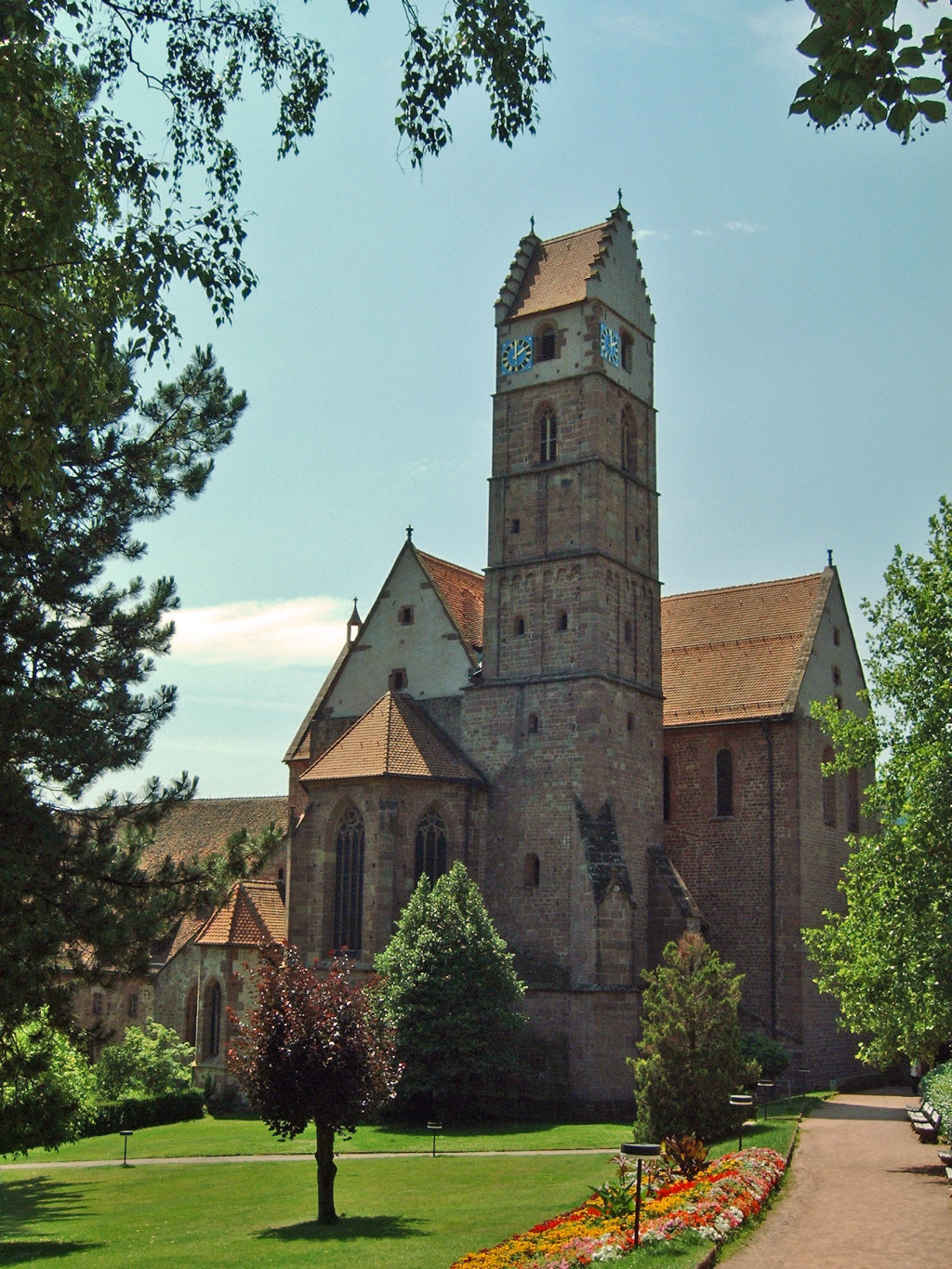
Map location and basic information
General information
Location	Alpirsbach, Germany
Coordinates	48°20′46″N 8°24′15″E
Owner	Baden-Württemberg

Website
- www.kloster-alpirsbach.de/en/home

Alpirsbach Abbey (Kloster Alpirsbach) is a former Benedictine monastery and later Protestant seminary located at Alpirsbach in Baden-Württemberg, Germany. The monastery was established in the late 11th century and possessed considerable freedoms for an ecclesiastical property at that time, but in the 13th century it became a de facto possession of the Dukes of Teck and then the County of Württemberg. In the 15th century, the monastery enjoyed economic prosperity and was expanded but was dissolved with the conversion of the by-then Duchy of Württemberg to Lutheranism in the 16th century. The monastery became a seminary and boarding school until the 17th century and was physically reduced over the 19th century by land sales and demolition. Over the second half of the 20th century, the monastery was turned into a cultural fixture with annual concerts of Classical music and a museum of its history.

== History ==
Early in 1095, three noblemen – Adalbert, Count of Zollern, Alwik, Count of Sulz, and Ruotmann von Neckarhausen – donated about 50 square kilometers (19 sq mi) of property to the Order of Saint Benedict. The site was forested and mountainous, and remote, only accessible from nearby towns by the Kinzig and Kleine Kinzig rivers. This isolated locale, Alpirsbach, was inspired by the Hirsau Reform, which sought to free the Church from the control of the nobility. The monastery's founders, its first abbot, Uto, who had expanded the monasteries at Wiblingen, Ochsenhausen, and Göttweig, and the Bishop of Constance, Gebhard (III) of Constance, all supported Pope Gregory VII against Holy Roman Emperor Henry IV in the Investiture Controversy. The monastery was settled by monks from Sankt Blasien Abbey in the Black Forest, another reform monastery, and its church was consecrated in 1099 by Bishop Gebhard. The abbey received Papal protection in 1101, and in 1123 Emperor Henry V confirmed its right to choose its own abbot and vogt. They chose the Count of Zollern and, in spite of Papal and Imperial guarantees, the title of vogt would become hereditary. It passed from the Counts of Zollern to the Dukes of Teck, who held it in the 13th and 14th centuries, and then finally to the Counts of Württemberg.

The founders also endowed Alpirsbach Abbey with a number of pfleghofe in villages in the Baar, along the Neckar. Count Adalbert joined the monastery around 1100 and donated more property to it in the wine-growing Breisgau region. The protection of the County and later Duchy of Württemberg allowed the monastery to prosper. It entered an economic boom in the 15th century, a period marked by monastic reform that Alpirsbach's monks, who were mostly local nobility, tried to resist. In 1479, Hieronymous Hulzing was elected as abbot of Alpirsbach and began a series of construction projects, but also joined the Bursfelde Congregation, a coalition of reformist Benedictine monasteries.

=== Early modern period ===
In 1522, Alpirsbach's prior, a monk named Ambrosius Blarer, left the monastery for his native Constance after being stripped of his position. Blarer, who had been giving Lutheran sermons at the monastery and had met and befriended the Lutheran reformer Philip Melanchthon during his studies, returned to Württemberg in 1534 to become one of Duke Ulrich's chief reformers. The other reformer Ulrich brought to Württemberg was Erhard Schnepf, a student of Zwingli with whom Blarer worked to reform the Duchy. Blarer governed the highlands of the Duchy that included Alpirsbach, but was replaced in all his offices by Schnepf in 1538. The Protestant Reformation was imposed on Alpirsbach in 1535 and its administrative apparatus dissolved into a new district of Alpirsbach. Until the monastery's final dissolution in 1806, its abbot would be a Protestant clergyman.

In 1556, Duke Christoph dissolved Alpirsbach and the other 12 remaining monasteries in Württemberg. Their grounds were reused for Protestant seminaries and boarding schools. The Alpirsbach seminary lasted from 1556 to 1595 and taught around 200 students. When the primary school at Alpirsbach closed, it left the schools at Blaubeuren and Adelberg monasteries as the only primary schools in the Duchy.

=== Modern period ===
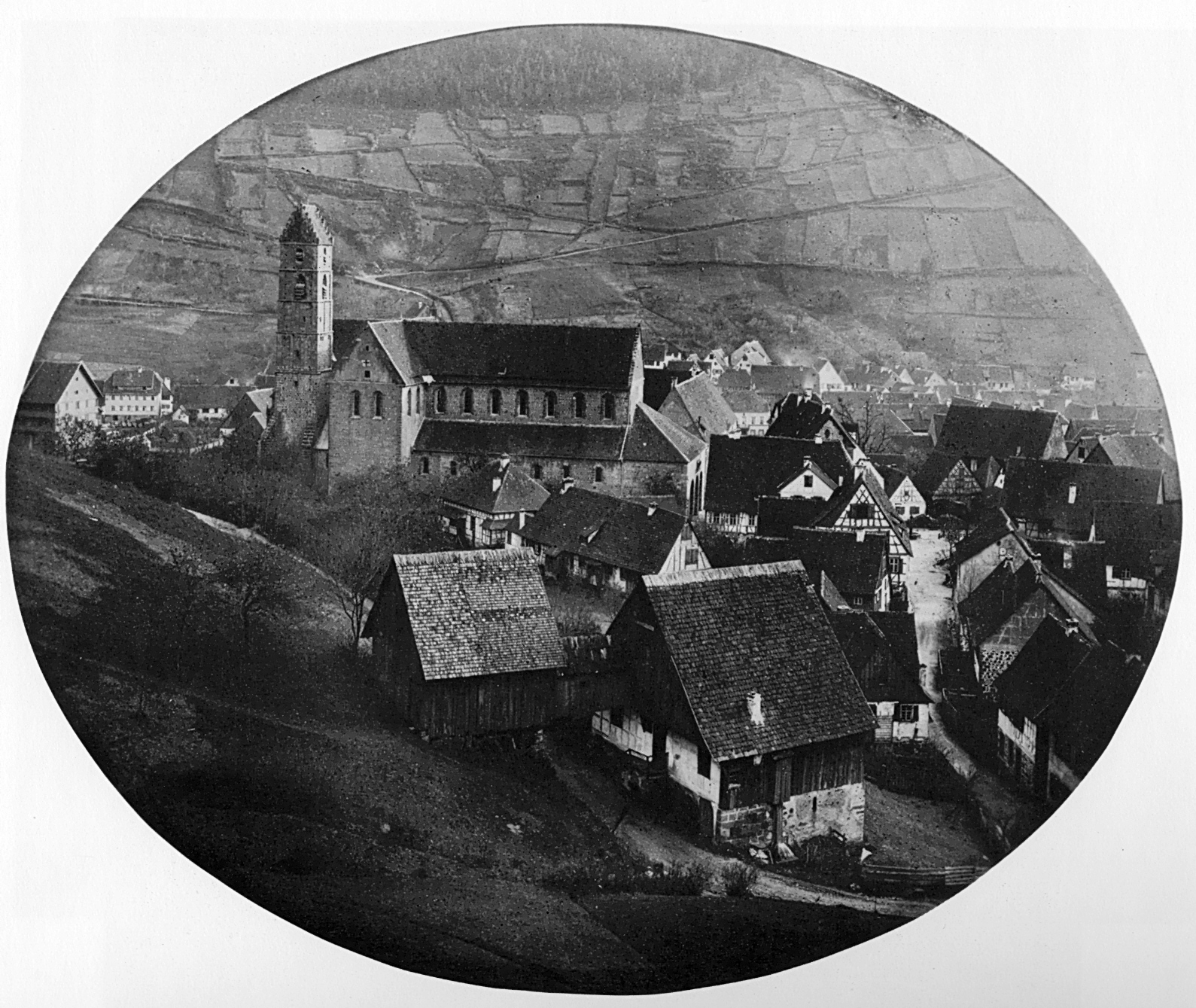
Alpirsbach Abbey from the north, 1881

In the 19th century, much of the monastery's grounds were sold and the buildings on those lands demolished. Construction of a railroad between 1882 and 1886, and a road south of the monastery, resulted in the loss of its medieval defenses.

The cloister began to be used as a music venue for classical music in 1952, with five concerts a year in the months of June, July, and August. By the 60th anniversary of the concerts in 2012, over 90 orchestras had played in over 220 concerts for audiences of 400 to 1500 visitors.

In 1958, a collection of 15th and 16th century clothes, papers, and material refuse was found in the walls of the cloister. Among the items was a pair of men's pants, 17 leather shoes, and shirts consistent with the attire of the seminary students. These items are now housed in the monastery museum.

In 1999, Alpirsbach Monastery was added to the Northern Black Forest Monastery Route.

As a result of the 2019-20 coronavirus pandemic, Baden-Württemberg's cultural monument management agency Staatliche Schlosser und Garten announced on 17 March 2020 the closure of all its monuments and cancellation of all events until 3 May. Monuments began reopening in early May, from 1 May to 17 May, with Alpirsbach Monastery reopening on 12 May 2020. Renovations on the abbey square from March to August 2020, which had moved its entrance, caused much confusion for returning visitors.

== Architecture ==
Alpirbach Abbey's plan was informed by Benedictine custom and follows after the plans of the abbeys of Cluny and Hirsau. Much of the monastery was constructed between 1125 and 1133 in the Romanesque style, with additions made between 1480 and 1494 in the Gothic style. The cloister is attached to the south side of the abbey church and is lined with the monks' living spaces. To the southeast of the abbey were offices, barns, an infirmary, and a bathhouse. No major alterations or additions were made to the monastery during the period of the Renaissance, though Renaissance-influenced murals are present in the dormitories. Following the demolitions of the 19th century, the only surviving portion of the monastery's defenses is the vogt's tower house.

=== Abbey church ===
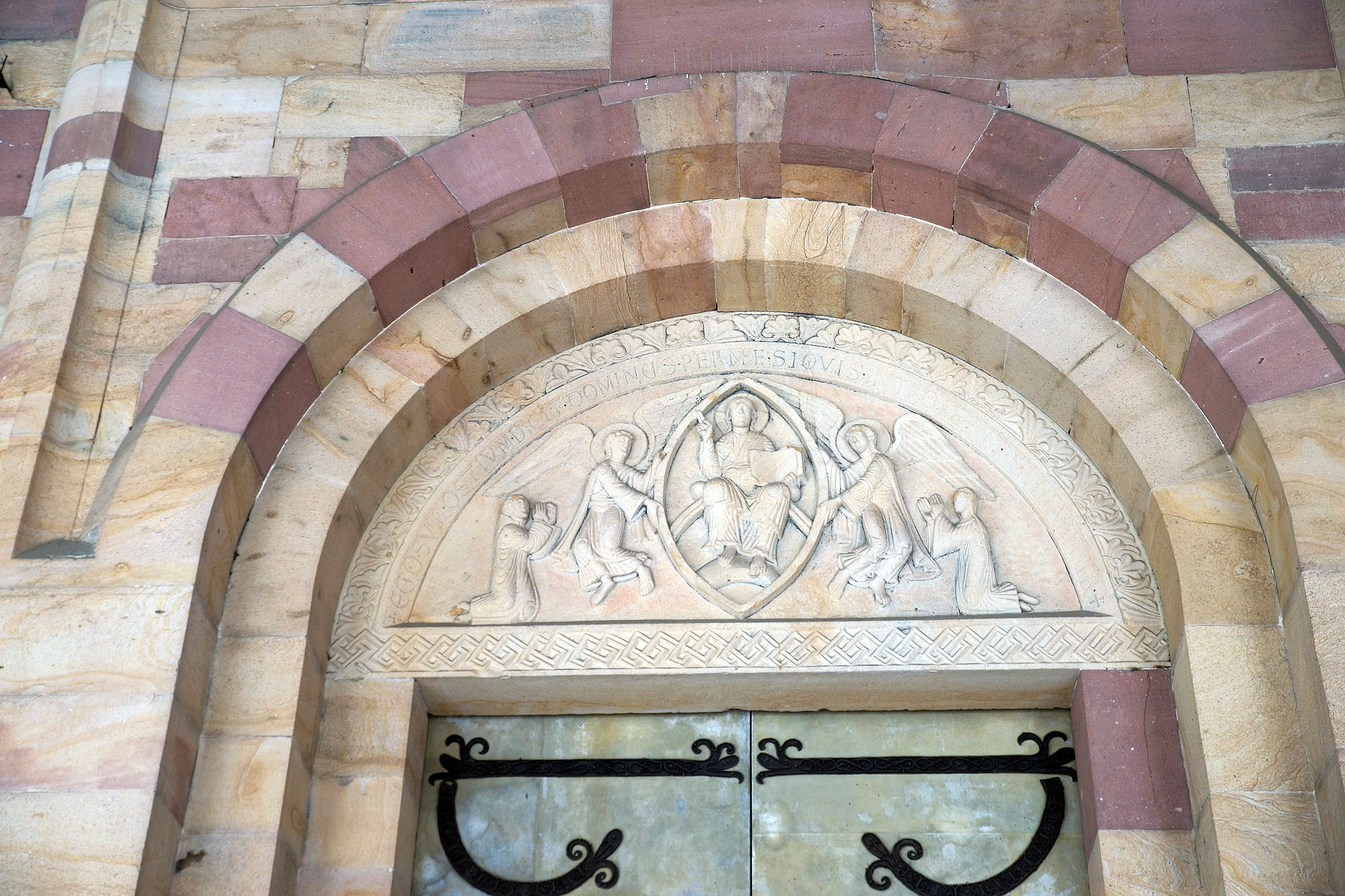
Tympanum above the door into the abbey church

The abbey church is a three-aisled, Romanesque basilica on a cruciform plan, dedicated to Saint Nicholas, and consecrated in May 1128 by Bishop Ulrich II of Constance. The architecture of the church is derived from Hirsau Abbey and copies its narrow, Romanesque columns and block capitals. It is entered from the narthex, which is called "the Paradise" and once contained a small chapel, at the west end. The tympanum above the narthex entrance, carved around 1150, shows Jesus Christ at its center, seated on a throne and wreathed in a mandorla and flanked by two angels. Two kneeling humans appear at the ends of the image; Adalbert von Zollern is the male figure. Above Christ is a carved inscription, in Latin, of John 10:9.

Inside the church, the bases and capitals of its columns are images of the Last Judgment. During its monastic existence, the abbey church was richly decorated with wall hangings, frescoes, furniture, and icons. Of this inventory, only some 13th century frescoes of the Crucifixion and the Last Judgement in the choir niches, stained glass, some choir pews, and the Late Gothic altar remain. The rood screen that divided the choir monks from the lay brothers has also been removed. From 1878 to 1891, the interior of the abbey church was repainted with stenciled imitation medieval designs. These were removed during a restoration of the church to a more accurate approximation of its original appearance in the 1960s. Along the south side of the nave is an open gallery stretching over the north side of the cloister created in the last years of the 15th century.

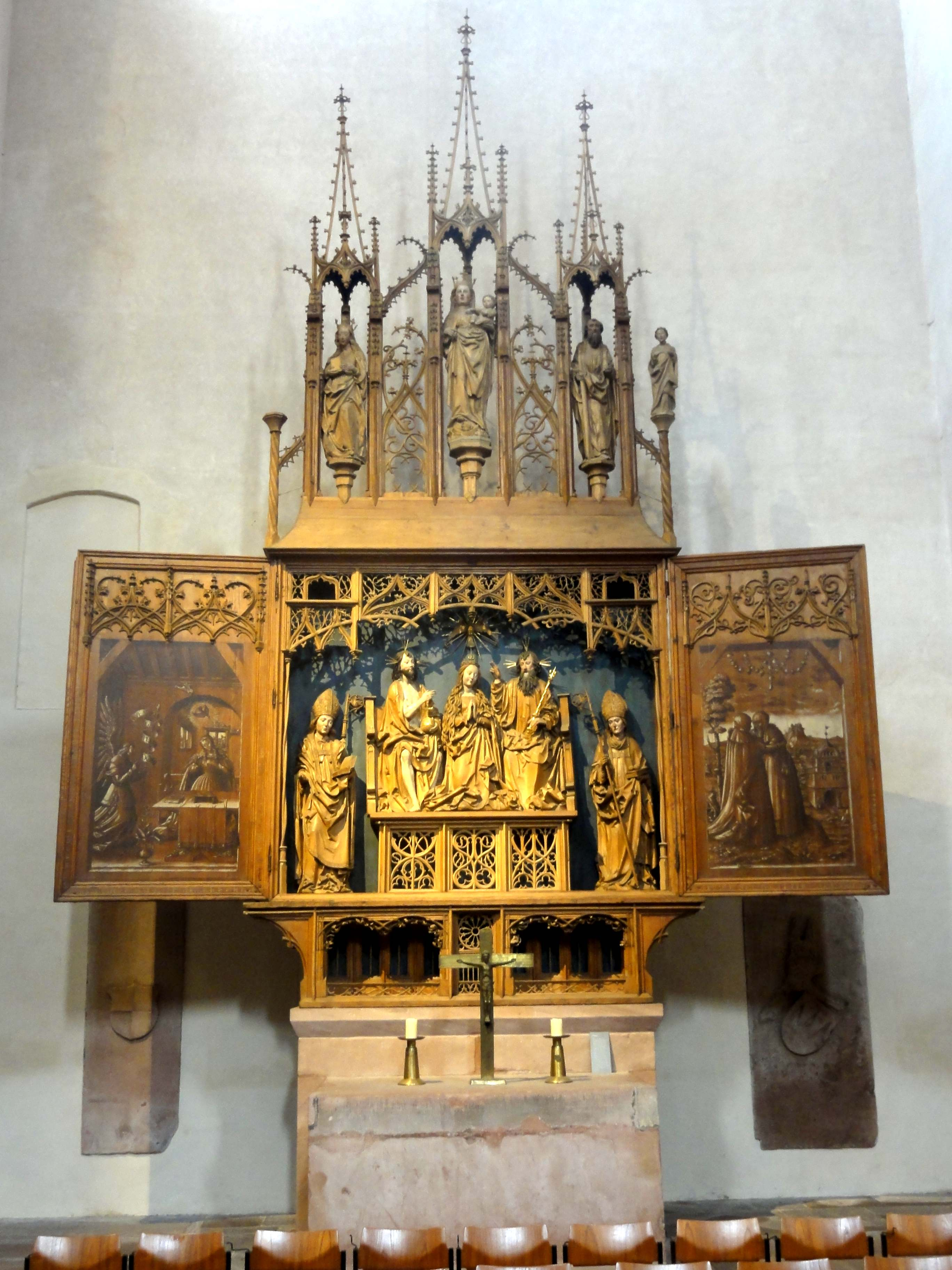
Altar of St. Mary

The choir stalls, reduced in number and size since the Middle Ages, are presently on the second floor of the cloister's south wing. They have two rows, though 19th century photographs taken when the stalls were still in the abbey church show three. Paint is still present on the ornamental canopies of the back row, and the cheeks at either end of the stalls have carved images of Saints Vitus and Jerome. A signature on the stalls states that they were completed by an "H.M.", likely a Swabian master craftsman, on St. Martin's Day, 1493.

On display in the northern transept is the Altar of St. Mary, originally one of eight altars in the abbey church. The altar is a Late Gothic winged altar that was produced between 1520 and 1525 by the Ulm workshop of the Swabian master woodcarver Niklaus Weckmann. When opened, it displays the life of Mary through the paintings of the Annunciation on the left and the Visitation on the right, and the Coronation of the Virgin in the central carved image. No paint is applied to the carved image except for flesh tones. When closed, two images from the Passion of Jesus, the Flagellation and the Crowning with Thorns, are displayed. The paintings were made in brown with white highlighting, which is unusual for the inside images. Their author is unknown, but Weckmann historically worked with some of Ulm's most famous artisans.

Attached to the north side of the facade, flanking the choir, is the bell tower, 43.5 meters (143 ft) tall. The tower, stylistically similar to those of abbeys in Lorraine, originally stood at parity with the roof of the abbey church. In the mid-12th century, shortly after the completion of the church, another story was added to the tower, built of ornamental ashlar that also corresponds to Upper Rhenish Romanesque masonry. Another two stories, and a buttress at the base of the tower, were added in the 15th century, but were plain in make so as to not contrast with the rest of the tower. The Gothic belfry has been dated to around 1360, meaning bells were hung in the tower from at least that date. The final story was added in the 1550s and clad in the Renaissance style with a stepped gable roof.

=== Cloister and conclave ===
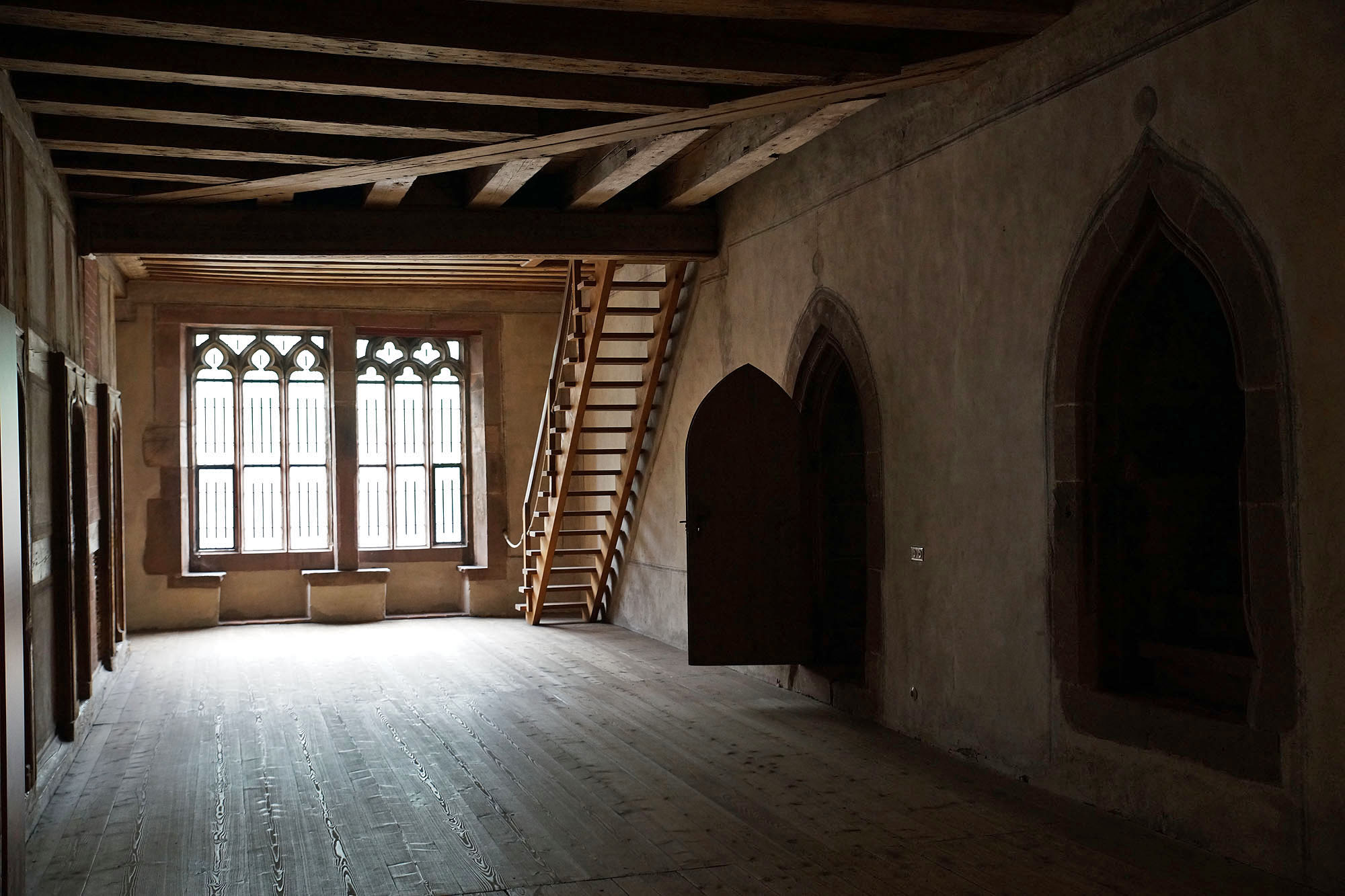
South end of the dormitory

Attached to the south side of the abbey church is an ensemble of buildings that the monks lived and worked in. This ensemble is constituted by the cloister, and the western, southern, and eastern wings. The cloister was rebuilt by Abbot Hulzing from 1480 in the Gothic style, which replaced all of the original Romanesque, except for a section of the east wing. The Gothic rib vaulting is ornate, featuring several carved images, and was once painted. This remodeling also added a second floor above the cloister that connected the abbey church and the east and south wings, but not the west wing.

The west wing is where the entrance into the cloister is found and the residence of the abbot, on the second floor. The abbot's suite was made up by a reception room, an office, and living room. Today it contains an exhibit of the Monastery Museum. Also in the west wing is access to an cellarium, where foodstuffs were kept, but as of 2020 houses the information center. The south wing contains the refectory, calefactory, and kitchen. The east wing was where the monks resided and contained, on its ground floor, the workshops, common room, and the parlatorium, and the dormitory on the second floor. The dormitory was originally a large, open room that in the late 15th century was subdivided into cells with half-timber walls that were painted with faux brickwork and, later, graffiti by seminary students. The second floor of the cloister allowed the addition of another row of cells, entered via a short staircase to account for the difference in height. There is an entryway from the dormitory into the abbey church.

=== Museum ===
The Monastery Museum displays items from the monastery's thousand-year existence. Much of its collection comes from the 1958 find of apparel, letters and ledgers of paper or parchment, tiles, bricks, and gaming paraphernalia. These items are on display in the "Monks and Scholars" exhibition, located in the abbot's residence. Of particular note are a pair of pants made of linen and prominently featuring a codpiece that has been dated to between 1500 and 1520. They are one of the only surviving pieces of common attire from the 16th century.

== See also ==
- Kirchliche Arbeit Alpirsbach
