= Psalm 143 =

143rd psalm of the book of psalms

- "Hear my prayer, O LORD"
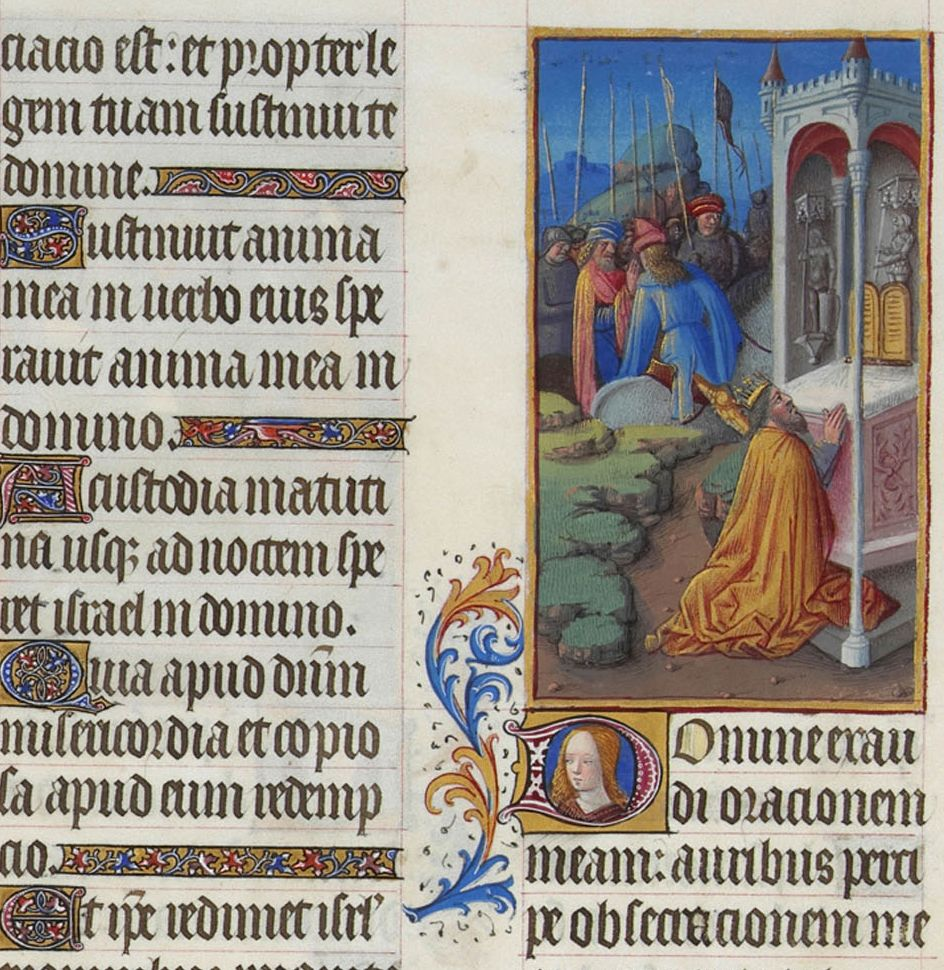
- Other name: Psalm 142 (Vulgate); "Domine exaudi orationem meam"

Psalm 143
- ← Psalm 142 Psalm 144 →
- Book: Book of Psalms
- Hebrew Bible part: Ketuvim
- Order in the Hebrew part: 1
- Category: Sifrei Emet
- Christian Bible part: Old Testament
- Order in the Christian part: 19

Psalm 143 is the 143rd psalm of the Book of Psalms, beginning in English in the King James Version: "Hear my prayer, O LORD". In the slightly different numbering system used in the Greek Septuagint version of the Bible, and the Latin Vulgate, this psalm is Psalm 142. In Latin, it is known as "Domine exaudi orationem meam". It is part of the final Davidic collection of psalms, comprising Psalms 138 to 145, which are specifically attributed to David in their opening verses. It is one of the seven Penitential Psalms. The New King James Version calls it "An Earnest Appeal for Guidance and Deliverance". The psalm has two equal sections, verses 1-6 and 7-12, separated by a Selah.

The psalm is used as a regular part of Jewish, Catholic, Lutheran, Anglican and other Protestant liturgies; it has been set to music.

== Theme ==
One of the Penitential Psalms, it is a prayer to be delivered from the psalmist's enemies. It takes the form of a King's prayer for victory and peace. According to Augustine of Hippo this psalm was likely written during the period of the rebellion of David's son Absalom.

== Uses ==
=== New Testament ===
Verse 2b is quoted in Romans 3:20.

=== Jewish ===
Verse 2 is found in the repetition of the Amidah during Rosh Hashanah.

=== Catholic Church ===
In the Benedictine tradition, Benedict of Nursia selected the psalm to be sung on Saturdays at the Office for Lauds (Chapter XIII) after Psalm 51. A number of monasteries still preserve this tradition.

Psalm 143 is recited on the fourth Thursday of the four weekly cycles of liturgical prayers at Lauds (Morning Prayer) in the Liturgy of the Hours, and every Tuesday night at compline (night prayer).

=== Eastern Orthodox Church ===
This psalm is read at every Orthros, Paraklesis, salutations to the Virgin Mary, and Holy Unction service.

=== Coptic Orthodox Church ===
In the Agpeya, the Coptic Church's book of hours, this psalm is prayed in the office of Prime.

=== Book of Common Prayer ===
In the Church of England's Book of Common Prayer, this psalm is appointed to be read on the evening of the 29th day of the month, as well as at Evensong on Ash Wednesday.

== Musical settings ==
Heinrich Schütz composed a metred paraphrase of Psalm 143 in German, "Herr, mein Gebet erhör in Gnad", SWV 248, for the Becker Psalter, published first in 1628.

Alan Hovhaness set verses 1 and 5 in his 1936 work Hear my prayer, O Lord.

== Text ==
The following table shows the Hebrew text of the Psalm with vowels, alongside the Koine Greek text in the Septuagint and the English translation from the King James Version. Note that the meaning can slightly differ between these versions, as the Septuagint and the Masoretic Text come from different textual traditions. (Note: A 1917 translation directly from Hebrew to English by the Jewish Publication Society can be found here or here, and an 1844 translation directly from the Septuagint by L. C. L. Brenton can be found here. Both translations are in the public domain.) In the Septuagint, this psalm is numbered Psalm 142.

#	Hebrew	English	Greek
1	מִזְמ֗וֹר לְדָ֫וִ֥ד יְהֹוָ֤ה ׀ שְׁמַ֬ע תְּפִלָּתִ֗י הַאֲזִ֥ינָה אֶל־תַּחֲנוּנַ֑י בֶּאֱמֻנָֽתְךָ֥ עֲ֝נֵ֗נִי בְּצִדְקָתֶֽךָ׃	(A Psalm of David.) Hear my prayer, O LORD, give ear to my supplications: in thy faithfulness answer me, and in thy righteousness.	Ψαλμὸς τῷ Δαυΐδ, ὅτε αὐτὸν ὁ υἱὸς καταδιώκει. - ΚΥΡΙΕ, εἰσάκουσον τῆς προσευχῆς μου, ἐνώτισαι τὴν δέησίν μου ἐν τῇ ἀληθείᾳ σου, εἰσάκουσόν μου ἐν τῇ δικαιοσύνῃ σου·
2	וְאַל־תָּב֣וֹא בְ֭מִשְׁפָּט אֶת־עַבְדֶּ֑ךָ כִּ֤י לֹֽא־יִצְדַּ֖ק לְפָנֶ֣יךָ כׇל־חָֽי׃	And enter not into judgment with thy servant: for in thy sight shall no man living be justified.	καὶ μὴ εἰσέλθῃς εἰς κρίσιν μετὰ τοῦ δούλου σου, ὅτι οὐ δικαιωθήσεται ἐνώπιόν σου πᾶς ζῶν.
3	כִּ֥י רָ֘דַ֤ף אוֹיֵ֨ב ׀ נַפְשִׁ֗י דִּכָּ֣א לָ֭אָרֶץ חַיָּתִ֑י הוֹשִׁבַ֥נִי בְ֝מַחֲשַׁכִּ֗ים כְּמֵתֵ֥י עוֹלָֽם׃	For the enemy hath persecuted my soul; he hath smitten my life down to the ground; he hath made me to dwell in darkness, as those that have been long dead.	ὅτι κατεδίωξεν ὁ ἐχθρὸς τὴν ψυχήν μου, ἐταπείνωσεν εἰς γῆν τὴν ζωήν μου, ἐκάθισέ με ἐν σκοτεινοῖς ὡς νεκροὺς αἰῶνος·
4	וַתִּתְעַטֵּ֣ף עָלַ֣י רוּחִ֑י בְּ֝תוֹכִ֗י יִשְׁתּוֹמֵ֥ם לִבִּֽי׃	Therefore is my spirit overwhelmed within me; my heart within me is desolate.	καὶ ἠκηδίασεν ἐπ᾿ ἐμὲ τὸ πνεῦμά μου, ἐν ἐμοὶ ἐταράχθη ἡ καρδία μου.
5	זָ֘כַ֤רְתִּי יָמִ֨ים ׀ מִקֶּ֗דֶם הָגִ֥יתִי בְכׇל־פׇּעֳלֶ֑ךָ בְּֽמַעֲשֵׂ֖ה יָדֶ֣יךָ אֲשׂוֹחֵֽחַ׃	I remember the days of old; I meditate on all thy works; I muse on the work of thy hands.	ἐμνήσθην ἡμερῶν ἀρχαίων, ἐμελέτησα ἐν πᾶσι τοῖς ἔργοις σου, ἐν ποιήμασι τῶν χειρῶν σου ἐμελέτων.
6	פֵּרַ֣שְׂתִּי יָדַ֣י אֵלֶ֑יךָ נַפְשִׁ֓י ׀ כְּאֶרֶץ־עֲיֵפָ֖ה לְךָ֣ סֶֽלָה׃	I stretch forth my hands unto thee: my soul thirsteth after thee, as a thirsty land. Selah.	διεπέτασα πρὸς σὲ τὰς χεῖράς μου, ἡ ψυχή μου ὡς γῆ ἄνυδρός σοι. (διάψαλμα).
7	מַ֘הֵ֤ר עֲנֵ֨נִי ׀ יְהֹוָה֮ כָּלְתָ֢ה ר֫וּחִ֥י אַל־תַּסְתֵּ֣ר פָּנֶ֣יךָ מִמֶּ֑נִּי וְ֝נִמְשַׁ֗לְתִּי עִם־יֹ֥רְדֵי בֽוֹר׃	Hear me speedily, O LORD: my spirit faileth: hide not thy face from me, lest I be like unto them that go down into the pit.	ταχὺ εἰσάκουσόν μου, Κύριε, ἐξέλιπε τὸ πνεῦμά μου· μὴ ἀποστρέψῃς τὸ πρόσωπόν σου ἀπ᾿ ἐμοῦ, καὶ ὁμοιωθήσομαι τοῖς καταβαίνουσιν εἰς λάκκον.
8	הַשְׁמִ֘יעֵ֤נִי בַבֹּ֨קֶר ׀ חַסְדֶּךָ֮ כִּֽי־בְךָ֢ בָ֫טָ֥חְתִּי הוֹדִיעֵ֗נִי דֶּֽרֶךְ־ז֥וּ אֵלֵ֑ךְ כִּי־אֵ֝לֶ֗יךָ נָשָׂ֥אתִי נַפְשִֽׁי׃	Cause me to hear thy lovingkindness in the morning; for in thee do I trust: cause me to know the way wherein I should walk; for I lift up my soul unto thee.	ἀκουστὸν ποίησόν μοι τὸ πρωΐ τὸ ἔλεός σου, ὅτι ἐπὶ σοὶ ἤλπισα· γνώρισόν μοι, Κύριε, ὁδόν, ἐν ᾗ πορεύσομαι, ὅτι πρὸς σὲ ἦρα τὴν ψυχήν μου·
9	הַצִּילֵ֖נִי מֵאֹיְבַ֥י ׀ יְהֹוָ֗ה אֵלֶ֥יךָ כִסִּֽתִי׃	Deliver me, O LORD, from mine enemies: I flee unto thee to hide me.	ἐξελοῦ με ἐκ τῶν ἐχθρῶν μου, Κύριε, ὅτι πρὸς σὲ κατέφυγον.
10	לַמְּדֵ֤נִי ׀ לַ֥עֲשׂ֣וֹת רְצוֹנֶךָ֮ כִּֽי־אַתָּ֢ה אֱל֫וֹהָ֥י רוּחֲךָ֥ טוֹבָ֑ה תַּ֝נְחֵ֗נִי בְּאֶ֣רֶץ מִישֽׁוֹר׃	Teach me to do thy will; for thou art my God: thy spirit is good; lead me into the land of uprightness.	δίδαξόν με τοῦ ποιεῖν τὸ θέλημά σου, ὅτι σὺ εἶ ὁ Θεός μου· τὸ πνεῦμά σου τὸ ἀγαθὸν ὁδηγήσει με ἐν γῇ εὐθείᾳ.
11	לְמַעַן־שִׁמְךָ֣ יְהֹוָ֣ה תְּחַיֵּ֑נִי בְּצִדְקָתְךָ֓ ׀ תּוֹצִ֖יא מִצָּרָ֣ה נַפְשִֽׁי׃	Quicken me, O LORD, for thy name's sake: for thy righteousness' sake bring my soul out of trouble.	ἕνεκεν τοῦ ὀνόματός σου, Κύριε, ζήσεις με, ἐν τῇ δικαιοσύνῃ σου ἐξάξεις ἐκ θλίψεως τὴν ψυχήν μου·
12	וּֽבְחַסְדְּךָ֮ תַּצְמִ֢ית אֹ֫יְבָ֥י וְֽ֭הַאֲבַדְתָּ כׇּל־צֹרְרֵ֣י נַפְשִׁ֑י כִּ֝֗י אֲנִ֣י עַבְדֶּֽךָ׃	And of thy mercy cut off mine enemies, and destroy all them that afflict my soul: for I am thy servant.	καὶ ἐν τῷ ἐλέει σου ἐξολοθρεύσεις τοὺς ἐχθρούς μου καὶ ἀπολεῖς πάντας τοὺς θλίβοντας τὴν ψυχήν μου, ὅτι ἐγὼ δοῦλός σού εἰμι.

=== Verse 11 ===
"Revive me, O Lord, for Your name’s sake! For Your righteousness' sake bring my soul out of trouble."

Father Stavros Akrotirianakis points out that in most English translations, verse 11 reads "in your righteousness, bring me out of trouble", whereas the reading in Greek is "in your righteousness bring out of trouble my soul". This then affects the reading of verse 12. "This verse asks God specifically to destroy those who afflict our souls, not our lives." Alexander Kirkpatrick notes that the verbs "revive" and "bring" should be read as future statements based on confidence in God, rather than as imperatives.
