= Alpirsbach =

German town

- Town
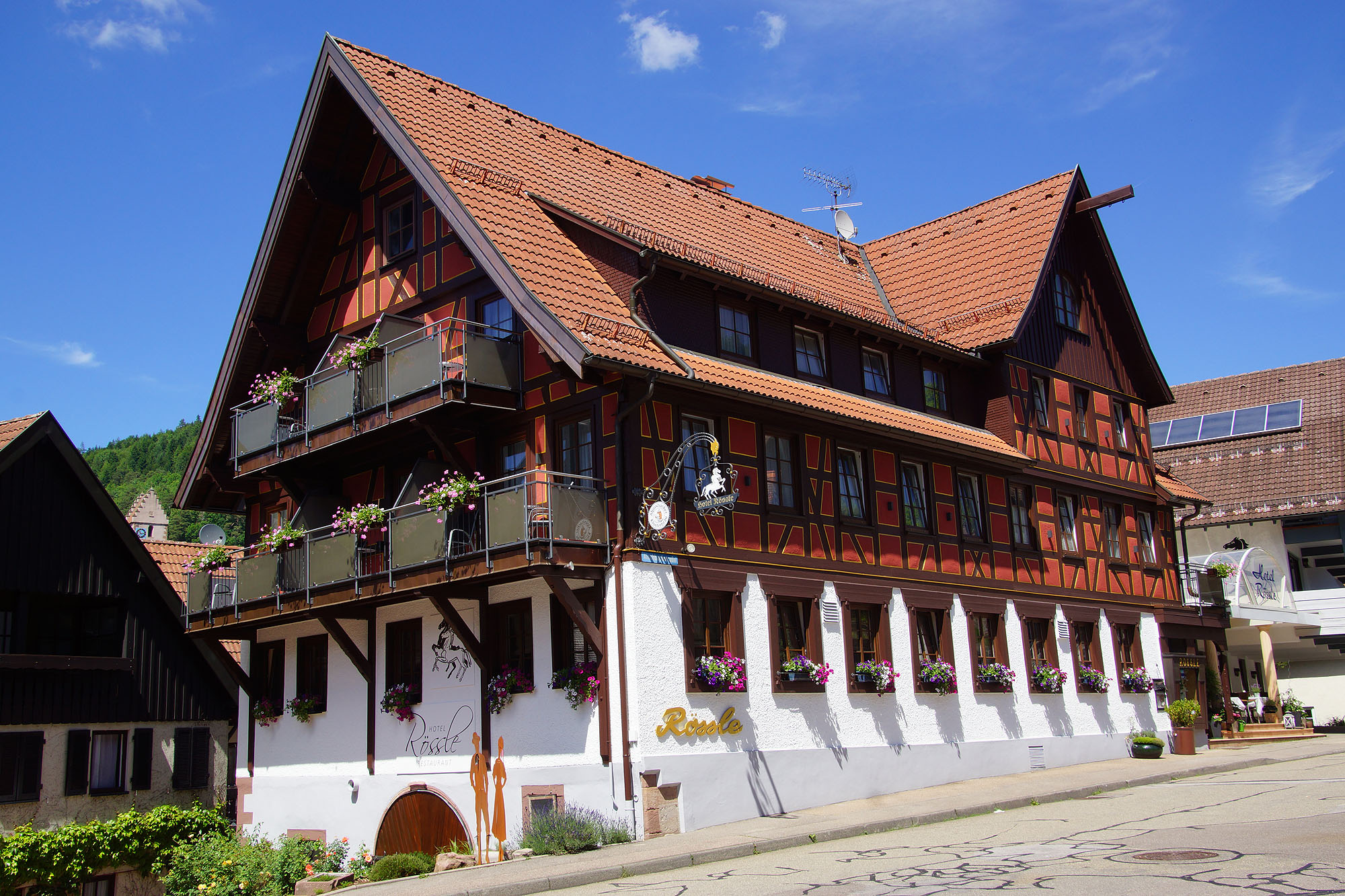
- Alpirsbach, June 2017

- Coat of arms

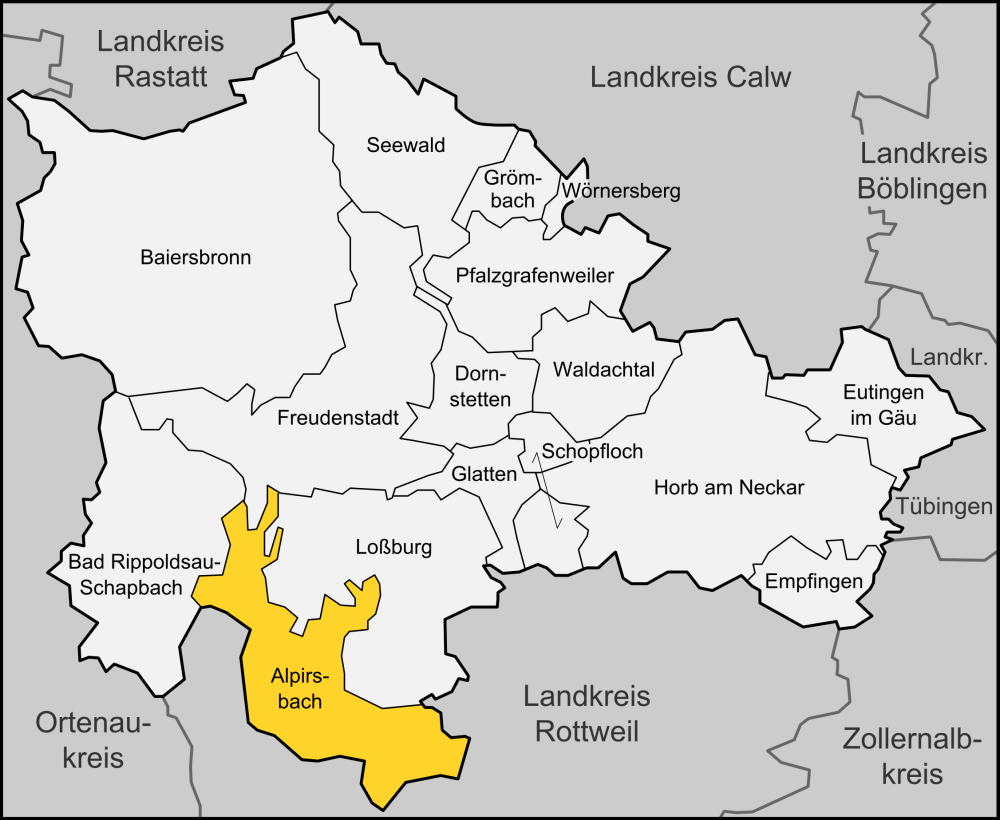
- Location of Alpirsbach within Freudenstadt district
- Interactive map of Alpirsbach
- Location within Germany Location within Baden-Württemberg
- Coordinates: 48°20′46″N 8°24′14″E
- Country: Germany
- State: Baden-Württemberg
- Admin. region: Karlsruhe
- District: Freudenstadt
- Subdivisions: 6

Government
  - Mayor (2024–32): Sven Christmann

Area
  - Total: 64.55 km^{2} (24.92 sq mi)
- Elevation: 441 m (1,447 ft)

Population (2025-12-31)
  - Total: 6,042
  - Density: 93.60/km^{2} (242.4/sq mi)
- Time zone: UTC+01:00 (CET)
  - Summer (DST): UTC+02:00 (CEST)
- Postal codes: 72271–72275
- Dialling codes: 07444
- Vehicle registration: FDS, HCH, HOR, WOL

Alpirsbach (German: [ˈalpɪʁsbax]) is a town in the district of Freudenstadt in Baden-Württemberg, Germany. It is situated in the Black Forest on the Kinzig river, 13 kilometers (8.1 mi) south of Freudenstadt.

Alpirsbach is associated with the local brewery “Alpirsbacher Klosterbräu,“ the monastery with cloister concerts and a movable organ, and the Black Forest Ultra Cycling Marathon “SURM.“

== History ==
Alpirsbach developed as a market town around Alpirsbach Abbey, a Benedictine monastery founded in 1095. The monastery and its holdings were ceded to the Duchy of Württemberg by the Peace of Westphalia. In 1810, the by-then Kingdom of Württemberg made Alpirsbach the seat of a district office, but three years later it was assigned to Oberamt Oberndorf. Alpirsbach received town privileges in 1869 and was connected by railroad in 1886. The township was reassigned to the district of Freudenstadt in 1938. After World War II, it began expanding along the steep mountain slopes of the Kinzig river.

== Geography ==
The township (Stadt) covers an area of 64.55 square kilometers (24.92 mi^{2}) of the Freudenstadt district, within the state of Baden-Württemberg and the Federal Republic of Germany. Alpirsbach is physically located in the upper Kinzig valley, in the northern Black Forest, but also in the Upper Gäu at the municipal area's western extremity. The Kinzig marks the township's lowest elevation, 399 meters (1,309 ft) above sea level NN, while its highest, 800 meters (2,600 ft) NN, is in the mountainous northwest.

The Glaswiesen und Glaswald Federally-protected nature reserve is located within Alpirsbach.

== Politics and administration ==
=== Mayors ===
- 1819–1833: Johann Georg Faßnacht
- ????–1848: Köstlin
- 1848–1850: Schliz
- 1857–1882: Albert Heinzelmann
- 1882–1889:
- 1889–1895: Ernst Gottlob Schöck
- 1895–1918: Wilhelm Rieker
- 1918–1926: Wilhelm Schwarz
- 1926–1933: Friedrich Reichert
- 1933–1945: Otto Rommel (NSDAP, afterwards mayor of Holzgerlingen)
- 1945–1948: Robert Faulhaber
- 1949–1967: Otto Müller (between 1938 and 1945 mayor of Holzgerlingen)
- 1967–1974: Hans Volle (CDU, afterwards administrative head of the district Tuttlingen)
- 1974–2000: Peter Dombrowsky (CDU, afterwards administrative head of the district Freudenstadt)
- 2000–2008: Roland Wentsch (independent)
- 2008–2016: Reiner Ullrich (SPD)
- 2016–2024: Michael E. Pfaff (independent)
- 2024–present: Sven Christmann (independent)

=== Municipal council ===
After the election on 25 May 2019 the municipal council of Alpirsbach consists of:

SPD / Grüne	18,9 %	3 Sitze
FWV	71,5 %	5 Sitze
UBL^{1}	71,5 %	4 Sitze
ZfA^{2}	71,5 %	4 Sitze
Frauenliste	9,5 %	2 Sitze

^{1} Unabhängige Bürgerliste

^{2} Zukunft für Alpirsbach

=== Constituent communities ===
Alpirsbach is divided into Alpirsbach itself and the constituent communities Ehlenbogen, Peterzell, Reinerzau, Reutin and Römlinsdorf.

=== Town partnerships ===
Since the small Black forest town and the French town Neuville-sur-Saône established an official town partnership in 1973 numerous visits and events have taken place. For example, there is a regular school exchange of the French Colleges Jean Renoir and Notre Dame de Belgarde and the German schools Progymnasium Alpirsbach and the local Realschule.

=== Coat of arms ===
The municipal coat of arms for Alpirsbach displays a crosier in golden upon a field of azure. This device was originally the coat of arms of Alpirsbach Abbey from the 15th century until its dissolution, and came to represent Alpirsbach in 1827. The coat of arms was approved by the Freudenstadt district office on 13 August 1976, though it had been in official use since 1953.

== Infrastructure ==
=== Educational facilities ===
Toddlers and children can be looked after in one of Alpirsbach's seven kindergartens. Afterwards, they go to the Alpirsbach Primary School or its branch in Peterzell. After primary school, children can attend one of the three secondary schools in town or go to secondary schools in the proximity immediately. The Sulzberg educational center in Alpirsbach houses the Werkrealschule and Realschule Oberes Kinzigtal and the Progymnasium Alpirsbach. To obtain their A-Levels pupils must continue their studies in one of the bigger towns nearby such as Freudenstadt. The nearest universities are in Freiburg, Tübingen, Karlsruhe and Stuttgart.

=== Public health and care ===
At least three general practitioners and three dentists practise in Alpirsbach. There are two pharmacies as well as an old people's home in the town center. The nearest hospital is in Freudenstadt - about 20 km away.

=== Public safety ===
Alpirsbach has its own police station. The local voluntary firebrigades of Alpirsbach-Rötenbach, Ehlenbogen, Reinerzau and the so-called Höhenstadtteile ensure fire protection.

=== Cultural facilities and tourism ===
Alpirsbach attracts many visitors and tourists from all over the world every year. People come to visit one of the classical cloister concerts or find their favourite beer and enjoy live music during the Hopfenfest.

During the visit, you can see many historic buildings such as the monastery of Alpirsbach with its movable organ or the old town hall with its arcades. There are also numerous old framework houses. One of the most striking of them is certainly the restaurant Löwenpost.

Visitors will notice that many of the houses in the old town are covered with small wood boards which are typical of the Black forest. In one of them, you can find the Offizin, which is a printing press museum. Here you can take part in printing workshops or marvel at the mechanisms of old printing presses. On the upper floor of the house you can find a small art gallery.

The old brewery building in the town center houses a brewery museum and a shop. There are regular guided tours that give insight into the process of brewing. Nearby you will find a museum of town history with exhibits on the town's history and craft traditions. Visitors can also view the Glassblowing Workshop and see live glassblowing work.

The library of Alpirsbach which is found in the "Haus des Gastes" offers a huge variety of books.

=== Recreational facilities and sport ===
The citizens of Alpirsbach have their own public swimming pool in Rötenbach. In addition, there is a tennis court, a golf court, a football field, and two gyms to do sport.

Behind the monastery you can rest in the small but well-kept spa garden.

=== Clubs and associations ===
The citizens of Alpirsbach can join a variety of clubs and associations.

=== Transport ===
The B294, which runs through Alpirsbach, connects the town with Freudenstadt in the north and via the B462 with Schramberg in the south. Alpirsbach is centrally located between the A5 and A81 motorways. Via the Murg valley in the west, you can reach the A5 within 1 hour, heading for Frankfurt, Karlsruhe or Basel, Freiburg. In the opposite direction, it takes about 40 minutes to reach the A81, which leads to Stuttgart or Lake Constance.

Alpirsbach is located on the Eutingen im Gäu–Schiltach railway line. Trains run every hour. Destinations like Stuttgart, Karlsruhe and Straßburg can thus be reached easily by changing the train only once.
