= Kirchliche Arbeit Alpirsbach =

German Protestant organisation

Kirchliche Arbeit Alpirsbach is one of the organisations of the protestant Liturgical Movement in Germany and was previously called Alpirsbach Circle. Its center is Alpirsbach Abbey located near Freudenstadt in the Black Forest. Kirchliche Arbeit Alpirsbach has been influenced by theology of Karl Barth and it was originally led by Wilhelm Gohl and Richard Goelz. During Alpirsbach weeks there were Eucharistic services and a careful use of psalmody and Gregorian chant in the Benedictine tradition. It is particularly in this area of chant that the Alpirsbach Circle has done its work of creation, instruction, and research such as that evident in the publication of an Antiphonale and Masses; in the present German Lutheran liturgy the Kyrie, Gloria, Credo, responses, psalmody and many hymns are sung to many of the same Gregorian Chant melodies as those used in the Roman Catholic liturgy - in German however.
