= Niklaus Weckmann =

German sculptor

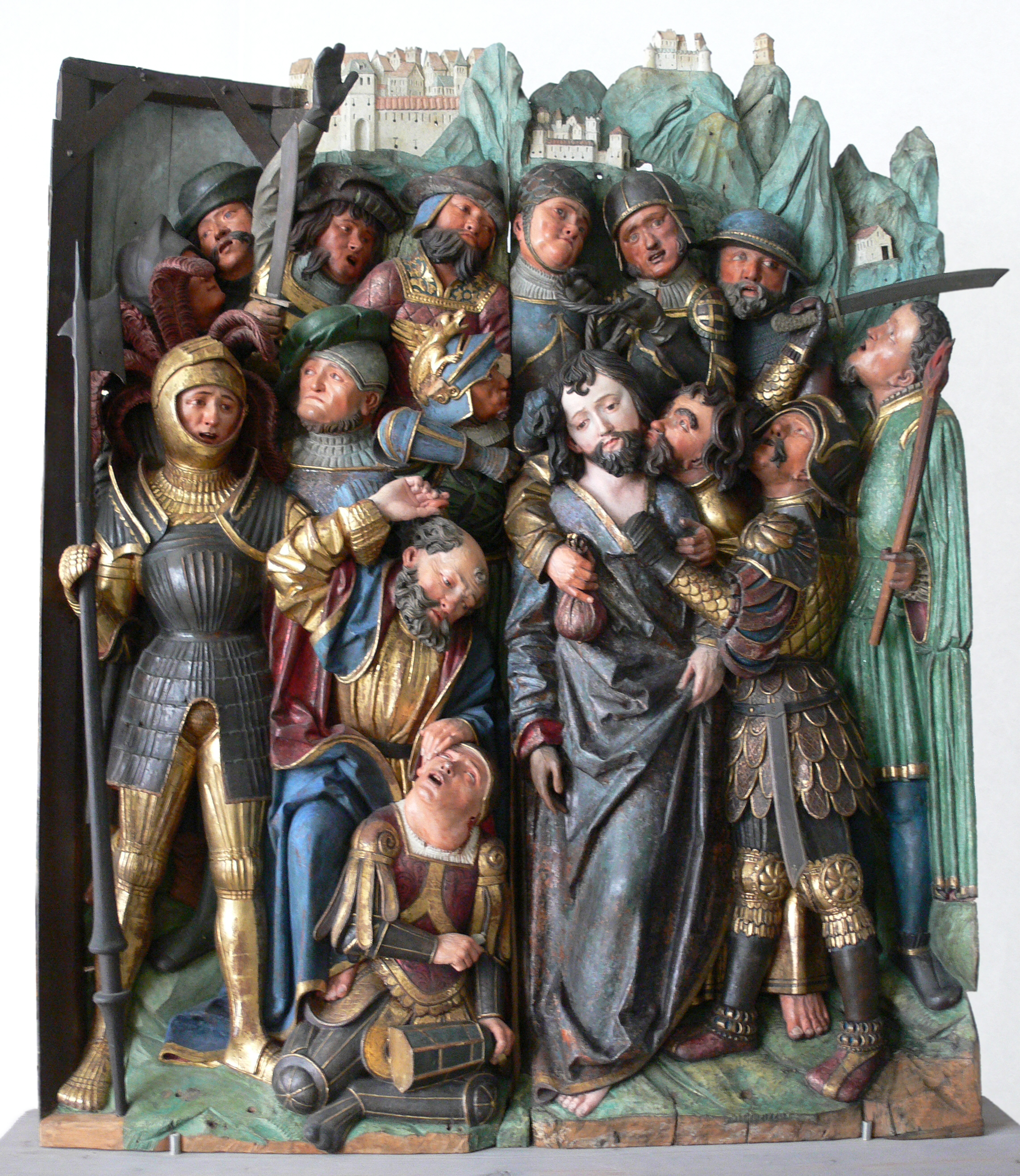
The Taking of Christ (c. 1520), workshop of Niklaus Weckmann, in the Landesmuseum Württemberg

Niklaus Weckmann (active c. 1481–1526, Ulm) was a German sculptor.
