= Choir monk =

In the Catholic Church, a choir monk is a monk who is planned to be or already is ordained as a priest. In particular, they are distinguished from religious brothers and lay brothers, who do not receive holy orders.
