= Conditor alme siderum =

7th-century Latin hymn

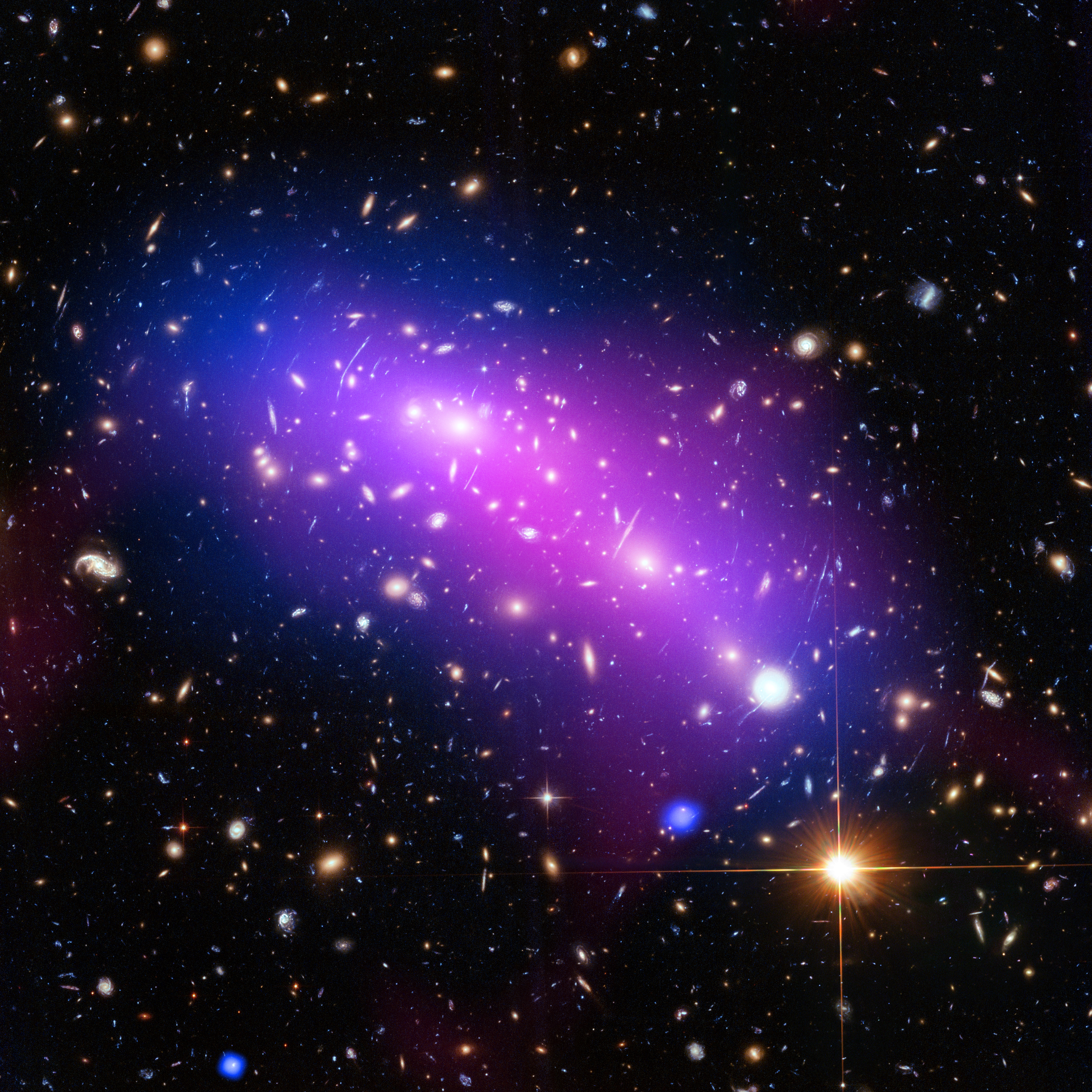
The Latin “sidus” (“siderum”) means more than just a “star”, encompassing also the sun, moon, and planets, as well as all the heavenly constellations and comets and meteors.

Conditor alme siderum is a seventh-century Latin hymn used during the Christian liturgical season of Advent. It is also known in English as Creator of the Stars of Night, from a translation by J.M. Neale.

== History ==
It was formerly ascribed to Saint Ambrose, but there is no contemporaneous evidence to support the attribution. "This hymn spans all of salvation history, from creation to the end of time when the entire created order will be redeemed and caught up in the life of the Trinity."

The hymn has been mainly used in the Divine Office at Vespers. Because the Christian Church has inherited the Jewish practice of reckoning days from sunset to sunset, many feasts have two Vespers. The feast begins with I Vespers in the evening. In the Sarum Breviary it is appointed as the Vesper hymn on the Saturday before the 1st Sunday in Advent, and throughout Advent on Sundays and week-days when no festival occurs. In the Roman Breviary it is the Vesper hymn in Advent on Sundays, beginning with the Saturday preceding the 1st Sunday in Advent. This is First Vespers, prayed around sunset, with Second Vespers held the same time on Sunday.

== Versions ==
The hymn was rewritten by Pope Urban VIII in 1632, changing it so extensively that only the second line of the original hymn remained unchanged. The revision, which begins Creator alme siderum, is thus so extensive that it is in effect a different composition. While the original text did not include a doxology, most versions do include one of some sort, usually appended as verse 6.

John Mason Neale made a translation of the hymn which appeared as "Creator of the Stars of Night" in the first edition of the Hymnal Noted in 1852. The ancient text served as the basis for the text found in the Liturgia Horarum revised in the wake of the Second Vatican Council, where it is indicated for use at Vespers on the First Sunday of Advent. The new text as found in the Antiphonale Romanum II, for Vespers of Sundays and feasts, contains several differences, including the elimination of the Greek word (h)agie in verse 5, due to a correction of the meter, giving Te, Sancte, fide quæsumus instead ("Most holy, faithful One, we beseech thee"). There is also a different doxology than the one found in the appendix to the 1912 Antiphonale Romanum, which contains the ancient texts of the hymns. The doxology is as follows: Sit, Christe, rex piíssime, tibi Patríque glória cum Spíritu Paráclito in sempitérna sæcula (Glory be unto Christ, most gracious King, and to thee, the Father with the Spirit, the Paraclete in the everlasting age).

== Text ==
- Conditor alme siderum

1 Cónditor alme síderum,
aetérna lux credéntium,
Christe, redémptor ómnium,
exáudi preces súpplicum.

2 Qui cóndolens intéritu
mortis períre saeculum,
salvásti mundum lánguidum,
donans reis remédium:

3 Vergénte mundi véspere,
uti sponsus de thálamo,
egréssus honestíssima
Vírginis matris cláusula:

4 Cuius forti poténtiæ
genu curvántur ómnia,
Caeléstia, terréstria,
nutu faténtur súbdita.

5 Te deprecámur agie,
ventúre judex saéculi,
consérva nos in témpore
hostis a telo pérfidi.

6 Laus, honor, virtus, glória
Deo Patri, et Filío,
sancto Simul Paráclito
in saeculórum saécula. Amen.

- Creator alme siderum

Creator alme siderum,
aeterna lux credentium
Jesu Redemptor omnium,
intende votis supplicum.

Qui daemonis ne fraudibus
periret orbit, impetu
amoris actus, languidi
mundi medela factus es.

Commune qui mundi nefas
ut expiares; ad crucem
e Virginis sacrario
intacta prodis victima.

Cujus potestas gloriae,
nomenque cum primum sonat
et coelites et inferi
tremente curvantur genu.

Te deprecamur ultimae
magnum diei Judicem,
armis supemae gratia;
defende nos ab hostibus.

Virtus, honor, laus, gloria
Deo Patri cum Filio,
sancto simul Paraclito,
in saeculorum saecula.

- Creator of the Stars of Night

Creator of the stars of night,
thy people’s everlasting light,
Jesu, Redeemer, save us all,
and hear Thy servants when they call.

Thou, grieving that the ancient curse
should doom to death a universe,
hast found the medicine, full of grace,
to save and heal a ruined race.

Thou cam’st, the Bridegroom of the bride,
as drew the world to evening-tide;
proceeding from a virgin shrine,
the spotless victim all divine.

At whose dread name, majestic now,
all knees must bend, all hearts must bow;
and things celestial Thee shall own,
and things terrestrial, Lord alone.

O Thou whose coming is with dread
to judge and doom the quick and dead,
preserve us, while we dwell below,
from every insult of the foe.

To God the Father, God the Son,
and God the Spirit, Three in One,
laud, honor, might, and glory be
from age to age eternally.
