= Psalm 144 =

144th psalm of the book of psalms

- "Blessed be the LORD my strength"
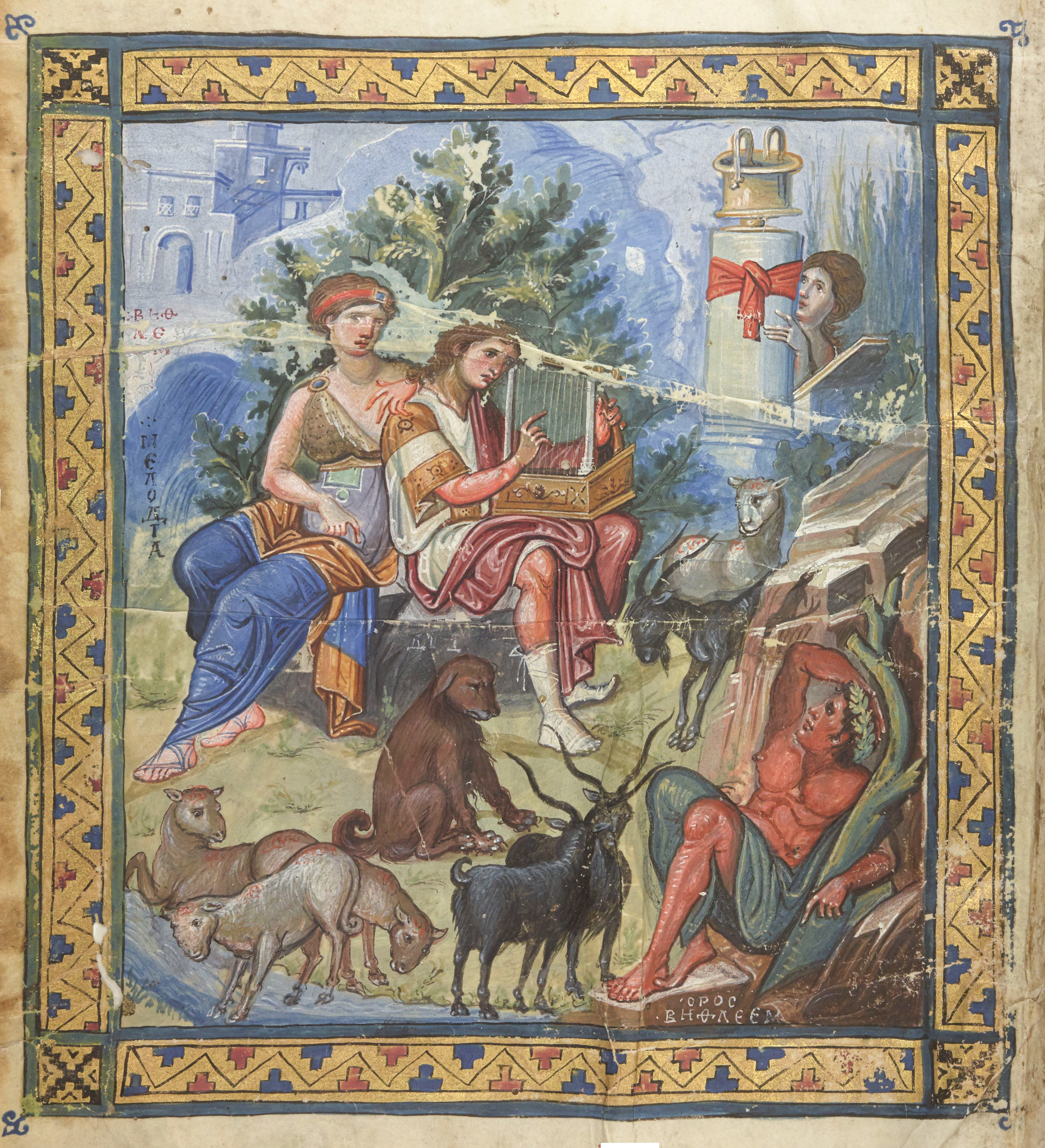
- David playing his harp, Paris Psalter, c. 960, Constantinople
- Other name: Psalm 144 (Vulgate); "Benedictus Dominus"
- Language: Hebrew (original)

Psalm 144
- ← Psalm 143 Psalm 145 →
- Book: Book of Psalms
- Hebrew Bible part: Ketuvim
- Order in the Hebrew part: 1
- Category: Sifrei Emet
- Christian Bible part: Old Testament
- Order in the Christian part: 19

Psalm 144 is the 144th psalm of the Book of Psalms, part of the final Davidic collection of psalms, comprising Psalms 138 to 145, which are specifically attributed to David in their opening verses. In the King James Version its opening words are "Blessed be the LORD my strength which teacheth my hands to war, and my fingers to fight". In Latin, it is known as "Benedictus Dominus".

In the slightly different numbering system used in the Greek Septuagint version of the Bible, and the Latin Vulgate, this psalm is Psalm 143.

The psalm is used as a regular part of Jewish, Catholic, Lutheran, Anglican and other Protestant liturgies; it has often been set to music. The psalm has two parts, a "war hymn" and a section describing the prosperity of the messianic age.

== Themes ==
The text is attributed to David in the Masoretic Text. The Septuagint has the additional specification of Τῷ Δαυΐδ, πρὸς τὸν Γολιάδ, David against Goliath, putting the text in the context of the narrative of David's fight against Goliath in 1 Samuel 17. The Jerusalem Bible notes that the psalm has two parts: it refers to verses 1-11 as a "war hymn" and suggests that verses 12-15 portray "the fruits of victory", and also by extension "the prosperity of the messianic age".

== Use ==
=== Judaism ===
This psalm is recited in some congregations before Maariv on Motzei Shabbat. Verse 15 is the second verse of Ashrei and is also the eighth verse of Hoshia Et Amecha in Pesukei Dezimra. The 15th verse of the psalm is the prayer of Ashrei, and in zemirot.

=== Catholicism ===
This psalm was selected to the office of Vespers by St. Benedict of Nursia in 530 AD. It was therefore traditionally performed during Vespers of Friday, according to the Rule of St. Benedict. As Psalm 144 is long enough, Benedict divided it in two. So verses from Deus canticum novum cantabo tibi were his division, and vespers Friday had only three psalms instead of four.

In the Liturgy of the Hours, Psalm 144 is recited during Vespers on Thursday of the fourth week. The main cycle of liturgical prayers takes four weeks.

In the Divine Worship: Daily Office, the daily Divine Office of the Anglican Use Personal Ordinariates, Psalm 144 is recited at Morning Prayer on the 30th and 31st Day of the month in the 30-day Prayer Book cycle or at Morning Prayer on Saturday of the 7th Week in the 7 week cycle.

== Musical settings ==
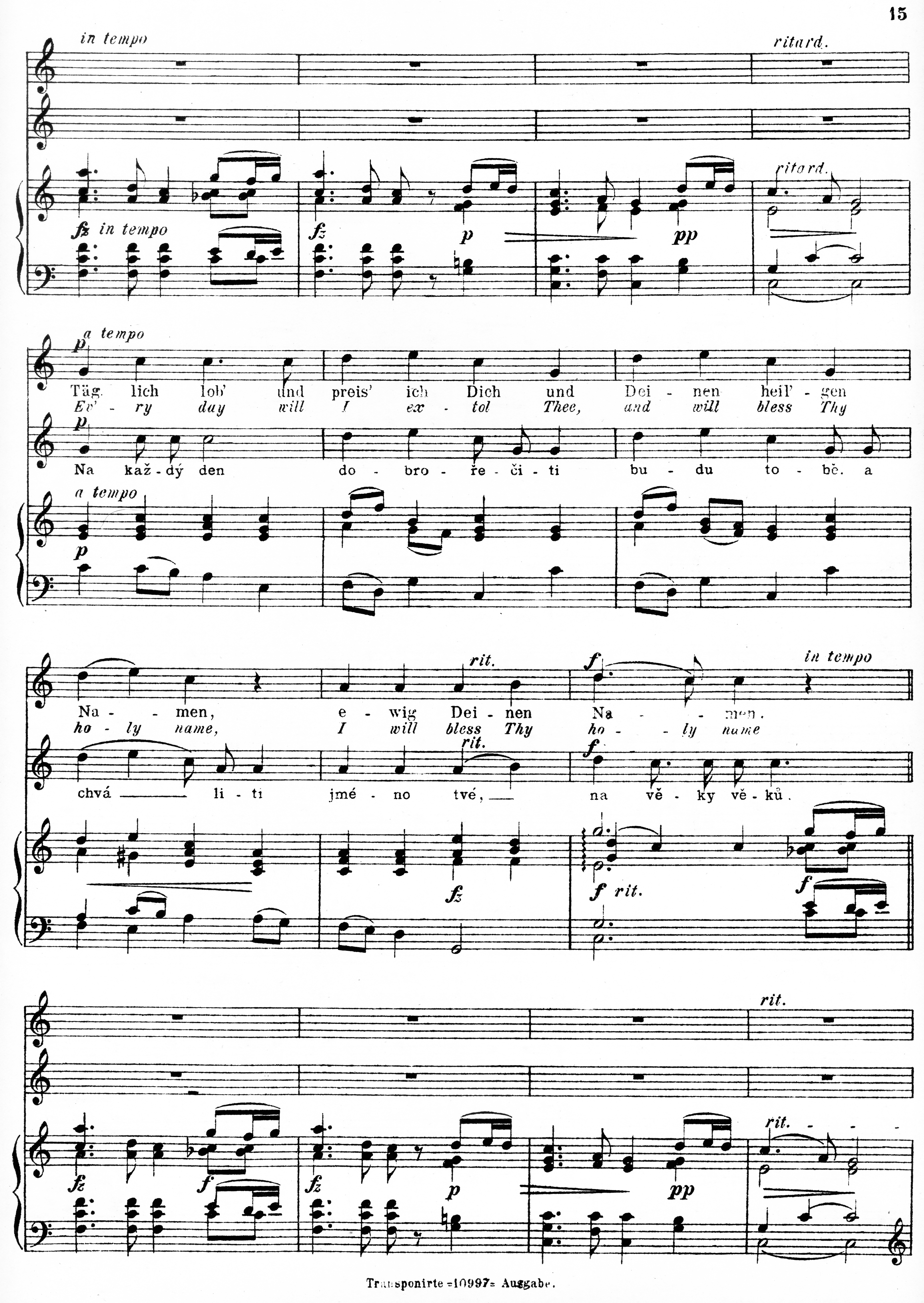
No. 5 of Dvorak's Biblical Songs

Michel Richard Delalande, composer of Louis XIV, wrote a grand motet in 1695 for this Psalm (S.44) for the offices celebrated in the Royal Chapel of Versailles.

German poet Matthias Claudius wrote a poem entitled "Wir pflügen und wir streuen" (in English: "We plough the fields and scatter") which was inspired by Psalm 144 and was published in 1782. This poem was set to music in 1800 by Johann Abraham Peter Schulz. The lyrics were translated into English in 1862 by Jane Montgomery Campbell, and since that time We Plough the Fields and Scatter has become a popular hymn that is particularly associated with celebrations of the harvest season.

Antonin Dvorak set a verse from the psalm in Czech as the beginning of the fifth movement of his Biblical Songs.

== In film ==
On display in the Museum of the Bible are some clips from the film Saving Private Ryan where Daniel Jackson quotes Psalm 22:19, 25:2 and Psalm 144:2.

== Usage as a gun engraving ==
In September 2015, a gun shop in Apopka, Florida produced an AR-15 named the "Crusader" engraved with Psalm 144:1, ostensibly so that it could "never… be used by Muslim terrorists". The Council on American–Islamic Relations responded with disapproval.

== Text ==
The following table shows the Hebrew text of the Psalm with vowels, alongside the Koine Greek text in the Septuagint and the English translation from the King James Version. Note that the meaning can slightly differ between these versions, as the Septuagint and the Masoretic Text come from different textual traditions. (Note: A 1917 translation directly from Hebrew to English by the Jewish Publication Society can be found here or here, and an 1844 translation directly from the Septuagint by L. C. L. Brenton can be found here. Both translations are in the public domain.) In the Septuagint, this psalm is numbered Psalm 143.

#	Hebrew	English	Greek
1	לְדָוִ֨ד ׀ בָּ֘ר֤וּךְ יְהֹוָ֨ה ׀ צוּרִ֗י הַֽמְלַמֵּ֣ד יָדַ֣י לַקְרָ֑ב אֶ֝צְבְּעוֹתַ֗י לַמִּלְחָמָֽה׃	(A Psalm of David.) Blessed be the LORD my strength which teacheth my hands to war, and my fingers to fight:	Τῷ Δαυΐδ, πρὸς τὸν Γολιάδ. - ΕΥΛΟΓΗΤΟΣ Κύριος ὁ Θεός μου ὁ διδάσκων τὰς χεῖράς μου εἰς παράταξιν, τοὺς δακτύλους μου εἰς πόλεμον·
2	חַסְדִּ֥י וּמְצוּדָתִי֮ מִשְׂגַּבִּ֢י וּֽמְפַלְטִ֫י־לִ֥י מָ֭גִנִּי וּב֣וֹ חָסִ֑יתִי הָרוֹדֵ֖ד עַמִּ֣י תַחְתָּֽי׃	My goodness, and my fortress; my high tower, and my deliverer; my shield, and he in whom I trust; who subdueth my people under me.	ἔλεός μου καὶ καταφυγή μου, ἀντιλήπτωρ μου καὶ ῥύστης μου, ὑπερασπιστής μου, καὶ ἐπ᾿ αὐτῷ ἤλπισα, ὁ ὑποτάσσων τὸν λαόν μου ὑπ᾿ ἐμέ.
3	יְֽהֹוָ֗ה מָֽה־אָ֭דָם וַתֵּדָעֵ֑הוּ בֶּן־אֱ֝נ֗וֹשׁ וַתְּחַשְּׁבֵֽהוּ׃	LORD, what is man, that thou takest knowledge of him! or the son of man, that thou makest account of him!	Κύριε, τί ἐστιν ἄνθρωπος ὅτι ἐγνώσθης αὐτῷ, ἢ υἱὸς ἀνθρώπου ὅτι λογίζῃ αὐτῷ;
4	אָ֭דָם לַהֶ֣בֶל דָּמָ֑ה יָ֝מָ֗יו כְּצֵ֣ל עוֹבֵֽר׃	Man is like to vanity: his days are as a shadow that passeth away.	ἄνθρωπος ματαιότητι ὡμοιώθη, αἱ ἡμέραι αὐτοῦ ὡσεὶ σκιὰ παράγουσι.
5	יְ֭הֹוָה הַט־שָׁמֶ֣יךָ וְתֵרֵ֑ד גַּ֖ע בֶּהָרִ֣ים וְֽיֶעֱשָֽׁנוּ׃	Bow thy heavens, O LORD, and come down: touch the mountains, and they shall smoke.	Κύριε, κλῖνον οὐρανοὺς καὶ κατάβηθι, ἅψαι τῶν ὀρέων, καὶ καπνισθήσονται.
6	בְּר֣וֹק בָּ֭רָק וּתְפִיצֵ֑ם שְׁלַ֥ח חִ֝צֶּ֗יךָ וּתְהֻמֵּֽם׃	Cast forth lightning, and scatter them: shoot out thine arrows, and destroy them.	ἄστραψον ἀστραπὴν καὶ σκορπιεῖς αὐτούς, ἐξαπόστειλον τὰ βέλη σου καὶ συνταράξεις αὐτούς.
7	שְׁלַ֥ח יָדֶ֗יךָ מִ֫מָּר֥וֹם פְּצֵ֣נִי וְ֭הַצִּילֵנִי מִמַּ֣יִם רַבִּ֑ים מִ֝יַּ֗ד בְּנֵ֣י נֵכָֽר׃	Send thine hand from above; rid me, and deliver me out of great waters, from the hand of strange children;	ἐξαπόστειλον τὴν χεῖρά σου ἐξ ὕψους, ἐξελοῦ με καὶ ρῦσαί με ἐξ ὑδάτων πολλῶν, ἐκ χειρὸς υἱῶν ἀλλοτρίων,
8	אֲשֶׁ֣ר פִּ֭יהֶם דִּבֶּר־שָׁ֑וְא וִ֝ימִינָ֗ם יְמִ֣ין שָֽׁקֶר׃	Whose mouth speaketh vanity, and their right hand is a right hand of falsehood.	ὧν τὸ στόμα ἐλάλησε ματαιότητα, καὶ ἡ δεξιὰ αὐτῶν δεξιὰ ἀδικίας.
9	אֱֽלֹהִ֗ים שִׁ֣יר חָ֭דָשׁ אָשִׁ֣ירָה לָּ֑ךְ בְּנֵ֥בֶל עָ֝שׂ֗וֹר אֲזַמְּרָה־לָּֽךְ׃	I will sing a new song unto thee, O God: upon a psaltery and an instrument of ten strings will I sing praises unto thee.	ὁ Θεός, ᾠδὴν καινὴν ᾄσομαί σοι, ἐν ψαλτηρίῳ δεκαχόρδῳ ψαλῶ σοι
10	הַנּוֹתֵ֥ן תְּשׁוּעָ֗ה לַמְּלָ֫כִ֥ים הַ֭פּוֹצֶה אֶת־דָּוִ֥ד עַבְדּ֗וֹ מֵחֶ֥רֶב רָעָֽה׃	It is he that giveth salvation unto kings: who delivereth David his servant from the hurtful sword.	τῷ διδόντι τὴν σωτηρίαν τοῖς βασιλεῦσι, τῷ λυτρουμένῳ Δαυΐδ τὸν δοῦλον αὐτοῦ ἐκ ρομφαίας πονηρᾶς.
11	פְּצֵ֥נִי וְהַצִּילֵנִי֮ מִיַּ֢ד בְּֽנֵי־נֵ֫כָ֥ר אֲשֶׁ֣ר פִּ֭יהֶם דִּבֶּר־שָׁ֑וְא וִ֝ימִינָ֗ם יְמִ֣ין שָֽׁקֶר׃	Rid me, and deliver me from the hand of strange children, whose mouth speaketh vanity, and their right hand is a right hand of falsehood:	ρῦσαί με καὶ ἐξελοῦ με ἐκ χειρὸς υἱῶν ἀλλοτρίων, ὧν τὸ στόμα ἐλάλησε ματαιότητα καὶ ἡ δεξιὰ αὐτῶν δεξιὰ ἀδικίας.
12	אֲשֶׁ֤ר בָּנֵ֨ינוּ ׀ כִּנְטִעִים֮ מְגֻדָּלִ֢ים בִּֽנְעוּרֵ֫יהֶ֥ם בְּנוֹתֵ֥ינוּ כְזָוִיֹּ֑ת מְ֝חֻטָּב֗וֹת תַּבְנִ֥ית הֵיכָֽל׃	That our sons may be as plants grown up in their youth; that our daughters may be as corner stones, polished after the similitude of a palace:	ὧν οἱ υἱοὶ ὡς νεόφυτα ἱδρυμένα ἐν τῇ νεότητι αὐτῶν, αἱ θυγατέρες αὐτῶν κεκαλλωπισμέναι, περικεκοσμημέναι ὡς ὁμοίωμα ναοῦ,
13	מְזָוֵ֣ינוּ מְלֵאִים֮ מְפִיקִ֥ים מִזַּ֗ן אֶ֫ל־זַ֥ן צֹאונֵ֣נוּ מַ֭אֲלִיפוֹת מְרֻבָּב֗וֹת בְּחוּצוֹתֵֽינוּ׃	That our garners may be full, affording all manner of store: that our sheep may bring forth thousands and ten thousands in our streets.	τὰ ταμιεῖα αὐτῶν πλήρη, ἐξερευγόμενα ἐκ τούτου εἰς τοῦτο, τὰ πρόβατα αὐτῶν πολύτοκα, πληθύνοντα ἐν ταῖς ἐξόδοις αὐτῶν,
14	אַלּוּפֵ֗ינוּ מְֽסֻבָּ֫לִ֥ים אֵֽין־פֶּ֭רֶץ וְאֵ֣ין יוֹצֵ֑את וְאֵ֥ין צְ֝וָחָ֗ה בִּרְחֹבֹתֵֽינוּ׃	That our oxen may be strong to labour; that there be no breaking in, nor going out; that there be no complaining in our streets.	οἱ βόες αὐτῶν παχεῖς, οὐκ ἔστι κατάπτωμα φραγμοῦ, οὐδὲ διέξοδος, οὐδὲ κραυγὴ ἐν ταῖς πλατείαις αὐτῶν,
15	אַשְׁרֵ֣י הָ֭עָם שֶׁכָּ֣כָה לּ֑וֹ אַֽשְׁרֵ֥י הָ֝עָ֗ם שֱׁיְהֹוָ֥ה אֱלֹהָֽיו׃	Happy is that people, that is in such a case: yea, happy is that people, whose God is the LORD.	ἐμακάρισαν τὸν λαόν, ᾧ ταῦτά ἐστι· μακάριος ὁ λαός, οὗ Κύριος ὁ Θεὸς αὐτοῦ.

=== Verse 1 ===
The first verse is rendered in the King James Version (KJV) as

"Blessed be the LORD my strength, which teacheth my hands to war, and my fingers to fight."

This translates the Hebrew:

ברוך יהוה צורי המלמד ידי לקרב אצבעותי למלחמה׃

Thus, in KJV "my strength" renders צורי (lit. "my rock").

But the Septuagint reads

Εὐλογητὸς Κύριος ὁ Θεός μου ὁ διδάσκων τὰς χεῖράς μου εἰς παράταξιν, τοὺς δακτύλους μου εἰς πόλεμον

having Θεός μου "my God" where the Masoretic has "my rock/strength". This was the text rendered by the Vulgata Clementina,

Benedictus Dominus Deus meus, qui docet manus meas ad prælium, et digitos meos ad bellum.

This Latin translation was the one which was influential in Western Christianity during the Middle Ages. With the development of the ideal of the knighthood in the 12th century, the verse came to be seen as a fitting prayer for the Christian warrior, and references to it are found inscribed on a number of high medieval swords, most notably on the pommel of the Imperial Sword of Otto IV (made c. 1198).

=== Verse 12 ===
That our sons may be as plants grown up in their youth;
That our daughters may be as pillars,
Sculptured in palace style.

The Jerusalem Bible suggests that the psalmist may have in mind a caryatid, a sculpted female figure serving as an architectural support.

== General and cited references ==
- Nosson Scherman (1984). The Complete Artscroll Siddur. Mesorah Publications. ISBN 978-0899066509.
