= Psalm 147 =

147th psalm of the book of psalms

- "Praise ye the LORD: for it is good to sing praises"
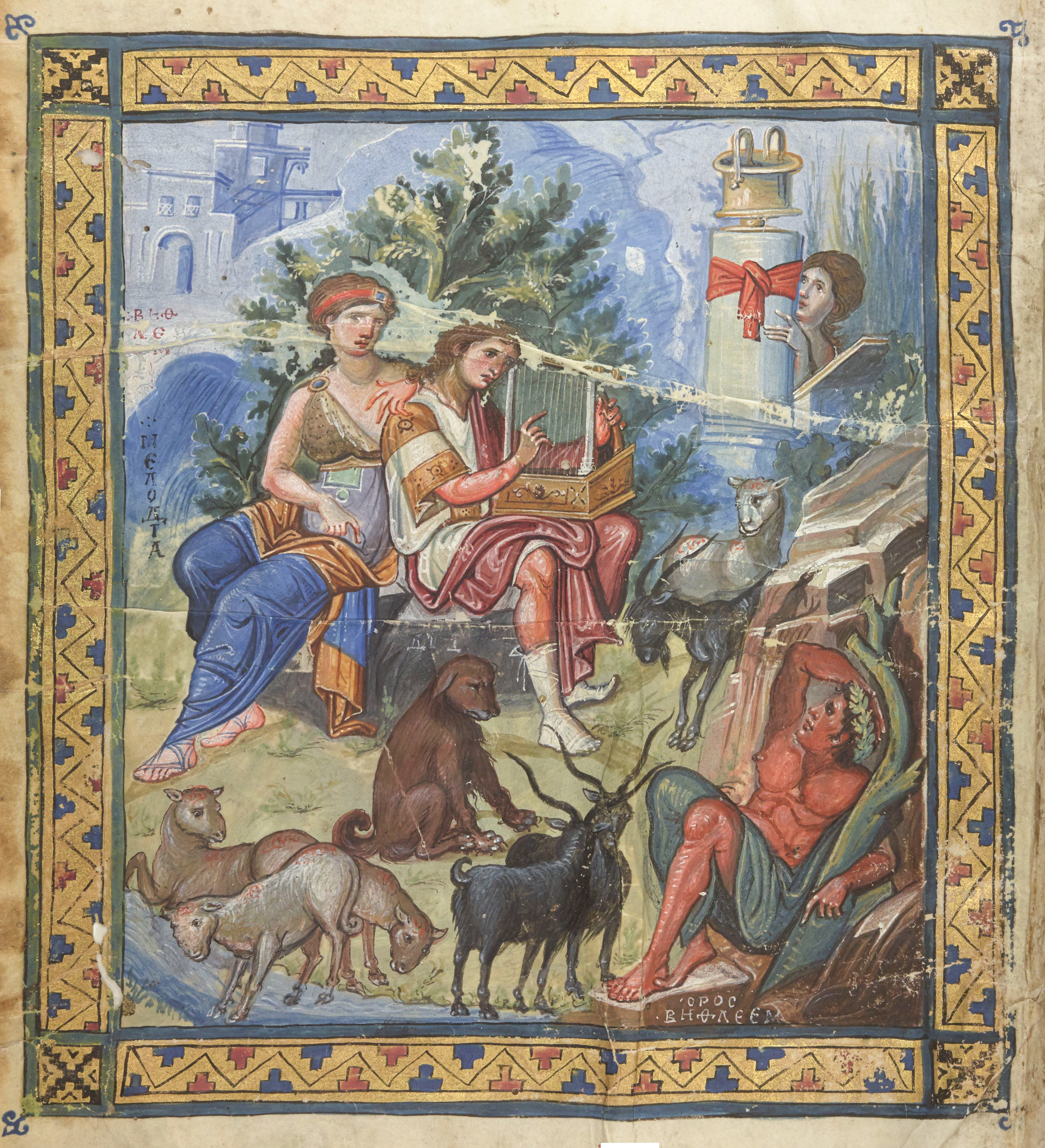
- David playing his harp, Paris Psalter, c. 960, Constantinople
- Other name: Psalm 146 and Psalm 147 (Vulgate); "Laudate Dominum quoniam bonum psalmus"; "Lauda Jerusalem Dominum"
- Language: Hebrew (original)

Psalm 147
- ← Psalm 146 Psalm 148 →
- Book: Book of Psalms
- Hebrew Bible part: Ketuvim
- Order in the Hebrew part: 1
- Category: Sifrei Emet
- Christian Bible part: Old Testament
- Order in the Christian part: 19

Psalm 147 is the 147th psalm of the Book of Psalms, beginning in English in the King James Version, "Praise ye the LORD: for it is good to sing praises". In the slightly different numbering system used in the Greek Septuagint version of the Bible, and in the Latin Vulgate/Vulgata Clementina, this psalm is divided into Psalm 146 and Psalm 147. In Latin, Psalm 146 is known as "Laudate Dominum quoniam bonum psalmus", and Psalm 147 as "Lauda Jerusalem Dominum".

Both are considered psalms of praise and feature among the five final praise psalms in the psalter. They are used as regular parts of Jewish, Catholic, Anglican, Lutheran, and other Protestant liturgies and have often been set to music.

== Background and themes ==
Psalm 147 is one of the last five psalms in the Book of Psalms and, like the others in this group, begins and ends in Hebrew with the word "Hallelujah" ("Praise God"). Thus it is classified as a psalm of praise. Charles Spurgeon notes that verse 1 draws a connection between praise and song, since "[s]inging the divine praises is the best possible use of speech". Beginning in verse 2, the psalmist presents a series of reasons for praising God, including his continual attention to the city of Jerusalem, to brokenhearted and injured individuals, to the cosmos, and to nature. C S Rodd divides the psalm into three sections, "each of which is in the form of a complete hymn of praise", namely verses 1-6, 7-11 and 12-20.

In the Septuagint, Psalms 145 to 148 are given the title "of Haggai and Zechariah".

== Uses ==
=== Judaism ===
Psalm 147 is recited in its entirety in pesukei dezimra in the daily morning prayer service. It is recited as the Psalm of the Day on Simchat Torah in the Siddur Avodas Yisroel.

=== Catholicism ===
Since the Middle Ages, this psalm was recited or sung at the office of Vespers on Saturday, according to the Rule of St. Benedict of 530 AD.

In the Liturgy of the Hours today, the first part (verses 1–11), numbered as Psalm 146 in the Septuagint and Vulgate, is recited or sung at Lauds on Thursday of the fourth week, and the second part (verses 12–20), numbered as Psalm 147 in the Septuagint and Vulgate, is recited or sung on Friday of the second and fourth week of the four-week cycle of the psalter. In the liturgy of the Mass, the first part (Psalm 146) is sung or read on the fifth Sunday in Ordinary Time of Year B of the three-year Sundays cycle and on the first Saturday in Advent in the two-year weekday cycle, and the second part (Psalm 147) is used on the feast of the Most Holy Body and Blood of Christ in year A of the Sundays cycle, and on several weekdays.

=== Coptic Orthodox Church ===
In the Agpeya, the Coptic Church's book of hours, this psalm (as two consecutive psalms) is prayed in the office of Compline and the third watch of the Midnight office.

=== Book of Common Prayer ===
In the Church of England's Book of Common Prayer, this psalm is appointed to be read on the evening of the thirtieth day of the month.

== Musical settings ==
In Catholicism, Lauda Jerusalem, Psalm 147 in the Vulgate numbering, was one of the psalms included in vespers services, and thus set to music often. Settings of German translations of Psalm 147 (Hebrew Bible numbering) were published from the second half of the 16th century.

=== Lauda Jerusalem Dominum ===
In 1610, Monteverdi published his Vespro della Beata Vergine, setting five Latin psalms to music. The last of these, "Lauda Jerusalem", is arranged for two choirs of three voices each, soprano, alto and bass, while the tenors sing the cantus firmus. Marc-Antoine Charpentier set three "Lauda Jerusalem Dominum": H.158 (1670), H.191 (1684) and H.210 (1690). Michel Richard Delalande set "Lauda Jerusalem Dominum" for the celebration of daily Mass for King Louis XIV at Versailles. Henry Desmarest, a contemporary of Delalande, wrote a grand motet on this psalm. Jan Dismas Zelenka composed three settings with orchestra, ZWV 102–104, though ZWV 103 is lost. Antonio Vivaldi composed a setting of "Lauda Jerusalem" as his RV 609, scored for two choirs, each with a solo soprano, four vocal parts and strings.

=== German translations ===
In 1568 Antonio Scandello published the first volume of his Geistliche Deutsche Lieder, which contained, as fifth item, a four-part setting of "Lobet den Herren, denn er ist sehr freundlich", a German version of Psalm 147. A rhymed translation of the Psalm, "Zu Lob und Ehr mit Freuden singt" (To praise and honour sing with joy), was published in the Becker Psalter (1602), to be sung to the tune of Es woll uns Gott genädig sein (Zahn No. 7247), a text version for which Heinrich Schütz, quarter of a century later, composed an entirely new four-part setting (SWV 252, Zahn No. 7260).

Scandello's setting was reprinted in hymnals such as Johann Hermann Schein's 1627 Cantional, and Gottfried Vopelius's 1682 Neu Leipziger Gesangbuch, where the German text is attributed to Nikolaus Selnecker. Johann Sebastian Bach based one of his four-part chorales, "Lobet den Herren, denn er ist sehr freundlich", BWV 374, on a hymn tune derived from Scandello's setting. The lyrics of the opening chorus of Bach's 1723 cantata Preise, Jerusalem, den Herrn, BWV 119 ("Praise the Lord, Jerusalem"), for the inauguration of a new town council in Leipzig, are a dictum taken from a prose translation of verses 12–14 of Psalm 147.

After Scandello's setting, and the hymn tune derived from it in the early 18th century (Zahn No. 975), five more melodies for the "Lobet den Herren, denn er ist sehr freundlich" translation of Psalm 147 were composed and published from the 1730s to the 1830s (Zahn Nos. 976–980). Around 1856, Anton Bruckner set verses 1 to 11 of the Psalm (i.e. the entire Psalm 146 in the Vulgate numbering) as Alleluja! Lobet den Herrn; denn lobsingen ist gut, WAB 37, for soloists, double mixed choir, and orchestra.

== Text ==
The following table shows the Hebrew text of the Psalm with vowels, alongside the Koine Greek text in the Septuagint and the English translation from the King James Version. Note that the meaning can slightly differ between these versions, as the Septuagint and the Masoretic Text come from different textual traditions. (Note: A 1917 translation directly from Hebrew to English by the Jewish Publication Society can be found here or here, and an 1844 translation directly from the Septuagint by L. C. L. Brenton can be found here and here. Both translations are in the public domain.) In the Septuagint, verses 1–11 are counted as Psalm 146, and verses 12–20 are counted as Psalm 147.

#	Hebrew	English	Greek
1	הַ֥לְלוּ־יָ֨הּ ׀ כִּי־ט֭וֹב זַמְּרָ֣ה אֱלֹהֵ֑ינוּ כִּי־נָ֝עִ֗ים נָאוָ֥ה תְהִלָּֽה׃	Praise ye the LORD: for it is good to sing praises unto our God; for it is pleasant; and praise is comely.	᾿Αλληλούϊα· ᾿Αγγαίου καὶ Ζαχαρίου. – ΑΙΝΕΙΤΕ τὸν Κύριον, ὅτι ἀγαθὸν ψαλμός· τῷ Θεῷ ἡμῶν ἡδυνθείη αἴνεσις.
2	בּוֹנֵ֣ה יְרוּשָׁלַ֣͏ִם יְהֹוָ֑ה נִדְחֵ֖י יִשְׂרָאֵ֣ל יְכַנֵּֽס׃	The LORD doth build up Jerusalem: he gathereth together the outcasts of Israel.	οἰκοδομῶν ῾Ιερουσαλὴμ ὁ Κύριος, καὶ τὰς διασπορὰς τοῦ ᾿Ισραὴλ ἐπισυνάξει,
3	הָ֭רֹפֵא לִשְׁב֣וּרֵי לֵ֑ב וּ֝מְחַבֵּ֗שׁ לְעַצְּבוֹתָֽם׃	He healeth the broken in heart, and bindeth up their wounds.	ὁ ἰώμενος τοὺς συντετριμμένους τὴν καρδίαν καὶ δεσμεύων τὰ συντρίμματα αὐτῶν,
4	מוֹנֶ֣ה מִ֭סְפָּר לַכּוֹכָבִ֑ים לְ֝כֻלָּ֗ם שֵׁמ֥וֹת יִקְרָֽא׃	He telleth the number of the stars; he calleth them all by their names.	ὁ ἀριθμῶν πλήθη ἄστρων, καὶ πᾶσιν αὐτοῖς ὀνόματα καλῶν.
5	גָּד֣וֹל אֲדוֹנֵ֣ינוּ וְרַב־כֹּ֑חַ לִ֝תְבוּנָת֗וֹ אֵ֣ין מִסְפָּֽר׃	Great is our Lord, and of great power: his understanding is infinite.	μέγας ὁ Κύριος ἡμῶν, καὶ μεγάλη ἡ ἰσχὺς αὐτοῦ, καὶ τῆς συνέσεως αὐτοῦ οὐκ ἔστιν ἀριθμός.
6	מְעוֹדֵ֣ד עֲנָוִ֣ים יְהֹוָ֑ה מַשְׁפִּ֖יל רְשָׁעִ֣ים עֲדֵי־אָֽרֶץ׃	The LORD lifteth up the meek: he casteth the wicked down to the ground.	ἀναλαμβάνων πρᾳεῖς ὁ Κύριος, ταπεινῶν δὲ ἁμαρτωλοὺς ἕως τῆς γῆς.
7	עֱנ֣וּ לַֽיהֹוָ֣ה בְּתוֹדָ֑ה זַמְּר֖וּ לֵאלֹהֵ֣ינוּ בְכִנּֽוֹר׃	Sing unto the LORD with thanksgiving; sing praise upon the harp unto our God:	ἐξάρξατε τῷ Κυρίῳ ἐν ἐξομολογήσει, ψάλατε τῷ Θεῷ ἡμῶν ἐν κιθάρᾳ
8	הַֽמְכַסֶּ֬ה שָׁמַ֨יִם ׀ בְּעָבִ֗ים הַמֵּכִ֣ין לָאָ֣רֶץ מָטָ֑ר הַמַּצְמִ֖יחַ הָרִ֣ים חָצִֽיר׃	Who covereth the heaven with clouds, who prepareth rain for the earth, who maketh grass to grow upon the mountains.	τῷ περιβάλλοντι τὸν οὐρανὸν ἐν νεφέλαις, τῷ ἑτοιμάζοντι τῇ γῇ ὑετόν, τῷ ἐξανατέλλοντι ἐν ὄρεσι χόρτον καὶ χλόην τῇ δουλείᾳ τῶν ἀνθρώπων,
9	נוֹתֵ֣ן לִבְהֵמָ֣ה לַחְמָ֑הּ לִבְנֵ֥י עֹ֝רֵ֗ב אֲשֶׁ֣ר יִקְרָֽאוּ׃	He giveth to the beast his food, and to the young ravens which cry.	διδόντι τοῖς κτήνεσι τροφὴν αὐτῶν καὶ τοῖς νεοσσοῖς τῶν κοράκων τοῖς ἐπικαλουμένοις αὐτόν.
10	לֹ֤א בִגְבוּרַ֣ת הַסּ֣וּס יֶחְפָּ֑ץ לֹא־בְשׁוֹקֵ֖י הָאִ֣ישׁ יִרְצֶֽה׃	He delighteth not in the strength of the horse: he taketh not pleasure in the legs of a man.	οὐκ ἐν τῇ δυναστείᾳ τοῦ ἵππου θελήσει, οὐδὲ ἐν ταῖς κνήμαις τοῦ ἀνδρὸς εὐδοκεῖ·
11	רוֹצֶ֣ה יְ֭הֹוָה אֶת־יְרֵאָ֑יו אֶת־הַֽמְיַחֲלִ֥ים לְחַסְדּֽוֹ׃	The LORD taketh pleasure in them that fear him, in those that hope in his mercy.	εὐδοκεῖ Κύριος ἐν τοῖς φοβουμένοις αὐτὸν καὶ ἐν πᾶσι τοῖς ἐλπίζουσιν ἐπὶ τὸ ἔλεος αὐτοῦ.
12	שַׁבְּחִ֣י יְ֭רוּשָׁלַ͏ִם אֶת־יְהֹוָ֑ה הַֽלְלִ֖י אֱלֹהַ֣יִךְ צִיּֽוֹן׃	Praise the LORD, O Jerusalem; praise thy God, O Zion.	᾿Αλληλούϊα· ᾿Αγγαίου καὶ Ζαχαρίου. – ΕΠΑΙΝΕΙ, ῾Ιερουσαλήμ, τὸν Κύριον, αἴνει τὸν Θεόν σου, Σιών,
13	כִּֽי־חִ֭זַּק בְּרִיחֵ֣י שְׁעָרָ֑יִךְ בֵּרַ֖ךְ בָּנַ֣יִךְ בְּקִרְבֵּֽךְ׃	For he hath strengthened the bars of thy gates; he hath blessed thy children within thee.	ὅτι ἐνίσχυσε τοὺς μοχλοὺς τῶν πυλῶν σου, εὐλόγησε τοὺς υἱούς σου ἐν σοί·
14	הַשָּׂם־גְּבוּלֵ֥ךְ שָׁל֑וֹם חֵ֥לֶב חִ֝טִּ֗ים יַשְׂבִּיעֵֽךְ׃	He maketh peace in thy borders, and filleth thee with the finest of the wheat.	ὁ τιθεὶς τὰ ὅριά σου εἰρήνην καὶ στέαρ πυροῦ ἐμπιπλῶν σε·
15	הַשֹּׁלֵ֣חַ אִמְרָת֣וֹ אָ֑רֶץ עַד־מְ֝הֵרָ֗ה יָר֥וּץ דְּבָרֽוֹ׃	He sendeth forth his commandment upon earth: his word runneth very swiftly.	ὁ ἀποστέλλων τὸ λόγιον αὐτοῦ τῇ γῇ, ἕως τάχους δραμεῖται ὁ λόγος αὐτοῦ·
16	הַנֹּתֵ֣ן שֶׁ֣לֶג כַּצָּ֑מֶר כְּ֝פ֗וֹר כָּאֵ֥פֶר יְפַזֵּֽר׃	He giveth snow like wool: he scattereth the hoarfrost like ashes.	διδόντος χιόνα αὐτοῦ ὡσεὶ ἔριον, ὁμίχλην ὡσεὶ σποδὸν πάσσοντος·
17	מַשְׁלִ֣יךְ קַֽרְח֣וֹ כְפִתִּ֑ים לִפְנֵ֥י קָ֝רָת֗וֹ מִ֣י יַעֲמֹֽד׃	He casteth forth his ice like morsels: who can stand before his cold?	βάλλοντος κρύσταλλον αὐτοῦ ὡσεὶ ψωμούς, κατὰ πρόσωπον ψύχους αὐτοῦ τίς ὑποστήσεται;
18	יִשְׁלַ֣ח דְּבָר֣וֹ וְיַמְסֵ֑ם יַשֵּׁ֥ב ר֝וּח֗וֹ יִזְּלוּ־מָֽיִם׃	He sendeth out his word, and melteth them: he causeth his wind to blow, and the waters flow.	ἐξαποστελεῖ τὸν λόγον αὐτοῦ καὶ τήξει αὐτά· πνεύσει τὸ πνεῦμα αὐτοῦ καὶ ῥυήσεται ὕδατα.
19	מַגִּ֣יד דְּבָרָ֣ו לְיַעֲקֹ֑ב חֻקָּ֥יו וּ֝מִשְׁפָּטָ֗יו לְיִשְׂרָאֵֽל׃	He sheweth his word unto Jacob, his statutes and his judgments unto Israel.	ὁ ἀπαγγέλλων τὸν λόγον αὐτοῦ τῷ ᾿Ιακώβ, δικαιώματα καὶ κρίματα αὐτοῦ τῷ ᾿Ισραήλ.
20	לֹ֘א עָ֤שָׂה כֵ֨ן ׀ לְכׇל־גּ֗וֹי וּמִשְׁפָּטִ֥ים בַּל־יְדָע֗וּם הַֽלְלוּ־יָֽהּ׃	He hath not dealt so with any nation: and as for his judgments, they have not known them. Praise ye the LORD.	οὐκ ἐποίησεν οὕτως παντὶ ἔθνει καὶ τὰ κρίματα αὐτοῦ οὐκ ἐδήλωσεν αὐτοῖς.
