= Psalm 145 =

145th psalm of the book of psalms

- "I will extol thee, my God, O king"
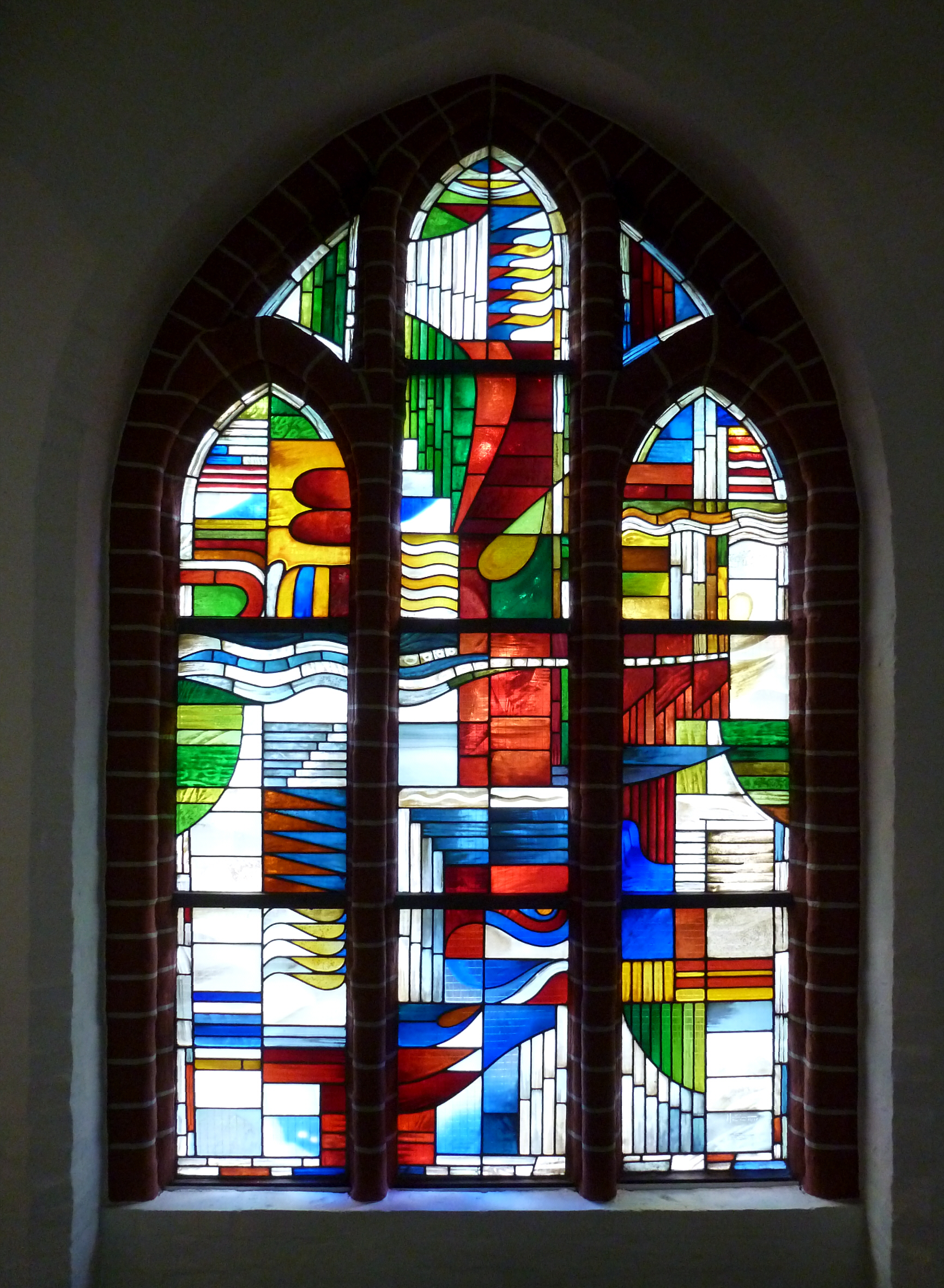
- Lobgesang (Song of praise) after Psalm 145 at Johanniskirche, Lüneburg
- Other name: Psalm 144 (Vulgate); "Exaltabo te Deus meus rex"
- Language: Hebrew (original)

Psalm 145
- ← Psalm 144 Psalm 146 →
- Book: Book of Psalms
- Hebrew Bible part: Ketuvim
- Order in the Hebrew part: 1
- Category: Sifrei Emet
- Christian Bible part: Old Testament
- Order in the Christian part: 19

Psalm 145 is the 145th psalm of the Book of Psalms, generally known in English by its first verse, in the King James Version, "I will extol thee, my God, O king; and I will bless thy name for ever and ever". In Latin, it is known as "Exaltabo te Deus meus rex". It is the last psalm in the final Davidic collection of psalms, comprising Psalms 138 to 145, which are specifically attributed to David in their opening verses.

In the slightly different numbering system used in the Greek Septuagint version of the Bible, and in the Latin Vulgate, this psalm is Psalm 144. The psalm is a hymn psalm.

The psalm forms a regular part of Jewish, Catholic, Lutheran, Anglican and other Protestant liturgies. It has often been set to music, notably by Antonín Dvořák who set several verses in Czech in his Biblical Songs.

== Background and themes ==
This is the only psalm which identifies itself as a תְּהִלָה (tehillah) – as a psalm (namely, a hymn of praise). The version in the Dead Sea Scrolls instead describes itself as a "prayer" although it does not contain any request.

Psalm 145 is an alphabetic acrostic, the initial letter of each verse being the Hebrew alphabet in sequence. For this purpose, the usual Hebrew numbering of verse 1, which begins with the title, "A Psalm of David", is ignored in favor of the non-Hebrew numbering which treats verse 1 as beginning ארוממך (Aromimkha, "I will exalt You").

The Dead Sea Scrolls version also ends each verse with the recurring (non-canonical) refrain, "Blessed be YHVH and blessed be His name forever and ever" and adds at the end of the Psalm the tag, "This is for a memorial". The Dead Sea Scrolls version also preserves a line beginning with the letter nun.

Psalm 145 is the last Psalm attributed explicitly to David, and also the last of the nine acrostic Psalms in its placement in the Book of Psalms (the acrostic Psalms being Psalms 9, 10, 25, 34, 37, 111, 112, 119 and 145). Methodist writer Joseph Benson notes that the king (David) praises "his king", "termed so by way of eminence: the King of kings, the God by whom kings reign".

O Palmer Roberton writes "The last Psalm has been set in place in preparation for the final crescendo of Praise in the Psalter.", which would be Psalms 146-150.

== Uses ==
=== Judaism ===
- The majority of the prayer Ashrei that is recited thrice daily is Psalm 145 (see the entry for Ashrei for further details on its use in Jewish liturgy).
- Verse 13 is found in the repetition to the Amidah on Rosh Hashanah.
- Verse 16 is found in the final paragraph of Birkat Hamazon. It is also recited while donning the tefillin a after the head tefillin is securely in place.
- Verse 21 is recited by some following Psalm 126 (Shir Hama'alot) preceding Birkat Hamazon.

=== Book of Common Prayer ===
In the Church of England's Book of Common Prayer, this psalm is appointed to be read on the morning of the thirtieth day of the month, as well as at Evensong on Whitsunday.

== Musical settings ==
Czech composer Antonín Dvořák set verses 1–3, 5 and 6 (together with Psalm 144 verse 9) to music in No. 5 of his Biblical Songs (1894). Brian Shamash has recorded one of the most common traditional Jewish melodies for chanting Ashrei.

Giovanni Bernardone, better known as Francis of Assisi, wrote a poem towards the end of his life, in 1225, based on Psalm 145 which Draper adapted to the song "All Creatures of Our God and King" in 1919.

== Text ==
The following table shows the Hebrew text of the Psalm with vowels, alongside the Koine Greek text in the Septuagint and the English translation from the King James Version. Note that the meaning can slightly differ between these versions, as the Septuagint and the Masoretic Text come from different textual traditions. (Note: A 1917 translation directly from Hebrew to English by the Jewish Publication Society can be found here or here, and an 1844 translation directly from the Septuagint by L. C. L. Brenton can be found here. Both translations are in the public domain.) In the Septuagint, this psalm is numbered Psalm 144.

#	Hebrew	English	Greek
1	תְּהִלָּ֗ה לְדָ֫וִ֥ד אֲרוֹמִמְךָ֣ אֱלוֹהַ֣י הַמֶּ֑לֶךְ וַאֲבָרְכָ֥ה שִׁ֝מְךָ֗ לְעוֹלָ֥ם וָעֶֽד׃	(David's Psalm of praise.) I will extol thee, my God, O king; and I will bless thy name for ever and ever.	Αἴνεσις τοῦ Δαυΐδ. - ΥΨΩΣΩ σε, ὁ Θεός μου ὁ βασιλεύς μου, καὶ εὐλογήσω τὸ ὄνομά σου εἰς τὸν αἰῶνα καὶ εἰς τὸν αἰῶνα τοῦ αἰῶνος.
2	בְּכׇל־י֥וֹם אֲבָֽרְכֶ֑ךָּ וַאֲהַֽלְלָ֥ה שִׁ֝מְךָ֗ לְעוֹלָ֥ם וָעֶֽד׃	Every day will I bless thee; and I will praise thy name for ever and ever.	καθ᾿ ἑκάστην ἡμέραν εὐλογήσω σε καὶ αἰνέσω τὸ ὄνομά σου εἰς τὸν αἰῶνα καὶ εἰς τὸν αἰῶνα τοῦ αἰῶνος.
3	גָּ֘ד֤וֹל יְהֹוָ֣ה וּמְהֻלָּ֣ל מְאֹ֑ד וְ֝לִגְדֻלָּת֗וֹ אֵ֣ין חֵֽקֶר׃	Great is the LORD, and greatly to be praised; and his greatness is unsearchable.	μέγας Κύριος καὶ αἰνετὸς σφόδρα, καὶ τῆς μεγαλωσύνης αὐτοῦ οὐκ ἔστι πέρας.
4	דּ֣וֹר לְ֭דוֹר יְשַׁבַּ֣ח מַעֲשֶׂ֑יךָ וּגְב֖וּרֹתֶ֣יךָ יַגִּֽידוּ׃	One generation shall praise thy works to another, and shall declare thy mighty acts.	γενεὰ καὶ γενεὰ ἐπαινέσει τὰ ἔργα σου καὶ τὴν δύναμίν σου ἀπαγγελοῦσι.
5	הֲ֭דַר כְּב֣וֹד הוֹדֶ֑ךָ וְדִבְרֵ֖י נִפְלְאֹתֶ֣יךָ אָשִֽׂיחָה׃	I will speak of the glorious honour of thy majesty, and of thy wondrous works.	τὴν μεγαλοπρέπειαν τῆς δόξης τῆς ἁγιωσύνης σου λαλήσουσι καὶ τὰ θαυμάσιά σου διηγήσονται.
6	וֶעֱז֣וּז נֽוֹרְאֹתֶ֣יךָ יֹאמֵ֑רוּ (וגדלותיך) [וּגְדֻלָּתְךָ֥] אֲסַפְּרֶֽנָּה׃	And men shall speak of the might of thy terrible acts: and I will declare thy greatness.	καὶ τὴν δύναμιν τῶν φοβερῶν σου ἐροῦσι καὶ τὴν μεγαλωσύνην σου διηγήσονται.
7	זֵ֣כֶר רַב־טוּבְךָ֣ יַבִּ֑יעוּ וְצִדְקָתְךָ֥ יְרַנֵּֽנוּ׃	They shall abundantly utter the memory of thy great goodness, and shall sing of thy righteousness.	μνήμην τοῦ πλήθους τῆς χρηστότητός σου ἐξερεύξονται καὶ τῇ δικαιοσύνῃ σου ἀγαλλιάσονται.
8	חַנּ֣וּן וְרַח֣וּם יְהֹוָ֑ה אֶ֥רֶךְ אַ֝פַּ֗יִם וּגְדׇל־חָֽסֶד׃	The LORD is gracious, and full of compassion; slow to anger, and of great mercy.	οἰκτίρμων καὶ ἐλεήμων ὁ Κύριος, μακρόθυμος καὶ πολυέλεος.
9	טוֹב־יְהֹוָ֥ה לַכֹּ֑ל וְ֝רַחֲמָ֗יו עַל־כׇּל־מַעֲשָֽׂיו׃	The LORD is good to all: and his tender mercies are over all his works.	χρηστὸς Κύριος τοῖς σύμπασι, καὶ οἱ οἰκτιρμοὶ αὐτοῦ ἐπὶ πάντα τὰ ἔργα αὐτοῦ.
10	יוֹד֣וּךָ יְ֭הֹוָה כׇּל־מַעֲשֶׂ֑יךָ וַ֝חֲסִידֶ֗יךָ יְבָרְכֽוּכָה׃	All thy works shall praise thee, O LORD; and thy saints shall bless thee.	ἐξομολογησάσθωσάν σοι, Κύριε, πάντα τὰ ἔργα σου, καὶ οἱ ὅσιοί σου εὐλογησάτωσάν σε.
11	כְּב֣וֹד מַלְכוּתְךָ֣ יֹאמֵ֑רוּ וּגְבוּרָתְךָ֥ יְדַבֵּֽרוּ׃	They shall speak of the glory of thy kingdom, and talk of thy power;	δόξαν τῆς βασιλείας σου ἐροῦσι καὶ τὴν δυναστείαν σου λαλήσουσι
12	לְהוֹדִ֤יעַ ׀ לִבְנֵ֣י הָ֭אָדָם גְּבוּרֹתָ֑יו וּ֝כְב֗וֹד הֲדַ֣ר מַלְכוּתֽוֹ׃	To make known to the sons of men his mighty acts, and the glorious majesty of his kingdom.	τοῦ γνωρίσαι τοῖς υἱοῖς τῶν ἀνθρώπων τὴν δυναστείαν σου καὶ τὴν δόξαν τῆς μεγαλοπρεπείας τῆς βασιλείας σου.
13	מַֽלְכוּתְךָ֗ מַלְכ֥וּת כׇּל־עֹלָמִ֑ים וּ֝מֶֽמְשַׁלְתְּךָ֗ בְּכׇל־דּ֥וֹר וָדֹֽר׃	Thy kingdom is an everlasting kingdom, and thy dominion endureth throughout all generations.	ἡ βασιλεία σου βασιλεία πάντων τῶν αἰώνων, καὶ ἡ δεσποτεία σου ἐν πάσῃ γενεᾷ καὶ γενεᾷ. 13α πιστὸς Κύριος ἐν πᾶσι τοῖς λόγοις αὐτοῦ καὶ ὅσιος ἐν πᾶσι τοῖς ἔργοις αὐτοῦ.
14	סוֹמֵ֣ךְ יְ֭הֹוָה לְכׇל־הַנֹּפְלִ֑ים וְ֝זוֹקֵ֗ף לְכׇל־הַכְּפוּפִֽים׃	The LORD upholdeth all that fall, and raiseth up all those that be bowed down.	ὑποστηρίζει Κύριος πάντας τοὺς καταπίπτοντας καὶ ἀνορθοῖ πάντας τοὺς κατερραγμένους.
15	עֵֽינֵי־כֹ֭ל אֵלֶ֣יךָ יְשַׂבֵּ֑רוּ וְאַתָּ֤ה נֽוֹתֵן־לָהֶ֖ם אֶת־אׇכְלָ֣ם בְּעִתּֽוֹ׃	The eyes of all wait upon thee; and thou givest them their meat in due season.	οἱ ὀφθαλμοὶ πάντων εἰς σὲ ἐλπίζουσι, καὶ σὺ δίδως τὴν τροφὴν αὐτῶν ἐν εὐκαιρίᾳ.
16	פּוֹתֵ֥חַ אֶת־יָדֶ֑ךָ וּמַשְׂבִּ֖יעַ לְכׇל־חַ֣י רָצֽוֹן׃	Thou openest thine hand, and satisfiest the desire of every living thing.	ἀνοίγεις σὺ τὰς χεῖράς σου καὶ ἐμπιπλᾷς πᾶν ζῷον εὐδοκίας.
17	צַדִּ֣יק יְ֭הֹוָה בְּכׇל־דְּרָכָ֑יו וְ֝חָסִ֗יד בְּכׇל־מַעֲשָֽׂיו׃	The LORD is righteous in all his ways, and holy in all his works.	δίκαιος Κύριος ἐν πάσαις ταῖς ὁδοῖς αὐτοῦ καὶ ὅσιος ἐν πᾶσι τοῖς ἔργοις αὐτοῦ.
18	קָר֣וֹב יְ֭הֹוָה לְכׇל־קֹרְאָ֑יו לְכֹ֤ל אֲשֶׁ֖ר יִקְרָאֻ֣הוּ בֶֽאֱמֶֽת׃	The LORD is nigh unto all them that call upon him, to all that call upon him in truth.	ἐγγὺς Κύριος πᾶσι τοῖς ἐπικαλουμένοις αὐτόν, πᾶσι τοῖς ἐπικαλουμένοις αὐτὸν ἐν ἀληθείᾳ.
19	רְצוֹן־יְרֵאָ֥יו יַעֲשֶׂ֑ה וְֽאֶת־שַׁוְעָתָ֥ם יִ֝שְׁמַ֗ע וְיוֹשִׁיעֵֽם׃	He will fulfil the desire of them that fear him: he also will hear their cry, and will save them.	θέλημα τῶν φοβουμένων αὐτὸν ποιήσει καὶ τῆς δεήσεως αὐτῶν εἰσακούσεται καὶ σώσει αὐτούς.
20	שׁוֹמֵ֣ר יְ֭הֹוָה אֶת־כׇּל־אֹהֲבָ֑יו וְאֵ֖ת כׇּל־הָרְשָׁעִ֣ים יַשְׁמִֽיד׃	The LORD preserveth all them that love him: but all the wicked will he destroy.	φυλάσσει Κύριος πάντας τοὺς ἀγαπῶντας αὐτὸν καὶ πάντας τοὺς ἁμαρτωλοὺς ἐξολοθρεύσει.
21	תְּהִלַּ֥ת יְהֹוָ֗ה יְֽדַבֶּ֫ר־פִּ֥י וִיבָרֵ֣ךְ כׇּל־בָּ֭שָׂר שֵׁ֥ם קׇדְשׁ֗וֹ לְעוֹלָ֥ם וָעֶֽד׃	My mouth shall speak the praise of the LORD: and let all flesh bless his holy name for ever and ever.	αἴνεσιν Κυρίου λαλήσει τὸ στόμα μου· καὶ εὐλογείτω πᾶσα σὰρξ τὸ ὄνομα τὸ ἅγιον αὐτοῦ εἰς τὸν αἰῶνα καὶ εἰς τὸν αἰῶνα τοῦ αἰῶνος.

=== The "missing verse" ===
Being an alphabetic acrostic psalm, (Note: There are seven psalms written in Hebrew alphabetical order: Psalm 25, 34, 37, 111, 112, 119 and 145.) the initial letter of each verse in Psalm 145 should be the Hebrew alphabet in sequence, but in the Masoretic Text there is no verse beginning with the letter nun (נ), which would come between verses 13 and 14. A very common supposition is that there had been such a verse but it was omitted by a copyist's error. If so, that error must have occurred very early. By the 3rd century C.E., Rabbi Johanan Ha-Nappah is quoted in the Talmud (Berakhot 4b) as asking why is there no verse in Psalm 145 beginning with nun, and the explanation is given (presumably by the same Rabbi Johanan) that the word "fallen" (נפלה, nawfla) begins with nun, as in the verse of Amos 5:2 ("Fallen is the Maiden of Israel, she shall arise nevermore"), and thus it is incompatible with the uplifting and universal theme of the Psalm. Since verse 14, the samech verse, contains the word "נֹּפְלִ֑ים" (the fallen), the Talmud conjectures that King David foresaw the destruction ("fall") of Israel and omitted a verse starting with nun, while nevertheless hinting to it in the next verse (cf. the pattern of verse 12, ending with "מַלְכוּתֽוֹ" (His kingship), and verse 13, starting with "מַֽלְכוּתְךָ֗" (Your kingship)). The explanation may not satisfy modern readers (it did not satisfy Rabbi David Kimhi of the 13th century), but it demonstrates that the absence of a verse beginning with that letter was noticed and was undisputed even in antiquity.

However, the Septuagint, the Latin Vulgate (which is largely based on the Septuagint), the Syriac Peshitta, and the Dead Sea Scrolls (11QPs-ɑ; which shows some affinity with the Septuagint, e.g., the inclusion of a 151st Psalm) all provide a verse at this point which commences (in Hebrew) with nun—נֶאֱמָן

"Faithful is God in His sayings, and Honest in all His works"
"נאמן אלוהים בדבריו וחסיד בכל מעשיו".

New Revised Standard Version

Your kingdom is an everlasting kingdom,

and your dominion endures throughout all generations.

The Lord is faithful in all his words,

and gracious in all his deeds.

This verse is now inserted at the end of verse 13 (sometimes numbered "verse 13b") in several Christian versions of the Bible including the New Revised Standard, the New American, the Today's English Version, the Moffat, and others. (Note: Some versions place the addition in a footnote, such as NKJV. Quotation: "So with MT, Tg.; DSS, LXX, Syr., Vg. add The Lord is faithful in all His words, And holy in all His works") However, not everyone is convinced that this nun verse is authentic. It is, except for the first word, identical to verse 17 (צ) ("Righteous is YHVH in all His ways…"), and thus, as Kimelman argues, may have been a post-facto attempt to "cure" the apparent deficiency. These ancient versions all have other departures from the traditional Hebrew text which make them imperfect evidence of the original text; for example, the Dead Sea Scrolls version ends every verse in Psalm 145 with "Blessed be YHVH and blessed is His name forever and ever". And no such nun verse is found in other important ancient translations from the Hebrew — the Aramaic Targum, the Greek versions of Aquila, Symmachus, and Theodotion — nor is such a verse quoted anywhere in the Talmud. Additionally, there are other alphabetic acrostics in the Book of Psalms — specifically Psalms 25 and 34 — that also imperfectly follow the alphabet. It is plausible that a nun verse was not part of the original text.
