= Lo! He comes with clouds descending =

1758 Christian hymn by Charles Wesley

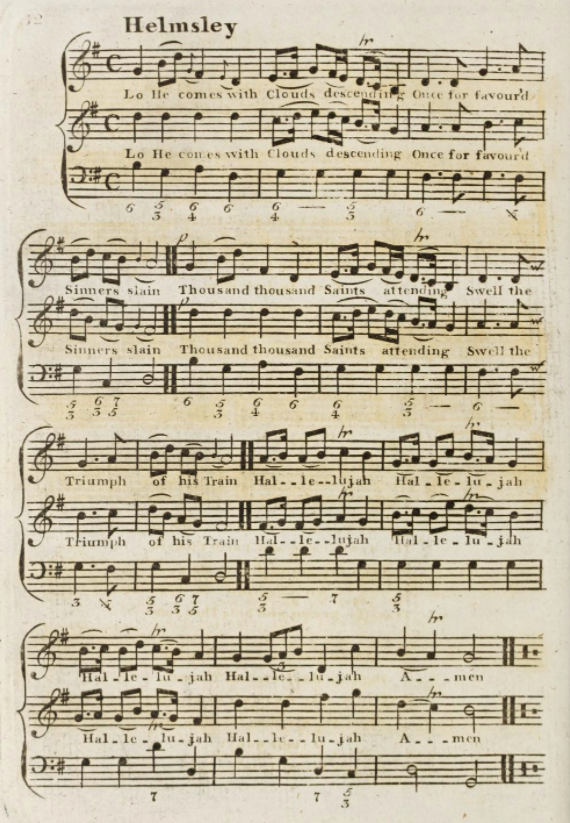
- Genre: Hymn
- Written: 1758
- Text: John Cennick, Charles Wesley
- Based on: Revelation 1:7
- Meter: 8.7.8.7.4.7
- Melody: "Helmsley" by Thomas Olivers, "Regent Square" by Henry Smart

"Lo! He comes with clouds descending" is a Christian hymn by Charles Wesley (1707–1788), based on an earlier hymn, "Lo! He cometh, countless Trumpets" by John Cennick (1718–1755). Most commonly sung at Advent, the hymn derives its theological content from the Book of Revelation relating imagery of the Day of Judgment. Considered one of the "Great Four Anglican Hymns" in the 19th century, it is most commonly sung to the tune Helmsley, first published in 1763.

== Text ==
The text has its origins in a hymn "Lo! He cometh, countless Trumpets" by John Cennick published in his Collection of Sacred Hymns of 1752. This was substantially revised by Charles Wesley for publication in Hymns of intercession for all mankind of 1758. Some hymnals present a combination of the two texts. The content of the text and particularly the title are derived from Revelation chapter 1, verse 7, which tells of the Second Coming of Jesus Christ.

In the 19th century it was considered one of the 'Great Four Anglican Hymns' on the basis of a survey Anglican Hymnology published by the Rev. James King in 1885. King surveyed 52 hymnals from the member churches of the Anglican Communion around the world and found that 51 of them included this hymn (alongside "All Praise to Thee, my God, this Night", "Hark! The Herald Angels Sing" and "Rock of Ages").

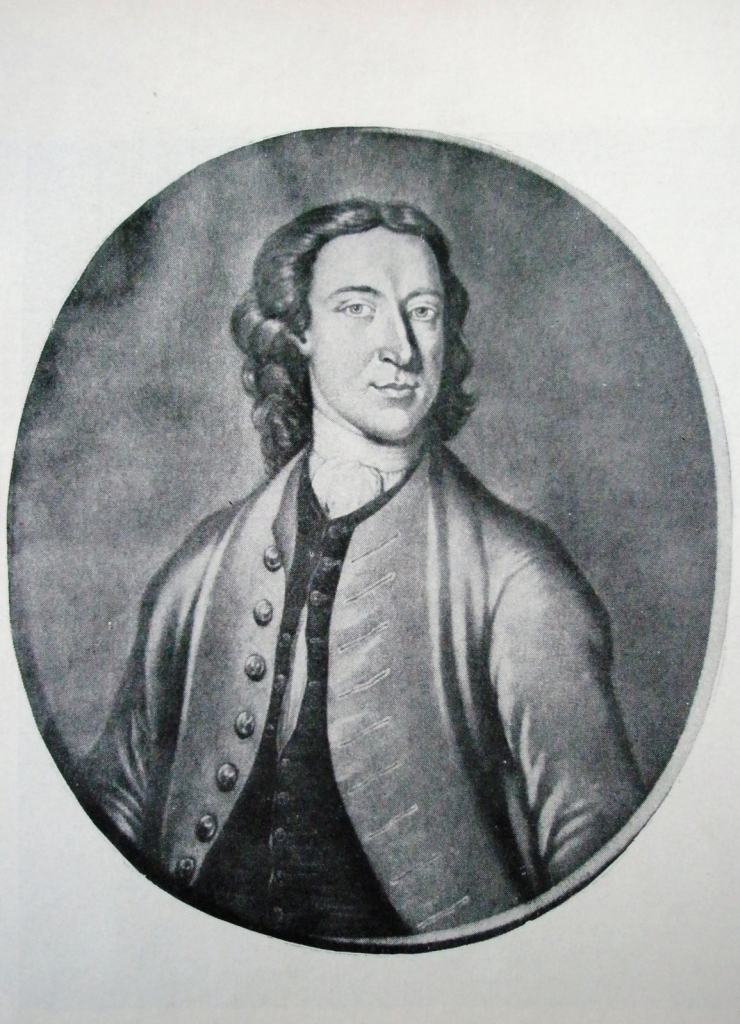
John Cennick

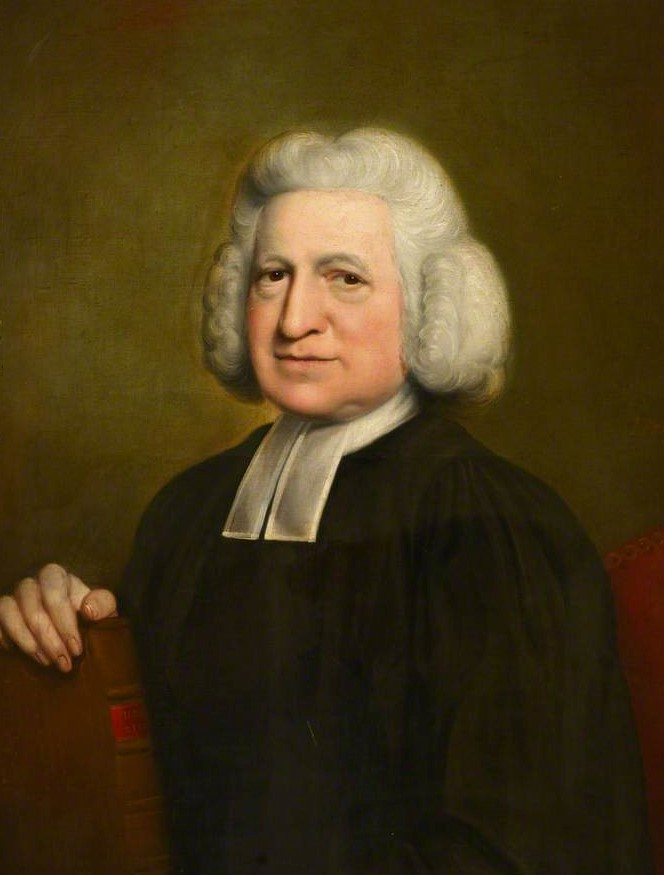
Charles Wesley

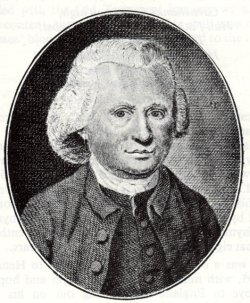
Thomas Olivers

=== Antisemitism allegations ===
The second verse has been criticised for its antisemitic overtones. In Wesley's original wording, "Those who set at nought and sold him", the pronoun 'those' is traditionally understood as referring to the Jews, thus perpetuating the notion of collective Jewish responsibility for the death of Christ. The description of those who gave him [Jesus] the "glorious scars" as "deeply wailing" may reinforce this interpretation, echoing apocalyptic imagery of Israel mourning its rejected Messiah; however other academics, such as Linda Woodhead, question this interpretation.

== Tunes ==
=== Helmsley ===
The hymn tune "Helmsley" is usually attributed to Thomas Olivers, a Welsh Methodist preacher and hymn-writer. Anecdotal stories about the tune's composition suggest Olivers heard the tune whistled in the street and derived his melody from that; the most likely source is an Irish concert song "Guardian angels, now protect me". George Arthur Crawford, in A Dictionary of Music and Musicians (1900), discusses the origin:

This tune claims a notice on account of the various opinions that have been expressed respecting its origin. The story runs that Thomas Olivers, the friend of John Wesley, was attracted by a tune which he heard whistled in the street, and that from it he formed the melody to which were adapted the words of Cennick and Wesley's Advent hymn...The source from whence 'Olivers' was derived seems to have been a concert-room song commencing 'Guardian angels, now protect me,' the music of which probably originated in Dublin.

The tune of "Guardian Angels" is as follows:

The hymn-tune melody "Helmsley" derived from this tune first appeared in the second edition of Wesley's Select Hymns with Tunes annexed of 1765 under the name of "Olivers":

Crawford disproves the suggestion that the tune is based on a hornpipe from the burlesque Golden Pippin of c. 1771, noting the chronology makes it likely that the hornpipe was based on the hymn tune, or at least derived from the shared source "Guardian angels". In some publications, the tune is attributed to Thomas Arne on account of a similarity to an air (possibly "Auspicious spirits guard my love") from Arne's chamber opera Thomas and Sally of 1760, but the resemblance is slight and the date of that opera make this unlikely.

By 1763, the text appeared in print paired with the text "Lo! He comes with clouds descending" in Martin Madan's Collection of Psalm and Hymn Tunes sung at Lock Hospital of 1763. Madan's version is a combination mostly comprising Wesley's text, but substituting some of Cennick's verses. This presents the tune in a familiar form with only a few stylistic variations compared to the modern tune:

=== Other associated tunes ===
The hymn is occasionally printed and sung with other tunes in hymnbooks including "St Thomas", "Regent Square", "Westminster Abbey", "Kensington New" and "Cum Nubibus". The 1982 Lutheran Worship hymnal sets it to the considerably more sombre tune "Picardy".

Brooke Foss Westcott, Bishop of Durham, recalled in 1901 that Queen Victoria was displeased after an organist played a different tune at St George's Chapel, Windsor Castle, and requested only Helmsley in future.
