= Sidus =

Sidus may refer to:

- Sidus (Corinthia), a village of ancient Corinthia
- Sidus (Ionia), a town of ancient Ionia
- SidusHQ, South Korean talent management agency
- Sidus Pictures, South Korean film production and distribution company

== See also ==
- Sidera (disambiguation); "sidera" is the plural for the Latin "sidus"
