= Scottish Psalter =

Scottish Psalter may refer to:

- Scottish Psalter (1564), the first Scottish Psalter published in 1564.
- Scots Metrical Psalter of 1650. See Hymnbooks of the Church of Scotland.
