= England's Lane =

England’s Lane may refer to:

- England’s Lane (hymn tune), a hymn tune by English composer Geoffrey Turton Shaw (1879–1943)
- England's Lane (Peter Sarstedt album), a 1997 album by Peter Sarstedt
- England's Lane (street in Belsize Park, London NW3)
- England's Lane (cafeteria, 2 England's Lane, London, NW3 4TG)
