= Sidera =

Sidera can be:

== Sidera ==
- Sidera, a genus of fungi
- Seleucia Sidera, ancient city in the northern part of Pisidia, Anatolia
- Cosmica Sidera, initial name for Galilean moons
- Sidera Lodoicea, name given by the astronomer Giovanni Domenico Cassini to the four moons of Saturn
- Quem terra, pontus, sidera, ancient hymn in honour of the Blessed Virgin
- Sidera, a neighbourhood in Chalandri
- Sidera Networks, U.S. telecom company

== Sideras ==
- Loukas Sideras, drummer of the Greek progressive rock band Aphrodite's Child
- Sideras, a village in Greece

== See also ==
- Sidus (disambiguation); "sidus" is the singular for the Latin "sidera"
