= For the beauty of the earth (Rutter) =

Choral composition by John Rutter, a setting of the hymn

- Anthem by John Rutter
- Written: 1864
- Text: "For the Beauty of the Earth"
- Language: English
- Composed: 1978
- Dedication: Rosemary Heffley and the Texas Choral Directors Association
- Published: 1980
- Scoring: SATB (or SA or TTBB) with keyboard or orchestra

"For the beauty of the earth" is a sacred choral composition by John Rutter, a setting of the hymn of the same name by Folliott S. Pierpoint. The work was published by Oxford University Press in 1980. Recorded several times, it has been described as "one of Rutter's more popular, enduring anthems".

== History ==
Rutter set the stanzas 1, 2, 4, and 5 of the 1864 hymn "For the Beauty of the Earth" by Folliott Sandford Pierpoint. Pierpoint had written eight stanzas as a hymn for the Eucharist with a refrain addressing "Christ, our God". It appeared in his hymnal Lyrica Eucharistica, The Hymnal Noted, entitled "The Sacrifice of Praise". The poet wrote about his experience of feeling blessed some day when he looked at the countryside near Bath, England, reflecting the beauty of the earth, of "each hour of the day and of the night", and of "the joy of human love". The hymn was combined in hymnals with the hymn tune "Dix". It was first used as a communion hymn, but soon became a favorite for the Thanksgiving season. Rutter, as others before him, changed the refrain to addressing the "Lord of all" (instead of "Christ, our God"), giving it a more general meaning of thanks and praise for the Creation.

Rutter composed the anthem in 1978. He dedicated the composition to Rosemary Heffley and the Texas Choral Directors Association. Heffley was a choral conductor and music pedagogue, in the 1970s teaching at Mesquite High School, and around 1980 the association's director. The anthem was published by Oxford University Press in 1980, in a version for mixed choir SATB and one for two-part children's choir, with accompaniment by keyboard or a small orchestra.

== Music ==
The piece is set in 2/2, begins in B-flat major and is marked to be sung "Happily". It begins with eight measures of instrumental introduction, with broken chords in constantly flowing eighth-notes in an obbligato flute and harp, accompanied by strings. The sopranos alone enter, singing a long lyric melody. The melody follows the text, first upward, reaching the key note on "earth"; it culminates in the refrain on "Lord of all, to thee we raise", illustrating the raising, and renders the final line "this our joyful hymn – of praise" with a soft descent in syncopes. In the choral version, the men's voices enter in unison in the second verse. In the third verse, focused on human relationships, the men sing the melody with the women adding a descant melody. In the final verse, the melody is given to the altos, with a high counterpoint in sopranos and violin. A reviewer noted Rutter's gift for composing melodies that are singable by lay singers and children, and that he "writes for enjoyment ... He gives them sufficient challenge, specially in keeping the rhythms neat and lively". He noted Rutter's characteristics as "lingering around a nostalgic third or fifth of the scale, exercising a catchy phrase in sequences, introducing a little groovy syncopation".

== Recordings and performances ==
For the beauty of the earth was first recorded in 1983, with the composer conducting the Cambridge Singers and the City of London Sinfonia in a collection Be Thou My Vision: Sacred Music by John Rutter. It was featured in several other collections of music by Rutter, including the 2012 John Rutter Christmas Album, and chosen to begin the second part, of other music.

The anthem was recorded in 1996 by the boys' choir of St Paul's Cathedral in London and City of London Sinfonia, conducted by John Scott for a collection of sacred choral music entitled How can I keep from singing?. In 1991, Donald Pearson conducted in Denver by the choirs of St. John's Episcopal Cathedral, accompanied by organist Eric Plutz and Tom Blomster (glockenspiel). The Australian Gondwana Voices included the song in their 2003 album New Light New Hope of music by mostly living composers, with pianist Sally Whitwell and conducted by Mark O'Leary. The anthem was included in a 2008 recording of 20th century music for children, performed by the New London Children's Choir with pianist Alexander Wells, conducted by Ronald Corp.
