= Hark! The Herald Angels Sing =

English Christmas carol

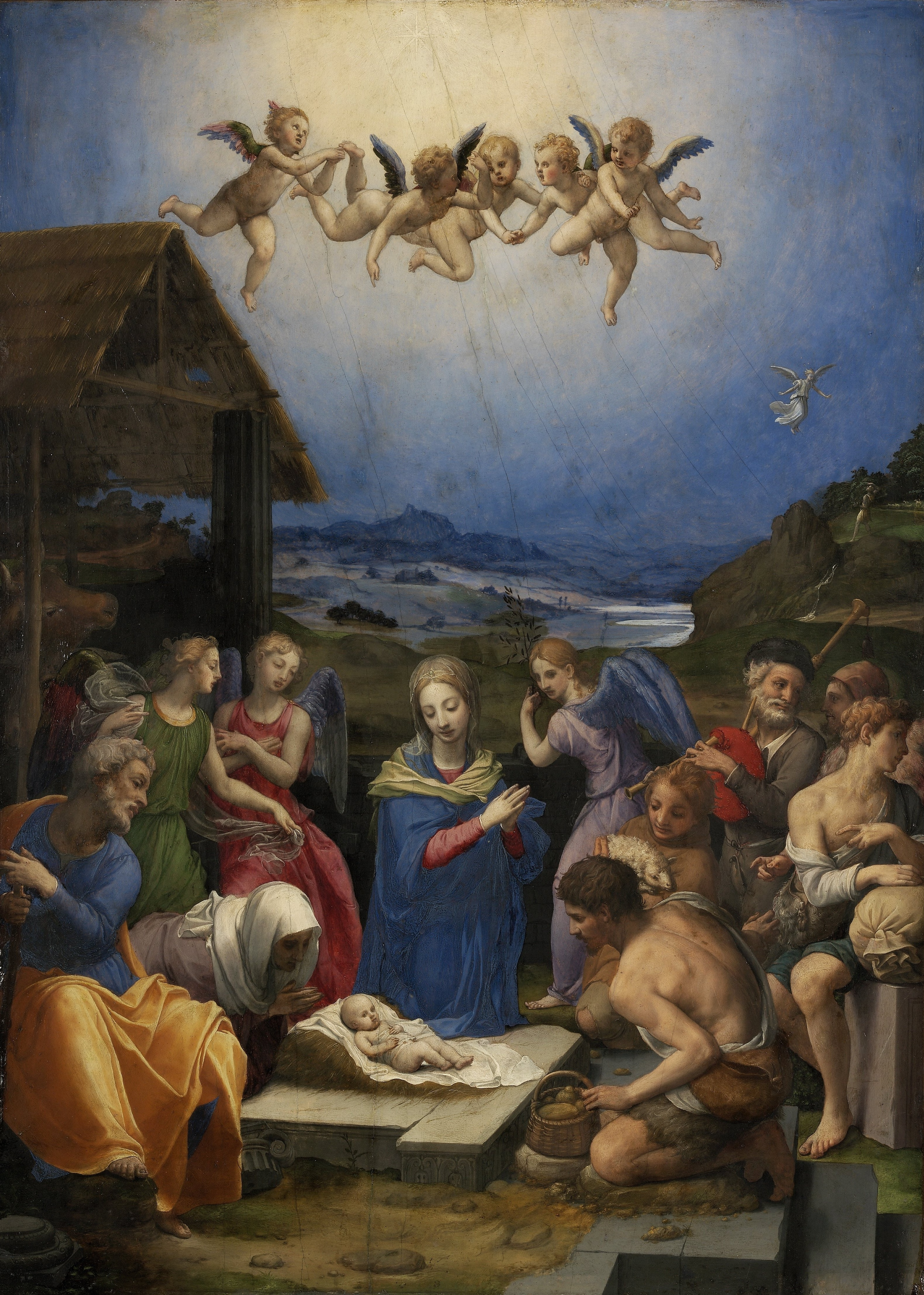
- Worship of the Shepherds, 1539, by Bronzino
- Genre: Christmas carol
- Written: 1739
- Text: Charles Wesley
- Based on: Luke 2:8–14
- Meter: 7.7.7.7 D with refrain
- Melody: "Vaterland, in deinen Gauen" from Festgesang by Felix Mendelssohn, adapted by William H. Cummings

"Hark! The Herald Angels Sing" is an English Christmas carol authored by Charles Wesley in 1739. The carol, based on Luke 2:8–14, describes an angelic chorus singing of Christ's nativity.

Wesley's version, entitled "Hymn for Christmas-Day", consisted of ten four-line verses. The version most commonly sung today includes six of these, arranged into three eight-line verses, with a refrain. The modern text incorporates revisions made by a number of authors, among them George Whitefield, who altered the opening couplet from "Hark how all the welkin rings / Glory to the King of Kings" to the familiar "Hark! the herald angels sing / Glory to the newborn King".

Various settings have been used for the carol. Since the mid-19th century, it has usually been sung to a melody from Felix Mendelssohn's Festgesang zum Gutenbergfest (1840), originally composed for the 400th anniversary of the invention of the printing press.

== Textual history ==
"Hymn for Christmas-Day" first appeared in Hymns and Sacred Poems (1739), compiled by Charles Wesley and his brother John. George Whitefield, who, like the Wesleys, was an early leader of the Methodist movement, subsequently included it in his Collection of Hymns for Social Worship (1753). Whitefield omitted the eighth and tenth verses and made various revisions to the remaining ones, chief of which was the alteration of the opening couplet. Whitefield's version was included in Martin Madan's Collection of Psalms and Hymns (1760) with another significant change, namely the alteration of the end of verse two to "With th' angelic host proclaim / Christ is born in Bethlehem".

The carol made its first appearance in an Anglican publication in 1782, when it was included in a supplement to Tate and Brady's New Version of the Psalms of David. The New Version and its supplement were bound up with all copies of the Book of Common Prayer, which enabled the carol to diffuse widely, becoming one of the "great four" Anglican hymns. A final change occurred when it was added to Hymns Ancient and Modern (1861), namely the alteration of the end of verse four to "Pleased as man with man to dwell / Jesus, our Emmanuel".

"Hymn for Christmas-Day" (Charles Wesley, 1739)	Adaptation by George Whitefield (1753)	Hymns Ancient and Modern (1861)
Hark how all the Welkin rings "Glory to the King of Kings, "Peace on Earth, and Mercy mild, "God and Sinners reconcil'd!	Hark! the Herald Angels sing Glory to the new-born King! Peace on Earth and Mercy mild, God and Sinners reconcil'd.	Hark! the herald-angels sing Glory to the new-born King, Peace on earth, and mercy mild, God and sinners reconciled. Joyful, all ye nations, rise, Join the triumph of the skies; With the angelic host proclaim Christ is born in Bethlehem. Hark! the herald-angels sing Glory to the new-born King.
Joyful all ye Nations rise, Join the Triumph of the Skies, Universal Nature say "Christ the Lord is born to Day!	Joyful all ye Nations rise, Join the Triumphs of the Skies; Nature rise and worship him, Who is born at Bethlehem.	Hark! the herald-angels sing Glory to the new-born King, Peace on earth, and mercy mild, God and sinners reconciled. Joyful, all ye nations, rise, Join the triumph of the skies; With the angelic host proclaim Christ is born in Bethlehem. Hark! the herald-angels sing Glory to the new-born King.
Christ, by highest Heav'n ador'd, Christ, the Everlasting Lord, Late in Time behold him come, Offspring of a Virgin's Womb.	Christ by highest Heav'n ador'd, Christ the everlasting Lord; Late in Time behold him come, Offspring of the Virgin's Womb.	Christ, by highest heaven adored, Christ, the Everlasting Lord, Late in time behold Him come, Offspring of a Virgin's womb. Veiled in flesh the Godhead see Hail, the Incarnate Deity! Pleased as Man with man to dwell, Jesus, our Emmanuel. Hark! the herald-angels sing Glory to the new-born King.
Veil'd in Flesh, the Godhead see, Hail th' Incarnate Deity! Pleas'd as Man with Men t' appear Jesus, our Immanuel here!	Veil'd in Flesh the Godhead see, Hail the incarnate Deity! Pleas'd as Man with Men t'appear, Jesus our Emmanuel here.	Christ, by highest heaven adored, Christ, the Everlasting Lord, Late in time behold Him come, Offspring of a Virgin's womb. Veiled in flesh the Godhead see Hail, the Incarnate Deity! Pleased as Man with man to dwell, Jesus, our Emmanuel. Hark! the herald-angels sing Glory to the new-born King.
Hail the Heav'nly Prince of Peace! Hail the Sun of Righteousness! Light and Life to All he brings, Ris'n with Healing in his Wings.	Hail the Heav'n born Prince of Peace! Hail the Sun of Righteousness! Light and Life around he brings, Ris'n with Healing in his Wings.	Hail, the heaven-born Prince of Peace! Hail, the Sun of Righteousness! (Note: This line is a reference to Malachi 4:2 ("But unto you that fear my name shall the Sun of righteousness arise with healing in his wings"), but is often mistakenly changed to "Son of righteousness".); Light and Life to all He brings, Risen with healing in His wings. Mild He lays His glory by, Born that man no more may die, Born to raise the sons of earth, Born to give them second birth. Hark! the herald-angels sing Glory to the new-born King.
Mild he lays his Glory by, Born—that Man no more may die, Born—to raise the Sons of Earth, Born—to give them Second Birth.	Mild he lays his Glory by, Born that Men no more may die: Born to raise the sons of Earth, Born to give them second Birth.	Hail, the heaven-born Prince of Peace! Hail, the Sun of Righteousness! Light and Life to all He brings, Risen with healing in His wings. Mild He lays His glory by, Born that man no more may die, Born to raise the sons of earth, Born to give them second birth. Hark! the herald-angels sing Glory to the new-born King.
Come, Desire of Nations, come, Fix in Us thy humble Home, Rise, the Woman's Conqu'ring Seed, Bruise in Us the Serpent's Head.	Come Desire of Nations, come Fix in us thy heav'nly Home; Rise the Woman's conqu'ring Seed, Bruise in us the Serpent's Head.	
Now display thy saving Pow'r, Ruin'd Nature now restore, Now in Mystic Union join Thine to Ours, and Ours to Thine.		
Adam's Likeness, Lord, efface, Stamp thy Image in its Place, Second Adam from above, Reinstate us in thy Love.	Adam's Likeness now efface, Stamp thy Image in its Place; Second Adam from above, Work it in us by thy Love.	
Let us Thee, tho' lost, regain, Thee, the Life, the Inner Man: O! to All Thyself impart, Form'd in each Believing Heart.		

== Melodies ==
=== Mendelssohn melody ===
Sung by the United States Army Band Chorus

In 1855, British musician William Hayman Cummings, organist at Waltham Abbey Church, adapted a movement from Felix Mendelssohn's secular Festgesang to fit the lyrics of "Hark! The Herald Angels Sing". Wesley had originally envisioned the words being sung to the same tune as his Easter hymn "Christ the Lord Is Risen Today".

In Britain, the carol is popularly performed in an arrangement that retains Cummings' original harmonisation of the Mendelssohn tune for the first two verses, but adds a soprano descant and a last verse harmonisation for the organ in verse three, by Sir David Willcocks. This arrangement was first published in 1961 by Oxford University Press in the first book of the Carols for Choirs series. For many years it has served as the recessional hymn of the annual Festival of Nine Lessons and Carols at King's College Chapel, Cambridge.

=== Handel melody ===
Handel's tune in Judas Maccabaeus

An uncommon arrangement of the hymn to the tune "See, the Conqu'ring hero comes" from Handel's Judas Maccabaeus, normally associated with the hymn "Thine Be the Glory", is traditionally used as the recessional hymn of the Festival of Nine Lessons and Carols at St Patrick's Cathedral, Dublin. This is broadcast live each year on Christmas Eve on RTÉ Radio 1. The usual three verses are divided into six, each with a refrain. The arrangement features a brass fanfare with drums in addition to the cathedral organ, and takes about seven and a half minutes to sing.

The Victorian organist W. H. Jude, in his day a popular composer, also composed a new setting of the work, published in his Music and the Higher Life.

== In popular culture ==
A popular carol, appearances of "Hark! The Herald Angels Sing" in popular culture include:

- A Charlie Brown Christmas – sung by the children's choir in the closing scene, one of the most famous uses of the hymn in popular culture.
- The Muppet Christmas Carol – featured as part of the film's Christmas music and atmosphere.
- South Park – in the episode "Merry Christmas, Charlie Manson!", the song is used in a parody of the closing choir scene from A Charlie Brown Christmas.

== See also ==
- List of Christmas carols

== Footnotes ==
Notes

Citations
