= Hymnbooks of the Church of Scotland =

Christian song books

Decisions concerning the conduct of public worship in the Church of Scotland are entirely at the discretion of the parish minister. As a result, a wide variety of musical resources are used. However, at various times in its history, the General Assembly has commissioned volumes of psalms and hymns for use by congregations.

== Scottish Psalter (1564) ==
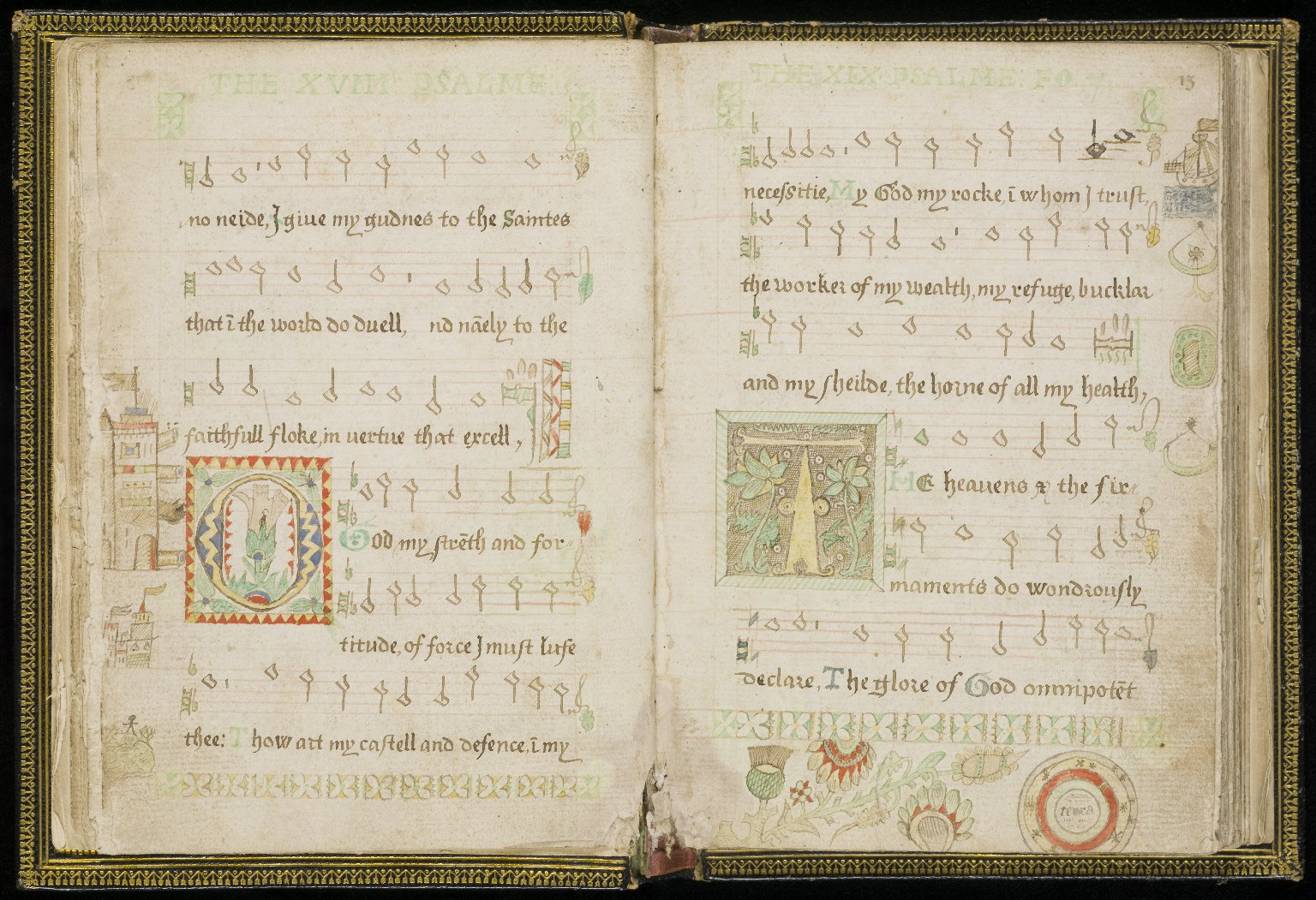
Psalm 118 in the 1564 Scottish Metrical Psalter

The Scottish Psalter of 1564 was based on the first Anglo-Genevan Psalter which had been used by John Knox's congregation. The Scottish Psalter contained most of the tunes of the Anglo-Genevan Psalter and it was completed on the same principles to contain all 150 psalms. Neither of these included hymns. The text of this Psalter expresses the spirit of the original without undue pains to render the text literally. While only the melodies of the tunes were printed, part singing was certainly known, as there is a record of a four-part rendition of Psalm 124 being sung to welcome John Durie back to Edinburgh from exile in 1582. There were 30 metres in all: ninety-eight psalms were set to common metre, 10 to long metre, 6 to short metre and 4 to long metre (6 lines), and there were 26 metres for the other 32 psalms. Some editions of this Psalter printed in 1575 or later included up to 10 other pieces, but these were probably only intended for devotional purposes. Duguid has shown that the Scottish General Assembly closely guarded psalm publishing and had previously disciplined printers for editing the psalms (as had also been done in Calvin's Geneva).

The 1564 edition went through many changes that culminated with the 1635 version. Edited by Edward Millar, the 1635 Scottish Psalter included the very best of the psalm settings for the Sternhold and Hopkins psalms. This included four-part homophonic settings of many of the psalms (those texts that did not have a proper melody were assigned a melody from another psalm), several more complicated or polyphonic psalm settings (also known as Psalms in Reports), and settings of many of the so-called Common Tunes that had come to be used in the seventeenth century.

== Scots Metrical Psalter (1650) ==
The last edition of the 1564 psalter with music was issued in 1640. However, there had been many attempts to supplant the 1564 edition, including those by none other than James VI/I. Even so, Scots clung to their beloved psalter until the Westminster assembly promised a potential union between the English and Scottish psalters. A complete psalter by Francis Rous, an English member of Parliament, was revised by the Westminster Assembly but did not satisfy the Scots. Over a period of 2 years and 4 months it was revised by direction of the General Assembly, and it has been calculated that about 40% of the lines are original to the Scottish revisors with only 10% from Rous and 30% from the Westminster Version. Accuracy of translation was in the forefront. This psalter continues in use until the present day in parts of Scotland (especially the Highlands), and around the world in some of the smaller Presbyterian denominations.

W. P. Rorison carried out a detailed comparison of the 1650 version with ten earlier psalters to trace every line. He was able to trace 4,846 lines to these ten sources.

Psalter	Lines	Percentage
1564 Scottish version	338	4%
Henry Dod (1620)	266	3%
King James (1631–1636)	516	6%
George Wither (1632)	52	0.5%
Sir William Mure of Rowallan	49	0.5%
The Bay Psalm Book (1640)	269	3%
William Barton (1644)	136	2%
Zachary Boyd (1644–1648)	754	9%
Francis Rous (1638–1646)	878	10%
Westminster version (1647)	1,588	18%
presumably original	3,774	44%

In 1929, the music of the psalter was revised by the Church of Scotland to bring its harmonies into line with those in the revision of the hymnal. The psalter was usually printed at the front of the first two editions of the hymnal (1898, 1927), and throughout much of the 20th century there was a widespread tradition of beginning worship with a psalm before continuing in the hymn books. However, the most widely used version of the third edition did not have the psalter in the same volume, with the result that the full psalter has disappeared from the majority of Church of Scotland congregations.

The psalter contained all 150 psalms in their entirety, though obviously many of them were too long to be sung whole. In 1781 a selection of 67 paraphrases of Scripture was given permissive use for a year. Although never officially adopted, the paraphrases had significant use in succeeding years, mainly in the lowlands. Five hymns were inserted at this time without church authority. Reflecting a move from the simplicity and plainness of earlier Scottish worship in some later editions there was also a set of seven trinitarian doxologies ("To Father, Son and Holy Ghost..."), each for a different metrical pattern, which could be sung at the close of a psalm. These were printed together at the end of the psalms, and were intended to allow the Old Testament text to be sung in the light of the New.

All the psalms were present in common meter (CM), which meant that in principle any psalm could be sung to any psalm tune, though not every possible combination would have been regarded as good taste. Musical editions of the psalter were published with the pages sliced horizontally, the tunes in the top half and the texts in the bottom, allowing the two parts of the volume to be opened independently. The music section was arranged alphabetically by the traditional names of the melodies. Psalm 23, "The Lord's my shepherd", would typically be sung to tune 144 "Wiltshire" (tune "Crimond", written in 1872, becoming overwhelmingly popular from the 1930s), but could theoretically be sung to almost any other, the only restriction being the conventions of familiarity.

In addition, some psalms had alternative versions in other meters, including long meter (LM), short meter (SM), and irregular metrical patterns, and each of these had a unique tune. From the 19th century onwards, these often appeared at the end of music editions in whole rather than split pages. An example of a special setting is Psalm 24:7–10, "Ye gates lift up your heads", to the tune "St. George's Edinburgh", a rousing piece traditionally sung after Communion.

== Church Hymnary (1898) ==
The introduction of hymns was part of a reform of worship in the second half of the 19th century which also saw the appearance of church organs and stained glass. This reform began in individual congregations such as Greyfriars Kirk, and it took several decades before the General Assembly was ready to produce a hymnal for the whole of the Church.

The Church Hymnary was compiled by a committee made up of equal numbers of representatives from the Church of Scotland, Free Church of Scotland, the United Presbyterian Church and the Presbyterian Church in Ireland. As such, the book was authorised for use in public worship by the four Presbyterian denominations. In the preface it was noted that the book was issued "with the fervant prayer that its use in the praises of the sanctuary may be to the glory of God and the edification of His people."

The Hymnary was intended to be used together with the psalter, and thus omitted such favourites as "The Lord's my shepherd". It contained 650 pieces.

== Church Hymnary, revised edition (1927) ==
The second edition of the Hymnary, often abbreviated to RCH or CH2, coincided with the preparations for the union of the Church of Scotland with the United Free Church of Scotland (1929). The 1922 General Assembly of the Church of Scotland, along with other sister denominations, instructed their praise committees to work on a revised Church Hymnary. RCH contains 728 hymns and was edited by Welsh composer David Evans. Like its predecessor, it was printed together with the psalter in a single volume, and thus the hymnary itself does not include any of the metrical psalms.

The original draft was produced in 1925, with 694 hymns. After revision and suggestions, this was amended to the final total of 728 hymns. The book was published on 29 September 1927, by the Oxford University Press. There were five forms of the book published: the Standard Staff edition, the Standard Sol-fa Edition; the Melody Edition; words only in longprimer type; and words only in nonpariel type.

It was authorised for use in the Church of Scotland, the United Free Church of Scotland, the Presbyterian Church in Ireland, the Presbyterian Church of England, the Presbyterian Church of Wales, the Presbyterian Church of Australia, the Presbyterian Church of New Zealand and the Presbyterian Church of South Africa. The Free Church of Scotland was not included, as in 1905, after the 1900 union, the remaining congregations rescinded the previous General Assembly Acts allowing uninspired sung worship.

A useful resource was the Handbook to the Church Hymnary by James Moffatt and Millar Patrick (published 1927, revised 1928). It gave lengthy biographical notes on the authors and composers, and commentaries on the hymns, as well as additional indexes. It was republished with a supplement in 1935.

== Church Hymnary, third edition (1973) ==
Known as CH3, the 1973 hymnary was more than a new edition, it was an entirely new compilation. It appeared in Oxford University Press, and contained 695 items. When it first appeared, it was widely criticised for omitting many favourite hymns ("By cool Siloam's shady rill" was a prominent example), but it introduced many modern hymns like "Tell out my soul" which soon became popular – albeit to the tune "Woodlands" rather than the prescribed tune "Mappersley" which is rarely, if ever, used.

CH3 included those metrical psalms (or sections of psalms) which were most frequently used, and thus effectively replaced the psalter in most congregations, though a version with the full psalter at the front was also printed. All the metrical psalms in the volume were expanded with a trinitarian doxology which the Psalter had printed separately; as a result, these suddenly came to be used far more frequently than ever before.

The volume is structured thematically under eight sections, each (except the last) with a number of subsections:

1. Approach to God
2. The Word of God: His mighty acts
3. Response to the Word of God
4. The sacraments
5. Other ordinances
6. Times and seasons
7. Close of service
8. Personal faith and devotion

The distinctive plain red cover set CH3 apart from the previous hymnbooks and psalters, which all had dark blue-black bindings.

Like RCH, CH3 also had a handbook: John Barkley, Handbook to the Church Hymnary Third Edition, OUP 1979. Its commentaries are less full and scholarly than those of Moffatt and Patrick, but more closely tailored to the needs of worship preparation.

== Songs of God's People (1988) ==
Songs of God's People was conceived as a supplement to CH3, and in many congregations the two were used together. For this reason, it includes no material which is also in CH3, but it does revive a number of items from RCH which had been dropped in the 1973 revision. It also included music from a variety of sources which greatly increased the range of types of music available for worship. For the first time, a Church of Scotland hymnary had:

- evangelical choruses of the Mission Praise tradition.
- items of the Wild Goose Resource Group of the Iona Community worship (21 of which were composed by John L. Bell, who chaired the supplement committee).
- sung responses for use in prayers, which until this time much of the Church of Scotland had regarded with suspicion as being too "Catholic"; three of these were in Latin.
- short choruses in Swahili, which must be seen in the context of liberation theology and the campaign against apartheid.
- three of the rock-idiom psalm arrangements by Ian White.
- a Russian Orthodox Kyrie eleison.

While it is undoubtedly true that many congregations did not take advantage of the full range of this music, the volume contributed greatly to an openness to new ideas in worship.

There are 120 songs in Songs of God's People. Unlike the hymnaries, but in common with most evangelical chorus books, the volume is not arranged thematically but in alphabetical order of the first lines.

== Church Hymnary, fourth edition (2005) ==
In 1994 the General Assembly of the Church of Scotland appointed a committee to revise the hymnary; the convener was again John L. Bell. After consultation and protracted difficulties in obtaining copyright for some hymns, Church Hymnary, fourth edition (CH4) appeared in May 2005. It is published by the Canterbury Press (Norwich) and contains 825 items. In the spirit of Songs of God's People it continues the quest for diversity. For the first time a hymn book which was not specifically produced for the Gaelic community contains a hymn in Gaelic, the Christmas carol "Leanabh an àigh", for which the original text now appears in parallel to the translation "Child in a manger". Many hymns have been modified to incorporate 'inclusive language'. For example, "He gave me eyes so I could see", has been rewritten as "God gave me eyes so I could see" (Hymn 164). The feminist theology of the Motherhood of God is represented in "Mothering God" (Hymn 117). However, the temptation to reword such as "thy" to "your" has been resisted for old favourites, so, for example, "Great is thy faithfulness" remains untouched.

In a deliberate echo of RCH, CH4 opens with a collection of psalms arranged in the order of their original Psalm numbers (Hymns 1–108). Many of these come from the Scottish Psalter, and appear here without the doxologies added in CH3. (These doxologies are included as Hymn 109, but their separation from the texts of the psalms presumably means they will be relatively seldom used.) But the section also includes psalms from other musical traditions, as well as prose psalms for responsive reading – still not common in the Church of Scotland. The volume then continues, as did CH3, with a thematic arrangement of hymns, this time divided into three main sections each associated with one person of the Holy Trinity and subdivided into aspects of God and the Church's response. There then follows an international section of short songs, including evangelical choruses by writers such as Graham Kendrick and pieces from Taizé and the Iona Community. A final short section contains Amens and Doxologies.

In some ways this is the Church of Scotland's most ambitious hymnal to date, and certainly it is the longest. The immediate reaction of the Scottish press after publication was to report complaints of pensioners who found the volume too heavy to carry to Church, but its strength no doubt lies in the breadth of musical and theological traditions which it seeks to embrace. CH4 has a purple binding.

The hymnary is available in three editions: Full Music, Melody and Text. There is also a large print version. Music edition: ISBN 1-85311-613-0

A scripture index to CH4 is provided by George K. Barr, Selecting Hymns from CH4, no publisher, no ISBN, 2005.

In February 2008 Canterbury Press released a version of CH4 for the wider church, called Hymns of Glory, Songs of Praise, featuring the same content as CH4 under a different cover. This has proved popular in some liberal Anglican churches and United Reformed Churches.

The Presbyterian Church in Ireland and the United Presbyterian Church were involved in the compilation of the Church Hymnary (1898) and several Presbyterian denominations in the Revised Church Hymnary (1928) and the Church Hymnary third edition (1973). The Presbyterian Church in Ireland declined to be involved in the fourth edition and published its own Irish Presbyterian Hymn Book in 2004.

== God Welcomes All (2024) ==
At the General Assembly of 2019, there was a call to create a contemporary resource to complement the Church's existing rich musical resources.

Five years later, at the 2024 General Assembly, the new resource, titled 'God Welcomes All' was launched at St Cuthbert's Church on 19 May. It includes 219 hymns and songs from a variety of styles, with a focus on hospitality and welcome. Most of these songs were written in the 21st century. The resource includes songs by well-known writers such as John Bell, Getty Music, Phil Wickham, Fischy Music, Shirley Erena Murray, Sinach and Rend Collective.

The shape of the book is as follows:

- Scripture Songs from the Psalms, Old Testament and New Testament;
- Music for use throughout services, including Gathering, Confession, Approach, Prayer, Communion, Baptism, Sending and Blessing;
- Music for all parts of the Church Year;
- Hymns and songs covering a range of themes, including The Living God, Creation, Christian Life, Hurt and Healing, Church and Community, and Justice and Peace.

Around 10,000 songs were considered by the editorial team, who then worked with a committee of experts in music, ministry and theology to narrow this down to 219 songs. Due to the very broad nature of the Church of Scotland in its style of worship, the songs selected for the book represent a breadth of approaches and theological perspectives.

The co-editors were Iain McLarty (Priority Areas Worship Development Worker) and Phill Mellstrom (Church of Scotland's Worship Development Worker).

== See also ==
- List of English-language hymnals by denomination
- Metrical psalter

=== 16th century Protestant hymnals ===
Anabaptist

- Ausbund

Anglican

- Book of Common Prayer
- Whole Book of Psalms

Lutheran

- First Lutheran hymnal
- Erfurt Enchiridion
- Eyn geystlich Gesangk Buchleyn
- Swenske songer eller wisor 1536
- Thomissøn's hymnal

Presbyterian

- Book of Common Order

Reformed

- Souterliedekens
- Genevan Psalter
