= Hymnology =

Study of religious song

Hymnology (from Greek ὕμνος hymnos, "song of praise" and -λογία -logia, "study of") is the scholarly study of religious song, or the hymn, in its many aspects, with particular focus on choral and congregational song. It may be more or less clearly distinguished from hymnody, the creation and practice of such song. Hymnologists, such as Erik Routley, may study the history and origins of hymns and of traditions of sung worship, the biographies of the women and men who have written hymns that have passed into choral or congregational use, the interrelationships between text and tune, the historical processes, both folk and redactional, that have changed hymn texts and hymn tunes over time, and the sociopolitical, theological and aesthetic arguments concerning various styles of sung worship.

Hymnology is not an "-ology" in the usual sense of an independent discipline that has a proper set of concepts and critical vocabulary that must first be learned before progress can be made. Rather, it's two disciplines: one that studies the texts and follows the rules of literary scholarship, the other that is trained in music and follows the rules of musicology. The "-ology" just means that they might publish in the same journals, occasionally attend the same conferences, or be asked to serve on a hymnal committee. If they write about the interaction between music and text, this is purely by instinct: there is no "scholarly consensus" for an underlying set of principles about how the interaction can be optimized. Often, the term "hymnologist" simply refers to anyone who has enough standing within the faith community to be asked to serve on a hymnal committee.

Hymnology is sometimes more strictly construed, as in A Dictionary of Hymnology, edited by John D. Julian, which concerns itself very largely with the history, textual changes, and translations of hymns, and with the biographies of hymnographers, and very little with the poetic metres of these hymns, or with the hymn tunes to which these are sung.

== Great Four Anglican Hymns ==
The "Great Four" are four hymns widely popular in Anglican and other Protestant churches during the 19th century.

In his Anglican Hymnology, published in 1885, the Rev. James King surveyed 52 hymnals from the member churches of the Anglican Communion around the world, and found that 51 of them included these hymns, the so-called Great Four:

1. All Praise to Thee, my God, this Night, text by Thomas Ken
2. Hark! The Herald Angels Sing, text by Charles Wesley
3. Lo! He Comes With Clouds Descending, text by Charles Wesley
4. Rock of Ages, Cleft for Me, text by Augustus Montague Toplady

King also found the following six hymns in 49 of the 52 hymnals:

5. Abide with Me, Fast Falls the Eventide, text by Henry Francis Lyte
6. Awake my Soul and With the Sun, text by Thomas Ken
7. Jerusalem the Golden, text by Bernard of Cluny, English translation by John Mason Neale
8. Jesus, Lover of My Soul, text by Charles Wesley
9. Sun of My Soul, Thou Savior Dear, text by John Keble
10. When I Survey the Wondrous Cross, text by Isaac Watts

All of these hymns likewise appear in The Best Church Hymns, published by the Rev. Louis F. Benson in 1898. Benson's collection of 32 frequently published hymns from various churches was based upon a survey of 107 Protestant hymnals, including King's book, thus representing "the judgment of our common Protestantism."

== See also ==
- Foot (prosody)
- Hymn tune
- Hymnal
- Hymn Society in the United States and Canada
- Hymnographer
- Hymns and hymn tunes
- Metre (hymn)
- Metre (poetry)
- Hymnody of continental Europe
