= Lucerna Laudoniæ =

Hymn tune

Lucerna Laudoniæ is a hymn tune by David Evans ("E. Arthur") (1874–1948), commonly used for the text For the beauty of the earth, composed in 1927.

== Composition and publication ==
Lucerna Laudoniæ was composed under the pseudonym "Edward Arthur" and published in the Revised Church Hymnary in 1927. It is said to have been inspired by the view from a hill near the composer's home town of Bath. The copyright was held by Oxford University Press, until copyright expired at the end of 2018.

== Other uses ==
Although the hymn tune was written for the text For the beauty of the earth, it has also more recently been used for Martyrs, you were Christ below in "Hymns for the Church" (the official hymnal of the Anglican Church of Papua New Guinea). It has also been used as an alternative tune for the text God of mercy, God of grace by Henry Francis Lyte.
