= Scottish Psalter (1564) =

First psalter to be published in Scotland

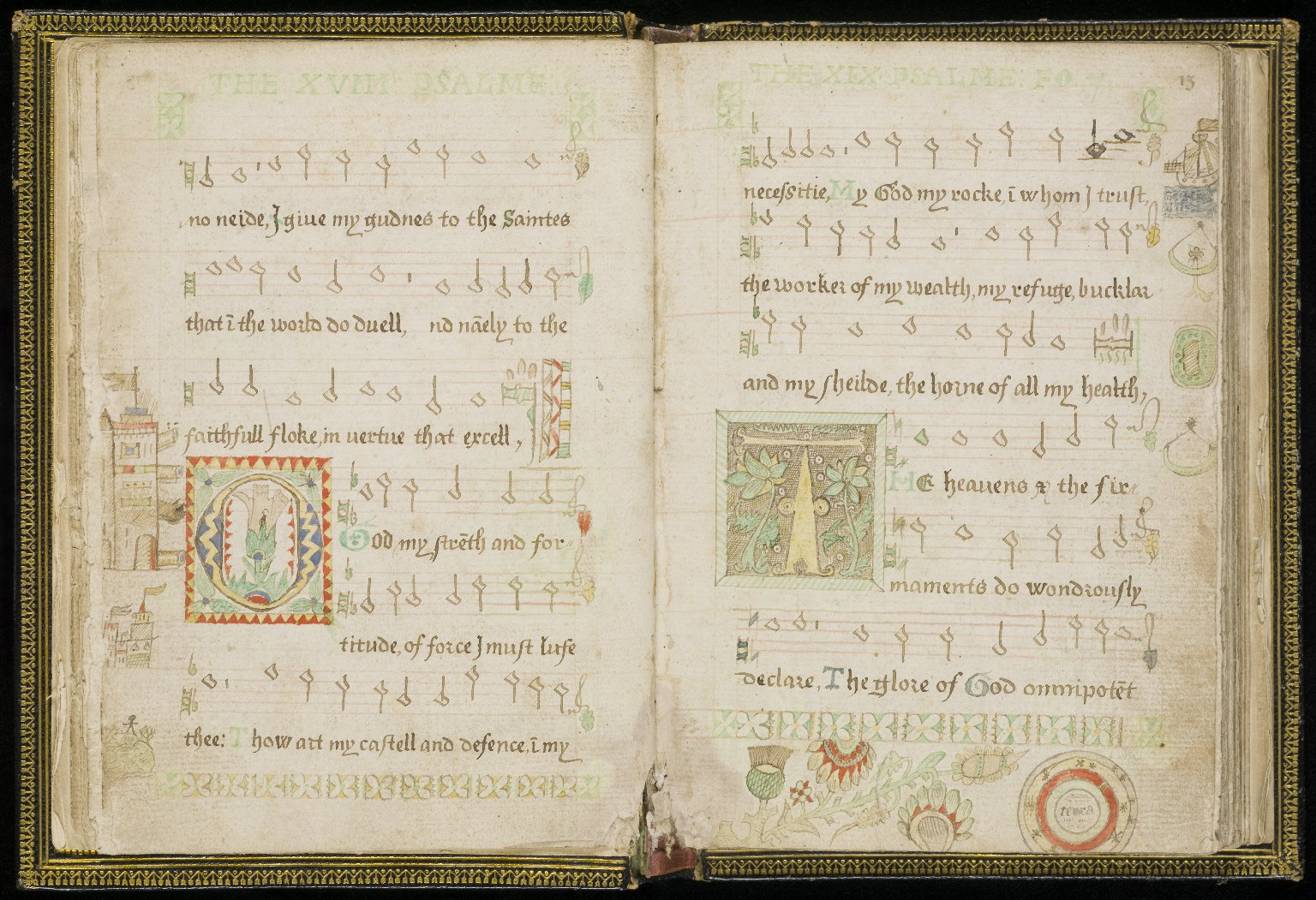
Psalm 118 in the 1564 Scottish Metrical Psalter

The Scottish Psalter of 1564 was the first psalter or psalm book to be published in Scotland. It was published by the Church of Scotland under the influence of John Knox as part of the Book of Common Order which was a more general directory for public worship. The precise details concerning the publication of the Scottish Psalter are not known as the early records of the Church of Scotland are lost. However, it appears that its publication was determined at the Church's General Assembly in December 1562.

== Background and composition ==
In 1556 the first Anglo-Genevan Psalter (English versifications of Calvin's Genevan Psalter) was published for the use of John Knox's congregation and contained 51 psalms, most of which originated in England from the poets Thomas Sternhold and John Hopkins. It formed the basis of the first Scottish Psalter of 1564, which reproduced the Anglo-Genevan Psalter with most of its tunes, completing it on the same principles to contain all 150 psalms. Neither of these included hymns. The text of this Psalter expresses the spirit of the original without undue pains to render the text literally. While only the melodies of the tunes were printed, part singing was certainly known, as there is a record of a four-part rendition of Psalm 124 being sung to welcome John Durie back to Edinburgh from exile in 1582. There were 30 metres in all: ninety-eight psalms were set to common metre, 10 to long metre, 6 to short metre and 4 to long metre (6 lines), and there were 26 metres for the other 32 psalms. Some editions of this Psalter printed in 1575 or later included up to 10 other pieces, but these were probably only intended for devotional purposes. Duguid has shown that the Scottish General Assembly closely guarded psalm publishing and had previously disciplined printers for editing the psalms (as had also been done in Calvin's Geneva).

== Development ==
The 1564 edition went through many changes that culminated with the 1635 version. Edited by Edward Millar, the 1635 Scottish Psalter included the very best of the psalm settings for the Sternhold and Hopkins psalms. This included four-part homophonic settings of many of the psalms (those texts that did not have a proper melody were assigned a melody from another psalm), several more complicated or polyphonic psalm settings (also known as Psalms in Reports), and settings of many of the so-called Common Tunes that had come to be used in the seventeenth century.

== See also ==
- Hymnbooks of the Church of Scotland
