= Descant =

Music that features a fixed vocal melody set to improvisations, often in counterpoint

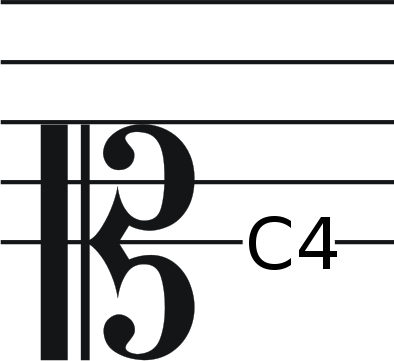
Soprano clef

A descant, discant, or discantus is any of several different things in music, depending on the period in question; etymologically, the word means a voice (cantus) above or removed from others. The Harvard Dictionary of Music states:

Anglicized form of L. discantus and a variant of discant. Throughout the Middle Ages the term was used indiscriminately with other terms, such as descant. In the 17th century it took on special connotations in instrumental practice.

A descant is a form of medieval music in which one singer sang a fixed melody, and others accompanied with improvisations. The word in this sense comes from the term discantus supra librum (descant "above the book"), and is a form of Gregorian chant in which only the melody is notated but an improvised polyphony is understood. The discantus supra librum had specific rules governing the improvisation of the additional voices.

Later on, the term came to mean the treble or soprano singer in any group of voices, or the higher pitched line in a song. Eventually, by the Renaissance, descant referred generally to counterpoint. Nowadays the counterpoint meaning is the most common.

Descant can also refer to the highest pitched of a group of instruments, particularly the descant viol or recorder. Similarly, it can also be applied to the soprano clef.

In modern usage, especially in the context of church music, descant can also refer to a high, florid melody sung by a few sopranos as a decoration for a hymn.

On instruments with multiple keyboards, such as the accordion, the term "descant" or "diskant" is sometimes applied to the keyboard or manual intended for the melody, as opposed to the accompaniment(s).

== Origin and development ==
Descant is a type of medieval polyphony characterized by relatively strict note-for-note counterpoint. It is found in the organum with a plainchant tenor (i.e. low voice; vox principis), and in the conductus without the requirement of a plainchant tenor. It is sometimes contrasted with the organum in a more restricted sense of the term (see 12-century Aquitanian polyphony below).

The term continued to be used down to modern times with changing senses, at first for polyphony in general, then to differentiate a subcategory of polyphony (either in contrast to organum, or for improvised as distinct from written polyphony). By extension it became the name of a part that is added above the tenor, and later as the name of the highest part in a polyphonic setting (the equivalent of "cantus", "superius", and "soprano"). Finally, it was adopted as the name of the highest register of instruments such as recorders, cornets, viols, and organ stops.

"English discant is three-voice parallelism in first-inversion triads." However, because it allowed only three, four, or at most five such chords in succession, emphasizing contrary motion as the basic condition, it "did not differ from the general European discant tradition of the time". Because English discant technique has commonly been associated with such a succession of first-inversion triads, it has inevitably become confused with fauxbourdon, with which it has "no connection whatsoever". This misinterpretation was first brought forward in 1936 by Manfred Bukofzer, but has been proved invalid, first in 1937 by Thrasybulos Georgiades, and then by Sylvia Kenney and Ernest H. Sanders. A second hypothesis, that an unwritten tradition of this kind of parallel discant existed in England before 1500, "is supported neither by factual evidence nor by probability".

== In hymns ==
Hymn tune descants are counter-melodies, generally at a higher pitch than the main melody. Typically they are sung in the final or penultimate verse of a hymn.

Although the English Hymnal of 1906 did not include descants, this influential hymnal, whose music editor was Ralph Vaughan Williams, served as a source of tunes for which the earliest known hymn tune descants were published. These were in collections compiled by Athelstan Riley, who wrote "The effect is thrilling; it gives the curious impression of an ethereal choir joining in the worship below; and those who hear it for the first time often turn and look up at the roof!". An example of a descant from this collection (for the British national anthem) goes as follows:

Among composers of descants during 1915 to 1934 were Alan Gray, Geoffrey Shaw, and Ralph Vaughan Williams. Several of their descants appear in what is possibly the earliest hymnal to include descants, Songs of Praise (London: Oxford University Press, 1925, enlarged, 1931, reprinted 1971).

During the last quarter of the twentieth century, new editions of hymnals increased the number of included descants. For example, the influential Hymnal 1940 (Episcopal) contains no descants, whereas its successor, The Hymnal 1982, contains 32. Among other currently used hymnals, The Worshiping Church contains 29 descants; The Presbyterian Hymnal, 19; The New Century Hymnal, 10; Chalice Hymnal, 21. The Vocal Descant Edition for Worship, Third Edition (GIA Publications, 1994) offers 254 descants by composers such as Hal Hopson, David Hurd, Robert Powell, Richard Proulx, and Carl Schalk.

In the United Kingdom and elsewhere, the Carols for Choirs collection, which features descants by David Willcocks and others to well known Christmas tunes such as "O come, all ye faithful" has contributed to the enduring popularity of the genre.

== 12th-century Aquitanian polyphony ==
This style was dominant in early 12th century Aquitanian polyphony, and can be identified by the following characteristics:

1. Both the tenor and upper parts move at about the same rate, using the equalitas punctorum (an approximately equal rate of movement in all the voices) with between one and three notes in the upper part to every note in the tenor part. At the end of a phrase however, in discant style, the upper part may have more notes, thus producing a more melismatic passage at a cadence.
2. Throughout the discant passages, the two parts interchange between consonant intervals: octaves, fifths.
3. Discant style is characterised by the use of rhythmic modes throughout each part. In earlier types of organum, rhythm was either not notated as in organum purum, or notated in only the upper voice part, however Notre Dame composers devised a way of notating rhythm using ligatures and six different types of rhythmic modes.

Examples of this can be found in some of Léonin’s late 12th-century settings. These settings are often punctuated with passages in discant style, where both the tenor and upper voice move in modal rhythms, often the tenor part in mode 5 (two long notes) and the upper part in mode 1 (a long then short note). Therefore it is easier to imagine how discant style would have sounded, and we can make a guess as to how to recreate the settings. It is suggested by scholars such as Grout, that Léonin used this non-melismatic style in order to mirror the grandeur of Notre Dame Cathedral itself.

Current research suggests that the word 'discantus' was formed with the intention of providing a separate term for a newly developed type of polyphony. If true, then it is ironic that the newer term, "discantus", ended up being applied to the older note-against-note style, while the older word "organum" was transferred to the more innovative style of florid-against-sustained-note polyphony. This may have been partly because the 12th century was an era that believed in progress, so that the more familiar "organum" was kept for the style then considered to be the most up-to-date.

=== Discant in three or four voices ===
The development of modal rhythms enabled the progression from two part discant style to three and four part discant style. This is because, only voices, confined to a set rhythm can be combined effectively to make a set phrase. This was mainly related to Pérotin, around 1200. The parts in these three and four part settings were not necessarily related to each other. Evidence suggests that the parts were either related to the tenor part, or composed independently. Either way, this formed the first ‘composition’, and provided a foundation for development, and a new style, conductus was developed from the three and four part discant ideas.

== See also ==
- Anglican church music
- Congregational singing
- Hymn tunes
- Last verse harmonisation
- Organ
