= Common metre =

Type of poetic metre

Common metre or common measure—abbreviated as C. M. or CM—is a poetic metre consisting of four lines that alternate between iambic tetrameter (four metrical feet per line) and iambic trimeter (three metrical feet per line), with each foot consisting of an unstressed syllable followed by a stressed syllable. The metre is denoted by the syllable count of each line, i.e. 8.6.8.6, 86.86, or 86 86, depending on style, or by its shorthand abbreviation "CM".

Common metre has been used for ballads such as "Tam Lin", hymns such as "Amazing Grace", and Christmas carols such as "O Little Town of Bethlehem". A consequence of this commonality is that lyrics of one song can be sung to the tune of another; for example, "Advance Australia Fair", "House of the Rising Sun", "Pokémon Theme" and "Amazing Grace" can have their lyrics set to the tune of any of the others. Historically, lyrics were not always wedded to tunes and would therefore be sung to any fitting melody; "Amazing Grace", for instance, was not set to the tune "New Britain" (with which it is most commonly associated today) until fifty-six years after its initial publication in 1779.

== Variants ==
Common metre is related to other poetic forms.

=== Ballad metre ===
Like common metre, ballad metre comprises couplets of tetrameter (four feet) and trimeter (three feet). However, the feet need not be iambs (with one unstressed and one stressed syllable): the number of unstressed syllables is variable. Ballad metre is "less regular and more conversational" than common metre.

In each stanza, ballad form typically needs to rhyme only the second lines of the couplets, not the first, giving a rhyme scheme of ABCB, while common metre typically rhymes both the first lines and the second lines, ABAB. A ballad in groups of four lines with a rhyme scheme of ABCB is known as the ballad stanza.

He does not rise in piteous haste
To put on convict-clothes,
While some coarse-mouthed Doctor gloats, and notes
Each new and nerve-twitched pose,
Fingering a watch whose little ticks
Are like horrible hammer-blows.

— Oscar Wilde, from The Ballad of Reading Gaol

=== Fourteener ===
The fourteener is a metrical line of 14 syllables (usually seven iambic feet).

Fourteeners typically occur in couplets. Fourteener couplets broken into quatrains (four-line stanzas) are equivalent to quatrains in common metre or ballad metre: instead of alternating lines of tetrameter and trimeter, a fourteener joins the tetrameter and trimeter lines to give seven feet per line.

The fourteener gives the poet greater flexibility than common metre, in that its long lines invite the use of variably placed caesuras and spondees to achieve metrical variety, in place of a fixed pattern of iambs and line breaks.

Whose sense in so evil consort, their stepdame Nature lays,
That ravishing delight in them most sweet tunes do not raise;
Or if they do delight therein, yet are so cloyed with wit,
As with sententious lips to set a title vain on it:
O let them hear these sacred tunes, and learn in wonder’s schools,
To be (in things past bounds of wit) fools, if they be not fools.

— Philip Sidney, from Astrophel and Stella (Seventh Song)

=== Common-metre double and particular ===
Another common adaptation of the common metre is the common-metre double, which as the name suggests, is the common metre repeated twice in each stanza, or 8.6.8.6.8.6.8.6. Traditionally the rhyming scheme should also be double the common metre and be ABABCDCD, but it often uses the ballad metre style, resulting in XAXAXBXB. Examples of this variant are "America the Beautiful" and "It Came Upon the Midnight Clear". Likewise related is the common particular metre, 8.8.6.8.8.6., as in the tune Magdalen College, composed in 1774 by William Hayes, which has been used with the hymn "We Sing of God, the Mighty Source", by Christopher Smart.

== Examples ==
Common metre is often used in hymns, such as Amazing Grace by John Newton.

Amazing Grace, how sweet the sound,
That saved a wretch like me!
I once was lost, but now am found,
Was blind, but now I see.

— from John Newton's "Amazing Grace"

William Wordsworth's "Lucy Poems" are also in common metre.

A slumber did my spirit seal;
I had no human fears:
She seemed a thing that could not feel
The touch of earthly years.

— from William Wordsworth's "A slumber did my spirit seal"

Many of the poems of Emily Dickinson use ballad metre.

Because I could not stop for Death,
He kindly stopped for me;
The Carriage held but just Ourselves
And Immortality.

— from Emily Dickinson's poem #712

== See also ==
- Foot (prosody)
- Hymn tune
- Hymnology
- Hymns and hymn tunes
- Long metre
- Metre (hymn)
- Metre (poetry)
- Short metre
