= Pteleum (Ionia) =

Ancient city of Ionia

Coordinates: 38°29′N 26°25′E

Pteleum or Pteleon (Ancient Greek: Πτελεόν) was a fortress town in the territory of Erythrae, in Ionia. Pliny the Elder mentions Pteleon, Helos, and Dorium as near Erythrae, but those places are confused by Pliny with the Triphylian towns in Homer's Catalogue of Ships in the Iliad.

Pteleum was a member of the Delian League since it is mentioned in tribute records to Athens at least between the years 450/49 and 430/29 BCE.

Thucydides places it in the territory of Erythrae and says that, like Sidussa it was a fortified place that was used by the Athenian army under the command of Leon and Diomedon to attack positions on Chios in the year 412 BCE. The following winter Astyochos, in command of Spartan ships along with others from Chios, attacked Pteleum, but failed to take it.

Its location is near Karareis-Meli in İzmir Province, Turkey.
