= England's Lane (hymn tune) =

Musical composition

England’s Lane is a hymn tune by Geoffrey Turton Shaw (1879–1943). It is sometimes used as an alternative tune for For the beauty of the earth, or for Jane Eliza Leeson's paraphrase of Victimae paschali laudes (Christ the Lord is risen today, not to be confused with the Charles Wesley text with the same first line).
