= The National Song Book =

1906 British songbook

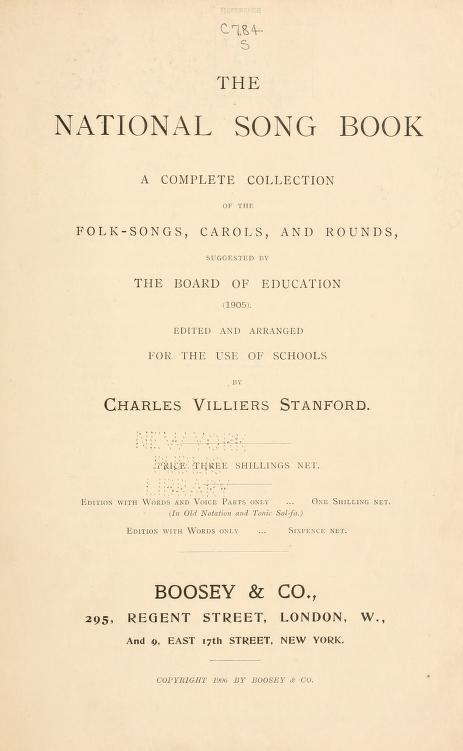
- Title page of the original edition
- Author: Charles Villiers Stanford
- Publisher: Boosey & Co.
- Publication date: 1906

The National Song Book (1906) was a collection of British songs edited and arranged by Charles Villiers Stanford and published by Boosey & Co London. The book's publication followed Stanford's work editing three volumes on the collection made by George Petrie of the folk music of Ireland and he was supported in this by Arthur Somervell (his ex-pupil and Inspector of Music at the Board of Education). It includes folk-songs, carols, and rounds with the choice reflecting the suggestions of Britain's Board of Education in their 1905 Blue Book of Suggestions. The aim of the work was to provide older school children with a "gateway to musical taste and knowledge". The songs included are from England, Ireland, Scotland and Wales and it is notable that they include songs of national rebellions against British rule but, as Knevett (2014) notes, these songs are included as a celebration of a more turbulent past presented as a stage in the development towards a more stable present. The arrangements in the book are presented in a simple fashion. It argues these are "merely intended to suggest sufficient harmony to make clear the tonality of each song, and in some cases to reinforce the characteristic rhythm, without distracting the attention of the singers from the melody itself". The book also notes the likelihood that English children, whilst they might find the Celtic scales and intervals difficult at first the "trouble involved will be amply repaid by the widening of their musical horizon, and by the more deeply poetical influence which Keltic music will exert upon the young mind".

Cox (1992) argues in a polemical historiography of the book that "The National Song Book proclaimed the hegemony of the literate tradition as opposed to the oral, and considers the view that national songs contained within them the danger of the manipulation of patriotism."

An updated edition The New National Song Book, edited by another of Stanford's pupils Geoffrey Shaw (also with credit to the then deceased Stanford) and published by Boosey & Hawkes, was released in 1938.

== The Books ==
- Stanford, C. V. (1906). The National Song Book: A Complete Collection of the Folk-songs, Carols, and Rounds suggested by the Board of Education (1905). London, Boosey & Co.
- Stanford, C. V., & Shaw, G. T. (1938). The New National Song Book. London, Boosey & Hawkes.
