= John Cennick =

English Methodist, Moravian evangelist and hymnwriter

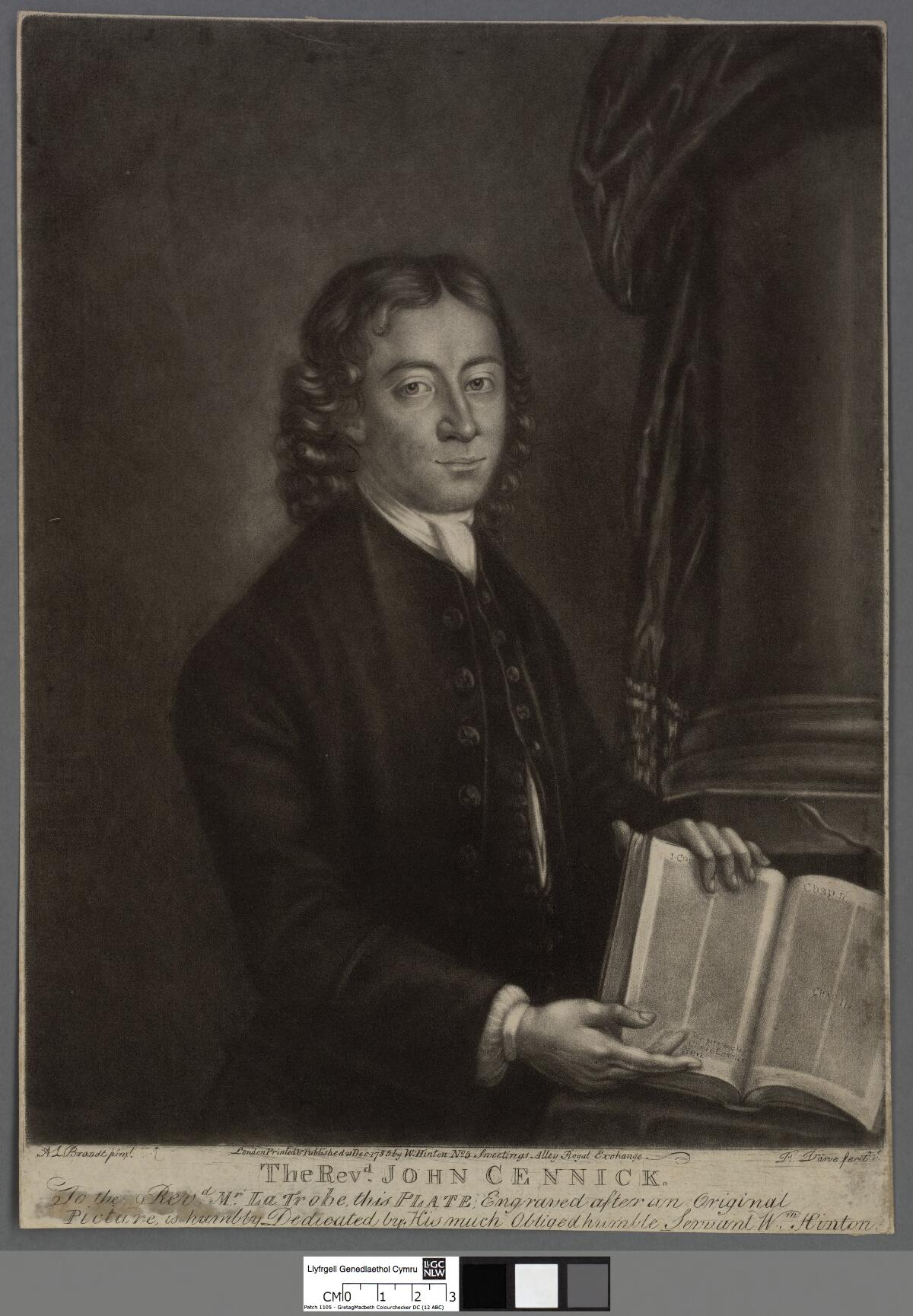
John Cennick

John Cennick (12 December 1718 – 4 July 1755) was an English Methodist and Moravian evangelist and hymnwriter. He was born in Reading, Berkshire, England to an Anglican family and raised in the Church of England.

According to Moravian Bishop E. R. Hasse, Cennick's family was from Bohemia, and left as a result of persecutions following the Battle of White Mountain. In England, his family became Quakers when his grandfather became influenced by George Fox.

== Early life ==
At age nine, he heard his dying aunt proclaim "Last night the Lord stood by me and invited me to drink of the fountain of life freely and I shall stand before the Lord as bold as a lion." The words stayed with him for many years as the focus of his own fear of death and concern for his salvation. Being from a family of humble means, John was compelled, at the age of 13, to leave school and seek an apprenticeship. He made eight trips to London looking for a position and, failing, became somewhat of a dissolute youth, spending what little money he had on plays and gambling, and engaged in lying and petty theft. Of this period in his life, he later said "I had forgot Jesus and everlasting ages:... loving ungodliness more than goodness and to talk of lies more than righteousness."

== Conversion ==
As a youth he delighted in attending dances, playing cards, and going to the theatre. But in 1735, while walking hastily along Cheapside, London, he experienced deep convictions of sin. These convictions were strengthened by his association with pious companions. He was greatly depressed in mind...[b]ut he did not yet possess true Christian peace. On the contrary, he went, step by step, down into the dark depths of spiritual despair.

At the age of 17, he was suddenly oppressed by a heavy spirit, which he endured for two years, until relief came when he happened into a church. There he heard the words of Psalm 34:19,22b: "(19) Great are the troubles of the righteous, but the Lord delivereth him out of them all! (22b) And he that putteth his trust in God shall not be desolate." He later said that he heard the voice of Christ speaking to him.

My heart danced for joy and my dying soul revived. I heard the voice of Jesus saying, "I am thy salvation". I no more groaned under the weight of sin. The fears of hell were taken away ... Christ loved me and died for me, I rejoiced in God my Saviour.

Cennick worked for a time as surveyor in Reading. He began reading the writings of George Whitefield, and through a friend at Oxford he met Whitefield, John Wesley, and Charles Wesley.

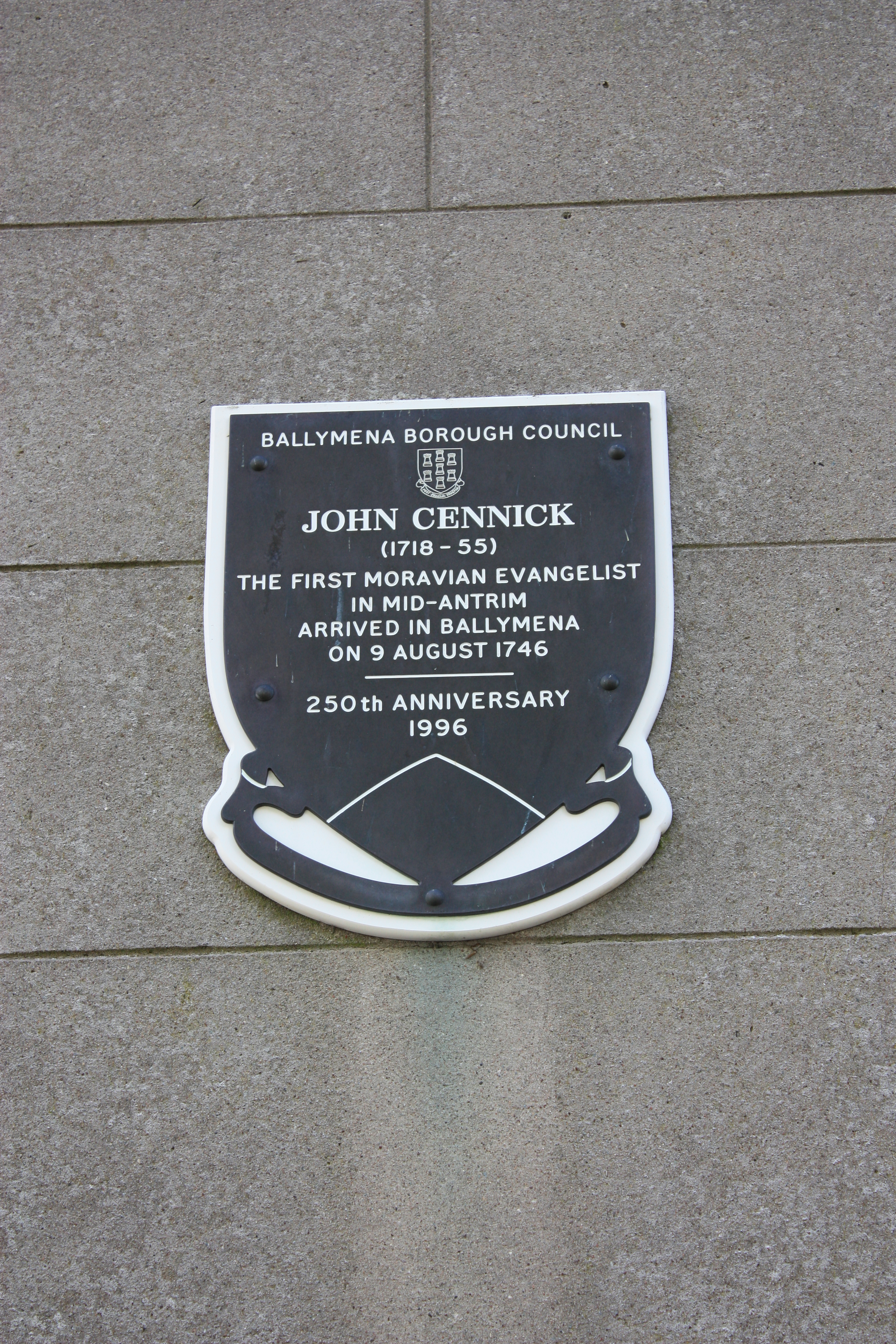
Moravian Church, Gracehill, September 2009

== Ministry ==
Cennick joined the nascent Methodist movement. In 1740, he became a teacher at Kingswood, England, on Wesley's recommendation.

On Kingswood Hill, amid the remains of the old Royal Chase, a crowd of colliers had assembled for a service, but the expected preacher failed to appear. Cennick was there, and as with one instinct the eyes of all turned to him, and many voices urged him to step into the breach. He hesitated; he reasoned with himself -- he was not prepared! he had never yet preached! nor was he licensed to do so! But there before him were the people waiting for the Word; and upon him was the sense of "the burden of the Lord." And so, finally, after earnest prayer, he obeyed the inner voice...and it led him along the God-appointed path of Evangelism, where his career was so short, so bright, and so full of blessing.

Like Whitefield he differed from Wesley on particular redemption and unconditional election and was obliged to leave. He eventually allied with the Calvinistic Methodists. After Whitefield returned from America, he asked Cennick to join him on preaching tours. In 1745 Cennick went over to the Moravians, and went to Germany to study their doctrines.

Some of Cennick's first hymns were included with his sermons. His first hymns appeared during his time at Kingswood. In Charles Wesley's diary (July 1739) he wrote, "I corrected Mr. Cennick's hymns for the press." Throughout the rest of his short career and life he published several collections of hymns. His son-in-law John Swertner included several of Cennick's hymns in a Moravian collection in 1789.

Although he wrote many hymns, Cennick is remembered un particular for eight included in many editions of Hymns Ancient & Modern:

- Be Present at Our Table, Lord
- Be with Me, Lord, Where'er I Go
- Children of the Heav'nly King
- Christ is Our Master, Lord, and God
- Hail, Alpha and Omega, Hail
- Rise, My Soul, Adore Your Maker
- verses of Christians, Dismiss Your Fear
- verses of Lo! He comes with clouds descending

He spent much time as an itinerant evangelist in England and Ireland, enduring great and often violent opposition. By the time of his early death, he had established over 40 churches.

John Cennick died of a fever in London at only 36 years of age, leaving a wife and two children, and is buried at the Moravian cemetery (Sharon's Garden) in Chelsea, England. John Julian wrote of Cennick: "Some of the stanzas of his hymns are very fine, but the hymns taken as a whole are most unequal. Some excellent centos might be compiled from his various works." Some of Cennick's hymns not published in his lifetime were included in the Moravian Hymn Book (1789), edited by his son-in-law, Johannes Swertner. A number of his hymns are preserved in the Sacred Harp.

== Works ==
- Sacred Hymns, for the Children of God in the Days of Their Pilgrimage, 1741.
- Sacred Hymns for the Use of Religious Societies, 1743.
- A Collection of Sacred Hymns, 1749.
- Hymns to the Honour of Jesus Christ, Composed for Such Little Children as Desire to Be Saved, 1754.
