= David Evans (composer) =

Welsh Musician, Hymn Writer

David Evans (6 February 1874 – 17 May 1948) was a Welsh musician, academic and composer.

Evans was born at Resolven, Glamorgan. He worked in the coal industry as a teenager, but music was always his primary interest. He won a music scholarship and became a pupil of Joseph Parry, which led to his qualifying at University College, Cardiff, in 1895. He went on to become organist and choirmaster of Jewin Calvinistic Methodist Church in London. He succeeded Joseph Parry, his former teacher, in the Music department at Cardiff, where he was appointed a professor in 1908. Among his students there were Morfydd Owen, Grace Williams and David Wynne.

Most of his compositions were of a religious nature, including many hymns. Evans edited the revised edition of the Church of Scotland's Church Hymnary in 1927. Notably, it is in this publication that he combined an old Irish folk song with a versified English translation of an 8th-century Irish poem to produce the now widely known Christian hymn, "Be Thou My Vision". One of his original hymn tunes, Lucerna Laudoniae, was used to set the words For The Beauty of the Earth. It was initially written under the pseudonym Edward Arthur.

Aside from hymns, Evans wrote anthems and service music as well as many orchestral and choral works. The oratorio Llawenhewch yn yr Iôr was first performed at the Caernarfon Festival in 1906 and a dramatic cantata The Coming of Arthur, was premiered at the Cardiff Triennial Festival the following year. His orchestral Concerto for String Orchestra op 7, was published as part of the Carnegie Collection of British Music in 1928. Some compositions attributed to him were in fact written by his eldest son, Arthur, who died in the influenza pandemic of 1918.

Evans participated actively in the Eisteddfod movement. He died at Rhosllannerchrugog. His papers are held by the National Library of Wales and some by his grandson, also named David Evans.
