= For the Beauty of the Earth =

Christian hymn by Folliott S. Pierpoint

- Genre: Hymn
- Written: 1864
- Text: Folliott S. Pierpoint
- Based on: Ephesians 5:20
- Meter: 7.7.7.7.7.7
- Melody: "Dix" by Conrad Kocher

"For the Beauty of the Earth" is a Christian hymn by Folliott S. Pierpoint (1835–1917).

== History ==
Pierpoint was 29 at the time he wrote this hymn; he was mesmerized by the beauty of the countryside that surrounded him. It first appeared in 1864 in a book of Eucharistic hymns and poems entitled Lyra Eucharistica, Hymns and Verses on the Holy Communion, Ancient and Modern; with Other Poems. It was written as a Eucharistic hymn—hence the title of "The Sacrifice of Praise", the refrain "Christ, our God, to Thee we raise, This, our sacrifice of praise", and as is seen throughout the original text of 1864, especially the last two lines which had replaced the Refrain in verse 8. This is how it appears in the 'English Hymnal' of 1933, with the two exceptions, that Pierpoint's last two lines which had replaced the Refrain after verse 8, were omitted and the Refrain sung instead, and the first two words of the last line in verse (three) "sinking sense", in common with all other hymnbooks was modified to "linking sense". The text was more radically modified by the publishers of "Hymns Ancient and Modern" for the 1916 Hymnbook, so it could serve as a general hymn.

== Music ==
The tune most widely used for this hymn is the same tune used for William Chatterton Dix's "As with Gladness Men of Old," an Epiphany carol composed five years prior but not released publicly until three years after Pierpont. (Although the tune is known traditionally as "Dix" in deference to William Dix, it was originally composed by Conrad Kocher in 1838.) Recently, one of the most popular tunes to which this hymn is sung is Lucerna Laudoniæ by David Evans ("E.Arthur") [1874–1948]. This is the set tune, for example, in The Hymnal 1982 of the Protestant Episcopal Church and Australia's 1999 Together in Song, the first set tune in the Church of Ireland's 2000 Church Hymnal and the Church of Scotland's 2005 Church Hymnary 4th Edition (Moseley the other), and the second set tune in England's 2000 Common Praise. Other tunes used are: "Warden" by James Turle (1802–1882) - as appeared in the 1916 Hymns A&M Standard, and England’s Lane by Geoffrey Turton Shaw (1879–1943) as it appeared in the English Hymnal.

Setting to the tune Dix by Conrad Kocher

== Hymn text ==
Original text of 1864:

For the beauty of the earth,
For the beauty of the skies,
For the Love which from our birth
Over and around us lies:
Christ, our God, to Thee we raise
This our Sacrifice of Praise.

For the beauty of each hour
Of the day and of the night,
Hill and vale, and tree and flower,
Sun and moon and stars of light:
Christ, our God, to Thee we raise
This our Sacrifice of Praise.

For the joy of ear and eye,
For the heart and brain's delight,
For the mystic harmony
Linking sense to sound and sight:
Christ, our God, to Thee we raise
This our Sacrifice of Praise.

For the joy of human love,
Brother, sister, parent, child,
Friends on earth, and friends above;
For all gentle thoughts and mild:
Christ, our God, to Thee we raise
This our Sacrifice of Praise.

For each perfect Gift of Thine
To our race so freely given,
Graces human and Divine,
Flowers of earth, and buds of Heaven:
Christ, our God, to Thee we raise
This our Sacrifice of Praise.

For Thy Bride that evermore
Lifteth holy hands above,
Offering up on every shore
This Pure Sacrifice of Love:
Christ, our God, to Thee we raise
This our Sacrifice of Praise.

For Thy Martyrs' crown of light,
For Thy Prophets' eagle eye,
For Thy bold Confessors' might,
For the lips of Infancy:
Christ, our God, to Thee we raise
This our Sacrifice of Praise.

For Thy Virgins' robes of snow,
For Thy Maiden Mother mild,
For Thyself, with hearts aglow,
Jesu, Victim undefiled,
Offer we at Thine own Shrine
Thyself, sweet Sacrament Divine.

NOTE: Some versions of the hymn used by different Christian denominations omit some verses and change the phrase "Christ, our God, to Thee we raise this our sacrifice of praise" to "Lord of all, to Thee we raise This our hymn of grateful praise", or "Lord of all, to thee we raise This our grateful psalm of praise" (Book of Common Praise), or "Father, unto thee we raise This our sacrifice of praise" (Songs of Praise). More recent alternatives include "Holy God, to thee we raise This our sacrifice of praise", "God creative, here we raise This our offering of praise", and "Holy Spirit, all our days, We would offer songs of praise". The Unitarian Universalist hymnal, Singing the Living Tradition (1993), has "Source of all, to thee we raise this, our hymn of grateful praise."

== Settings ==
English composer John Rutter's composition for SATB, SA, or TTBB choir with piano/organ or orchestra accompaniment is a widely performed choral setting of this text. Other settings include those by Andrew Carter and Philip Stopford.

Along with such hymns as "Come, Ye Thankful People, Come" and "We Gather Together", this is a hymn that is often sung during the Thanksgiving holiday period in many churches in America.
