= Geoffrey Turton Shaw =

English composer and musician

Geoffrey Shaw
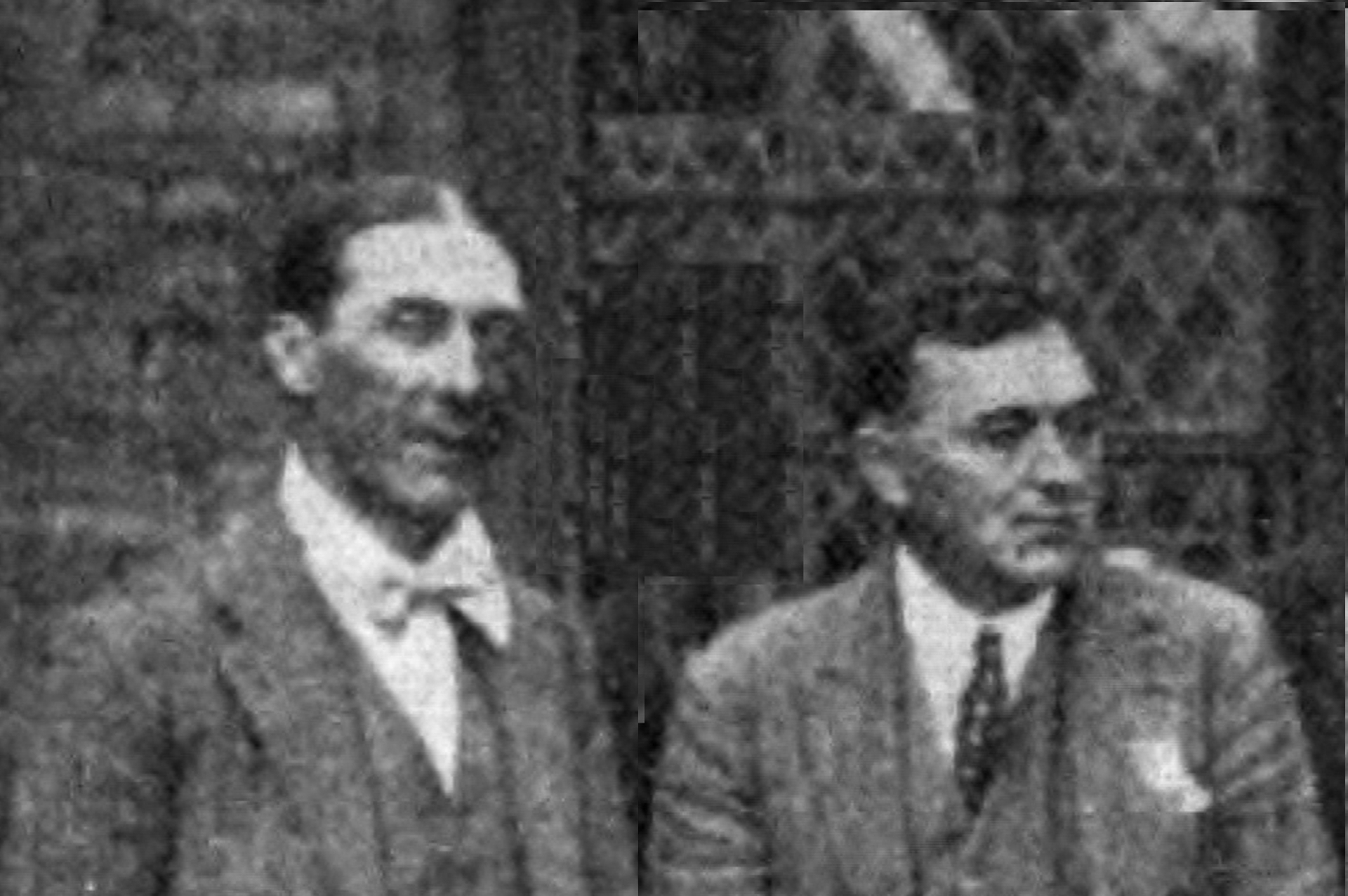

Background information
- Born: 14 November 1879; Clapham, London, England
- Died: 14 April 1943 (aged 63)

Geoffrey Turton Shaw (14 November 1879 – 14 April 1943) was an English composer and musician specialising in Anglican church music. After Cambridge, where he was an organ scholar, he became a schoolmaster, then a schools inspector, while producing a stream of compositions, arrangements, and published collections of music. He was awarded the Lambeth degree of Doctor of Music.

Shaw worked with his brother Martin Shaw, also a composer, while his son Sebastian was a Shakespearean actor who is remembered for the Star Wars role of Anakin Skywalker.

== Early life ==
Born at Clapham, South London, in 1879, Shaw was the son of James Fallas Shaw, a composer of church music and organist of Hampstead, and the younger brother of the composer Martin Shaw (1875–1958). Geoffrey became a chorister at St Paul's Cathedral under Sir George Martin and was then educated at Derby School and Gonville and Caius College, Cambridge. At Caius, he was an organ scholar, studied with Sir Charles Stanford and Charles Wood, and graduated BA in 1901 and MusB in 1902.

== Career ==
From 1902 to 1910, Shaw was a music master and Director of Music at Gresham's School in Holt, a role in which he was succeeded by Walter Greatorex, a fellow Old Derbeian. Steve Benson's History of Gresham's School notes:

Shaw was too fine a musician to be held for long, despite his love of Norfolk, and he went on to become an outstanding School Inspector.

Shaw was an inspector of music in London schools from 1911 to 1940, simultaneously holding several posts as an organist, and in 1920 was his brother Martin's successor as organist of St Mary's, Primrose Hill, remaining there until 1930. He was also Inspector of Music to the Board of Education from 1928 until his retirement in 1942. For some years he chaired the BBC's schools music sub-committee.

In his Board of Education work, Shaw worked to raise standards of musical education in schools and also supported popular organisations and training colleges. His unofficial activities included promoting summer schools for teachers, and he was in demand as an adjudicator at music festivals. He was the first adjudicator of the Thanet Competitive Musical Festival, founded in 1921.

As a composer, Shaw's work included choral works, anthems, hymn tunes and arrangements, a ballet called All at Sea, chamber pieces, orchestral works, and other songs, including part-songs and unison songs. Several descants by Shaw, Alan Gray and Ralph Vaughan Williams appear in Songs of Praise, one of the earliest hymnals to include such work. Shaw was an enthusiast for folk music and the work of Henry Purcell, and one of his aims was to restore the dignity of Christian music.

With his brother, Shaw edited song books. He was one of the editors of The Public School Hymn Book of 1919 and also published the Descant Hymn-Tune Book, in two volumes. With Percy Dearmer, Martin and Geoffrey Shaw had a significant influence on 20th-century church music.

Shaw's friend John Ireland composed the melody for My Song Is Love Unknown over lunch one day with Shaw, and at his suggestion.

In 1932, Cosmo Lang, Archbishop of Canterbury, awarded Shaw the honorary Lambeth degree of Doctor of Music. When Shaw died in 1943, he was cremated and his ashes buried at Golders Green Crematorium.

In 1947, a Geoffrey Shaw Memorial Fund was established for the benefit of talented instrumentalists under the age of eighteen, and there is now a Martin and Geoffrey Shaw Organ Scholarship at St Mary's, Primrose Hill.

== Marriage and children ==
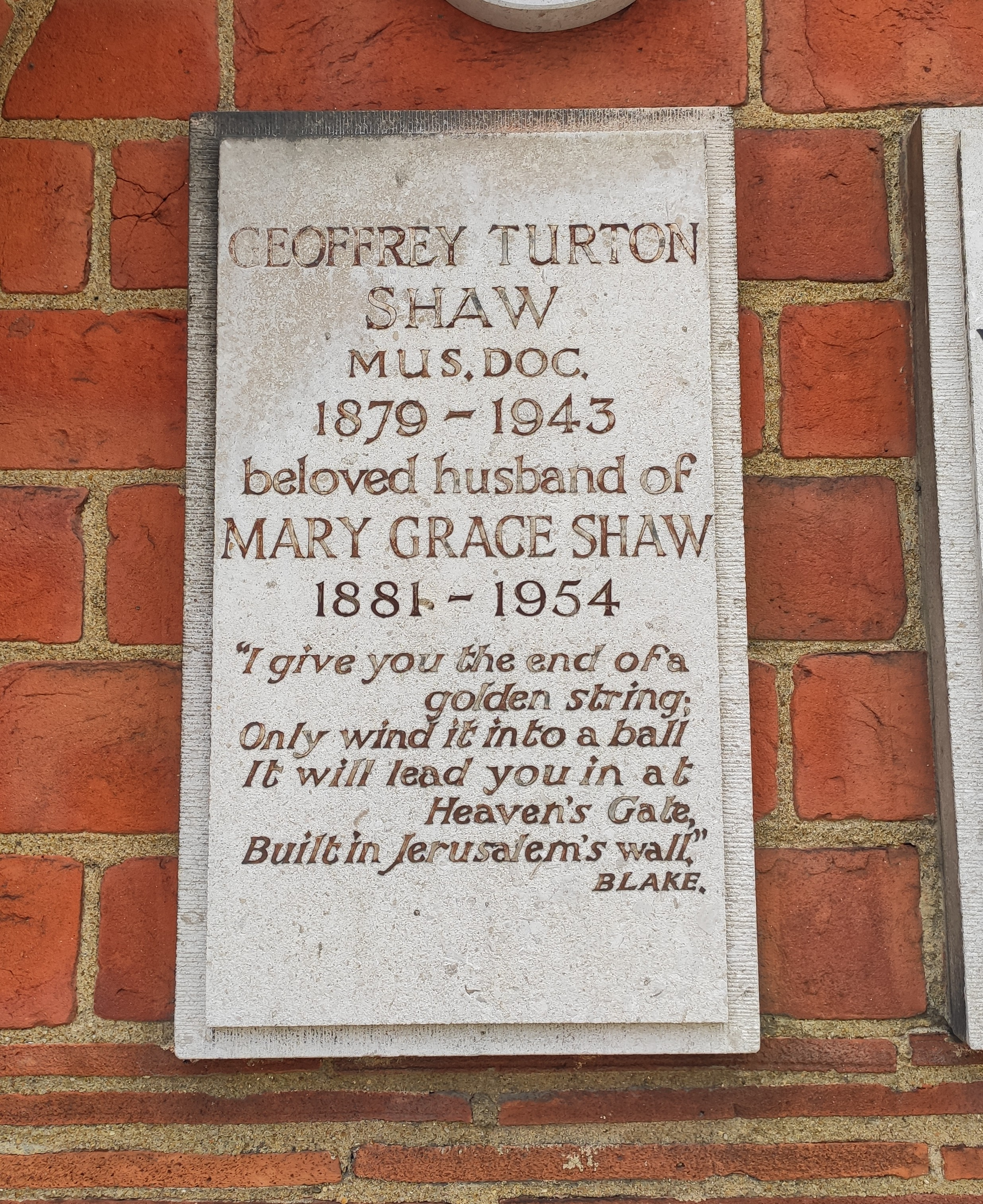
Plaque dedicated to Shaw and his wife at Golders Green Crematorium

Shaw was married to Mary Grace Shaw née Putley. He was the father of six children, including the actor Sebastian Shaw (1905–1994), best known for the role of Anakin Skywalker in Return of the Jedi. His other children were James, Peter, Susan, Margaret and Penelope. James, like his father a chorister of St Paul's Cathedral, read History at Caius, his father's Cambridge college, and was killed during the Second World War. Penelope Shaw became an actress. One of Shaw's great-grandchildren, Emma Bonner-Morgan, is a singer-songwriter and pianist.

== Selected publications ==
- The Public School Hymn Book (1919) (joint ed.)
- Before Bedtime: ten singing games (J. Curwen & Sons, 1919)
- Cramer's Library of String Music, edited by G. Shaw (J. B. Cramer & Co., 1923)
- The Descant Hymn-Tune Book: a collection of well-known tunes, arranged by G. Shaw (Novello and Co., 1925, 2 volumes)
- Twice 44 Sociable Songs, Collected and Arranged by G. Shaw (London: Hawkes & Son, 1928)
- Twice 20: Choral Songs for Choirs (1933)
- A Book of Hidden Tunes: Teacher's Book (London: Nelson, 1934)
- A Book of Hidden Tunes: Pupils' Book (London: Nelson, 1934)
- 4 Characteristic Sketches for Piano (Joseph Williams, 1936)
- Coronation Song Book for Schools, Compiled by G. Shaw (Novello and Co., 1937)
- Black Keys Duets for Pianoforte (London: Novello & Co., 1938)
- The New National Song Book (ed. with Charles Villiers Stanford) (London: Boosey & Hawkes, new edition 1938)
- Birds and Beasts: Six Pieces for Piano (J. Curwen & Sons, 1940)
- Twice 33 Carols for Home and Church Use, Arranged by Geoffrey Shaw (London: Hawkes & Son, 1942)
- The Geoffrey Shaw Song Book: Words by G. Shaw and Isaac Watts, with some traditional verses (J. Curwen & Sons, 1945)

== Selected compositions and arrangements ==
- All at Sea (ballet)
- Come away, Death, composed by Dr Arne, arranged by G. Shaw (Novello & Co., 1909)
- Hey Robin, jolly Robin (Part-song, words from Shakespeare's Twelfth Night, choral) (1912)
- The Bramble, a two-part song, words by Thomas Love Peacock (Akerman) (1914)
- The Cow, words by R. L. Stevenson (choruses for equal voices, piano) (J. Curwen & Sons, 1915)
- The Swing, words by R. L. Stevenson (unison voices, piano) (1915)
- Ask Me Why (words by Carew, three-part Song for equal voices) (1915)
- Crossing the Bar Unison Song, words by Tennyson (choruses for equal voices) (J. Curwen & Sons, 1915)
- Bed in Summer, unison song for children, words by Robert Louis Stevenson (choruses for equal voices) (1915)
- Hail, gladdening Light, anthem based on an old English carol tune, words from the Greek by John Keble (1917)
- As Joseph was a-walking, an old carol, two-part song (1918)
- The Campbells are comin', Scottish air, arranged with descant by G. Shaw (School Songs, 1921; Novello and Co., 1952)
- He wants not Friends that hath Thy Love, anthem, words by R. Baxter (Novello and Co., Novello's Octavo Anthems, 1923)
- The Day Draws on with Golden Light, Easter anthem, words 5th century, translated by T. A. L. (Novello and Co., Novello's Octavo Anthems, 1924)
- The Bay of Biscay, melody by J. Davy, arranged with descant by G. Shaw (Novello and Co., 1925)
- Early one Morning, arranged with descant by G. Shaw (Novello and Co., 1925) (also in Welsh, Yn gynnar un bore, words by Leslie Harries, Novello & Co., 1955)
- Glynthorpe, tune for Emily Brontë's No coward soul is mine (hymn for unison voices, organ or piano) (Songs of Praise, 1925)
- Choral Prelude for Organ on the Trinity Office Hymn (J. B. Cramer & Co., Cramer's Library of Organ Music, 1925)
- Annie Laurie, Scottish Air, arranged with descant by G. Shaw (Novello and Co., 1928)
- Fairlight (words by Christina Rossetti, Who has seen the wind?) (Songs of Praise, 1929)
- Caller Herrin', Scottish air by N. Gow, arranged with descant by G. Shaw (Novello and Co., 1931)
- The Girl I left behind me, English air, arranged with descant by G. Shaw (Novello and Co., 1931)
- The Harp that once through Tara's Halls, Irish air, words by Thomas Moore, arranged with descant by G. Shaw (Novello and Co., 1931)
- Cold's the Wind, Song, words by Thomas Dekker (Leonard, Gould & Bolttler, 1933)
- Fight the good Fight, unison song for massed voices, words by J. S. B. Monsell (Cramer's Library of Unison and Part Songs, 1933)
- Fantasia on Adeste Fideles, for the Organ (Novello & Co., Original Compositions for the Organ, 1935)
- Festival Suite No. 1 for Pianoforte (W. Paxton & Co., 1936)
- Ring Out, Ye Crystal Spheres (part song for SCTB) (Cramer, 1937)
- The Happy Day, unison song, words by M. Shaw (choruses for equal voices) (J. Curwen & Sons, 1938)
- A Child's Prayer, unison song, words by F. T. Palgrave (choruses for equal voices) (J. Curwen & Sons, 1939)
- England's Lane (arrangement from traditional)
- For the Beauty of the Earth (hymn, words by Folliott Sandford Pierpoint)
- Motet on the hymn Adoramus te
- The Snow Lies Thick
- Prelude on an Irish Hymn Tune
- London Birds (words by Margaret Shaw, arranged for unison voices with piano)
- Funeral Music (the 3rd mode melody) for organ (Thomas Tallis, arranged by Martin and Geoffrey Shaw)
- Gossip Joan (arranged for piano and unison voice, with descant)
- How Far is it to Bethlehem? (for SATB, words by Frances Chesterton)
- Hail Gladdening Light (Soprano, alto, tenor, bass, organ)
- The Day Draws on with Golden Light (for SATB chorus)
- O Be Joyful in the Lord (for SATB chorus with organ acc.)
- Magnificat and Nunc Dimittis (simple setting)
- Variations on an Old English Melody ('Heartsease') (organ)
- Variations on an Irish Melody (organ)
- While Shepherds Watched (for SATB/descant/organ)
- Benedicite, Omnia Opera (SATB/organ)
- The Office for the Holy Communion (unison/SATB/organ)
- In Derry Vale (The Londonderry Air) (unison with descant/piano)
- Good King Wenceslas (SATB/piano)
- Spring Bursts Today (SATB/piano)
- Truth (SATB/piano)
- Worship (SATB/piano)
- O Dear! What Can the Matter Be? (unison with descant/piano)
- In the Stilly Night (unison with descant/piano)
