= Last verse harmonisation =

Last verse harmonisation is a technique of hymn accompaniment used by church organists to vary the harmony of a hymn, during the last verse whilst the melody remains unchanged, though sometimes embellished.

If the congregation is led by a choir, then the choir will usually sing in unison during the last verse, as opposed to in parts (usually SATB) for the other verses, and the trebles or sopranos (or occasionally tenors) may sing a descant. The purpose of last verse harmonisation is to add interest, variation and excitement to a hymn tune. Organists recommend it as a technique which encourages the congregation to sing. More experienced organists with a greater understanding of harmony will usually improvise the last verse, whereas beginners are likely to use harmonisations that have either been included in the hymn book, or published in a collection of harmonisations. When a descant is sung, the organist must either keep to the original harmony, or use an alternative one that has been written specifically for use in conjunction with the descant, as the melody of the descant may not sound right with other harmonies.

== Characteristics ==
Usually the organ accompaniment to the last verse of a hymn tune will be heavier (in musical terms) than the standard harmony. Typically it will include lower or more profound bass notes, which will almost certainly be played on the pedalboard, and more frequent use of secondary dominants, particularly over chromatic movement in the bass. Often there are more notes in each chord—often five or more as opposed to four or fewer in the SATB arrangement. Occasionally the harmony will differ entirely from the standard arrangement in places, giving the melody completely different effect. A notable example is David Willcocks' harmonisation of the seventh verse of the famous hymn tune "Adeste Fideles". This opens with the organ playing the melody in unison at three pitches (each an octave apart; the lowest played on the pedalboard), which is another popular technique of last verse harmonisation.

== Performance ==
Organists will usually vary their use of stops throughout a hymn tune, including changing them for the last verse. They will usually pull out stops that emphasise the bass-line, or that are particularly loud, rich or harsh sounding. If the organ has a tuba stop, then this will often be used with the pedalboard, as it provides the loudest bass notes on the organ, and reeds are also useful (if available). Sometimes hymn books and other compilations of tunes (such as Carols for Choirs) that publish last verse harmonisations will indicate suitable stops to be used, but this is ultimately a choice for the organist.

== See also ==
- Anglican church music
- Congregational singing
- Descants
- Hymn tunes
- Organ
