= Quem terra, pontus, sidera =

"Quem terra, pontus, sidera", also known by its more ancient name, "Quem terra, pontus, aethera", is a latin-language Christian hymn in long metre, in honour of the virgin Mary, mother of Jesus, attributed to Venantius Fortunatus.

The Roman Breviary divides it into two parts: the first, beginning with "Quem terra, pontus, sidera", assigned to Matins; the second, beginning with "O gloriosa virginum", similarly assigned to Lauds. Both parts conclude with the doxology of Marian hymns, "Jesu tibi sit gloria etc." As found in breviaries following the reforms of Urban VIII and preceding the reforms of Paul VI, the hymns are revisions, in the interest of classical prosody, of the older hymn, "Quem terra, pontus, æthera", found in many old breviaries and in manuscripts dating from the eighth century. Its ancient form was restored in the modern Liturgy of the Hours. In the Cistercian office it was sung officially at Compline during Advent. Sometimes it was divided into two parts, as in the Roman Breviary, the second part beginning with "O gloriosa Domina" (or "femina").
