= Sidus (Corinthia) =

Coordinates: 37°54′58″N 23°04′47″E

Sidus or Sidous (Ancient Greek: Σιδοῦς) was a village in ancient Corinthia known primarily for its strategic location and role in regional conflicts.

== History ==
During the Corinthian War (392 BC), Sidus was seized by the Lacedaemonians (Spartans), along with the nearby town of Crommyon. However, it was later recaptured by the Athenian general Iphicrates.

== Location ==
The site of the ancient settlement of Sidus is believed to be located near the modern-day village of Sousaki in the regional unit of Corinthia, Peloponnese, Greece.

== Economy ==
Like much of ancient Corinthia, its economy was likely tied to agriculture and trade, leveraging its access to both the Saronic and Corinthian Gulfs.
