= Sylvia Kenney =

American musicologist (1922–1968)

- Born: November 27, 1922; Tampa, Florida, U.S.
- Died: October 31, 1968 (aged 45); Northampton, Massachusetts, U.S.
- Occupations: Musicologist; violist
- Awards: Guggenheim Fellowship (1963)

Academic background
- Education: Wellesley College; Yale School of Music; Université libre de Bruxelles
- Thesis: The 'Contenance angloise' in the Music of Walter Frye and his contemporaries (1955)
- Doctoral advisor: Leo Schrade

Academic work
- Discipline: Musicology
- Sub-discipline: Classical music
- Institutions: Wells College; Bryn Mawr College; University of California, Los Angeles; University of California at Santa Barbara; Smith College

Sylvia Wisdom Kenney (November 27, 1922 – October 31, 1968) was an American musicologist. She originally performed as a violist and played for the United Service Organizations in World War II. After completing her graduate studies, she worked in music cataloguing and later as a professor at Bryn Mawr College, University of California, Los Angeles, University of California at Santa Barbara, and Smith College. A 1963 Guggenheim Fellow, her publications included Catalog of the Emilie and Karl Riemenschneider Memorial Bach Library (1960) and Walter Frye and the Contenance Angloise (1964).

== Biography ==
Sylvia Wisdom Kenney was born on November 27, 1922, in Tampa, Florida. Her father Arthur W. Kenney worked as a chemist for DuPont. and her mother Marion Coes spent World War II as a WAVES officer. The family later lived in Wilmington, Delaware. She obtained her Bachelor of Arts degree from Wellesley College in 1944.

Kenney originally performed as a violist. Her music teacher was Max Aronoff. The Portland Press Herald said that Kenney "possesses an inborn love of the old masters, which gives to her work a depth of interpretation both mature and musicianly". During World War II, she was a violist for the United Service Organizations, appearing in shows throughout East Asia. After the war, she studied at the Yale School of Music and got her BMus there in 1946.

She returned to Yale for her graduate studies, obtaining her MA in 1948 and PhD in 1955. Her doctoral dissertation, The 'Contenance angloise' in the Music of Walter Frye and his contemporaries, was supervised by Leo Schrade. In 1950, she went to Belgium as a Fulbright Fellow in music, and she studied at the Université libre de Bruxelles, where Charles Van den Borren, Albert Vander Linden, and Robert Wangermée were her mentors. In 1952, she worked at the Library of Congress' copyright division as a cataloguer in the music section. From 1952 to 1954, she was a music instructor at Wells College, where she was also head of the music library.

She went to Baldwin–Wallace College to work on a catalog of the college's Bach collection; it was published as Catalog of the Emilie and Karl Riemenschneider Memorial Bach Library (1960). She was editor for The Collected Works of Walter Frye, published by the AIM the same year. In 1963, she was awarded a Guggenheim Fellowship to do research on the motet. In 1964, her dissertation was republished as a book, Walter Frye and the Contenance Angloise. Philip Keppler called both her Walter Frye books "monuments to scholarly exactitude and indispensable contributions to our knowledge of early English influence on the music of the Continent".

In 1957, she began working as an assistant professor at Bryn Mawr College, and she became associate professor in 1963. In 1961, she worked at University of California, Los Angeles as an assistant professor of music during the summer session. In October 1964, she was appointed to the University of California at Santa Barbara Department of Music, becoming an associate professor there. She moved to Smith College in 1966 and became professor of music history.

Kenney died on October 31, 1968, in Cooley Dickinson Hospital in Northampton, Massachusetts, two days after falling ill at a Detroit Symphony Orchestra concert.

== Bibliography ==
- (as editor) Catalog of the Emilie and Karl Riemenschneider Memorial Bach Library (1960)
- Walter Frye and the Contenance Angloise (1964)
