= Sidussa =

Greek colony in ancient Ionia

Coordinates: 38°39′34″N 26°30′56″E

Sidussa (Ancient Greek: Σίδουσσα or Σιδούσση) was a small town of Ionia, belonging to the territory of Erythrae, noted by Thucydides as a strong place, like Pteleum. Pliny the Elder describes it as an island off the coast of Erythrae. It is probable that the place also bore the name of Sidus (Σιδοῦς), as Stephanus of Byzantium mentions a town of this name in the territory of Erythrae.

Sidussa was a member of the Delian League since it is mentioned in tribute records to Athens at least between the years 450/49 and 430/29 BCE.

Thucydides places it in the territory of Erythrae and says that, like Pteleum it was a fortified place that was used by the Athenian army under the command of Leon and Diomedon to attack positions on Chios in the year 412 BCE.

Sidussa's location is tentatively accepted as at Büyük Ada, İzmir Province, Turkey.
