= Hymn tune =

Musical melody of a Christian hymn

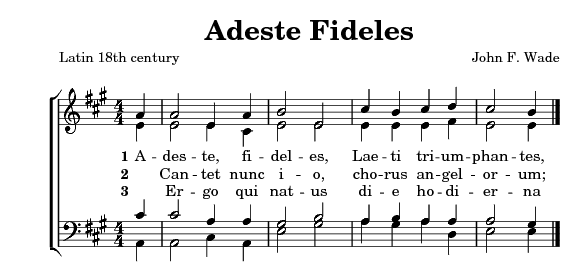
Homorhythmic (i.e., hymn-style) arrangement of a traditional piece entitled "Adeste Fideles", in standard two-staff format for mixed voices.

A hymn tune is the melody of a musical composition to which a hymn text is sung. Musically speaking, a hymn is generally understood to have four-part (or more) harmony, and a fast harmonic rhythm (chords change frequently), with or without refrain or chorus.

From the late 16th century in England and Scotland, when most people were not musically literate and learned melodies by rote, it was a common practice to sing a new text to a hymn tune the singers already knew which had a suitable meter and character.

Often there are many hymn tunes which might fit a particular hymn: a hymn in Long Metre might be sung to any hymn tune in Long Metre, but the tunes might be very different: compare tunes that have been used for centuries for hymns such as Te lucis ante terminum, on one hand, and an arrangement of the calypso tune used with Jamaica Farewell, on the other.

== Hymnal editors ==
Editors bring extensive knowledge of theology, poetry, and music to the process of compiling a new hymnal. They seek texts that can explain complex theological concepts to lay people, and they strive to partner those texts with tunes which can easily be sung by the non-professional musicians of a congregation.

When editors choose a text for the planned collection, it may already be sung to a tune that supports its meaning, catches its spirit, and allows for congregational participation. This pairing may be used elsewhere, even ecumenically recognized, appearing in many other hymnals. However, if the editors think a hymn has been linked to an unsuitable tune, they can select another tune for it. They may consider the interpretive support given by the tune to the text. Editors must consider whether the important words in the text fall on stressed notes, whether climax points in the ideas correspond with musical climaxes, and whether the music's tempo matches the style of the text.

== Pairing texts to tunes ==
Often the author of a text has neither composed nor selected a tune for that text, so it is up to the editor to choose a suitable tune. If the meter of a text is regular, the editor can choose a suitable existing tune in that meter (or maybe suggest alternative tunes). Often there are several possibilities. The user might also find other possible tunes for that hymn by referring to the hymnal's metrical index.

In The Anatomy of Hymnody, Austin C. Lovelace explores the relevance of the meter to a text.

A meter of few syllables, perhaps with a trochaic stress pattern, fits best an exhortive or forceful declamation of ideas. A stirring, motivating text will fit this meter well. Using a more lyrical meter suggests a more expansive or introspective treatment of ideas. An author may have superb ideas, but may have chosen a meter which exhorts when it should be expansive, or is solid when it should be introspective. In such cases the editor is challenged to achieve an overall fit which does not distract from the message of the text.

Editorial skills are evident in the complex credits of some hymns. For the well-loved and great hymn, "All Creatures of Our God and King", the words were written by William H. Draper and first published in 1919, based on a 13th-century text by Francis of Assisi, with further adaptations made in 1987. It is usually sung to the tune Lasst uns erfreuen, first printed in the Geistliches Kirchengesangbuch, dated 1623, and is presented with a harmonization by Ralph Vaughan Williams, dated 1906.

Some texts become associated with several tunes. Conversely, for different reasons, some tunes are used for numerous texts. Tunes which are very singable and easy for a congregation to pick up, and do not have musical demands which would interfere with understanding and assimilating the ideas of a text, can be used to set two or three texts in a hymnal, when the editors see that as advantageous. Wareham (LM, melody by William Knapp (1698–1768), alt., harm. Hymns Ancient and Modern, 1875, after James Turle (1802–1882)), is used for three different hymns in Hymnal 1982. It has supported more than 20 texts in various hymnals.

=== Naming ===
The practice of naming hymn tunes developed to help identify a particular tune. The name was chosen by the compiler of the tune book or hymnal or by the composer. The majority of names have a connection with the composer, such as Michael, chosen by Herbert Howells to commemorate his deceased son, and many are place names, such as Aberystwyth and Down Ampney. Most hymnals provide an alphabetical hymn tune index by name and a hymn tune index by meter.

In some instances a particular text and tune have an almost exclusive partnership with each other, such as Reginald Heber's text "Holy, Holy, Holy!" and John Bacchus Dykes's tune Nicaea. In other instances a text may use a variety of tunes, such as "O for a Thousand Tongues to Sing" sung to any of Lyngham, Oxford New, Arden, Lydia, Richmond, Azmon, or University. In yet other instances a tune may partner several texts, such as Dix for "As with Gladness Men of Old", "Christ, Whose Glory Fills the Skies", "God of Mercy, God of Grace", "Lord, to You Immortal Praise", and "For the Beauty of the Earth".

By contrast, in Germany and Scandinavia, tune names were not typically used even when a hymn tune was used for more than one text. The custom in such cases was to use part of the first line of the first text with which the tune was associated as a name for the tune: for example Lasst Uns Erfreuen ("Let us rejoice" / All Creatures of Our God and King), Gelobt Sei Gott ("[May] God be praised" / Good Christian men, rejoice and sing) and Was lebet, was schwebet (O Worship the Lord in the Beauty of Holiness). Renaming of tunes occurs from time to time, when a tune is chosen to be printed in a hymnal. When chorales were introduced in England during the eighteenth century, these tunes were sometimes given English-style tune names.

The Ravenscroft Psalter of 1621 was the first English book which specified, by name, which tune should set each text. This followed the procedure used for the first time in the 1616 Scottish Psalter. In this early time of defining text/tune marriages, editors of different psalters were apt to use different names for the same tune. For example, The French Tune, in the Scottish Psalter (1564), was the same tune as Dundee in the Ravenscroft Psalter. Common practice nowadays is for the composer of a tune to name it.

== Performance ==
Typically, worship services in churches and synagogues include hymns which are sung by the congregation, accompanied by organ, or piano, and/or sometimes by guitars or other instruments. Details of performance vary depending on the designated style of the service, or by the hymns themselves. Some hymns specify unison singing, and other hymns are sung in parts (usually soprano, alto, tenor, bass). It is common practice for a congregation to sing all the hymns in unison, but in some traditions part singing is encouraged.

Sometimes, especially on longer texts, variety in the performance is introduced. Varied performance practices may include:

- varied harmonization for a stanza
- descant sung by sopranos, above the melody
- "Fauxbourdon" with the melody sung by tenors, and the harmonies sung by the other parts
- a modulation (music) (usually for the last stanza) into the next higher key
- A last verse harmonisation consisting of an embellished organ harmony, most of the choir singing in unison, and perhaps a descant

Other possibilities for varied performance can be invited through explanation either in the service bulletin or through verbal instruction by the pastor or the minister of music. Combining some or all of these and can add interest to singing while enhancing the sense of the text. For example:

- a stanza sung only by the choir
- a stanza sung only by the congregation
- a stanza sung only by men
- a stanza sung only by women
- a stanza sung only by Cantoris (north side)
- a stanza sung only by Decani (south side)

Some hymn tunes lend themselves to being sung in canon.

== History ==
=== Origins ===
The Book of Psalms has sometimes been called the first hymn book. Some psalms are headed with instructions relating to their musical performance, music to which they were "married," even though no music is included with the texts. Psalters contained metrical versifications of the psalms. Using a regular meter, authors would translate the psalms into the vernacular, and create versions which could be set to music for the people to sing.

St. Paul encourages Christians to "Let the word of Christ dwell in you richly in all wisdom; teaching and admonishing one another in psalms and hymns and spiritual songs, singing with grace in your hearts to the Lord" (Col. 3:16), "[s]peaking to yourselves in psalms and hymns and spiritual songs, singing and making melody in your heart to the Lord." (Eph. 5:19). In 313 AD, the Emperor Constantine issued the Edict of Milan, which "... gave the Christians the right to practice religion openly." At that time the language of the people was Latin. Use of Latin continued in the Roman Catholic Church long after it ceased to be the vernacular. By the time of Martin Luther in the early 16th century, the singing was still in Latin but was done by choirs of priests and monks, although the choirs sometimes included a few lay musicians as well.

Hymnals evolved from psalters, in that hymns are songs for the congregation and choir to sing, but go beyond metrical recasting of only psalm texts. In early hymnals, only texts were printed. By the mid 18th century, hymnal editors began marrying particular tunes, by name, to individual texts. A century later, in the 1861 (first) edition of the English Hymns Ancient and Modern, for the first time, the music was printed with its text on the hymnal page. Many marriages from that book became and remain ecumenically endorsed, including those where a tune was composed and appeared in print for the first time in that 1861 edition. Heber's text, "Holy, Holy, Holy" had first appeared in Selection of Psalms and Hymns for the Parish Church of Banbury, 3rd edition, 1826. Nicaea (1861) was written by J. B. Dykes to set it "for the first edition of Hymns A & M."

=== The Reformation ===
As part of his efforts at reform, after Martin Luther prepared a version of the Mass in Latin, he prepared a version in German, adapting parts of the liturgical texts of the Mass as chorales in the vernacular which could be sung and understood by the congregation. Luther arranged the music for some of these by adapting the music of existing plainsong melodies; he set other texts to newly composed tunes composed by others, or by himself. An example of the latter is the tune he composed for his German paraphrase of Psalm 46, "Ein feste Burg ist unser Gott" ("A Mighty Fortress Is Our God"). Nicholas Temperley wrote in The Hymn Tune Index that Luther "wished his congregations to take part in the singing, but in general they failed to do so" and "It was the Calvinist, or 'Reformed', branches of Protestantism that succeeded in establishing congregation hymn singing in worship." Luther (1483–1546) posted his theses against Roman Church practices, particularly "indulgences", in 1517, which signalled the start of the Reformation, "...but six or seven years passed after the inception of his Reformation before he gave his thought to hymns.... Luther wished to refine the worship of the Church by excluding what he thought were needless complications while retaining, through the use of music, the essential spirit of Christian devotion as enshrined in the church's tradition.... The year 1524 saw the first official Luther hymnals." Luther wanted the congregation to participate in singing, with German texts sung to tunes straightforward enough for ordinary people to sing. "Luther himself wrote many new religious texts to be used with well-known German folk songs. Vom Himmel hoch is one of these."

Luther was a gifted and well-trained musician. He composed and found hymn tunes which were accessible for ordinary people to sing, and "... at the same time he encouraged church choirs to continue the tradition of polyphonic motets within the Lutheran Mass. He used various textures and styles of music in ways which were most appropriate and effective for each." Luther also adapted the music of existing plainsong melodies as hymn tunes. Families enjoyed singing hymns in parts in their homes, for the family's enjoyment and edification, but unison singing was the custom in church.

The Reformed Church and the (French) Genevan Psalter were the result of work by John Calvin (1509–1564). His profound reverence for the biblical text "...caused him to insist that public praise in church should be confined to the language of the Bible, adapted to the minimum extent required for congregational singing. He was "... the architect of the tradition of metrical psalmody."

Calvin heard Lutheran hymn singing while he served Minister of the Reformed Church of Strasbourg (1538–41). In fact, Routley says, "[M]etrical psalmody was really born [in Strasbourg] rather than in Geneva."

Clement Marot (c. 1497–1544) was a French Court poet in Strassbourg, who had begun setting psalms in metrical versions before Calvin met him. Although Marot remained a Catholic, Calvin included Marot's psalm versions in the Psalter. The first Genevan Psalter, 1542, contained six psalms by Calvin and 30 by Marot. The Genevan Psalter of 1562 contained all 150 psalms, and included the works of Calvin's successor, Theodore de Beza (1509–1565).

Calvin did not approve of free religious texts (hymns) for use in church; the Bible was the only source of texts he approved (exclusive psalmody). Calvin endorsed only singing of metrical psalm texts, only in unison, only a cappella, with no harmonization and no accompanying instruments of any kind. Tunes for the metrical psalm versions came from several men, including Louis Bourgeois (c. 1501 – c. 1561), and Claude Goudemil (c. 1525–1572). There were 110 different meters used for the texts in Calvin's Psalter, and 125 different tunes to set them. The music was very difficult; the long tunes were hard for ordinary people to grasp. But later adaptations (and simplifications) of these tunes have added to current day hymn tunes repertoire.

=== English hymnody ===
The earliest English psalters included a few tunes in regular meters, which could be used to sing all the psalms in the psalter. Which tune was sung was determined by the fit of the meter. The Ravenscroft Psalter of 1621 was the first English book which "married," specified by name, which tune should set each text. In that early time of defining text/tune marriages, editors of different psalters sometimes used different names for the same tune. For example, The French Tune, in the Scottish Psalter (1564), is the same tune as Dundee in the Ravenscroft Psalter.

Routley states that metrical psalmody was actually the first English Protestant hymnody. England's Reformation began when King Henry VIII separated the English church from the Catholic Church in Rome in 1532. King Henry's heir was King Edward VI, who ascended to the throne in 1547. Thomas Sternhold (d. 1549), Groom of the Royal Wardrobe at the end of Henry VIII's reign and during Edward VI's, "...began metricizing psalms for the edification of the young new king (ten years old when he came to the throne in 1547: sixteen when he died in 1553)." Sternhold's work paralleled Marot's efforts in the French Court; Sternhold's "...strong puritan strain moved him to replace with sacred songs the trivial secular music that was the Court's normal entertainment; this led him to versify certain Psalms in the ballad metre that would enable them to be sung to tunes already known." (Forest Green, Kingsfold, etc.). The ballad meter, "which Sternhold used very nearly without variation," had 4 iambic lines of 14 syllables, which breaks down to 8686 8686 (our Double Common Meter DCM or CMD). Also, a simpler "half length" tune evolved, now described as common meter (CM = 8686). The English aimed at a Psalter of all 150 psalms, virtually all in ballad meter. Sternhold started the task, writing a total of 37 by the time he died, when John Hopkins took over the work. .... In the year of [Sternhold's] death, a little book without music containing 44 psalms was published, of which 36 were by Sternhold and eight by his collaborator John Hopkins (d. 1570).

Progress on the Psalter was interrupted when King Edward died in 1553, and his elder half sister Mary I became queen. She tried to reinstate Catholicism as the State religion. Churchmen whose lives were threatened fled to the Continent, some ending up in Geneva, where they encountered the 1551 Genevan Psalter and the congregational singing which it supported. When Elizabeth I ascended the throne after her sister's death in 1558, the exiled churchmen returned to England, bringing them an Anglo-Genevan Psalter containing all the psalms plus a few tunes to set them, along with their desire to add congregational singing to church services. At that point work continued with the Sternhold and Hopkins Psalter, adding psalms to it from the Anglo-Genevan Psalter. The Complete Psalter was published in 1562 by John Daye. "It is at this point important to remember that all these versions of the Psalter, up to and including 1562, were published for private use. There was not, by 1562, strictly a 'Church of England' that could authorize the use of it in church."

The question of "authorisation" of the Sternhold and Hopkins Psalter for use in church services is discussed at length in John Julian's Dictionary of Hymnology; actually, the psalter was used in church whether it was ever officially authorized or not. "Few books have had so long a career of influence. With the growing Puritanism psalm-singing came to be esteemed the most divine part of God's public service."

=== Later developments ===
Books did not print the music with texts in hymnals until the middle 19th century. Tunes were printed separately in tune books. Some of those printed in America in the 19th century (for example, Lowell Mason's, or George Root's) use four staff systems. The tune name, but no composer credit, appears above each tune. The melody of the tune appears in the tenor (fauxbourdon), often with the first stanza words, printed above the tenor staff.

During the decade 1791–1800, more than 8,000 hymn tunes were printed in Great Britain and between 7,000 and 8,000 were printed in the United States; during the decade 1801–1810, about 11,000 hymn tunes were printed in Great Britain, while more than 15,000 were printed in the United States. The total number of hymn tunes published with English-language texts in publications from 1535 up to and including 1820 is recorded as 159,123.

The early Methodist movement provides an example of early hymnals published in editions that contained only texts. The co-founders, John Wesley and his brother Charles Wesley, published several text-only collections, culminating in A Collection of Hymns, for the Use of the People Called Methodists, in 1780. John Wesley published tune books separately, culminating in Sacred Harmony, in 1780. In 1786, with the fifth edition of the text-only Collection, Wesley indicated at the head of each hymn the tune to which he intended it to be sung. Among the tunes in Sacred Harmony that are still in use are Derby, Helmsley, and Savannah. Accompanists to hymn singing had a tune book, a volume with a collection of tunes, most without words, the exception being the occasional lyric when underlay of words to the music was ambiguous. An example of this was The Bristol Tune Book. As more people became musically literate, it became more common to print the melody, or both melody and harmony in hymnals. Contemporary practice in the U.S. and Canada is to print hymn tunes so that lyrics underlie the music; the more common practice in the UK is to print the hymn tunes on one page, and the hymn text either below, or on facing pages.

Among twentieth-century developments was the publishing of The English Hymnal in 1906 under the music editorship of Ralph Vaughan Williams. More recently, ethnic hymns and tunes have been included, descants have been added for some hymns, freer song-like styles have been accepted, and accompaniments by guitar and/or other instruments have been notated.

== See also ==
- Common Metre
- Foot (prosody)
- List of hymns by Martin Luther
- Long Metre
- Metre (hymn)
- Metre (poetry)
- Short Metre
- Sacred Harp
- Shape note
