= Folliott Sandford Pierpoint =

English hymnist and poet

Folliott Sandford Pierpoint (7 October 1835 – 10 March 1917) was a hymnodist and poet.

Born at Spa Villa, Bath, England, he was educated at Queens' College, Cambridge. Pierpoint was a classics schoolmaster and a devout Tractarian. He taught at Somersetshire College, spending most of his life in Bath and the south-west.

He published "The Chalice of Nature and Other Poems", republished in 1878 as "Songs of Love", "The Chalice of Nature", and "Lyra Jesu". He also contributed hymns to "The Churchman's Companion", "The Lyra Eucharistica", and others.

His most famous hymn is "For the Beauty of the Earth", which he wrote in 1864 at age 29.

Pierpoint died in 1917 at age 82.
