= Metre (hymn) =

Pattern of syllables in the stanzas of hymns

A hymn metre (US: meter) indicates the number of syllables for the lines in each stanza (verse) of a hymn. This provides a means of marrying the hymn's text with an appropriate hymn tune for singing.

== Hymn and poetic metre ==
In the English language hymns occur in a limited variety of poetic metres. The hymn "Amazing Grace" exemplifies a standard form, with a four-line stanza, in which lines with four stressed syllables alternate with lines with three stressed syllables; stressed syllables are rendered in bold.

Amazing grace, how sweet the sound
that saved a wretch like me.
I once was lost, but now am found,
was blind, but now I see.

To put it more technically, such hymns have couplets with four iambic metrical feet in the first and third lines, and three in the second and fourth. If one counted all syllables, not just stressed syllables, such hymns follow what is called an 86.86 pattern, with lines of eight syllables alternating with lines of six syllables. This form is also known as common metre.

By contrast most hymns in an 87.87 pattern are trochaic, with strong-weak syllable pairs:

Love divine, all loves excelling,
joy of heav'n to earth come down,...

In practice many hymns conform to one of a relatively small number of metres (syllable patterns), and within the most commonly used ones there is a general convention as to whether its stress pattern is iambic or trochaic (or perhaps dactylic, such as Great Is Thy Faithfulness). It is rare to find any significant metrical substitution in a well-written hymn; indeed, such variation usually indicates a poorly constructed text.

== Terminology and abbreviations ==
Most hymnals include a metrical index of the book's tunes. A hymn may be sung to any tune in the same metre, as long as the poetic foot (such as iambic, trochaic) also conforms.

All metres can be represented numerically, for example "Abide With Me" which is 10.10.10.10. Some of the most frequently encountered however are instead referred to by names:

- C.M., or CM— Common metre, 8.6.8.6; a quatrain (four-line stanza) with alternating lines of iambic tetrameter and iambic trimeter, which rhymes in the second and fourth lines and sometimes in the first and third.
- L.M., or LM— Long metre, 8.8.8.8; a quatrain in iambic tetrameter, which rhymes in the second and fourth lines and often in the first and third.
- S.M., or SM— Short metre, 6.6.8.6; iambic lines in the first, second, and fourth are in trimeter, and the third in tetrameter, which rhymes in the second and fourth lines and sometimes in the first and third. "Blest Be the Tie that Binds" is an example of a hymn in short metre.

Two verses may be joined and sung to a tune of double the length:

- D.C.M. (also C.M.D., or CMD)—Doubled CM, 8.6.8.6.8.6.8.6.
- D.L.M. (also L.M.D., or LMD)—Doubled LM, 8.8.8.8.8.8.8.8.
- 8.7.8.7.D—equivalent to two verses of 8.7.8.7., either trochaic or iambic.

English minister and hymn writer Isaac Watts, who wrote hundreds of hymns and was instrumental in the widespread use of hymns in public worship in England, is credited with popularizing and formalizing these metres, which were based on English folk poems, particularly ballads.

A few hymns have an inconsistent metrical pattern across their verses; one well-known example is "O Come, All Ye Faithful". Such a metre is described as '"irregular".

=== Local and historic variation ===
While the terminology above enjoys widespread agreement across the English-speaking world, there is some regional variation. Even within a region there may be historical variation and development. For example, some metre names no longer widely used includes:

- P.M. or PM— Peculiar metre; formerly used for irregular, rare, or one-of-a-kind metres in a hymnal. (Note: The metrical index of the 1941 LCMS The Lutheran Hymnal has several single-item metrical categories, and lacks a PM category. Their 1982 Lutheran Worship, however, introduces a new PM category, although still retaining several explicit single-item metrical categories. Their 2006 Lutheran Service Book maintains a similar PM and methodology.) (Note: An example is the 12.9.12.9 CAPTAIN KIDD ("What Wondrous Love Is This"). The Presbyterian Hymnal lists it in the numerical part of the index.) (Note: In Christian Heinrich Rinck's "Choräle für die Orgel und für die englische Kirche op. 119", Darmstadt 1832 (Yale University LM2093, nr. 4) P.M. is given to the hymntune Hanover by William Croft.)
- L.P.M. or LPM— Long Particular Metre, may refer to a six-line stanza of iambic tetrameter 8.8.8.8.8.8,
- H.M., or HM— Hallelujah metre, may sometimes be used in reference to 66.66.88,
- 50th— 10.10.10.10.10.10
- 104th— 10.10.11.11
- 112th— 6.6.6.6.8.8
- 124th— 10.10.10.10.10
- 148th— 6.6.6.6.4.4.4.4

The latter metres are named for the metres of metrical psalms.

== See also ==
- Foot (prosody)
- Hymn tune
- Metre (poetry)
- Trochaic septenarius
