= Long metre =

Poetic metre

Long metre or long measure, abbreviated as L.M. or LM, is a poetic metre consisting of four-line stanzas, or quatrains, in iambic tetrameter with alternate rhyme pattern ABAB. The term is also used in the closely related area of hymn metres. When the poem is used as a sung hymn, the metre of the text is denoted by the syllable count of each line; for long metre, the count is denoted by 8.8.8.8, 88.88, or 88 88, depending on style.

== History ==
Poets and composers have used long metre for more than a millennium: Venantius Fortunatus (c. 530 – c. 600/609) wrote "Vexilla regis", and probably also wrote "Quem terra, pontus, aethera", both of which are in long metre. Metrical psalters include many such tunes, some of which are still sung today, such as "All people that on Earth do dwell", a paraphrase of Psalm 100 sung to a tune that first appeared in the Genevan Psalters of 16th century. Many church hymns are also based on long metre tunes, such as the Good Friday hymn "When I Survey the Wondrous Cross".

== Related metres ==
Related to long metre are other metres: long metre double, 88 88 88 88, as in the traditional Irish tune "St. Patrick", which has been used with the hymn "I bind unto myself today", "St. Patrick's Breastplate", translated by Cecil Frances Alexander; and long particular metre, 88 88 88, as in the tune "Melita", composed by John Bacchus Dykes, which has been used with the hymn "Eternal Father, strong to save", the Navy Hymn, by William Whiting.

== See also ==
- Foot (prosody)
- Hymn tune
- Metre (hymn)
- Metre (poetry)
