= Nun saget Dank und lobt den Herren =

Christian hymn in German

- Christian hymn
- Written: 1951
- Text: by Peter Enderlin
- Language: German
- Based on: Psalm 118 in the Genevan Psalter, translated by Ambrosius Lobwasser
- Meter: 9 8 9 8 9 8 9 8
- Melody: by Guillaume Franc and Loys Bourgeois
- Composed: 1543
- Published: 2013

"Nun saget Dank und lobt den Herren" (Now say thanks and praise the Lord) is a Christian hymn in German, paraphrasing Psalm 118. The German text was originally written by Ambrosius Lobwasser in the 16th century as a translation, meant to match the music from the French Genevan Psalter. It was rewritten and shortened in the 20th century by Peter Enderlin to be used in a hymnal of the Swiss Reformed Church. The song is included in German hymnals of various denominations.

== History ==
The text is a paraphrase of Psalm 118 ("O give thanks unto the Lord; for he is good"). The psalm, a favourite of the reformer Martin Luther, includes elements of thanks and praise, gates opening (a motif of Advent), hope beyond death, praise of someone coming in God's name (a motif of the Benedictus), and a lasting covenant.

In the Genevan Psalter, commissioned by Calvin, all psalms were included in French-language metric paraphrase, and associated with melodies. Ambrosius Lobwasser, a professor of law from the University of Leipzig who converted to Lutheranism in 1539, together with all professors of the faculty, got to know this Psalter on study trips to France: he was so impressed that he translated the psalms into German, to accompany the same melodies as in French. His version of Psalm 118 has 14 stanzas of eight lines each.

In the 20th century, Fritz Enderlin (1883–1971), a Swiss German scholar, teacher and educational politician, was instrumental in the publication of a new hymnal for the Swiss Reformed Church, leading the hymnal commission from 1942 to 1952, the year of publication. He retained the first stanza of Lobwasser's hymn and the end of the last stanza, and rewrote the three and a half inner stanzas in 1951. He expressed the psalm's themes more succinctly, using ideas from both Lobwasser and modern Bible translations.

The German text matches the original tune from the Genevan Psalter, attributed to Guillaume Franc (1543) and Loys Bourgeois (1551), which was originally associated with Psalm 98. The melody is also used for other hymns, such as "Nun singt ein neues Lied dem Herren".

The hymn is widely used, being present in both Protestant and Catholic hymnals, as well as in various non-denominational and ecumenical collections.

== Musical settings ==
Wilfried Fischer included the hymn in his collection Singt dem Herrn ein neues Lied of three-part settings of hymns based on texts from the Old Testament through the liturgical year, published by Schott.
