= Pidoux =

Pidoux is a surname. Notable people with the surname include:

- Victor Pidoux (1807–1879), French politician
- Pierre Pidoux (1905–2001), Swiss theologian, organist and musicologist
- Edmond Pidoux (1908–2004), Swiss writer
- Xavier Pidoux de La Maduère (1910–1977), French politician
- Philippe Pidoux (b. 1943), Swiss politician
- Roland Pidoux (1946–2025), French cellist and conductor
- Raphaël Pidoux (b. 1967), French cellist
