= Was uns die Erde Gutes spendet =

Catholic Hymn for Offertory

- Offertory hymn
- Written: 1971
- Text: by Friedrich Dörr
- Language: German
- Melody: by Guillaume Franc
- Composed: 1543
- Published: 1975

"Was uns die Erde Gutes spendet" (The good that earth donates to us) is a Christian hymn, with a text mostly written in 1971 by Friedrich Dörr, to a 1543 melody by Guillaume Franc. It is part of German hymnals, including Gotteslob.

== History ==
Friedrich Dörr wrote the text in 1971 in preparation for the first common Catholic hymnal in German, Gotteslob. He set the new offertory hymn to a melody by Guillaume Franc which appeared first in Geneva in 1543 in a precursor of the Genevan Psalter. In 1975, the song was included in the Gotteslob as GL 490. It became GL 186 in the hymnal's 2013 edition among the offertory hymns. The song is part of other songbooks. It has also been used for Erntedankfest, the German Thanksgiving.
