= Guillaume Franc =

French musician and composer

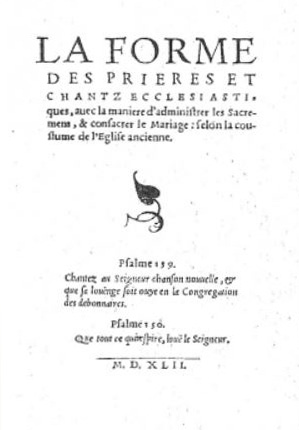
Title page of La Forme des prières et chantz ecclésiastiques (Geneva, 1542).

Guillaume Franc (c. 1505–1571) was a French musician and composer active in Geneva and Lausanne in the mid-16th century. He is regarded as instrumental in the development of both the Genevan Psalter and the Lausanne Psalter. Some of the melodies are still used in hymns in the 21st century.

== Life ==
Franc was born in Rouen around 1505, the son of Pierre, whose profession is not known. He was for some time in the service of Georges d'Armagnac, the future cardinal, as 'cantor and servant'. He married the noble Catherine de Solages, a former nun of the Abbey of Millau who had converted to the Reformation. The family, with several children, moved to Geneva, probably to find refuge there, like many French Protestants at the time.

=== Geneva ===
Franc's life in Geneva is recorded in the registers of the Council of Two Hundred. (Note: Registers transcribed by Pierre Pidoux in Pidoux 1962 vol. I pp. 5–28.) The first entry, dated 17 June 1541, is about his obtaining permission to teach music ("tenyr eschole de musique"), in the same year that the Council decided to promote congregational singing in worship. Franc began instructing children to sing the psalms. On 2 May 1542, Franc was commissioned by the Council to teach children to sing the Psalmen Davids, with an [annual] salary of 24 florins. He published La Forme des prières et chantz ecclesiastiques the same year, the first Reformed hymnal containing psalms with melodies.

In April and May 1543, several references concern the increase of his wages from 10 to 25 florins per 'quartemps' [term]. He is also deputy 'maystre des escoles pour apprendre la note', which suggests a supervisory role over the small schools of Geneva. In May 1545, the Council refused to increase his wages beyond 100 florins per year. On 3 August he requested his leave, declaring that he was not able to live on 100 florins. He moved to Lausanne.

=== Lausanne ===
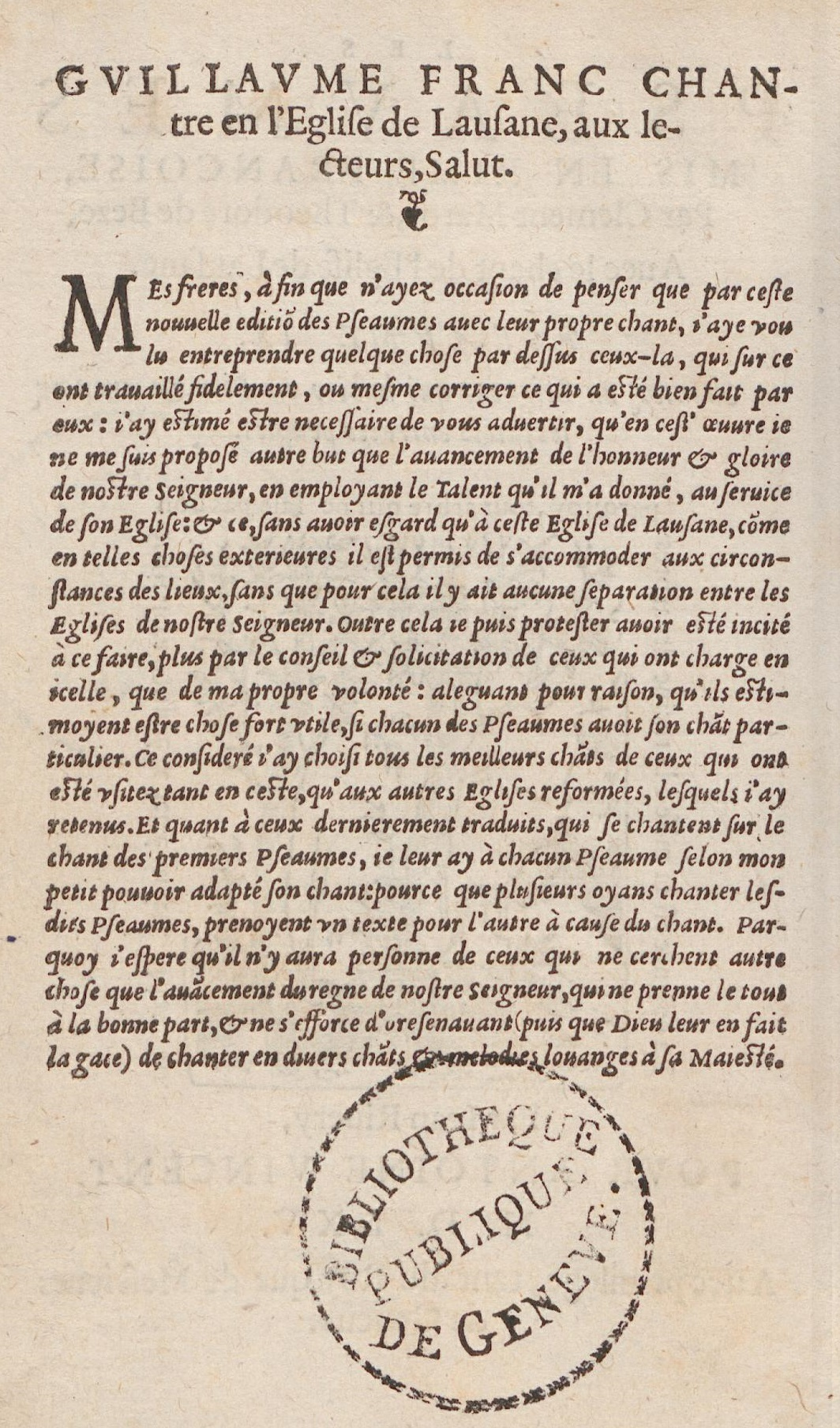
Guillaume Franc to the readers (Les Pseaumes mis en rime françoise, Lausanne, 1565)

Franc is first mentioned in the manual of the Council of Lausanne in January 1546. His salary was significantly higher than in Geneva, since he was both cantor of the Church of Lausanne, paid by the city, and a teacher at the college paid by the Bernese government, where he was responsible for the seventh grade and having to instruct the children in the singing of the psalms. He was paid in money, wheat and wine. He was first housed by the Council, then in 1552 he was given a house which remained in the family until 1847. He published his Psalms (Les Psaumes) in 1565. By the end of 1570, Franc's health was weakening, and he wrote his will on 26 January 1571, which remains the last trace of him.

== Work ==
=== 1542 melodies ===
Although there is no formal proof, it is generally accepted that Franc was responsible for the first melodies adapted to the psalms of the Church of Geneva. Between the return of John Calvin to Geneva in September 1541 and the publication by Jean Girard in 1542 of La Forme des prières et chantz ecclesiastiques (The form of church prayers and chants), Franc was the only cantor mentioned in the registers of the Geneva Council. He is supposed to have collaborated closely with Calvin.

The 1542 Forme des prières included 30 psalms, l’Oraison dominicale, the Credo by Marot, and, by Calvin, five psalms, the Cantique de Siméon and the Commandements.

=== The psalms of the Church of Lausanne ===
In 1565, three years after the publication of the official and complete Genevan Psalter, Franc published a revised edition:

Les Pseaumes mis en rime françoise, by Clément Marot, & Théodore de Bèze, avec le chant de l’Église de Lausanne. [Geneva] : Jean Rivery, 1565. 8°, [16]-470 p.

== Melodies used ==
Melodies attributed to Franc are in use in the 21st century, in hymns including:

- Herzliebster Jesu, was hast du verbrochen
- Nun saget Dank und lobt den Herren
- Nun singt ein neues Lied dem Herren
- Vor deinen Thron tret ich hiermit
- Was uns die Erde Gutes spendet
- Wenn wir in höchsten Nöten sein

== Cited sources ==
- Moritz Fürstenau (1877). "Franc, Wilhelm". Allgemeine Deutsche Biographie (in German). Vol. 7. Leipzig: Duncker & Humblot. pp. 204–205.
- Guillaume Franc, in Historical Dictionary of Switzerland.
- Arnold, Mathieu (2016). John Calvin: The Strasbourg Years (1538–1541)]. Wipf and Stock Publishers. p. 58. ISBN 978-1-4982-3962-2.
- R. Barilier. Les Psaumes de Lausanne. In Bulletin de la Société d’Histoire du Protestantisme Français 141 (1995) pp. 553–567.
- Jacques Burdet. La Musique dans le pays de Vaud sous le régime bernois, 1536–1798. Lausanne : Payot, 1963 (pp. 91–109).
- Pierre Pidoux, Le Psautier huguenot du XVIe. Basel: Bärenreiter, 1962. 2 vol.
- GLN-16: bibliographie des livres imprimés à Genève, Lausanne et Neuchâtel au XVIe. ville-ge.ch
- Gaillard, André (2001). "Franc, Guillaume". MGG.
