= Psalm 98 =

Psalm of the Book of Psalms

- "O sing unto the Lord a new song"
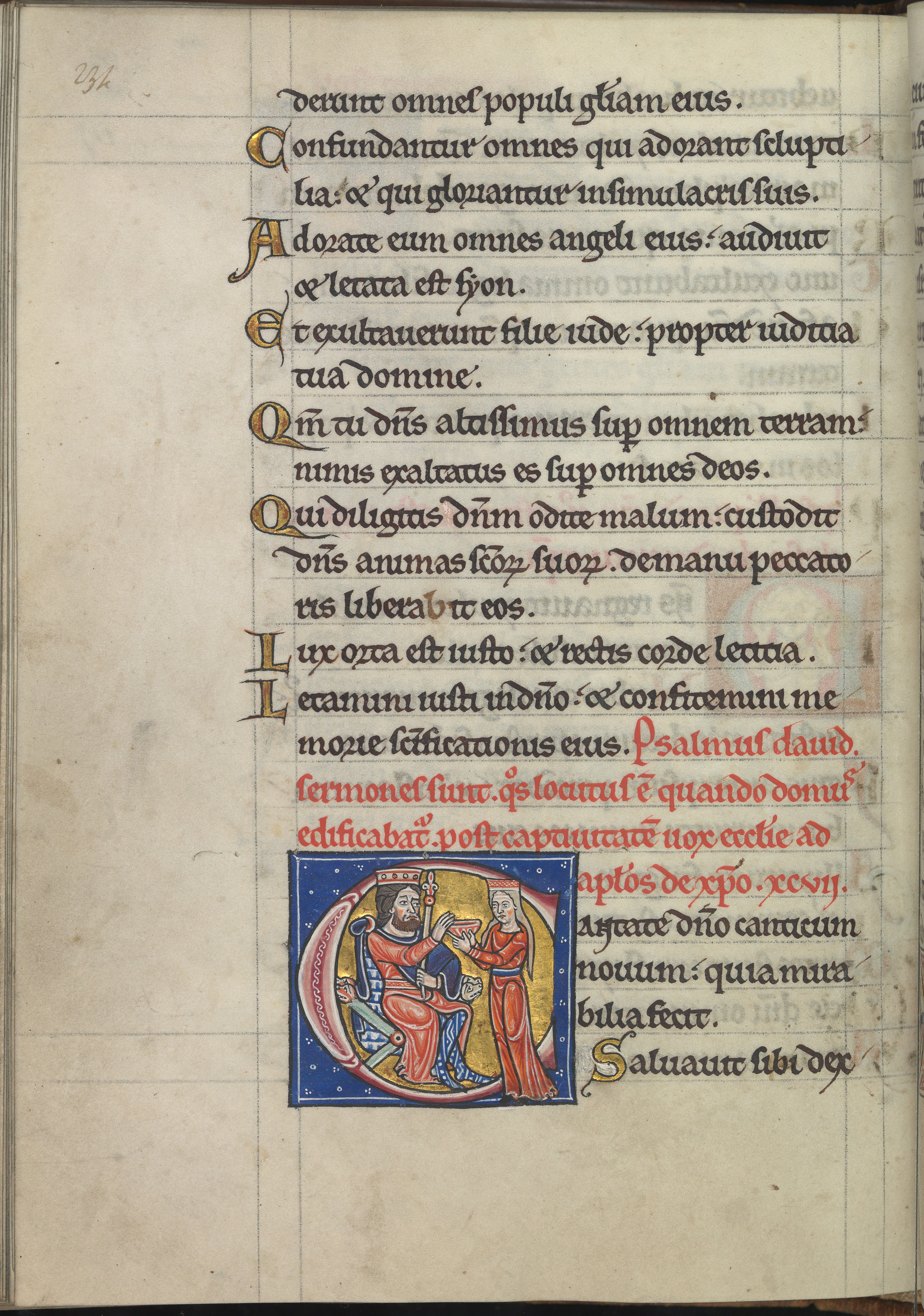
- Beginning of Cantate Domino, with an illuminated letter C in the Psalter of Eleanor of Aquitaine (c. 1185)
- Other name: Psalm 97; "Cantate Domino"; "Singet dem Herrn ein neues Lied"
- Related: Psalm 96; Psalm 149
- Language: Hebrew (original)

Psalm 98
- ← Psalm 97 Psalm 99 →
- Book: Book of Psalms
- Hebrew Bible part: Ketuvim
- Order in the Hebrew part: 1
- Category: Sifrei Emet
- Christian Bible part: Old Testament
- Order in the Christian part: 19

Psalm 98 is the 98th psalm of the Book of Psalms, beginning in English in the King James Version: "O sing unto the Lord a new song; for he hath done marvellous things". The Book of Psalms starts the third section of the Hebrew Bible, and, as such, is a book of the Christian Old Testament. In the slightly different numbering system in the Greek Septuagint version of the Bible, and in the Latin Vulgate, this psalm is Psalm 97. In Latin, it is known as "Cantate Domino". The psalm is a hymn psalm, one of the Royal Psalms, praising God as the King of His people. Like Psalms 33 and 96, it calls for the singing of "a new song".

The psalm forms a regular part of Jewish, Catholic, Lutheran, Anglican and other Protestant liturgies. It has inspired hymns such as "Joy to the World" and "Nun singt ein neues Lied dem Herren", and has often been set to music, including by Claudio Monteverdi, Marc-Antoine Charpentier, Dieterich Buxtehude and Antonín Dvořák who set it in Czech in his Biblical Songs.

== Background and themes ==
Psalm 98 describes God's redemption of Israel and the rejoicing that will ensue. It also features many expressions and instruments of music and song. According to the Midrash Tanchuma, Psalm 98 is the tenth and final song that the Jewish people will sing after the final redemption. Grammatically, the reference to a shir chadash (Hebrew: שיר חדש, a new song) in verse 1 is a masculine construction, in contrast to the shira (Hebrew: שירה, song) mentioned throughout the Tanakh, a feminine construction. Thus, the Midrash teaches that the shir chadash is a song of the future.

== Uses ==
=== New Testament ===
Verse 3 is quoted in Mary's song of praise, the Magnificat, in Luke 1:54.

=== Judaism ===
Psalm 98 is the fourth of six psalms recited during the Kabbalat Shabbat (Welcoming the Shabbat) service in Ashkenazic, Hasidic and some Sephardic communities. It is one of the additional psalms recited during the morning prayer on Shabbat in the Sephardi tradition. According to the Abudraham, this psalm corresponds to the seventh of the Ten Utterances of Creation, "Let the waters swarm" (Genesis 1:20), corresponding to verse 7 of this psalm, "Let the sea roar".

Verse 6 is one of the ten verses recited during the Mussaf Amidah on Rosh Hashana in the verses of Shofarot.

=== Book of Common Prayer ===
The psalm may be recited as a canticle in the Anglican liturgy of Evening Prayer according to the Book of Common Prayer as an alternative to the Magnificat, when it is referred to by its incipit as Cantate Domino. It is not included as a canticle in Common Worship, but it does of course appear in the psalter.

=== Coptic Orthodox Church ===
In the Agpeya, the Coptic Church's book of hours, this psalm is prayed in the office of None.

== Musical settings ==
=== Hymns ===
Loys Bourgeois set the psalm in the Genevan Psalter, with a melody used later also for the German hymn "Nun singt ein neues Lied dem Herren" (1967) by Georg Thurmair, a paraphrase of the psalm. "Joy to the World", one of the most popular English Christmas carols, is a lyrical adaptation of Psalm 98 written in 1719 by Isaac Watts and set by Lowell Mason to a tune attributed to George Frideric Handel. The 1941 hymn "Singt dem Herrn ein neues Lied" was also inspired by the psalm.

=== Motets ===
Heinrich Schütz set a German metred version of Psalm 98 in the Becker Psalter, published in 1628, Singet dem Herrn ein neues Lied, SWV 196. Marc-Antoine Charpentier composed in 1679-80 one Cantate Domino, H.176, for three voices, two treble instruments, and continuo. Michel-Richard de Lalande composed one grand motet (S.72) in 1720, as also Étienne Moulinier, Dieterich Buxtehude, Nicolas Bernier, Charles-Hubert Gervais CHG.36, Henry Madin HM.12, Louis Grénon, Jean-Joseph de Mondonville and Claudio Monteverdi.

Georg Philipp Telemann's Singet dem Herrn ein neues Lied, TWV 1:1345 is a setting of Psalm 98.

Czech composer Antonín Dvořák set part of Psalm 98 (together with part of Psalm 96) to music as No. 10 of his Biblical Songs in 1894. John Rutter set the psalm as the first movement of his choral work The Falcon. A setting was also written by Arvo Pärt in Latin.

Bernard Barrell composed Show Yourselves Joyful unto the Lord, an anthem for female chorus and organ, Op. 130 (1993).

Andrew Lloyd Webber set the psalm as a coronation anthem for the Coronation of Charles III in 2023.

== Text ==
The following table shows the Hebrew text of the Psalm with vowels, alongside the Koine Greek text in the Septuagint and the English translation from the King James Version. Note that the meaning can slightly differ between these versions, as the Septuagint and the Masoretic Text come from different textual traditions. (Note: A 1917 translation directly from Hebrew to English by the Jewish Publication Society can be found here or here, and an 1844 translation directly from the Septuagint by L. C. L. Brenton can be found here. Both translations are in the public domain.) In the Septuagint, this psalm is numbered Psalm 97.

#	Hebrew	English	Greek
1	מִזְמ֡וֹר שִׁ֤ירוּ לַיהֹוָ֨ה ׀ שִׁ֣יר חָ֭דָשׁ כִּֽי־נִפְלָא֣וֹת עָשָׂ֑ה הוֹשִׁיעָה־לּ֥וֹ יְ֝מִינ֗וֹ וּזְר֥וֹעַ קׇדְשֽׁוֹ׃	(A Psalm.) O sing unto the LORD a new song; for he hath done marvellous things: his right hand, and his holy arm, hath gotten him the victory.	Ψαλμὸς τῷ Δαυΐδ. - ΑΣΑΤΕ τῷ Κυρίῳ ᾆσμα καινόν, ὅτι θαυμαστὰ ἐποίησεν ὁ Κύριος· ἔσωσεν αὐτὸν ἡ δεξιὰ αὐτοῦ καὶ ὁ βραχίων ὁ ἅγιος αὐτοῦ.
2	הוֹדִ֣יעַ יְ֭הֹוָה יְשׁוּעָת֑וֹ לְעֵינֵ֥י הַ֝גּוֹיִ֗ם גִּלָּ֥ה צִדְקָתֽוֹ׃	The LORD hath made known his salvation: his righteousness hath he openly shewed in the sight of the heathen.	ἐγνώρισε Κύριος τὸ σωτήριον αὐτοῦ, ἐναντίον τῶν ἐθνῶν ἀπεκάλυψε τὴν δικαιοσύνην αὐτοῦ.
3	זָ֘כַ֤ר חַסְדּ֨וֹ ׀ וֶ֥אֱֽמוּנָתוֹ֮ לְבֵ֢ית יִשְׂרָ֫אֵ֥ל רָא֥וּ כׇל־אַפְסֵי־אָ֑רֶץ אֵ֝֗ת יְשׁוּעַ֥ת אֱלֹהֵֽינוּ׃	He hath remembered his mercy and his truth toward the house of Israel: all the ends of the earth have seen the salvation of our God.	ἐμνήσθη τοῦ ἐλέους αὐτοῦ τῷ ᾿Ιακὼβ καὶ τῆς ἀληθείας αὐτοῦ τῷ οἴκῳ ᾿Ισραήλ· εἴδοσαν πάντα τὰ πέρατα τῆς γῆς τὸ σωτήριον τοῦ Θεοῦ ἡμῶν.
4	הָרִ֣יעוּ לַ֭יהֹוָה כׇּל־הָאָ֑רֶץ פִּצְח֖וּ וְרַנְּנ֣וּ וְזַמֵּֽרוּ׃	Make a joyful noise unto the LORD, all the earth: make a loud noise, and rejoice, and sing praise.	ἀλαλάξατε τῷ Θεῷ, πᾶσα ἡ γῆ, ᾄσατε καὶ ἀγαλλιᾶσθε καὶ ψάλατε·
5	זַמְּר֣וּ לַיהֹוָ֣ה בְּכִנּ֑וֹר בְּ֝כִנּ֗וֹר וְק֣וֹל זִמְרָֽה׃	Sing unto the LORD with the harp; with the harp, and the voice of a psalm	ψάλατε τῷ Κυρίῳ ἐν κιθάρᾳ, ἐν κιθάρᾳ καὶ φωνῇ ψαλμοῦ·
6	בַּ֭חֲצֹ֣צְרוֹת וְק֣וֹל שׁוֹפָ֑ר הָ֝רִ֗יעוּ לִפְנֵ֤י ׀ הַמֶּ֬לֶךְ יְהֹוָֽה׃	With trumpets and sound of cornet make a joyful noise before the LORD, the King.	ἐν σάλπιγξιν ἐλαταῖς καὶ φωνῇ σάλπιγγος κερατίνης ἀλαλάξατε ἐνώπιον τοῦ Βασιλέως Κυρίου.
7	יִרְעַ֣ם הַ֭יָּם וּמְלֹא֑וֹ תֵּ֝בֵ֗ל וְיֹ֣שְׁבֵי בָֽהּ׃	Let the sea roar, and the fulness thereof; the world, and they that dwell therein.	σαλευθήτω ἡ θάλασσα καὶ τὸ πλήρωμα αὐτῆς, ἡ οἰκουμένη καὶ πάντες οἱ κατοικοῦντες ἐν αὐτῇ.
8	נְהָר֥וֹת יִמְחֲאוּ־כָ֑ף יַ֝֗חַד הָרִ֥ים יְרַנֵּֽנוּ׃	Let the floods clap their hands: let the hills be joyful together	ποταμοὶ κροτήσουσι χειρὶ ἐπὶ τὸ αὐτό, τὰ ὄρη ἀγαλλιάσονται,
9	לִ֥פְֽנֵי יְהֹוָ֗ה כִּ֥י בָא֮ לִשְׁפֹּ֢ט הָ֫אָ֥רֶץ יִשְׁפֹּֽט־תֵּבֵ֥ל בְּצֶ֑דֶק וְ֝עַמִּ֗ים בְּמֵישָׁרִֽים׃	Before the LORD; for he cometh to judge the earth: with righteousness shall he judge the world, and the people with equity.	ὅτι ἥκει κρῖναι τὴν γῆν· κρινεῖ τὴν οἰκουμένην ἐν δικαιοσύνῃ καὶ λαοὺς ἐν εὐθύτητι.
