= Nun singt ein neues Lied dem Herren =

Christian hymn with German text

- Christian hymn
- Written: 1967
- Text: by Georg Thurmair
- Language: German
- Based on: Psalm 98
- Melody: from Genevan Psalter
- Composed: 1543
- Published: 1975

"Nun singt ein neues Lied dem Herren" (Now sing a new song to the Lord) is a Christian hymn with German text by Georg Thurmair. He based it on Psalm 98 and wrote it in 1967 to match a traditional 16th-century melody. The song is part of German hymnals, including Gotteslob, and songbooks.

== History ==
The Reformation introduced the German language in the church liturgy, and specifically metered hymns paraphrasing the psalms, called Psalmlieder (psalm songs). The reformer Martin Luther wrote several hymns including Psalmlieder such as "Ein feste Burg" after Psalm 42 and "Aus der Tiefen" after Psalm 130. In the 20th century, the Catholic theologian and hymnodist Georg Thurmair worked in this tradition. He wrote "Nun singt ein neues Lied dem Herren" in 1967, based on Psalm 98, to a melody from the Genevan Psalter attributed to Guillaume Franc (1543) and Loys Bourgeois (1551). Thurmair revised the text in 1972.

The song was included in the German Catholic hymnal Gotteslob of 1975 as GL 262. It was retained in the 2013 edition as GL 551, in the section "Leben in der Kirche - Die himmlische Stadt" (Life in the Church – The Heavenly City). The song is included in several songbooks.

== Text ==
Thurmair's song is in three stanzas of eight lines each, following the psalm closely. Each stanza can be understood without the context of the others.

== Melody and musical setting ==
In the Genevan Psalter, the melody attributed to Guillaume Franc (1543) and Loys Bourgeois (1551) was associated with Psalm 98. Johann Paul Zehetbauer composed a four-part setting for his collection Lieder und Chorsätze zum Kirchenjahr (Songs and choral settings for the liturgical year), published by Christophorus-Verlag in Freiburg. Max Eham composed a four-part setting with optional organ, published by Carus-Verlag.
