= Mein ganzes Herz erhebet dich =

German Christian hymn

"Mein ganzes Herz erhebet dich" (My whole heart magnifies You) is the beginning of German hymns to a melody from the 16th century, which paraphrase Psalm 138. They are part of Protestant and Catholic hymnals.

== History ==
A rhymed version in French of Psalm 138 appeared in the Genevan Psalter. This psalter was used by the Huguenots, who were persecuted in France for more than two centuries but nonetheless sang psalms and derived strength from doing so.

The melody appeared first in Paris in 1530. Like other melodies of the Psalter, it was simple, spanning only an octave, and in easy rhythm of notes in only two values. The Reformed pastor Matthias Jorisson wrote new texts in German to the Genevan melodies, published first as Neue Bereimung der Psalmen in 1798, paying closer attention to the biblical originals than the Genevan Psalter, expanded in 1806 to Die Psalmen Davids neu übersetzt und in Reime gebracht. He wrote Psalm 138 in four stanzas, which became part of the Protestant hymnal Evangelisches Kirchengesangbuch as EKG 470.

A hymn with the same incipit and the same melody, but with an otherwise changed text in three stanzas, appeared in Zürich in 1941. In the 1970s, the French pastor Roger Chapal revised this version, as all other psalms. It was included in the Catholic hymnal Gotteslob of 1975, as GL 264. This hymn appears in the Gotteslob of 2013 as GL 143, in the section "Gesänge zur Eröffnung", suitable for the opening of a service. The hymn has often been set to music. In the Protestant hymnal Evangelisches Gesangbuch, it appears in regional sections, such as EG 620 in Baden and EG 634 in the Lippe region.
