= Ali Ufkî =

Polish musician and translator (1610–1675)

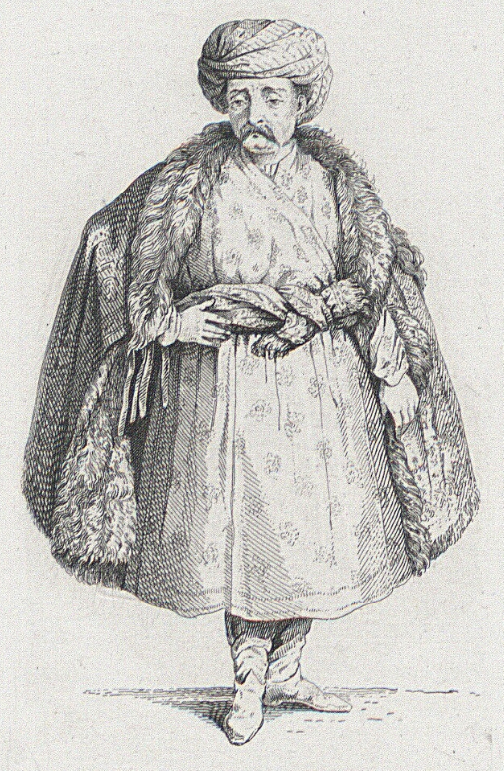
- Born: Wojciech Bobowski; 1610; Bobowa, Poland
- Died: 1675 (aged 64–65)

Wojciech Bobowski or Ali Ufki (also Albertus Bobovius, Ali Bey, Santurî Ali Ufki; 1610–1675) was a Polish, later Ottoman musician and dragoman in the Ottoman Empire. He translated the Bible into Ottoman Turkish, composed an Ottoman Psalter, based on the Genevan metrical psalter, and wrote a grammar of the Ottoman Turkish language. His musicological works are considered among the most important in 17th-century Ottoman music.

== Life ==
Bobowski was born as a Pole in Bobowa near Gorlice. He was raised in a Protestant family and started a career as a church musician. At some point, he was captured by a Turkish prince as his sister was married to an Ottoman sultan.

Because he had enjoyed musical training and was capable of reading and notating music, he was sold to the court of sultan Murad IV (and later Ibrahim I and Mehmed IV), where he converted to Islam and became known as Alī Ufqī. At the court he served as an interpreter, treasurer and musician in the sultan's seraglio. He was also known to have mastered 17 languages, including Polish, Turkish, Arabic, Spanish, French, German, Greek, Hebrew, Italian, and Latin.

Around 1657, approximately 19–20 years after he was captured when on a voyage to Egypt, he regained his liberty, after which he lived in Egypt for some time. It is also likely he travelled on a pilgrimage to Mecca. After he gained his freedom he became one of the most important dragomans in the Ottoman Empire.

== Works ==
=== Bible translation ===
Bobowski, or now Ufki, having been raised as a Christian and now being a convert to Islam, became deeply interested in religious issues. He translated the Anglican catechism into Ottoman Turkish, and wrote an explanation of Islam in Latin, in an attempt to increase the mutual understanding of both cultures.

Bobowski's translation of the Bible into Turkish, known as the Kitabı Mukaddes ("Holy Book") has for long been the only complete Turkish Bible and is considered one of his greatest achievements.

=== Psalter ===
Having been raised in a Protestant family, Bobowski was familiar with the singing of the Genevan Psalms. This experience greatly influenced his composition of fourteen Turkish psalms.

In this small collection of psalms, known as Mezmurlar and released in 1665, Ali Ufki used original melodies from the Genevan Psalter, a commonly used Calvinist hymnbook. He classified them using the Turkish modal system and translated the texts into Ottoman Turkish. Because of certain features of French prosody, the Genevan melodies tend to be in asymmetrical meters, which makes them more similar to Middle Eastern music than much of other European music. Rhythmical intensity is likely one of the most important shared features, and their modal character facilitates their transformation into Turkish modes, as this can be done with only light changes in intonation. Ali Ufki's versions of the psalms are relatively simple; with careful attention paid to ensuring words are easy to understand and music is only the background.

In 2005, the King's Singers together with Sarband released a CD titled Sacred Bridges which includes recordings of Psalms 5, 6, and 9 from Ali Ufki's psalter.

=== Musical anthologies ===
Among his achievements was the release of two manuscript anthologies of Ottoman music, known as Mecmûa-i Sâz ü Söz ("Collection of Instrumental and Vocal Works"). These anthologies contained both sacred and secular pieces, instrumental and vocal music, art music as well as traditional Turkish folk music. Only two manuscript copies survive: in the British Library and the Bibliothèque nationale de France . This work preserved for modern times several hundred classical Ottoman songs and instrumental pieces and is the first instance in which western staff notation was applied to Turkish music.

=== Other works ===
In 1666, Bobowski also wrote a grammar of the Ottoman Turkish language. He also translated works of Hugo Grotius and Comenius into that language.

== Notes ==
- Some sources indicate 1616.
- Some sources note his place of birth as Bobowa village in Lesser Poland, although Lwów is the most common place given.
- Sources vary greatly on this one, with his age at capture being given as 13, 14, 18 and 30. Considering he had some knowledge of music, and that some of his work is mentioned in the context of 1630 it would appear that the age of around 18 is most likely, and 30 is the least likely if he indeed served on the courts of two sultans previous to Mehmed IV. The Polish Biographical Dictionary notes that he received his freedom in 1657, about 19 years after his capture. This would indicate he was captured in 1638, thus he would have been either 28 (if born in 1610) or 22 (if born in 1616).
