= Psalm 138 =

138th psalm of the book of psalms

- "I will praise thee with my whole heart"
- Hymn psalm
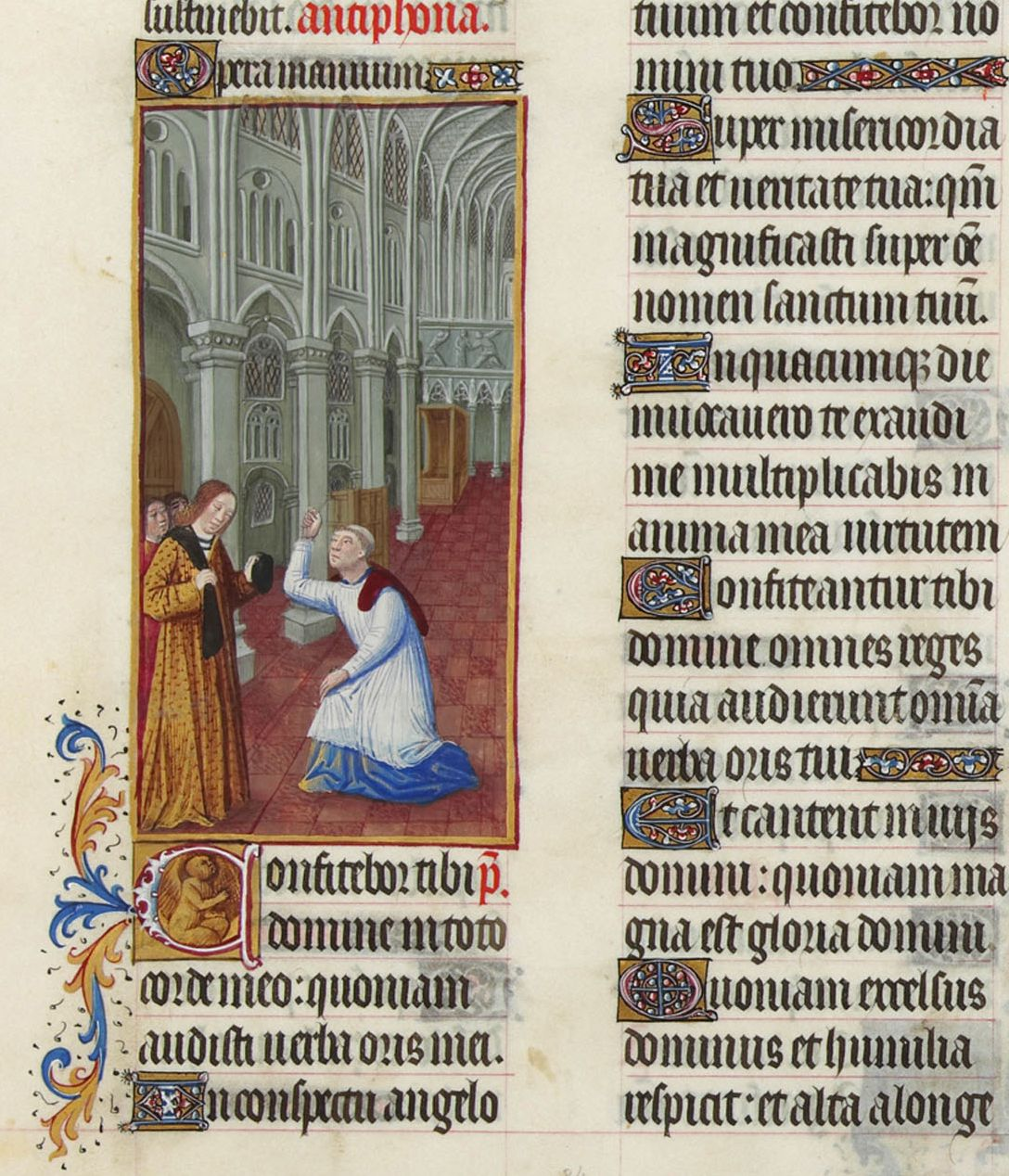
- The beginning of Psalm 138, Hymne d'action de grâce, folio 84 of Les Très Riches Heures du duc de Berry, musée Condé, ms.65. The miniature represents a religious spraying holy water on a dignitary who had just entered his church.
- Other name: Psalm 137 (Vulgate); "Confitebor tibi Domine in toto corde meo"
- Language: Hebrew (original)

Psalm 138
- ← Psalm 137 Psalm 139 →
- Book: Book of Psalms
- Hebrew Bible part: Ketuvim
- Order in the Hebrew part: 1
- Category: Sifrei Emet
- Christian Bible part: Old Testament
- Order in the Christian part: 19

Psalm 138 is the 138th psalm of the Book of Psalms, beginning in English in the King James Version: "I will praise thee with my whole heart". In Latin, it is known as "Confitebor tibi Domine in toto corde meo". In order to distinguish it from the two others Confitebor psalms, it is sometimes referred to as "Confitebor angelorum". The psalm is a hymn psalm.

In the slightly different numbering system used in the Greek Septuagint version of the Bible and in the Latin Vulgate, this psalm is Psalm 137.

The psalm is sometimes used in Catholic liturgy. It has been set to music by composers including Jan Dismas Zelenka and Michel Richard Delalande].

== History and content ==
Psalm 138 is the 138th psalm from the Book of Psalms, which is the first book of the Ketuvim ("Writings") in the Hebrew Bible, and is also a book of the Christian Old Testament. It is part of the final Davidic collection of psalms, comprising Psalms 138 through 145, which are specifically attributed to David in their opening verses. However, Dunn and Rogerson assert that the psalm was written as an expression of thankfulness after the return from exile in Babylon. This particular psalm describes that those who are close to God live in reality, and those who believe in human power live in a world of fantasy.

The singer begins with individual thanks for God's lasting love and care. The hope that it will endure forever ends the psalm, framing the middle section which first calls to universal thanks and praise, and then mentions ongoing adversaries and trouble which the singer is sure to overcome with God's help.

== Uses ==
=== Judaism ===
Psalm 138 is traditionally recited as a psalm of thanks and gratitude to God.

Verse 2 is recited during Selichot.

Verse 4 is the verse said by the mule in Perek Shirah.

Verses 3 and 8 are recited at the end of the Amidah by people whose names begin with the first letter of the verse and end with the last letter of the verse.

=== Catholic Church ===
Historically, this psalm was recited or sung at the office of Vespers on Wednesdays, according to the Rule of St. Benedict. In the Liturgy of the Hours, Psalm 138 is recited at Vespers on the Tuesday of the fourth week of the four weekly liturgical cycle. In the liturgy of the Mass, it is played on the 21st Sunday of Ordinary Time of the year, the 5th and the 17th Sunday in Ordinary Time of the year.

=== Coptic Orthodox Church ===
In the Agpeya, the Coptic Church's book of hours, this psalm is prayed in the office of Compline and the third watch of the Midnight office.

== Musical settings ==
The psalm appeared in a rhymed version in the hymnal Genevan Psalter in the 1551 edition. German versions on the same melody, "Mein ganzes Herz erhebet dich", were published from the 18th century, and are part of Protestant and Catholic hymnals.

Michel Richard Delalande set the psalm in Latin, "Confitebor tibi Domine in toto corde meo", S.48, for soloists, chorus and orchestra in 1697.. Jan Dismas Zelenka wrote one setting for soloists, chorus and orchestra, ZWV 100.

== Text ==
The following table shows the Hebrew text of the Psalm with vowels, alongside the Koine Greek text in the Septuagint and the English translation from the King James Version. Note that the meaning can slightly differ between these versions, as the Septuagint and the Masoretic Text come from different textual traditions. (Note: A 1917 translation directly from Hebrew to English by the Jewish Publication Society can be found here or here, and an 1844 translation directly from the Septuagint by L. C. L. Brenton can be found here. Both translations are in the public domain.) In the Septuagint, this psalm is numbered Psalm 137.

#	Hebrew	English	Greek
1	לְדָוִ֨ד ׀ אוֹדְךָ֥ בְכׇל־לִבִּ֑י נֶ֖גֶד אֱלֹהִ֣ים אֲזַמְּרֶֽךָּ׃	(A Psalm of David.) I will praise thee with my whole heart: before the gods will I sing praise unto thee.	Ψαλμὸς τῷ Δαυΐδ, ᾿Αγγαίου καὶ Ζαχαρίου. - ΕΞΟΜΟΛΟΓΗΣΟΜΑΙ σοι, Κύριε, ἐν ὅλῃ καρδίᾳ μου, καὶ ἐναντίον ἀγγέλων ψαλῶ σοι, ὅτι ἤκουσας πάντα τὰ ῥήματα τοῦ στόματός μου.
2	אֶשְׁתַּחֲוֶ֨ה אֶל־הֵיכַ֪ל קׇדְשְׁךָ֡ וְא֘וֹדֶ֤ה אֶת־שְׁמֶ֗ךָ עַל־חַסְדְּךָ֥ וְעַל־אֲמִתֶּ֑ךָ כִּֽי־הִגְדַּ֥לְתָּ עַל־כׇּל־שִׁ֝מְךָ֗ אִמְרָתֶֽךָ׃	I will worship toward thy holy temple, and praise thy name for thy lovingkindness and for thy truth: for thou hast magnified thy word above all thy name.	προσκυνήσω πρὸς ναὸν ἅγιόν σου καὶ ἐξομολογήσομαι τῷ ὀνόματί σου ἐπὶ τῷ ἐλέει σου καὶ τῇ ἀληθείᾳ σου, ὅτι ἐμεγάλυνας ἐπὶ πᾶν τὸ ὄνομα τὸ ἅγιόν σου.
3	בְּי֣וֹם קָ֭רָֽאתִי וַֽתַּעֲנֵ֑נִי תַּרְהִבֵ֖נִי בְנַפְשִׁ֣י עֹֽז׃	In the day when I cried thou answeredst me, and strengthenedst me with strength in my soul.	ἐν ᾗ ἂν ἡμέρᾳ ἐπικαλέσωμαί σε, ταχὺ ἐπάκουσόν μου· πολυωρήσεις με ἐν ψυχῇ μου δυνάμει σου.
4	יוֹד֣וּךָ יְ֭הֹוָה כׇּל־מַלְכֵי־אָ֑רֶץ כִּ֥י שָׁ֝מְע֗וּ אִמְרֵי־פִֽיךָ׃	All the kings of the earth shall praise thee, O LORD, when they hear the words of thy mouth.	ἐξομολογησάσθωσάν σοι, Κύριε, πάντες οἱ βασιλεῖς τῆς γῆς, ὅτι ἤκουσαν πάντα τὰ ῥήματα τοῦ στόματός σου.
5	וְ֭יָשִׁירוּ בְּדַרְכֵ֣י יְהֹוָ֑ה כִּֽי־גָ֝ד֗וֹל כְּב֣וֹד יְהֹוָֽה׃	Yea, they shall sing in the ways of the LORD: for great is the glory of the LORD.	καὶ ᾀσάτωσαν ἐν ταῖς ᾠδαῖς Κυρίου, ὅτι μεγάλη ἡ δόξα Κυρίου,
6	כִּי־רָ֣ם יְ֭הֹוָה וְשָׁפָ֣ל יִרְאֶ֑ה וְ֝גָבֹ֗הַּ מִמֶּרְחָ֥ק יְיֵדָֽע׃	Though the LORD be high, yet hath he respect unto the lowly: but the proud he knoweth afar off.	ὅτι ὑψηλὸς Κύριος καὶ τὰ ταπεινὰ ἐφορᾷ καὶ τὰ ὑψηλὰ ἀπὸ μακρόθεν γινώσκει.
7	אִם־אֵלֵ֤ךְ ׀ בְּקֶ֥רֶב צָרָ֗ה תְּחַ֫יֵּ֥נִי עַ֤ל אַ֣ף אֹ֭יְבַי תִּשְׁלַ֣ח יָדֶ֑ךָ וְת֖וֹשִׁיעֵ֣נִי יְמִינֶֽךָ׃	Though I walk in the midst of trouble, thou wilt revive me: thou shalt stretch forth thine hand against the wrath of mine enemies, and thy right hand shall save me.	ἐὰν πορευθῶ ἐν μέσῳ θλίψεως, ζήσεις με· ἐπ᾿ ὀργὴν ἐχθρῶν μου ἐξέτεινας χεῖράς σου, καὶ ἔσωσέ με ἡ δεξιά σου.
8	יְהֹוָה֮ יִגְמֹ֢ר בַּ֫עֲדִ֥י יְ֭הֹוָה חַסְדְּךָ֣ לְעוֹלָ֑ם מַעֲשֵׂ֖י יָדֶ֣יךָ אַל־תֶּֽרֶף׃	The LORD will perfect that which concerneth me: thy mercy, O LORD, endureth for ever: forsake not the works of thine own hands.	Κύριος ἀνταποδώσει ὑπὲρ ἐμοῦ. Κύριε, τὸ ἔλεός σου εἰς τὸν αἰῶνα, τὰ ἔργα τῶν χειρῶν σου μὴ παρίδῃς.

=== Verse 1 ===
I will praise You with my whole heart;
Before the gods I will sing praises to You.

Alexander Kirkpatrick notes that the object of the psalmist's praise is not named, nor is it necessary that the LORD should be named, although in certain "ancient versions", "the Lord" is added. Among modern translations, the New Revised Standard Version and the Modern English Version add "O Lord".

== Cited sources ==
- Dunn, James D. G.; Rogerson, John William (2003). Eerdmans Commentary on the Bible. Wm. B. Eerdmans Publishing. pp. 430–431. ISBN 978-0-80-283711-0.
- Pankhurst, Jennifer (2018). "The Conventions of Biblical Poetry". myjewishlearning.com.
