= Joy to the World =

1719 English Christian hymn

- Genre: Christmas carol
- Written: 1719
- Text: Isaac Watts
- Based on: Psalm 98
- Meter: 8.6.8.6 Common metre (C.M.)
- Melody: "Antioch" by George Frideric Handel, arranged by Lowell Mason

"Joy to the World" is an English hymn and Christmas carol. Written in 1719 by the English minister and hymnist Isaac Watts, the hymn is usually sung to an 1848 arrangement by the American composer Lowell Mason of a tune attributed to George Frideric Handel. The hymn's lyrics are a Christian interpretation of Psalm 98 and Genesis 3.

Since the 20th century, "Joy to the World" has been the most-published Christmas carol in North America. As of December 2009, it was published in 1,387 hymnals in North America, according to the Dictionary of North American Hymnology.

== Lyrics ==
"Joy to the World" has four stanzas, although the third stanza is occasionally omitted.

Joy to the world; the Lord is come!
Let Earth receive her King;
Let every heart prepare Him room,
𝄆 And heaven and nature sing, 𝄇
And heaven, and heaven, and nature sing.

Joy to the Earth, (Note: Some editions have "world" here instead of "Earth", which the original text from 1719 uses.) the Saviour reigns;
Let men their songs employ;
While fields and floods, rocks, hills, and plains
𝄆 Repeat the sounding joy, 𝄇
Repeat, repeat the sounding joy.

No more let sins and sorrows grow,
Nor thorns infest the ground;
He comes to make His blessings flow
𝄆 Far as the curse is found, 𝄇
Far as, far as, the curse is found.

He rules the world with truth and grace,
And makes the nations prove
The glories of His righteousness,
𝄆 And wonders of His love, 𝄇
And wonders, wonders, of His love.

== History ==
=== Origin ===
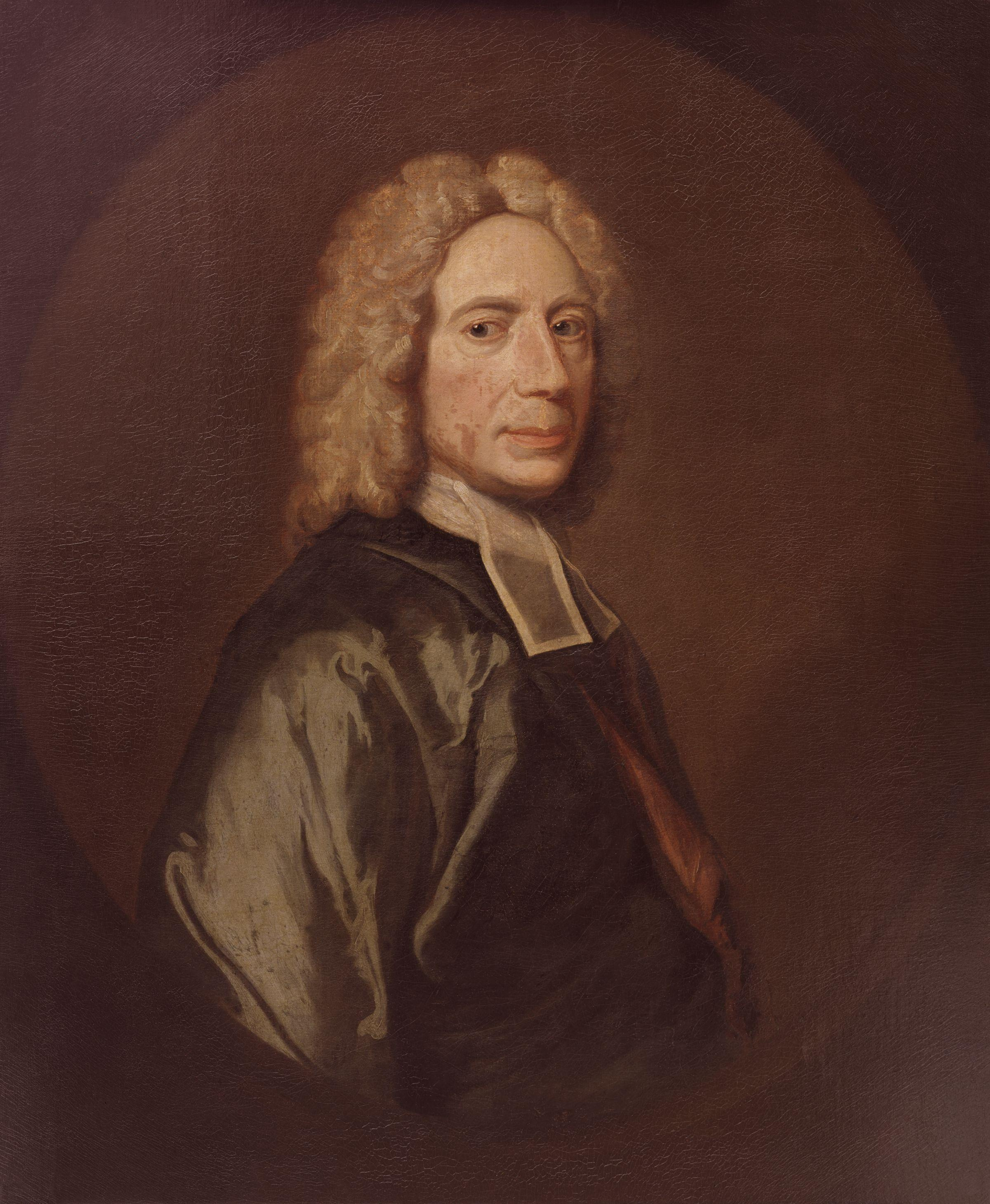
Isaac Watts, the author of the lyrics to "Joy to the World"

"Joy to the World" was written by the English minister and hymnist Isaac Watts, based on a Christian interpretation of Psalm 98 and Genesis 3. The song was first published in 1719 under the title "The Messiah's Coming and Kingdom" in Watts's collection The Psalms of David: Imitated in the Language of the New Testament, and applied to the Christian State and Worship. In it, he asserts that Psalms 96-98 refer to "Christ's Incarnation, his setting up his Gospel-Kingdom to judge or rule the Gentiles, and the Judgment and Destruction of the Heathen Idols". The paraphrase is Watts's Christological interpretation of Psalm 98. In first and second stanzas, Watts writes of heaven and earth rejoicing at the coming of the King. Stanza three, an interlude that alludes to Genesis 3:17–19 rather than to the psalm text, speaks of Christ's blessings extending victoriously over the realm of sin. The cheerful repetition of the phrase "far as the curse is found" has caused this stanza to be omitted from some hymnals. But the line makes joyful sense when understood from the New Testament eyes through which Watts interprets the psalm. Stanza four celebrates Christ's rule over the nations. The nations are called to celebrate because God's faithfulness to the House of Israel had brought salvation to the world.

=== Music ===
Mason's "Antioch"
On piano

"Joy to the World"
United States Army Chorus

Watts's 1719 preface says the verses "are fitted to the Tunes of the Old Psalm-Book" and includes the instruction, "To the Common Tunes sing all entitled Common Metre." It is not clear whether "Old Psalm-Book" means Playford's 1677 publication or some other. Sternhold and Hopkins's "old version" and Tate and Brady's "new version", among others, circulated at that time as well. In the late 18th century, "Joy to the World" was printed with music several times, but the tunes were unrelated to the one commonly used today.

The tune usually used today is from an 1848 edition by Lowell Mason for The National Psalmist (Boston, 1848). Mason was by that time an accomplished and well-known composer and arranger, having composed tunes such as "Bethany" and "Hamburg", which were used for the hymns "Nearer, My God, to Thee" and "When I Survey the Wondrous Cross". Mason's 1848 publication of the current tune was the fourth version to have been published. The first, published in his 1836 book Occasional Psalm and Hymn Tunes, featured the present day tune (in a different arrangement) with the present-day lyrics, the first such publication to do so. The name of this tune was given as "Antioch", and was attributed as being "From Handel". A very similar arrangement of the tune to today's arrangement, and also with the present-day lyrics, was published in Mason's 1839 book The Modern Psalmist. It was also titled "Antioch" and attributed to Handel.

Musically, the first four notes of "Joy to the World" are the same as the first four in the chorus "Lift up your heads" from Handel's Messiah (premiered 1742), and, in the third line, the same as found in another Messiah piece: the arioso, "Comfort ye". Consequently, and with Mason's attribution to Handel, there has long been speculation over how much a part Handel's Messiah had in "Joy to the World". The limited resemblances between Messiah and "Joy to the World", have been dismissed as 'chance resemblance' by Handel scholars today. However, the possibility of a common source antedating Antioch, Handel, and Mason alike may suggest that resemblances are more than coincidental. Handel was a native German and Lutheran from Halle in Brandenburg-Prussia before he moved to England in 1712 aged 27, and most likely was familiar with his denomination's hymnic repertoire. In addition, it is known Mason was a great admirer and scholar of Handel's music, and had in fact become president of the Boston Handel and Haydn Society in 1827 and was also an editor for them. The possibility of a common source is described in the next paragraph.

Several tunes have been found from the early 1830s closely resembling that of "Antioch", the earliest of which was published in 1832 under the title "Comfort" (possibly as a nod to Handel's "Comfort ye"). This would make it at least four years older than Mason's first publication of "Antioch". Other publications from the early 1830s further suggest the tune may have been around for some time before Mason published his arrangement. Thomas Hawkes published the "Comfort" tune in 1833 in his Collection of Tunes. In it, the attribution was given simply as "Author Unknown", suggesting it may have been older. A 1986 article by John Wilson also showed "Antioch"'s close resemblance to an 1833 publication of "Comfort" and its associated Wesley hymn "O Joyful Sound". In any case, there is no evidence to suggest that the tune is older than Martin Luther's "Vom Himmel hoch da komm ich her", a Christmas chorale of which Antioch appears to be an expanded paraphrase. This resemblance suggests Vom Himmel hoch as a common source and also may explain the widespread use of "Joy to the World" as a Christmas hymn.

A version by the Trinity Choir was very popular in 1911. As of December 2009, "Joy to the World" was the most-published Christmas hymn in North America.

== See also ==
- List of Christmas carols
