= Psalm 118 =

Psalm of the Book of Psalms in the Bible

- "O give thanks unto the LORD; for he is good"
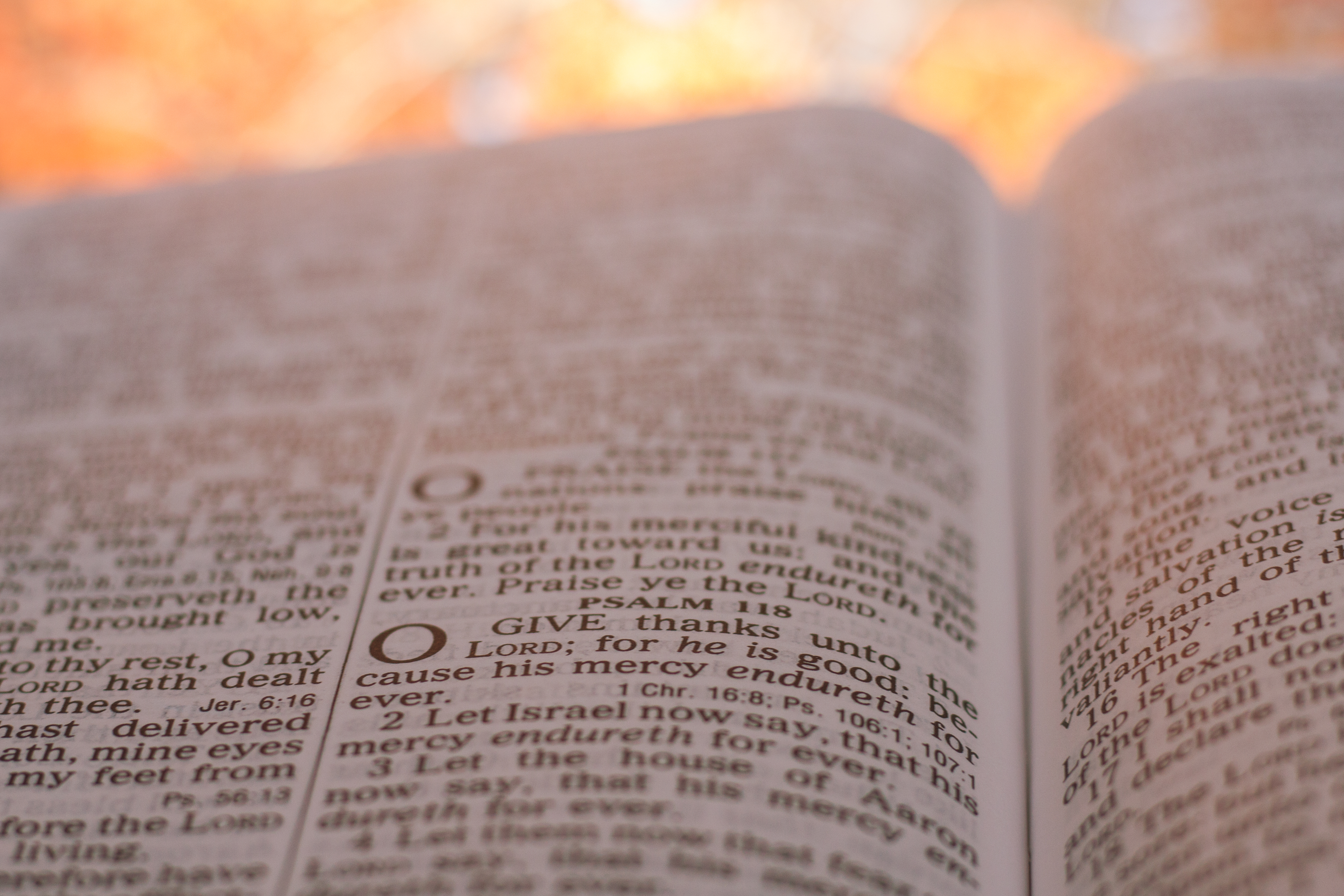
- A Bible open to Psalm 118
- Other name: Psalm 117 (Vulgate); "Confitemini Domino"
- Language: Hebrew (original)

Psalm 118
- ← Psalm 117 Psalm 119 →
- Book: Book of Psalms
- Hebrew Bible part: Ketuvim
- Order in the Hebrew part: 1
- Category: Sifrei Emet
- Christian Bible part: Old Testament
- Order in the Christian part: 19

Psalm 118 is the 118th psalm of the Book of Psalms, beginning in the English of the King James Version: "O give thanks unto the LORD; for He is good: because His mercy endureth for ever." The Book of Psalms is part of the third section of the Hebrew Bible, and a book of the Christian Old Testament. In the slightly different numbering system used in the Greek Septuagint and Latin Vulgate translations of the Bible, this psalm is Psalm 117. In Latin, it is known as "Confitemini Domino". Its themes are thanksgiving to God and reliance on God rather than on human strength.

The psalm forms a regular part of Jewish, Catholic, Eastern Orthodox, Lutheran, Anglican and other Protestant liturgies.

== Theme and structure ==
This psalm is centered on God, in a movement that expresses gratitude, admiration, joy and praise. In the King James Version, the Lord is mentioned in almost every verse.

== Uses ==
=== New Testament ===
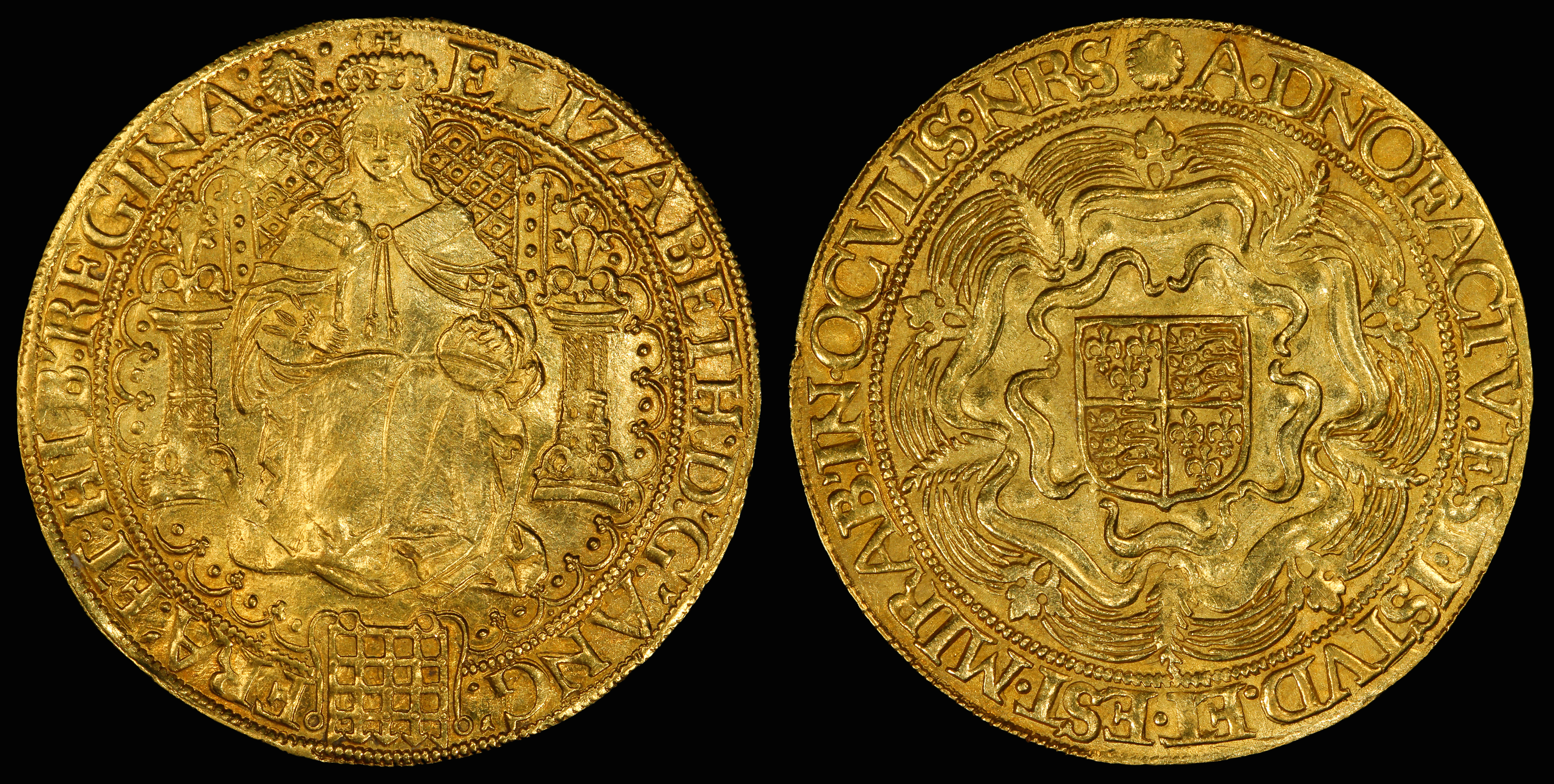
Psalm 118:23 quoted on an English Sovereign: A DNO' FACTU' EST ISTUD ET EST MIRAB' IN OCULIS NRS

Parts of this Psalm were extensively quoted by Jesus and writers of the New Testament.

- Verse 6 is quoted in Hebrews
- Verses 22-23 are quoted in Matthew. Jesus said to them (the chief priests and the elders of the people), "Have you never read in the Scriptures: "'The stone that the builders rejected has become the cornerstone; this was the Lord's doing, and it is marvelous in our eyes'?" Opposition and difficulties are seen in this Psalm but in the midst of it God will display His salvation.
- In the Gospels, Jesus is welcomed on his triumphal entry into Jerusalem by crowds quoting verses 25-26:

"Blessed is he who comes in the name of the Lord!"

=== Judaism ===
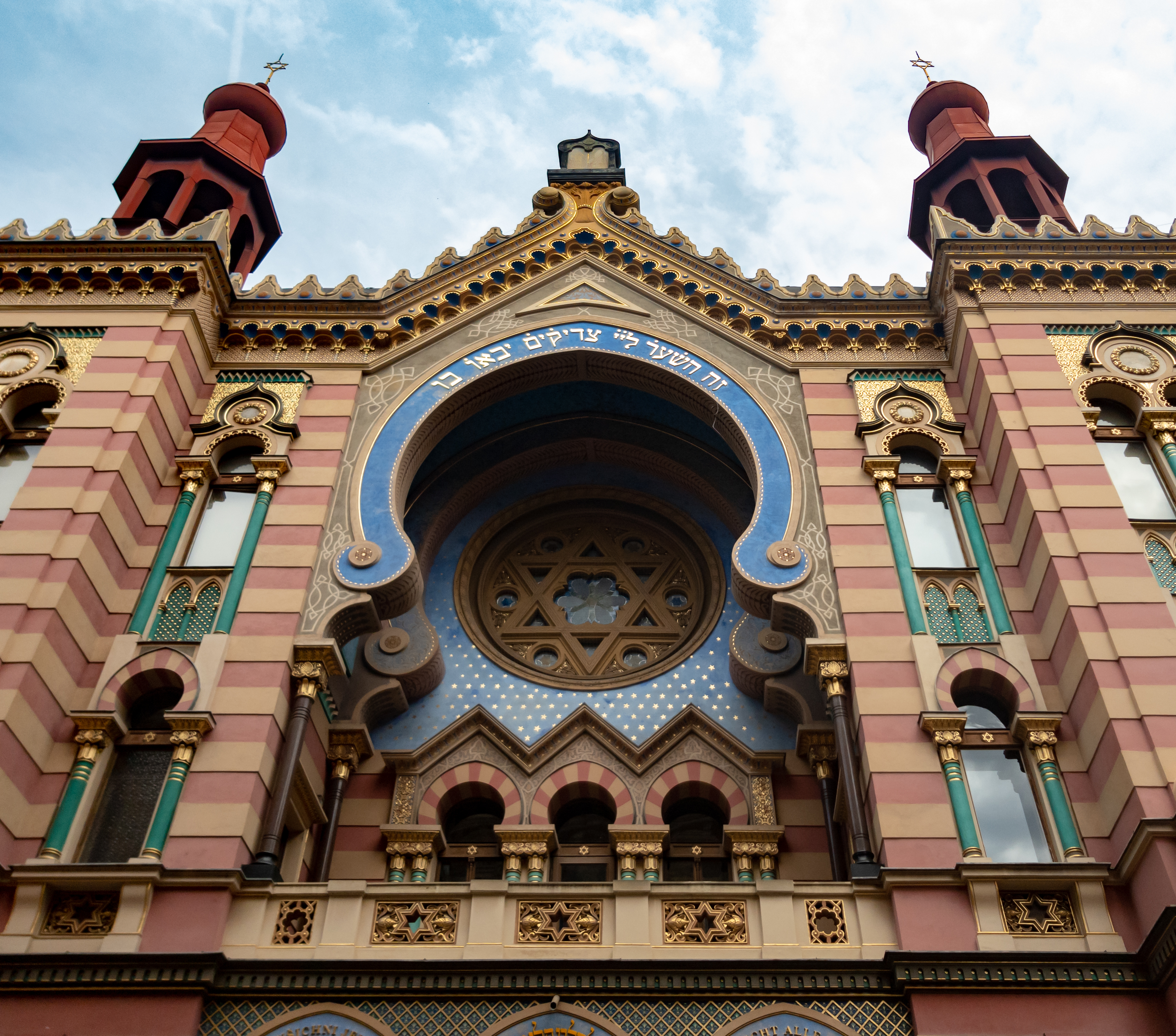
Facade of Jerusalem Synagogue with Psalm 118:20 in Hebrew, Prague, Czech Republic

Psalm 118 is the last of the so-called Egyptian Hallel. It is read on the days of recitation of the hallel.

- It is one of six psalms (113-118) of which Hallel is composed. On all days when Hallel is recited, this psalm is recited in its entirety, with the final ten verses being recited twice.
- Verse 1 is recited by some following Psalm 126 preceding Birkat Hamazon.
- Verse 5 is recited prior to the Shofar blowing on Rosh Hashanah.
- Verses 5-9 are part of Tashlikh.
- Verse 24 may be a source of the folk song Hava Nagila.
- Verse 25 is part of the long Tachanun recited on Mondays and Thursdays.
- Verse 27 is the source to the name isru chag.

=== Catholic Church ===
This text was chosen by Saint Benedict of Nursia towards 530, as the third psalm for the solemn office of Sunday Lauds (Rule of Saint Benedict, chapter XI10).

Psalm 118 (117) is now read in the Liturgy of the Hours every Sunday of the first and third weeks, at the office of Sext.

Psalm 118 is also closely associated with Eastertide, and is typically sung at the Easter Vigil and morning Mass on Easter Sunday. The gradual for Easter is based on verse 24, Haec dies quam fecit Dominus. As a result, many compositions are based on this textual fragment.

=== Anglicanism ===
An extract from verse 23 is inscribed on several English coins, with the text of the Vulgate: a Domino factum est istud hoc est mirabile in oculis nostris. Upon her accession to the throne, Elizabeth I of England is said to have pronounced this same verse, also in Latin, as quoted in the New Testament: A Domino factum est illud et est mirabile in oculis nostris.

=== Book of Common Prayer ===
In the Church of England's Book of Common Prayer, this psalm is appointed to be read on the morning of the twenty-fourth day of the month, as well as at Evensong on Easter Day.

=== Coptic Orthodox Church ===
In the Agpeya, the Coptic Church's book of hours, this psalm is prayed in the office of Vespers and the first watch of the Midnight office.

== Musical settings ==
The hymn in German "Nun saget Dank und lobt den Herren" is a paraphrase of Psalm 118. It has been set to music by various composers.

Heinrich Schütz composed a metred paraphrase of the psalm in German, "Laßt uns Gott, unserm Herren", SWV 216, for the Becker Psalter, published first in 1628.

The beginning of the psalm was set by Goran Trajkoski for a production, Eternal House, at the Macedonian National Theatre.

The 22nd line of the Psalm is referenced in the opening theme to The Boondocks by the artist Asheru where the singer proclaims "I am the stone that the builder refused" in the very first line.

The hymn, „Ihmadou al-rab (احمدوا الرب)” is written in Arabic to this psalm.

== Text ==
The following table shows the Hebrew text of the Psalm with vowels, alongside the Koine Greek text in the Septuagint and the English translation from the King James Version. Note that the meaning can slightly differ between these versions, as the Septuagint and the Masoretic Text come from different textual traditions. (Note: A 1917 translation directly from Hebrew to English by the Jewish Publication Society can be found here or here, and an 1844 translation directly from the Septuagint by L. C. L. Brenton can be found here. Both translations are in the public domain.) In the Septuagint, this psalm is numbered Psalm 117.

| # | Hebrew | English | Greek |
|---|---|---|---|
| 1 | הוֹד֣וּ לַיהֹוָ֣ה כִּי־ט֑וֹב כִּ֖י לְעוֹלָ֣ם חַסְדּֽוֹ׃ | O give thanks unto the LORD; for he is good: because his mercy endureth for ever. | ᾿Αλληλούϊα. - ΕΞΟΜΟΛΟΓΕΙΣΘΕ τῷ Κυρίῳ, ὅτι ἀγαθός, ὅτι εἰς τὸν αἰῶνα τὸ ἔλεος αὐτοῦ. |
| 2 | יֹאמַר־נָ֥א יִשְׂרָאֵ֑ל כִּ֖י לְעוֹלָ֣ם חַסְדּֽוֹ׃ | Let Israel now say, that his mercy endureth for ever. | εἰπάτω δὴ οἶκος ᾿Ισραὴλ ὅτι ἀγαθός, ὅτι εἰς τὸν αἰῶνα τὸ ἔλεος αὐτοῦ· |
| 3 | יֹאמְרוּ־נָ֥א בֵֽית־אַהֲרֹ֑ן כִּ֖י לְעוֹלָ֣ם חַסְדּֽוֹ׃ | Let the house of Aaron now say, that his mercy endureth for ever. | εἰπάτω δὴ οἶκος ᾿Ααρὼν ὅτι ἀγαθός, ὅτι εἰς τὸν αἰῶνα τὸ ἔλεος αὐτοῦ· |
| 4 | יֹאמְרוּ־נָ֭א יִרְאֵ֣י יְהֹוָ֑ה כִּ֖י לְעוֹלָ֣ם חַסְדּֽוֹ׃ | Let them now that fear the LORD say, that his mercy endureth for ever. | εἰπάτωσαν δὴ πάντες οἱ φοβούμενοι τὸν Κύριον ὅτι ἀγαθός, ὅτι εἰς τὸν αἰῶνα τὸ ἔλεος αὐτοῦ. |
| 5 | מִֽן־הַ֭מֵּצַר קָרָ֣אתִי יָּ֑הּ עָנָ֖נִי בַמֶּרְחָ֣ב יָֽהּ׃ | I called upon the LORD in distress: the LORD answered me, and set me in a large place. | ἐκ θλίψεως ἐπεκαλεσάμην τὸν Κύριον, καὶ ἐπήκουσέ μου εἰς πλατυσμόν. |
| 6 | יְהֹוָ֣ה לִ֭י לֹ֣א אִירָ֑א מַה־יַּעֲשֶׂ֖ה לִ֣י אָדָֽם׃ | The LORD is on my side; I will not fear: what can man do unto me? | Κύριος ἐμοὶ βοηθός, καὶ οὐ φοβηθήσομαι τί ποιήσει μοι ἄνθρωπος. |
| 7 | יְהֹוָ֣ה לִ֭י בְּעֹזְרָ֑י וַ֝אֲנִ֗י אֶרְאֶ֥ה בְשֹׂנְאָֽי׃ | The LORD taketh my part with them that help me: therefore shall I see my desire upon them that hate me. | Κύριος ἐμοὶ βοηθός, κἀγὼ ἐπόψομαι τοὺς ἐχθρούς μου. |
| 8 | ט֗וֹב לַחֲס֥וֹת בַּיהֹוָ֑ה מִ֝בְּטֹ֗חַ בָּאָדָֽם׃ | It is better to trust in the LORD than to put confidence in man. | ἀγαθὸν πεποιθέναι ἐπὶ Κύριον ἢ πεποιθέναι ἐπ᾿ ἄνθρωπον· |
| 9 | ט֗וֹב לַחֲס֥וֹת בַּיהֹוָ֑ה מִ֝בְּטֹ֗חַ בִּנְדִיבִֽים׃ | It is better to trust in the LORD than to put confidence in princes. | ἀγαθὸν ἐλπίζειν ἐπὶ Κύριον ἢ ἐλπίζειν ἐπ᾿ ἄρχουσι. |
| 10 | כׇּל־גּוֹיִ֥ם סְבָב֑וּנִי בְּשֵׁ֥ם יְ֝הֹוָ֗ה כִּ֣י אֲמִילַֽם׃ | All nations compassed me about: but in the name of the LORD will I destroy them. | πάντα τὰ ἔθνη ἐκύκλωσάν με, καὶ τῷ ὀνόματι Κυρίου ἠμυνάμην αὐτούς· |
| 11 | סַבּ֥וּנִי גַם־סְבָב֑וּנִי בְּשֵׁ֥ם יְ֝הֹוָ֗ה כִּ֣י אֲמִילַֽם׃ | They compassed me about; yea, they compassed me about: but in the name of the LORD I will destroy them. | κυκλώσαντες ἐκύκλωσάν με, καὶ τῷ ὀνόματι Κυρίου ἠμυνάμην αὐτούς. |
| 12 | סַבּ֤וּנִי כִדְבוֹרִ֗ים דֹּ֭עֲכוּ כְּאֵ֣שׁ קוֹצִ֑ים בְּשֵׁ֥ם יְ֝הֹוָ֗ה כִּ֣י אֲמִילַֽם׃ | They compassed me about like bees: they are quenched as the fire of thorns: for in the name of the LORD I will destroy them. | ἐκύκλωσάν με ὡσεὶ μέλισσαι κηρίον καὶ ἐξεκαύθησαν ὡς πῦρ ἐν ἀκάνθαις, καὶ τῷ ὀνόματι Κυρίου ἠμυνάμην αὐτούς. |
| 13 | דַּחֹ֣ה דְחִיתַ֣נִי לִנְפֹּ֑ל וַ֖יהֹוָ֣ה עֲזָרָֽנִי׃ | Thou hast thrust sore at me that I might fall: but the LORD helped me. | ὠσθεὶς ἀνετράπην τοῦ πεσεῖν, καὶ ὁ Κύριος ἀντελάβετό μου. |
| 14 | עׇזִּ֣י וְזִמְרָ֣ת יָ֑הּ וַֽיְהִי־לִ֝֗י לִישׁוּעָֽה׃ | The LORD is my strength and song, and is become my salvation. | ἰσχύς μου καὶ ὕμνησίς μου ὁ Κύριος καὶ ἐγένετό μοι εἰς σωτηρίαν. |
| 15 | ק֤וֹל ׀ רִנָּ֬ה וִישׁוּעָ֗ה בְּאׇהֳלֵ֥י צַדִּיקִ֑ים יְמִ֥ין יְ֝הֹוָ֗ה עֹ֣שָׂה חָֽיִל׃ | The voice of rejoicing and salvation is in the tabernacles of the righteous: the right hand of the LORD doeth valiantly. | φωνὴ ἀγαλλιάσεως καὶ σωτηρίας ἐν σκηναῖς δικαίων· δεξιὰ Κυρίου ἐποίησε δύναμιν, |
| 16 | יְמִ֣ין יְ֭הֹוָה רוֹמֵמָ֑ה יְמִ֥ין יְ֝הֹוָ֗ה עֹ֣שָׂה חָֽיִל׃ | The right hand of the LORD is exalted: the right hand of the LORD doeth valiantly. | δεξιὰ Κυρίου ὕψωσέ με, δεξιὰ Κυρίου ἐποίησε δύναμιν. |
| 17 | לֹא־אָמ֥וּת כִּֽי־אֶחְיֶ֑ה וַ֝אֲסַפֵּ֗ר מַעֲשֵׂ֥י יָֽהּ׃ | I shall not die, but live, and declare the works of the LORD. | οὐκ ἀποθανοῦμαι, ἀλλὰ ζήσομαι καὶ διηγήσομαι τὰ ἔργα Κυρίου. |
| 18 | יַסֹּ֣ר יִסְּרַ֣נִּי יָּ֑הּ וְ֝לַמָּ֗וֶת לֹ֣א נְתָנָֽנִי׃ | The LORD hath chastened me sore: but he hath not given me over unto death. | παιδεύων ἐπαίδευσέ με ὁ Κύριος καὶ τῷ θανάτῳ οὐ παρέδωκέ με. |
| 19 | פִּתְחוּ־לִ֥י שַׁעֲרֵי־צֶ֑דֶק אָבֹא־בָ֝֗ם אוֹדֶ֥ה יָֽהּ׃ | Open to me the gates of righteousness: I will go into them, and I will praise the LORD: | ἀνοίξατέ μοι πύλας δικαιοσύνης· εἰσελθὼν ἐν αὐταῖς ἐξομολογήσομαι τῷ Κυρίῳ. |
| 20 | זֶה־הַשַּׁ֥עַר לַיהֹוָ֑ה צַ֝דִּיקִ֗ים יָבֹ֥אוּ בֽוֹ׃ | This gate of the LORD, into which the righteous shall enter. | αὕτη ἡ πύλη τοῦ Κυρίου, δίκαιοι εἰσελεύσονται ἐν αὐτῇ. |
| 21 | א֭וֹדְךָ כִּ֣י עֲנִיתָ֑נִי וַתְּהִי־לִ֝֗י לִישׁוּעָֽה׃ | I will praise thee: for thou hast heard me, and art become my salvation. | ἐξομολογήσομαί σοι, ὅτι ἐπήκουσάς μου καὶ ἐγένου μοι εἰς σωτηρίαν. |
| 22 | אֶ֭בֶן מָאֲס֣וּ הַבּוֹנִ֑ים הָ֝יְתָ֗ה לְרֹ֣אשׁ פִּנָּֽה׃ | The stone which the builders refused is become the head stone of the corner. | λίθον, ὃν ἀπεδοκίμασαν οἱ οἰκοδομοῦντες, οὗτος ἐγενήθη εἰς κεφαλὴν γωνίας· |
| 23 | מֵאֵ֣ת יְ֭הֹוָה הָ֣יְתָה זֹּ֑את הִ֖יא נִפְלָ֣את בְּעֵינֵֽינוּ׃ | This is the LORD's doing; it is marvellous in our eyes. | παρὰ Κυρίου ἐγένετο αὕτη καὶ ἔστι θαυμαστὴ ἐν ὀφθαλμοῖς ἡμῶν. |
| 24 | זֶה־הַ֭יּוֹם עָשָׂ֣ה יְהֹוָ֑ה נָגִ֖ילָה וְנִשְׂמְחָ֣ה בֽוֹ׃ | This is the day which the LORD hath made; we will rejoice and be glad in it. | αὕτη ἡ ἡμέρα, ἣν ἐποίησεν ὁ Κύριος· ἀγαλλιασώμεθα καὶ εὐφρανθῶμεν ἐν αὐτῇ. |
| 25 | אָנָּ֣א יְ֭הֹוָה הוֹשִׁ֘יעָ֥ה נָּ֑א אָנָּ֥א יְ֝הֹוָ֗ה הַצְלִ֘יחָ֥ה נָּֽא׃ | Save now, I beseech thee, O LORD: O LORD, I beseech thee, send now prosperity. | ὦ Κύριε, σῶσον δή, ὦ Κύριε, εὐόδωσον δή. |
| 26 | בָּר֣וּךְ הַ֭בָּא בְּשֵׁ֣ם יְהֹוָ֑ה בֵּ֝רַ֥כְנוּכֶ֗ם מִבֵּ֥ית יְהֹוָֽה׃ | Blessed be he that cometh in the name of the LORD: we have blessed you out of the house of the LORD. | εὐλογημένος ὁ ἐρχόμενος ἐν ὀνόματι Κυρίου· εὐλογήκαμεν ὑμᾶς ἐξ οἴκου Κυρίου. |
| 27 | אֵ֤ל ׀ יְהֹוָה֮ וַיָּ֢אֶ֫ר לָ֥נוּ אִסְרוּ־חַ֥ג בַּעֲבֹתִ֑ים עַד־קַ֝רְנ֗וֹת הַמִּזְבֵּֽחַ׃ | God is the LORD, which hath shewed us light: bind the sacrifice with cords, even unto the horns of the altar. | Θεὸς Κύριος καὶ ἐπέφανεν ἡμῖν· συστήσασθε ἑορτὴν ἐν τοῖς πυκάζουσιν ἕως τῶν κεράτων τοῦ θυσιαστηρίου. |
| 28 | אֵלִ֣י אַתָּ֣ה וְאוֹדֶ֑ךָּ אֱ֝לֹהַ֗י אֲרוֹמְמֶֽךָּ׃ | Thou art my God, and I will praise thee: thou art my God, I will exalt thee. | Θεός μου εἶ σύ, καὶ ἐξομολογήσομαί σοι· Θεός μου εἶ σύ, καὶ ὑψώσω σε· ἐξομολογήσομαί σοι, ὅτι ἐπήκουσάς μου καὶ ἐγένου μοι εἰς σωτηρίαν. |
| 29 | הוֹד֣וּ לַיהֹוָ֣ה כִּי־ט֑וֹב כִּ֖י לְעוֹלָ֣ם חַסְדּֽוֹ׃ | O give thanks unto the LORD; for he is good: for his mercy endureth for ever. | ἐξομολογεῖσθε τῷ Κυρίῳ, ὅτι ἀγαθός, ὅτι εἰς τὸν αἰῶνα τὸ ἔλεος αὐτοῦ. |

=== Verse 1 ===
Oh, give thanks to the Lord, for He is good!

For His mercy endures forever.

The same words appear in verse 29, where the psalm ends. These two verses have therefore been identified as an inclusio, possibly expressing the psalmist's intention.

=== Verse 5 ===
I called on the Lord in distress;

The Lord answered me and set me in a large place.

Instead of "a large place" or "a broad place", many translations state the LORD "set me free".

=== Verse 14 ===
The Lord is my strength and song,
And He has become my salvation.

These words are paralleled in the Song of Moses and are used by the prophet Isaiah.

Most translations have translated zimrah as "song", its usual meaning. However, the Greek Septuagint translation of the parallel passage of Exodus 15:2 merely translated it as The Lord being "my protector", making no reference to song. Further, inscriptions in Ancient South Arabian, a dialect cognate of Biblical Hebrew, seem to sometimes use zimrah to mean "might" or "power", suggesting an alternative translation as "The Lord is my strength and might".

=== Verse 22 ===
The stone which the builders rejected

Has become the chief cornerstone.

=== Verse 23 ===
This was the Lord’s doing;

It is marvelous in our eyes.
