= Edmond Pidoux =

Swiss author

Edmond Pidoux (October 25, 1908 – April 17, 2004) was a Swiss author who wrote numerous poems, novels, and essays. He was particularly renowned for Biblical pieces such as L'histoire de Jonas. In 1982, he won the Prix du livre vaudois. He is a younger brother of the musicologist, Pierre Pidoux. Born in Belgium in 1908, this minister's son studied literature at the University of Lausanne in Switzerland and worked as a teacher and lecturer. He died at the age of 95 in 2004.

== Bibliography ==
- La journée de Dreuze, Lausanne, Éditions Plaisir de Lire
- Malice et Merveille, Lausanne, Éditions Plaisir de Lire
