= Louis Bourgeois (composer) =

French composer

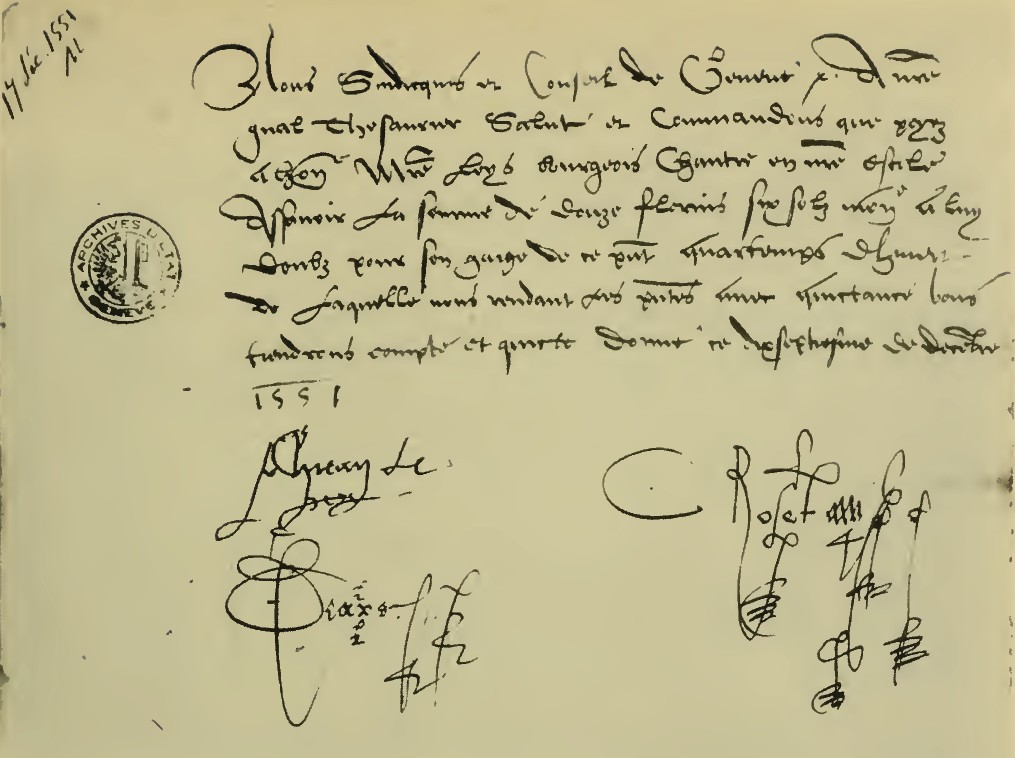
Hand and signature of Loys Bourgeois (Genève, 1551)

Loys "Louis" Bourgeois (French: [buʁʒwa]; c. 1510 – 1559) was a French composer and music theorist of the Renaissance. He is most famous as one of the main compilers of Calvinist hymn tunes in the middle of the 16th century. One of the most famous melodies in all of Christendom, the tune known as the Old 100th, to which the Protestant doxology is often sung, is commonly attributed to him.

== Life ==
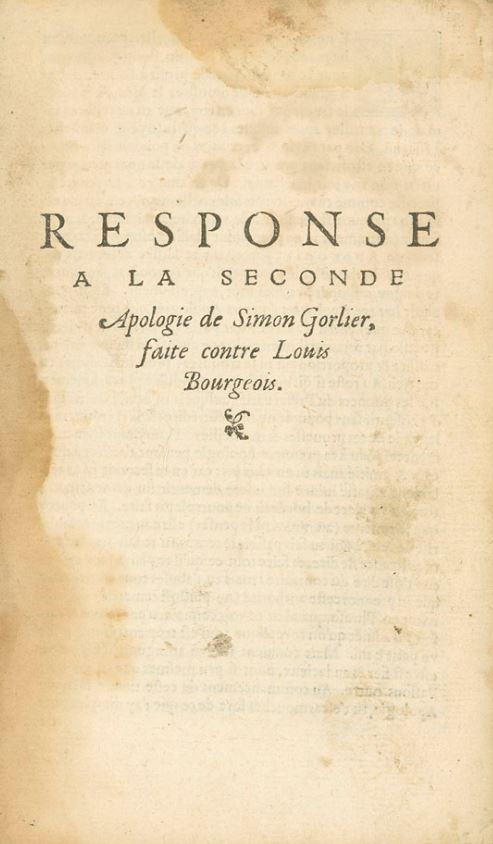
Title page of Loys Bourgeois "Response à la seconde apologie" (Lyon, 1554)

Knowledge of his early life is sparse. His first publication, some secular chansons, dates from 1539 in Lyon. By 1545 he had gone to Geneva (according to civic records) and become a music teacher there. In 1547 he was granted citizenship in Geneva, and in that same year he also published his first four-voice psalms.

In 1549 and 1550 he worked on a collections of psalm-tunes, most of which were translated by Clément Marot and Théodore de Bèze. The extent to which he was composer, arranger or compiler was not certain, until a long-lost copy of the Genevan Psalter of 1551 came to the library of the Rutgers University. In an Avertissement (note) to the reader Bourgeois specifies exactly what his predecessors had done, what he had changed and which were his own contributions. He is one of the three main composers of the hymn tunes to the Genevan Psalter.

Unfortunately, he fell foul of local musical authorities and was sent to prison on 3 December 1551 for changing the tunes for some well-known psalms "without a license." He was released on the personal intervention of John Calvin, but the controversy continued: those who had already learned the tunes had no desire to learn new versions, and the town council ordered the burning of Bourgeois's instructions to the singers, claiming they were confusing. Shortly after this incident, Bourgeois left Geneva never to return: he settled in Lyon, his Geneva employment was terminated, and his wife tardily followed him to Lyon.

While in Lyon, Bourgeois wrote a fierce piece of invective against the publishers of Geneva. His daughter was baptized in Paris in May 1560 (as a Catholic), and also in 1560 a Parisian publisher posthumously printed a volume of his secular chansons – a form he had condemned as "dissolute" during his Geneva years.

== Music and influence ==
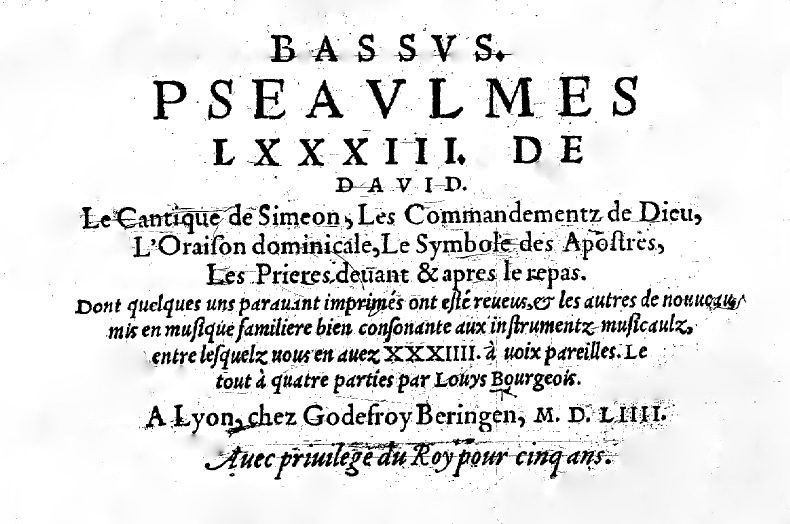
Title page of Loys Bourgeois "Pseaulmes LXXXII" (Lyon : 1554)

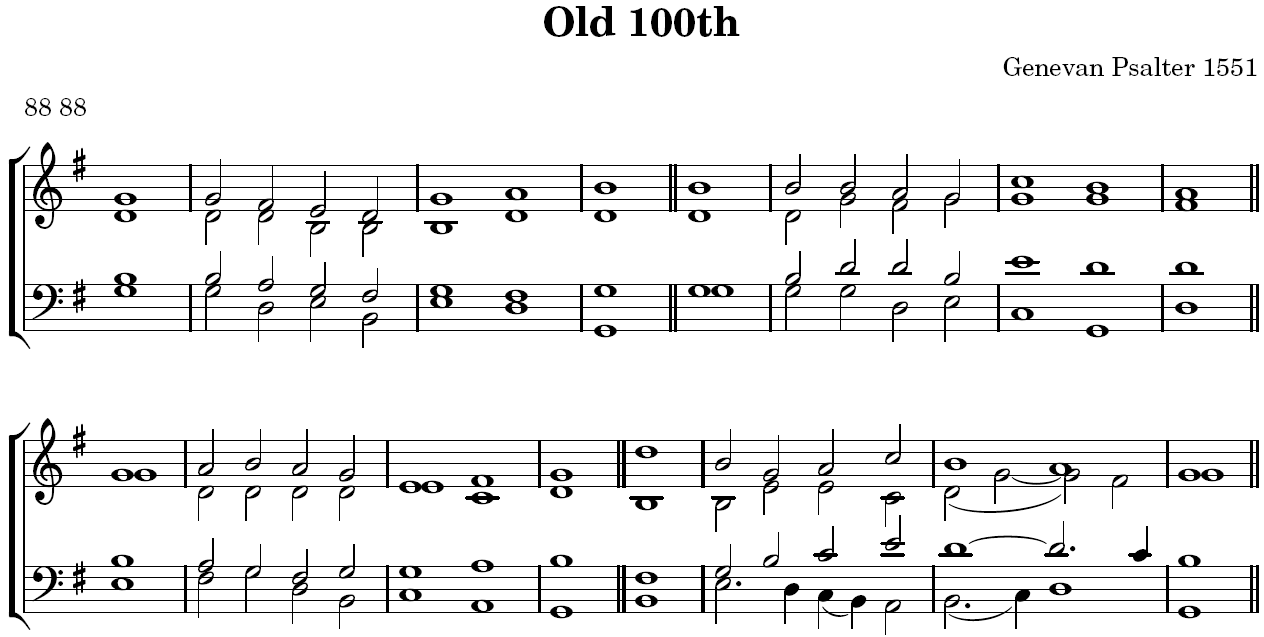
Old 100th

Louis Bourgeois is the one most responsible for the tunes in the Genevan Psalter, the source for the metrical psalmody of both the Reformed Church in England and the Pilgrims in America. In the original versions by Bourgeois, the music is monophonic, in accordance with the dictates of John Calvin, who disapproved not only of counterpoint but of any multiple parts; Bourgeois though did also provide four-part harmonizations, but they were reserved for singing and playing at home. Many of the four-part settings are syllabic and chordal, a style which has survived in many Protestant church services to the present day.

Of the tunes in the Genevan Psalter, some are reminiscent of secular chansons, others are directly borrowed from the Strasbourg Psalter; The remainder were composed by successively Guillaume Franc, Louis Bourgeois and Pierre Davantès. By far the most famous of Bourgeois' compositions is the tune known as the Old 100th.

Melodies by Bourgeois were used for modern hymn, such as "Du, Gott, liebst uns von Ewigkeit", a 1974 penitential song in German that is part of several regional editions of the Catholic hymnal Gotteslob, such as the Diocese of Mainz.

== References and further reading ==
- Frank Dobbins, "Loys Bourgeois", in The New Grove Dictionary of Music and Musicians, ed. Stanley Sadie. 20 vol. London, Macmillan Publishers Ltd., 1980. ISBN 1-56159-174-2
- Gustave Reese, Music in the Renaissance. New York, W.W. Norton & Co., 1954. ISBN 0-393-09530-4
- Frank Dobbins, "Loys Bourgeois", Grove Music Online ed. L. Macy (Accessed March 29, 2005), (subscription access)
- Harold Gleason and Warren Becker, Music in the Middle Ages and Renaissance (Music Literature Outlines Series I). Bloomington, Indiana. Frangipani Press, 1986. ISBN 0-89917-034-X
- Pseaumes Octantetrois de David, mis en rime Françoise par Clément Marot et Théodore de Bèze, imprimé par Jean Crespin à Genève 1551, Reproduced from the Rutgers University copy, 1973 X BS 1443.FSM332
- Pierre Pidoux, Le Psautier Huguenot, VOL I/II
