= Pierre Pidoux =

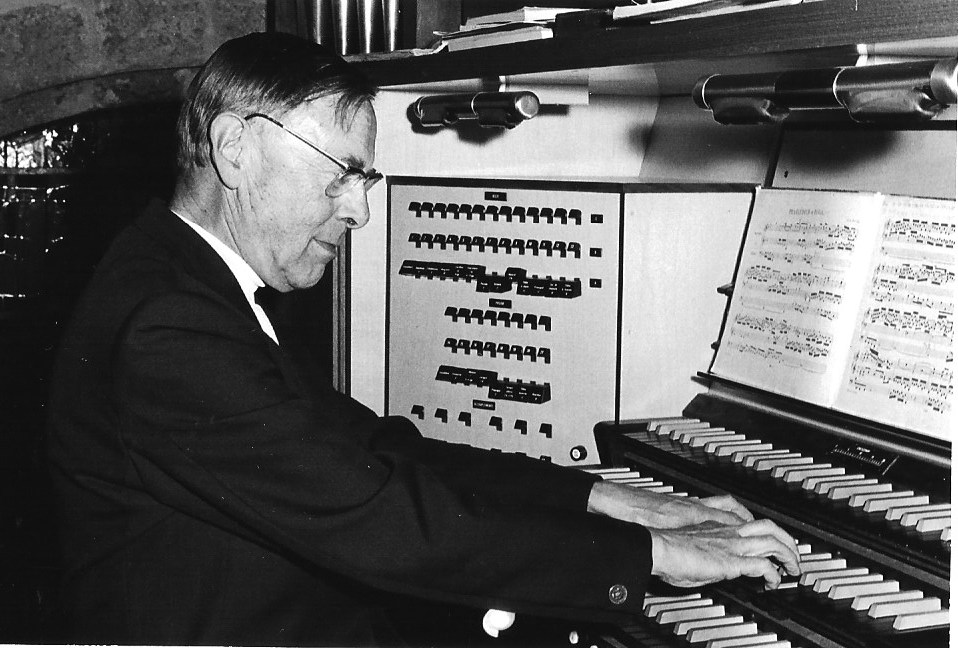
Pierre Pidoux

Pierre Pidoux (4 March 1905 in Neuchatel – 16 July 2001 in Geneva), was a Swiss theologian, organist and musicologist, brother of Edmond Pidoux.

== Life ==
Pierre's father was a Protestant Swiss minister, who worked in Belgium (in the Borinage. Because of the 'Great War' Pierre was sent back to Switzerland and grew up in Neûchatel. He graduated in theology in 1933 (Lausanne) and became a minister of the Eglise Libre in Winterthur. After a visit to Glasgow, he began to study the organ at the Conservatory in Geneva from 1933 to 1936. He founded and directed the Choeur J.S. Bach in Lausanne until 1948, holding at the same time an organ post in Lausanne. In 1948 he was appointed organist at the Protestant Church of Montreux, where he lived together with his wife, Gertrude Junod-Burger. From 1946 to 1965 he was in charge of the hymnology course at the theology faculty of the Eglise Libre in Lausanne; in 1964 he was given the honorary doctorate in theology by the university.

== Work ==
Pidoux’s activities have been devoted mostly to hymnology, musicology and teaching. Though he has edited many volumes of other early music (e.g. Andrea Gabrieli and Girolamo Frescobaldi), he is generally known as a specialist in the history of the Huguenot psalter. His magnum opus is the two-volume edition of text and melodies of this Psalter: Le psautier huguenot du XVIe siècle, i: Les mélodies; ii: Documents et bibliographie (Basle, 1962). He promoted the music of the Protestant church (organ, choir and community hymnsinging). He was an editor of the series Collection de Musique Protestante (from 1935) and of the sacred music series Cantate Domino. He contributed music, harmonisations and texts to the new hymnal of the French-speaking Reformed Church of Switzerland (1976). In this hymnal also many texts of his brother, Edmond Pidoux, literature professor in Lausanne, are present. In 1967 he co-edited the complete works of Claude Goudimel. He composed many works for mixed choir and organ.

== See also ==
- Hymnology
- Church music
- Protestant music
- Reformed Church
- Claude Goudimel
- Andrea Gabrieli
- Girolamo Frescobaldi
- Edmond Pidoux

== Sources ==
- "Pidoux, Pierre", in Grove's Dictionary (E. Darbellay/ D. Baumann).
- Mélanges d’histoire et de bibliographie offerts à Pierre Pidoux: à l’occasion de son nonantième anniversaire, 4 mars 1995, ed. A. Gaucher (Pessac, 1995) - special edition of bulletin "Psaume".
- J.M. Noailly, 'Survol biographique', in Une centaine de paraphrases poétiques du Psaume 16, Conserva me Domine, pour le centenaire de la naissance de Pierre Pidoux, - bulletin "Psaume" - 16 (2005), pp. 5–10.
