= Genevan Psalter =

French choral book

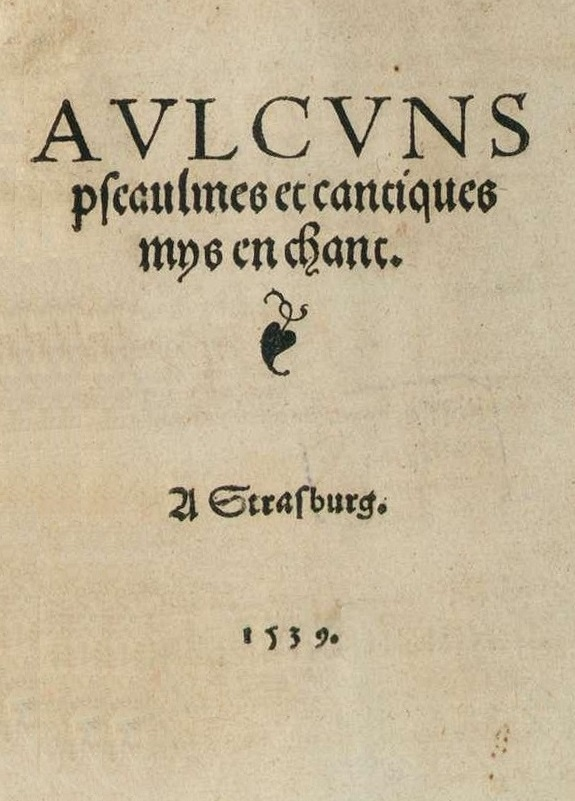
First edition title page of the 1539 Strasburg Psalter

The Genevan Psalter, also known as the Huguenot Psalter, is a 1539 metrical psalter in French created under the supervision of John Calvin for liturgical use by the Reformed churches of the city of Geneva in the sixteenth century.

== Background ==
Before the Protestant Reformation, a select group of performers generally sang the psalms during church services, not the entire congregation. John Calvin believed that the entire congregation should participate in praising God in the worship service, and already in his Institutes of the Christian Religion of 1536 he speaks of the importance of singing psalms. In the articles for the organization of the church and its worship in Geneva, dated January 16, 1537, Calvin writes: "it is a thing most expedient for the edification of the church to sing some psalms in the form of public prayers by which one prays to God or sings His praises so that the hearts of all may be roused and stimulated to make similar prayers and to render similar praises and thanks to God with a common love." For this reason he wanted to create a songbook of hymns based on the psalms in the belief that in this form these biblical texts would become more easily accessible to people.

After being forced to leave Geneva in 1538, Calvin settled in Strasbourg, where he joined the Huguenot congregation and also led numerous worship services. It was in Strasbourg that he became familiar with the German versification of the psalms prepared by Martin Luther and others. Calvin shared these songs with his French congregation and also wrote some metrical versifications for them himself. Considering his own versions of the psalms not to be of sufficient quality, he turned to the French court poet Clément Marot, who had already versified most of the psalms in French during the first part of the sixteenth century.

== Editions ==
=== 1539 edition ===
In 1539 the first edition of Calvin's psalter was published. It bore the title "Aulcuns Pseaulmes et cantiques mys en chant" (Some rhymed Psalms and Hymns to be sung) and contained 18 psalms and hymns set to music, including 12 versifications of Marot (1, 2, 3, 15, 32, 51, 103, 114, 115, 130, 137, 143), six psalms of Calvin (25, 36, 46, 91, 113, 138), the ten commandments, the Song of Simeon and the Apostles' Creed. Most of the melodies therein were familiar tunes used in the German church in Strasbourg at that time. Some were apparently composed by Wolfgang Dachstein or Matthias Greiter.

=== 1542 edition ===
In 1541 Calvin returned to Geneva, where he published a new psalter in 1542. Guillaume Franc, cantor and music teacher there, contributed numerous tunes for this edition including those for Psalms 6, 8, 19, 22, 24 (this tune was also used for Psalms 62, 95 and 111), and 38. The collection was titled "Les Pseaumes mis en rime francoise par Clément Marot et Théodore de Béze".

=== 1543 edition ===
Clément Marot moved to Geneva in 1543, where he created rhymed versions of another 19 psalms and the Song of Simeon. Although Calvin wanted him to complete the job, he left the city and went to Turin, where he died in the fall of 1544. His work was continued by Théodore de Bèze. The 1543 edition bore the title La Forme des Prieres et Chantz ecclesiastiques. There was an argument with the City Council concerning its publication because of the presence in it of a rhymed version of the Angelical salutation. The melodies for the new psalms were composed by Guillaume Franc.

=== 1551 edition ===
Containing 83 psalms, this psalter appeared under the title Pseaumes Octante Trois de David (Eighty-three Psalms of David). In addition to the 49 psalms translated by Marot, this edition features 34 psalms with the text translated by de Bèze. The new collection was published in Geneva by Jean Crispin in the fall of 1551. The supervising composer was Loys Bourgeois. It is not exactly clear how many of the melodies he actually composed, but it is generally assumed that most of the new additions were from his hand. This includes the first version of the hymn tune known as the "Old 100th", nowadays common as a setting for Psalm 100 ("All people that on earth do dwell") – in this edition, however, this tune is associated with Psalm 134 (Ecce nunc benedicite Dominum).

=== 1562 edition ===
Finally in 1562 a complete psalter was issued with rhymed versions of all 150 psalms. Some of the earlier melodies were replaced. The last 40 melodies are ascribed to a certain Maistre Pierre, probably Pierre Davantès. Many of the lyrics were updated or replaced and all of them were written by Marot and de Bèze.

=== Editions since 1587 ===
In 1587, a light revision of the psalter was led by de Bèze and Corneille Bonaventure Bertram. The next editions of the Genevan Psalter followed this revised version, which was considered as official.

== Worldwide use ==
The Genevan melodies are still widely used in churches all over the world. In particular, the melody attributed to Louis Bourgeois known as The Old 100th or "Doxology" is found in numerous hymnals across the world. Most of the other melodies from the Genevan Psalter are still used in Reformed churches in the Netherlands, Belgium, Germany, Hungary, Scotland, Canada, the United States, South Africa and Australia.

The Reformed Churches of Brazil are also currently working on a translation of the psalms to be sung to the Genevan tunes.

In The Netherlands, Jan Utenhove and Lukas d'Heere had translated psalms using the Genevan melodies. In 1566 Petrus Dathenus published a complete Dutch translation of the psalter using the melodies of the Genevan Psalter. Eventually this psalter became the official hymnbook in all the Reformed churches in the country. Without the support of a choir or pipe organ (both forbidden) the precentor had to teach and intonate the melodies. The quality of congregational hymn singing soon began to deteriorate, and the Renaissance melodies were sung with 'whole notes' only, removing the original rhythm from the music. This practice gradually disappeared as pipe organs and choirs became more prevalent, with the exception of more orthodox churches still employing the whole-note tradition. In 1773 a new translation was introduced, and again in 1967. A rich musical culture has flourished around the Genevan Psalter in the Netherlands, especially in the 19th and 20th centuries, with famous Dutch organists such as Jan Zwart, Feike Asma and Willem Hendrik Zwart publishing their own musical renditions of the melodies as well as frequently employing the melodies in organ improvisation.

Many of the Reformed churches in North America were founded by the Dutch, who brought these Genevan melodies with them when they emigrated. Probably the only Christians in North America who still use the Genevan Psalter in its entirety are the Canadian Reformed Churches. They sing from their own Book of Praise, the Anglo-Genevan Psalter, containing English versifications for all the Genevan tunes. Dutch settlers in South Africa also founded Reformed churches where many of the Genevan melodies are still used today, especially with the Afrikaans versifications of the 20th-century poet Totius.

A complete collection of the Genevan psalm melodies can be found in the German hymnals of the Evangelisch Reformierte Kirche, and some of them are also found in the hymnals of other Protestant churches in Germany. They are even to be found in the Roman Catholic hymnbook in use in Germany.

== Historical significance ==
The Genevan Psalter is predominantly used within the Calvinist churches. One result is that most of the singing in Calvinist churches is done in unison. Harmonies and instrumental renditions were exclusively used within the home or for concert performances. Hence the number of musical arrangements based on the Genevan Psalm melodies is far smaller than those based on the church music of other traditions. The most well known harmonies based on the Genevan Psalter are the four-part choral renditions composed by Claude Goudimel. Less known are the compositions of Claude Le Jeune from the same era and the arrangements of Clément Janequin and Paschal de l'Estocart. The Dutch composer Jan Pieterszoon Sweelinck wrote motets for four to eight voices for all the psalms, some of them through-composed including all verses, as well as a number of psalm variations for organ. Anthonie van Noordt, another Dutch composer, wrote organ works in a similar style based on these melodies. Orlando di Lasso together with his son Rodolpho composed three-part renditions of the psalms by Caspar Ulenberg, whose melodies were mostly based on the Genevan melodies. In North-Germany, Sweelinck's pupil Paul Siefert composed two volumes of psalm motets.

The Polish composer Wojciech Bobowski, who later converted to Islam and took the name Ali Ufki, modified the first fourteen psalms to the Turkish tuning system, writing Turkish texts to fit the Genevan tunes. In Italy the Jewish composer Salamone Rossi wrote motets based on the Genevan melodies.

Several psalms from the Genevan Psalter were translated to German, retaining the melodies, such as "Mein ganzes Herz erhebet dich", a paraphrase of Psalm 138 which was modified several times and became part of Lutheran, Protestant and Catholic hymnals. Thus a number of these melodies entered compositions of Johann Sebastian Bach and others. More recent composers inspired by the Genevan Psalter are Zoltán Kodály, Frank Martin and Arthur Honegger, amongst others.

Not quite a dozen years after the publication of the Genevan Psalter in 1573, the Lobwasser Psalter was published by legal scholar Ambrosius Lobwasser and found its way into the public worship of the Reformed Churches in, e.g., Zürich. The Lobwasser Psalter in turn served as the model for Czech and Hungarian versifications of the Genevan psalms.

A Czech-language edition of the Genevan Psalms was prepared by Jiří Strejc (also known as Georg Vetter, 1536–1599), who was born in the Moravian village of Zábřeh and became a minister in the Unity of the Brethren, the ecclesiastical heirs of the ill-fated pre-reformer Jan Hus (c. 1369–1415). It was still being used as recently as the turn of the last century.

In Hungary Albert Szenczi Molnár versified the psalms in the Hungarian language, and they are still sung today in the Reformed Church congregations in the Lands of the Crown of St. Stephen, including Hungary and parts of Romania and Ukraine.

The Reformed Church in Japan has completed a translation of all 150 psalms to be sung to the Genevan tunes, and this Japanese Genevan Psalmody has been recorded by members of the Bach Collegium Japan conducted by Masaaki Suzuki.

== Tunes ==
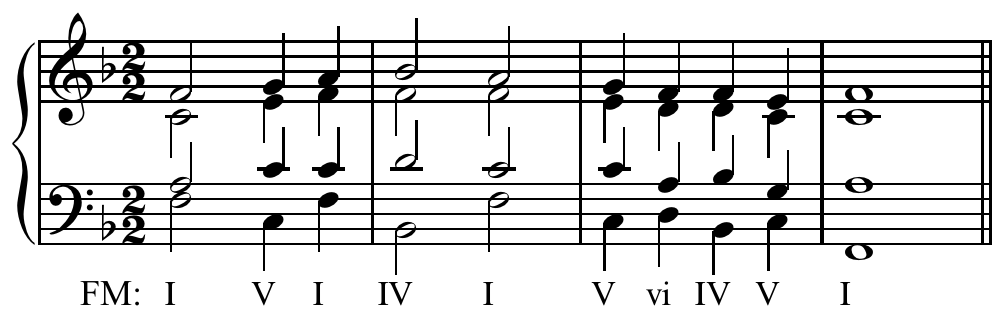
Homorhythmic (i.e., hymn-style) arrangement of the tune "Old 124th", from the Genevan Psalter.

In the complete edition of 1562, 124 tunes were used for the 150 psalms. Of the tunes which are used repeatedly, 15 occur twice, four occur three times and one occurs four times, in the following combinations:

- psalm 5 and 64
- psalm 14 and 53
- psalm 17, 63 and 70
- psalm 18 and 144
- psalm 24, 62, 95 and 111
- psalm 28 and 109
- psalm 30, 76 and 139
- psalm 31 and 71
- psalm 33 and 67
- psalm 36 and 68
- psalm 46 and 82
- psalm 51 and 69
- psalm 60 and 108
- psalm 65 and 72
- psalm 66, 98 and 118
- psalm 74 and 116
- psalm 77 and 86
- psalm 78 and 90
- psalm 100, 131 and 142
- psalm 117 and 127

== Musical characteristics ==
The Genevan melodies form a strikingly homogeneous collection. Besides the fact that the melodies were written over a relatively short time span by a small number of composers, they have a number of other characteristics in common. They are based on the so-called church modes; the melodic range is generally within one octave; the note values are restricted to whole notes (also known as minim) and half notes (also known as semibreve) with the exception of the final note; every melody starts with a whole note and ends on a quadruple whole note (also known as longa). Regular meter and bar-lines are absent; and there are very few melismas (only Psalm 2, 6, 10, 13, 91, 138)

== Editions ==
- Book of Praise, Anglo-Genevan Psalter, ISBN 0-88756-029-6
- Pierre Pidoux, Le Psautier Huguenot, VOL I
- Pierre Pidoux, Le Psautier Huguenot, VOL II

== See also ==
- Metrical psalter

Anabaptist

- Ausbund

Anglican

- Book of Common Prayer
- Whole Book of Psalms

Lutheran

- First Lutheran hymnal
- Erfurt Enchiridion
- Eyn geystlich Gesangk Buchleyn
- Swenske songer eller wisor 1536
- Thomissøn's hymnal

Presbyterian

- Book of Common Order
- Scottish Psalter

Reformed

- Souterliedekens
